= Williams FW33 =

Formula One Car for 2011 season

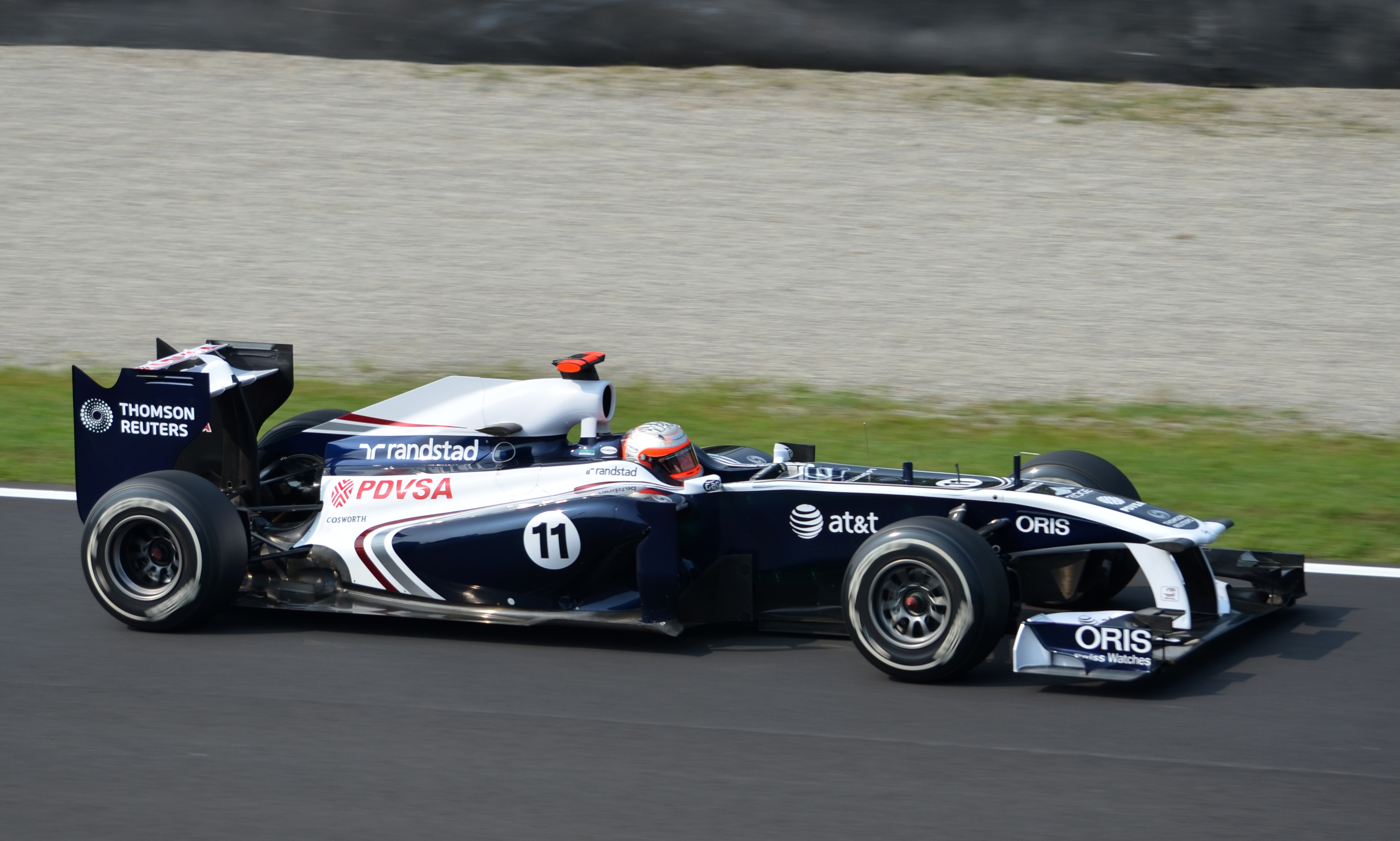
- Rubens Barrichello driving the FW33 at the Italian Grand Prix
- Category: Formula One
- Constructor: Williams
- Designers: Sam Michael (Technical Director); Ed Wood (Chief Designer); Clive Cooper (Head of Design - Composites and Structures); Christopher Brawn (Head of Design - Suspension, Steering, Breaks); Mark Loasby (Head of Design - Systems); Jon Tomlinson (Head of Aerodynamics)
- Predecessor: Williams FW32
- Successor: Williams FW34

Technical specifications
- Chassis: Carbon-fibre and honeycomb composite monocoque
- Suspension (front): Carbon-fibre double wishbone arrangement, with composite toelink and pushrod-activated springs and anti-roll bar
- Suspension (rear): As front, except pullrod activated rear dampers
- Engine: Cosworth CA2011k 2.4 L (146 cu in) 90° V8, limited to 18,000 RPM with KERS naturally aspirated mid-mounted
- Transmission: Seven-speed sequential semi-automatic gearbox with reverse gear electro-hydraulically actuated seamless-shift
- Weight: 640 kg (1,411 lb) (including driver)
- Fuel: BP
- Tyres: Pirelli P Zero; Rays Wheels (front and rear): 13"

Competition history
- Notable entrants: AT&T Williams
- Notable drivers: 11. (Brazil) Rubens Barrichello; 12. (Venezuela) Pastor Maldonado
- Debut: 2011 Australian Grand Prix
- Last event: 2011 Brazilian Grand Prix
Races	Wins	Podiums	Poles	F/Laps
19	0	0	0	0

The Williams FW33 was a Formula One racing car developed by Williams F1 for the 2011 Formula One season. It was driven by Brazilian veteran Rubens Barrichello and 2010 GP2 Series champion and rookie driver Pastor Maldonado. The car was shaken down at Silverstone on 28 January 2011, and made its full on-track debut at the Circuit Ricardo Tormo in Valencia, Spain, on 1 February 2011 in an interim testing livery. The definitive livery was released on 24 February, adding white, silver and red to the existing dark blue in a design directly inspired by the Rothmans livery used from 1994 to 1997.

== Season review ==
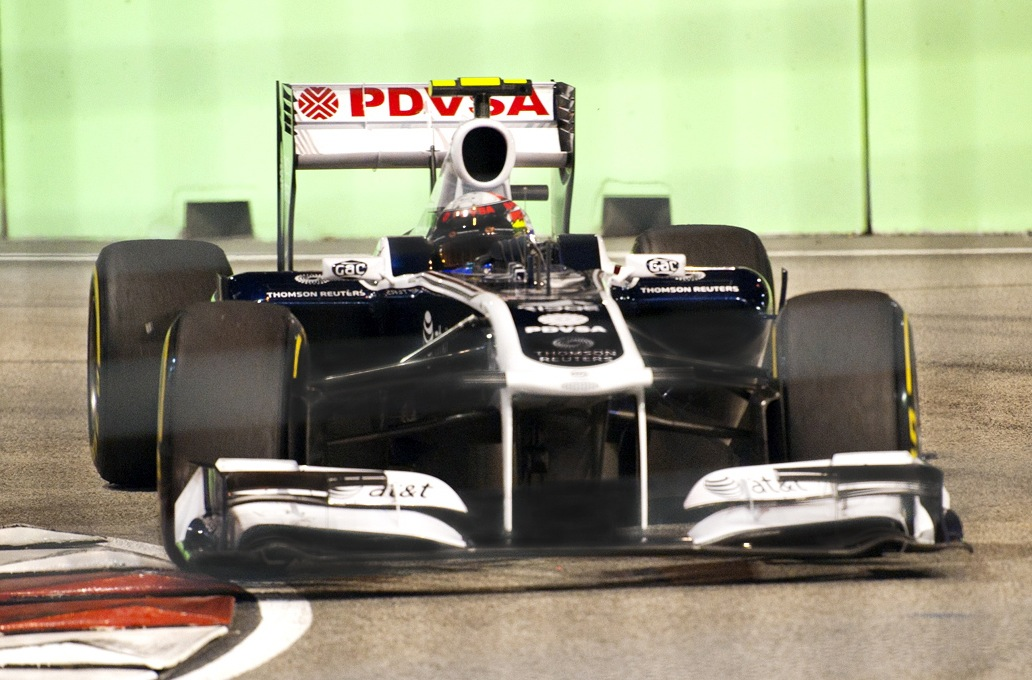
Maldonado during the Singapore Grand Prix, where he finished 11th.

During the course of the season, it became clear that the car was much less competitive than the Williams FW32 as the car tended to lack pace and struggled in races. Both drivers retired from the first two races of the season. In the next three races, both drivers finished, but failed to score any points. This made it the worst start to a season in the history of the Williams team. Monaco saw an improvement in the team's fortunes as Barrichello finished 9th. It could have been a double points finish for the team, but Maldonado retired after a collision with Lewis Hamilton, but was classified in 18th place after finishing more than 90% of the race. The same result also occurred in the chaotic 2011 Canadian Grand Prix where Barrichello finished 9th and Maldonado again retired after he spun off during the race. No more points were to come for the team until Spa, where Maldonado scored his first point with tenth place. This turned out to be the FW33's final point in F1; the team eventually finished the year ninth in the World Constructors' Championship standings, with five points, the team's lowest finish since its inaugural season in 1978.

== Livery ==
The car ran with white sidepods with an image of an origami bird in response to the Tōhoku earthquake and tsunami.

== Complete Formula One results ==
(key) (results in bold indicate pole position; results in italics indicate fastest lap)

Year	Entrant	Engine	Tyres	Drivers	1	2	3	4	5	6	7	8	9	10	11	12	13	14	15	16	17	18	19	Points	WCC
2011	AT&T Williams	Cosworth CA2011K V8	**P**		AUS	MAL	CHN	TUR	ESP	MON	CAN	EUR	GBR	GER	HUN	BEL	ITA	SIN	JPN	KOR	IND	ABU	BRA	**5**	**9th**
2011	AT&T Williams	Cosworth CA2011K V8	**P**	Barrichello	Ret	Ret	13	15	17	9	9	12	13	Ret	13	16	12	13	17	12	15	12	14	**5**	**9th**
2011	AT&T Williams	Cosworth CA2011K V8	**P**	Maldonado	Ret	Ret	18	17	15	18^{†}	Ret	18	14	14	16	10	11	11	14	Ret	Ret	14	Ret	**5**	**9th**

^{†} Driver failed to finish the race, but was classified as they had completed >90% of the race distance.
