= 2018 BOSS GP Series =

The 2018 BOSS GP season was the 24th season of the BOSS GP series. The championship began on 22 April at Hockenheim and finished on 14 October at Paul Ricard.

== Teams and Drivers ==
Team	Chassis	Engine	No.	Driver	Rounds
Open Class
Top Speed	Toro Rosso STR1	Cosworth TJ2005 3.0 L V10	1	(Austria) Ingo Gerstl	All
Top Speed	Toro Rosso STR1	Cosworth TJ2005 3.0 L V10	2	(Germany) Markus Lehmann	7
Penn Elcom Racing	Benetton B197	Judd GV 4.0 L V10	7	(United States) Phil Stratford	All
Mansell Motorsport	Dallara GP2/08 Evo	Judd GV 4.0 L V10	11	(Netherlands) Rinus van Kalmthout	3
H&A Racing	Arrows A22	Asiatech 001 3.0 L V10	21	(Austria) Bernd Herndlhofer	1
Speed Center	Forti FG03	Judd DB 4.0 L V10	22	(Germany) Hans Laub	3–4, 7
F Xtreme Racing Team	Super Aguri SA06	Cosworth TJ2005 3.0 L V10	26	(Germany) Wolfgang Jaksch	1, 3–6
Formula Class
Top Speed	Dallara GP2/08	Mecachrome V8108 4.0 L V8	100	(Austria) Thomas Jakoubek	1–4, 6–7
Top Speed	Dallara GP2/08	Mecachrome V8108 4.0 L V8	121	(Austria) Reinhard Kofler	2
Top Speed	Dallara GP2/08	Mecachrome V8108 4.0 L V8	181	(Austria) Manfred Loach	1
Top Speed	Dallara GP2/08	Mecachrome V8108 4.0 L V8	221	(Austria) Bernd Herndlhofer	4, 6
Top Speed	Dallara GP2/08	Mecachrome V8108 4.0 L V8	888	(Germany) Florian Schnitzenbaumer	All
Top Speed	Dallara GP2/05	Mecachrome V8108 4.0 L V8	110	(Austria) Bianca Steiner	1–2, 4
Speed Center	Dallara GP2/08	Mecachrome V8108 4.0 L V8	101	(Switzerland) Peter Göllner	1–2, 4–7
Speed Center	Dallara GP2/08	Mecachrome V8108 4.0 L V8	515	(Switzerland) Alain Valente	2, 7
Speed Center	Dallara GP2/08	Mecachrome V8108 4.0 L V8	555	(Switzerland) Christian Eicke	All
Speed Center	Dallara GP2/08	Mecachrome V8108 4.0 L V8	565	(Germany) Hans Laub	2
Speed Center	Dallara GP2/08	Mecachrome V8108 4.0 L V8	666	(Switzerland) Roy Glaser	4–5
Speed Center	Dallara T08	Renault V4Y 3.5 L V6	212	(United Kingdom) John Reaks	1
H&A Racing	Dallara GP2/05	Mecachrome V8108 4.0 L V8	105	(Germany) Wolfgang Jordan	3–4
H&A Racing	Dallara GP2/05	Mecachrome V8108 4.0 L V8	222	(Czech Republic) Veronika Cicha	1, 3–6
Ray-Ban	Dallara T08	Renault V4Y 3.5 L V6	111	(France) 'Piter'	1, 3–4
ZIG-ZAG Motorsport Service	Lola B05/52	Zytek KV 3.0 L V8	116	(Monaco) Nicolas Matile	6
ZIG-ZAG Motorsport Service	Dallara GP2/08	Mecachrome V8108 4.0 L V8	129	(Monaco) Marc Faggionato	6
Team Griffith's	Dallara GP2/05	Mecachrome V8108 4.0 L V8	150	(France) David Moretti	3
MRC Sport	Dallara GP2/11	Mecachrome V8108 4.0 L V8	217	(Italy) Marco Ghiotto	3, 7
Fiedler Racing	Dallara GP2/05	Mecachrome V8108 4.0 L V8	321	(Germany) Andreas Fiedler	1–3, 5–7
MM International Motorsport	Dallara GP2/11	Mecachrome V8108 4.0 L V8	323	(Italy) Armando Mangini	1–4, 6–7
MM International Motorsport	Dallara GP2/05	Mecachrome V8108 4.0 L V8	122	(Italy) Sergio Ghiotto	7
MM International Motorsport	Dallara GP2/05	Mecachrome V8108 4.0 L V8	324	(Italy) Gianluca Ripoli	4, 7
MM International Motorsport	Dallara GP2/05	Mecachrome V8108 4.0 L V8	999	(Italy) Salvatore de Plano	1, 6–7
Becker Motorsport	Dallara SN01	AER P57 3.4 L V6	411	(Germany) Karl-Heinz Becker	1–4
Kindler Motorsport	Dallara SN01	AER P57 3.4 L V6	430	(Switzerland) Martin Kindler	1
Team Ledermair Motorsport	Dallara GP2/08	Mecachrome V8108 4.0 L V8	444	(Austria) Johann Ledermair	2, 4
Inter Europol Competition	Dallara GP2/05	Mecachrome V8108 4.0 L V8	505	(Germany) Walter Steding	All

== Calendar ==
Round		Circuit	Date	Pole position	Fastest lap	Winning driver	Winning team	Formula Class Winner
1	R1	(Germany) Hockenheimring, Hockenheim	21 April	(Austria) Ingo Gerstl	(Austria) Ingo Gerstl	(Austria) Ingo Gerstl	(Austria) Top Speed	(Germany) Florian Schnitzenbaumer
1	R2	(Germany) Hockenheimring, Hockenheim	22 April		(Austria) Ingo Gerstl	(Austria) Ingo Gerstl	(Austria) Top Speed	(Germany) Florian Schnitzenbaumer
2	R3	(Austria) Red Bull Ring, Spielberg	19 May	(Austria) Ingo Gerstl	(Austria) Ingo Gerstl	(Austria) Ingo Gerstl	(Austria) Top Speed	(Austria) Johann Ledermair
2	R4	(Austria) Red Bull Ring, Spielberg	20 May		(Austria) Ingo Gerstl	(Austria) Ingo Gerstl	(Austria) Top Speed	(Austria) Johann Ledermair
3	R5	(Italy) Autodromo Nazionale Monza, Monza	30 June	(Austria) Ingo Gerstl	(Austria) Ingo Gerstl	(Austria) Ingo Gerstl	(Austria) Top Speed	(Italy) Marco Ghiotto
3	R6	(Italy) Autodromo Nazionale Monza, Monza	1 July		(Austria) Ingo Gerstl	(Germany) Wolfgang Jaksch	(Germany) F Xtreme Racing Team	(Italy) Armando Mangini
4	R7	(Germany) Hockenheimring, Hockenheim	21 July	(Austria) Ingo Gerstl	(Austria) Ingo Gerstl	(Austria) Ingo Gerstl	(Austria) Top Speed	(Switzerland) Roy Glaser
4	R8	(Germany) Hockenheimring, Hockenheim	22 July	Race Cancelled				
5	R9	(Netherlands) TT Circuit Assen, Assen	18 August	(Austria) Ingo Gerstl	(Austria) Ingo Gerstl	(Austria) Ingo Gerstl	(Austria) Top Speed	(Germany) Andreas Fiedler
5	R10	(Netherlands) TT Circuit Assen, Assen	19 August		(Austria) Ingo Gerstl	(Austria) Ingo Gerstl	(Austria) Top Speed	(Switzerland) Roy Glaser
6	R11	(Czech Republic) Masaryk Circuit, Brno	8 September	(Austria) Ingo Gerstl	(Austria) Ingo Gerstl	(Austria) Ingo Gerstl	(Austria) Top Speed	(Monaco) Marc Faggionato
6	R12	(Czech Republic) Masaryk Circuit, Brno	9 September		(Austria) Ingo Gerstl	(Austria) Ingo Gerstl	(Austria) Top Speed	(Monaco) Marc Faggionato
7	R13	(Austria) Red Bull Ring, Spielberg	22 September	(Austria) Ingo Gerstl	(Austria) Ingo Gerstl	(Austria) Ingo Gerstl	(Austria) Top Speed	(Switzerland) Alain Valente
7	R14	(Austria) Red Bull Ring, Spielberg	23 September		(Austria) Ingo Gerstl	(Austria) Ingo Gerstl	(Austria) Top Speed	(Italy) Salvatore De Plano

== Championship standings ==
- Points for both championships were awarded as follows:

Race
Position	1st	2nd	3rd	4th	5th	6th	7th	8th	9th	10th	11th	12th	13th	14th	15th	16th	17th
All Races	25	22	20	18	16	14	12	10	9	8	7	6	5	4	3	2	1

=== Drivers Standings ===
Pos	Driver	HOC (Germany)		RBR (Austria)		MNZ (Italy)		HOC (Germany)		ASS (Netherlands)		BRN (Czech Republic)		RBR (Austria)		Points
Open Class
1	(Austria) Ingo Gerstl	1	1	1	1	1	Ret	1	C	1	1	1	1	1	1	300
2	(United States) Phil Stratford	2	2	8	DNS	2	Ret	3	C	2	2	2	2	10	2	240
3	(Germany) Wolfgang Jaksch	DNS	DNS			Ret	1	5	C	3	Ret	3	3			105
4	(Germany) Hans Laub					DNS	DNS	Ret	C					6	12	42
5	(Netherlands) Rinus van Kalmthout					DNS	9									22
	(Austria) Bernd Herndlhofer	DNS	DNS													
	(Germany) Markus Lehmann													DNS	DNS	
Formula Class
1	(Germany) Florian Schnitzenbaumer	3	3	3	5	5	10	6	C	DNS	5	8	6	8	DNS	210
2	(Germany) Andreas Fiedler	6	5	5	7	4	11			4	9	9	7	3	7	196
3	(Switzerland) Christian Eicke	9	9	6	DNS	8	Ret	11	C	7	7	14	11	9	11	136
4	(Germany) Walter Steding	8	8	Ret	DNS	10	5	9	C	8	Ret	12	9	7	DNS	125
5	(Italy) Armando Mangini	5	4	Ret	4	Ret	2	8	C			7	DNS	Ret	DNS	121
6	(Switzerland) Peter Göllner	11	Ret	Ret	DNS			Ret	C	6	4	10	5	4	10	115
7	(Czech Republic) Veronika Cicha	7	Ret			Ret	6	13	C	5	6	15	Ret			86
8	(Italy) Marco Ghiotto					3	3							Ret	4	69
9	(Germany) Karl-Heinz Becker	Ret	7	Ret	8	7	8	10	C							68
10	(Italy) Salvatore De Plano	4	DNS									6	DNS	Ret	3	67
11	(Austria) Bianca Steiner	10	6	4	6			Ret	C							64
12	(Switzerland) Roy Glaser							2	C	Ret	3					50
13	(Austria) Johann Ledermair			2	2											50
14	(Monaco) Marc Faggionato											4	4			50
15	(Austria) Bernd Herndlhofer							4	C			5	Ret			44
16	(Switzerland) Alain Valente			2										2	6	43
17	(Austria) Thomas Jakoubek	DNS	DNS	7	DNS	DNS	DNS	12	C			13	10	DNS	DNS	43
18	(Italy) Gianluca Ripoli							14	C					5	8	39
19	(Italy) Luca Martucci							7	C					DNS	5	38
20	(France) 'Piter'	Ret	Ret			9	7									26
21	(Monaco) Nicolas Matile											11	8			26
22	(Germany) Wolfgang Jordan					6	Ret	15	C							24
23	(Austria) Reinhard Kofler			DNS	3											22
24	(France) David Moretti					Ret	4									20
25	(Switzerland) Martin Kindler	12	10													18
26	(United Kingdom) John Reaks	13	12													15
27	(Italy) Sergio Ghiotto													DNS	9	12
28	(Germany) Hans Laub			Ret	9											10
29	(Austria) Manfred Loach	DNS	11													9
Pos	Driver	HOC (Germany)		RBR (Austria)		MNZ (Italy)		HOC (Germany)		ASS (Netherlands)		BRN (Czech Republic)		RBR (Austria)		Points
