= Cosworth TJ / CA engine =

Overview
- Manufacturer: (United Kingdom) Cosworth
- Production: 2005–2013

Layout
- Configuration: 90° V10 and V8
- Displacement: 3.0 L (2,998 cc); 2.4 L (2,399 cc)
- Cylinder bore: 95 mm (3.7 in); 98 mm (3.9 in)
- Piston stroke: 42.3 mm (1.7 in); 39.75 mm (1.6 in)
- Cylinder block material: Aluminum alloy
- Cylinder head material: Aluminum alloy
- Valvetrain: 32-valve to 40-valve, DOHC, four-valves per cylinder

Combustion
- Turbocharger: No
- Fuel system: Multi-point electronic fuel injection
- Management: Cosworth ECU (2005-2006) later McLaren ECU (2010-2013)
- Oil system: Dry sump

Output
- Power output: 720–915 hp (537–682 kW)
- Torque output: 220–300 lb⋅ft (298–407 N⋅m)

Dimensions
- Dry weight: 95–105 kg (209–231 lb)

Chronology
- Predecessor: Cosworth CR

The TJ and CA series are a family of naturally-aspirated V10 and V8 Formula One racing engines, in both 3-litre and 2.4-litre engine configurations, designed and developed by Cosworth; and produced between 2005 and 2013. The customer engines were used by Minardi, Red Bull, Toro Rosso, Williams, Lotus, HRT, Virgin, and Marussia.

== Background ==
Jaguar pulled out of F1 at the end of 2004, but the team (renamed Red Bull Racing) continued to use Cosworth V10 engines until switching to a Ferrari V8 for 2006. Minardi also used re-badged Cosworth engines until 2005.

Williams began testing the new CA2006 2.4-litre V8 in November 2005, which produced about 755 bhp @ 19,250 rpm (315 hp/L), and began using Cosworth V8 engines for the 2006 season. In the same year, Scuderia Toro Rosso used detuned V10 engines based on the 2005 units.

For 2006, engines had to be a 90° V8 configuration of 2.4 litres maximum capacity with a circular bore of 98 mm (3.9 in) maximum, which implies a 39.8 mm (1.57 in) stroke at maximum bore. The engines must have two inlet and two exhaust valves per cylinder, be naturally aspirated and have a 95 kg (209 lb) minimum weight. The previous year's engines with a rev-limiter were permitted for 2006 and 2007 for teams who were unable to acquire a V8 engine, with Scuderia Toro Rosso using a rev-limited and air-restricted version of the Cosworth TJ2005 V10; after Red Bull's takeover of the former Minardi team did not include the new engines. The 2006 season saw the highest rev limits in the history of Formula One, at well over 20,000 rpm; before a 19,000 rpm mandatory rev limiter was implemented for all competitors in 2007. Cosworth was able to achieve just over 20,000 rpm with their V8.

In 2007, however, the company was left without a partner when Williams chose to switch to Toyota power, and Scuderia Toro Rosso made the switch to Ferrari engines (as used in 2006 by their mother team Red Bull Racing).

In Max Mosley's letter following the withdrawal of Honda from Formula One in December 2008, it was announced that Cosworth had won the tender to provide a standard engine to any interested participants. The new engine would become the standard design and manufacturers could opt to use whole units, construct their own from designs provided by Cosworth, or produce their own engine with the caveat that it be limited to the same power as the new "standard" engine.

In 2010 Cosworth returned as the engine supplier for Williams and three new teams; Hispania Racing, Lotus Racing and Virgin Racing. The CA2010 is the same 2.4-litre V8 base of the CA2006 used by Williams, but has been re-tuned for the then-mandated 18,000 rpm limit required on all engines, down from its original 20,000 rpm implementation. First units were ready and shipped to teams in mid-January for fitting 2 weeks prior to first track testing for the year.

== Complete Formula One results ==
(key)

Year	Entrant	Chassis	Engine	Tyres	Drivers	1	2	3	4	5	6	7	8	9	10	11	12	13	14	15	16	17	18	19	20	Points	WCC
2005	Red Bull Racing	Red Bull RB1	Cosworth TJ2005 3.0 V10	MI		AUS	MAL	BHR	SMR	ESP	MON	EUR	CAN	USA	FRA	GBR	GER	HUN	TUR	ITA	BEL	BRA	JPN	CHN		34	7th
2005	Red Bull Racing	Red Bull RB1	Cosworth TJ2005 3.0 V10	MI	(United Kingdom) David Coulthard	4	6	8	11	8	Ret	4	7	DNS	10	13	7	Ret	7	15	Ret	Ret	6	9		34	7th
2005	Red Bull Racing	Red Bull RB1	Cosworth TJ2005 3.0 V10	MI	(Austria) Christian Klien	7	8	DNS					8	DNS	Ret	15	9	Ret	8	13	9	9	9	5		34	7th
2005	Red Bull Racing	Red Bull RB1	Cosworth TJ2005 3.0 V10	MI	(Italy) Vitantonio Liuzzi				8	Ret	Ret	9														34	7th
2005	Minardi F1 Team	Minardi PS05	Cosworth TJ2005 3.0 V10	B	(Austria) Patrick Friesacher				Ret	Ret	Ret	18	Ret	6	Ret	19										7	10th
2005	Minardi F1 Team	Minardi PS05	Cosworth TJ2005 3.0 V10	B	(Monaco) Robert Doornbos												18	Ret	13	18	13	Ret	14	14^{†}		7	10th
2005	Minardi F1 Team	Minardi PS05	Cosworth TJ2005 3.0 V10	B	(Netherlands) Christijan Albers				Ret	Ret	14	17	11	5	Ret	18	13	NC	Ret	19	12	14	16	16^{†}		7	10th
2006	Williams F1 Team	Williams FW28	Cosworth CA2006 2.4 V8	B		BHR	MAL	AUS	SMR	EUR	ESP	MON	GBR	CAN	USA	FRA	GER	HUN	TUR	ITA	CHN	JPN	BRA			11	8th
2006	Williams F1 Team	Williams FW28	Cosworth CA2006 2.4 V8	B	(Australia) Mark Webber	6	Ret	Ret	6	Ret	9	Ret	Ret	12	Ret	Ret	Ret	Ret	10	10	8	Ret	Ret			11	8th
2006	Williams F1 Team	Williams FW28	Cosworth CA2006 2.4 V8	B	(Germany) Nico Rosberg	7^{F}	Ret	Ret	11	7	11	Ret	9	Ret	9	14	Ret	Ret	Ret	Ret	11	10	Ret			11	8th
2006	Scuderia Toro Rosso	Toro Rosso STR1	Cosworth TJ2005 3.0 V10	MI	(Italy) Vitantonio Liuzzi	11	11	Ret	14	Ret	15^{†}	10	13	13	8	13	10	Ret	Ret	14	10	14	13			1	9th
2006	Scuderia Toro Rosso	Toro Rosso STR1	Cosworth TJ2005 3.0 V10	MI	(United States) Scott Speed	13	Ret	9	15	11	Ret	13	Ret	10	Ret	10	12	11	13	13	14	18^{†}	11			1	9th
2007–2009: Cosworth did not supply any engines in Formula One.
2010	AT&T Williams	Williams FW32	Cosworth CA2010 2.4 V8	B		BHR	AUS	MAL	CHN	ESP	MON	TUR	CAN	EUR	GBR	GER	HUN	BEL	ITA	SIN	JPN	KOR	BRA	ABU		69	6th
2010	AT&T Williams	Williams FW32	Cosworth CA2010 2.4 V8	B	(Brazil) Rubens Barrichello	10	8	12	12	9	Ret	14	14	4	5	12	10	Ret	10	6	9	7	14	12		69	6th
2010	AT&T Williams	Williams FW32	Cosworth CA2010 2.4 V8	B	(Germany) Nico Hülkenberg	14	Ret	10	15	16	Ret	17	13	Ret	10	13	6	14	7	10	Ret	10	8^{P}	16		69	6th
2010	Lotus Racing	Lotus T127	Cosworth CA2010 2.4 V8	B	(Italy) Jarno Trulli	17^{†}	DNS	17	Ret	17	15^{†}	Ret	Ret	21	16	Ret	15	19	Ret	Ret	13	Ret	19	21^{†}		0	10th
2010	Lotus Racing	Lotus T127	Cosworth CA2010 2.4 V8	B	(Finland) Heikki Kovalainen	15	13	NC	14	DNS	Ret	Ret	16	Ret	17	Ret	14	16	18	16^{†}	12	13	18	17		0	10th
2010	Hispania Racing F1 Team	Hispania F110	Cosworth CA2010 2.4 V8	B	(India) Karun Chandhok	Ret	14	15	17	Ret	14^{†}	20^{†}	18	18	19											0	11th
2010	Hispania Racing F1 Team	Hispania F110	Cosworth CA2010 2.4 V8	B	(Brazil) Bruno Senna	Ret	Ret	16	16	Ret	Ret	Ret	Ret	20		19	17	Ret	Ret	Ret	15	14	21	19		0	11th
2010	Hispania Racing F1 Team	Hispania F110	Cosworth CA2010 2.4 V8	B	(Japan) Sakon Yamamoto										20	Ret	19	20	19		16	15				0	11th
2010	Hispania Racing F1 Team	Hispania F110	Cosworth CA2010 2.4 V8	B	(Austria) Christian Klien															Ret			22	20		0	11th
2010	Virgin Racing	Virgin VR-01	Cosworth CA2010 2.4 V8	B	(Germany) Timo Glock	Ret	Ret	Ret	DNS	18	Ret	18	Ret	19	18	18	16	18	17	Ret	14	Ret	20	Ret		0	12th
2010	Virgin Racing	Virgin VR-01	Cosworth CA2010 2.4 V8	B	(Brazil) Lucas di Grassi	Ret	Ret	14	Ret	19	Ret	19	19	17	Ret	Ret	18	17	20^{†}	15	DNS	Ret	NC	18		0	12th
2011	AT&T Williams	Williams FW33	Cosworth CA2011 2.4 V8	P		AUS	MAL	CHN	TUR	ESP	MON	CAN	EUR	GBR	GER	HUN	BEL	ITA	SIN	JPN	KOR	IND	ABU	BRA		5	9th
2011	AT&T Williams	Williams FW33	Cosworth CA2011 2.4 V8	P	(Brazil) Rubens Barrichello	Ret	Ret	13	15	17	9	9	12	13	Ret	13	16	12	13	17	12	15	12	14		5	9th
2011	AT&T Williams	Williams FW33	Cosworth CA2011 2.4 V8	P	(Venezuela) Pastor Maldonado	Ret	Ret	18	17	15	18^{†}	Ret	18	14	14	16	10	11	11	14	Ret	Ret	14	Ret		5	9th
2011	Hispania Racing F1 Team	Hispania F111	Cosworth CA2011 2.4 V8	P	(India) Narain Karthikeyan	DNQ	Ret	23	21	21	17	17	24									17				0	11th
2011	Hispania Racing F1 Team	Hispania F111	Cosworth CA2011 2.4 V8	P	(Australia) Daniel Ricciardo									19	19	18	Ret	NC	19	22	19	18	Ret	20		0	11th
2011	Hispania Racing F1 Team	Hispania F111	Cosworth CA2011 2.4 V8	P	(Italy) Vitantonio Liuzzi	DNQ	Ret	22	22	Ret	16	13	23	18	Ret	20	19	Ret	20	23	21		20	Ret		0	11th
2011	Marussia Virgin Racing	Virgin MVR-02	Cosworth CA2011 2.4 V8	P	(Germany) Timo Glock	NC	16	21	DNS	19	Ret	15	21	16	17	17	18	15	Ret	20	18	Ret	19	Ret		0	12th
2011	Marussia Virgin Racing	Virgin MVR-02	Cosworth CA2011 2.4 V8	P	(Belgium) Jérôme d'Ambrosio	14	Ret	20	20	20	15	14	22	17	18	19	17	Ret	18	21	20	16	Ret	19		0	12th
2012	Marussia F1 Team	Marussia MR01	Cosworth CA2012 2.4 V8	P		AUS	MAL	CHN	BHR	ESP	MON	CAN	EUR	GBR	GER	HUN	BEL	ITA	SIN	JPN	KOR	IND	ABU	USA	BRA	0	11th
2012	Marussia F1 Team	Marussia MR01	Cosworth CA2012 2.4 V8	P	(Germany) Timo Glock	14	17	19	19	18	14	Ret	DNS	18	22	21	15	17	12	16	18	20	14	19	16	0	11th
2012	Marussia F1 Team	Marussia MR01	Cosworth CA2012 2.4 V8	P	(France) Charles Pic	15^{†}	20	20	Ret	Ret	Ret	20	15	19	20	20	16	16	16	Ret	19	19	Ret	20	12	0	11th
2012	HRT Formula 1 Team	HRT F112	Cosworth CA2012 2.4 V8	P	(Spain) Pedro de la Rosa	DNQ	21	21	20	19	Ret	Ret	17	20	21	22	18	18	17	18	Ret	Ret	17	21	17	0	12th
2012	HRT Formula 1 Team	HRT F112	Cosworth CA2012 2.4 V8	P	(India) Narain Karthikeyan	DNQ	22	22	21	Ret	15	Ret	18	21	23	Ret	Ret	19	Ret	Ret	20	21	Ret	22	18	0	12th
2013	Marussia F1 Team	Marussia MR02	Cosworth CA2013 2.4 V8	P		AUS	MAL	CHN	BHR	ESP	MON	CAN	GBR	GER	HUN	BEL	ITA	SIN	KOR	JPN	IND	ABU	USA	BRA		0	10th
2013	Marussia F1 Team	Marussia MR02	Cosworth CA2013 2.4 V8	P	(France) Jules Bianchi	15	13	15	19	18	Ret	17	16	Ret	16	18	19	18	16	Ret	18	20	18	17		0	10th
2013	Marussia F1 Team	Marussia MR02	Cosworth CA2013 2.4 V8	P	(United Kingdom) Max Chilton	17	16	17	20	19	14	19	17	19	17	19	20	17	17	19	17	21	21	19		0	10th

== See also ==
- BMW E41 / P80 engine
- Ferrari V10 engine
- Honda V10 engine
- Mercedes-Benz FO engine
- Renault RS engine
- Toyota RVX engine
