= Hispania F111 =

Formula One racing car

- Vitantonio Liuzzi driving the F111 during the Italian Grand Prix
- Category: Formula One
- Constructor: HRT
- Designers: Geoff Willis (Technical Director); Paul White (Chief Designer)
- Predecessor: Hispania F110
- Successor: HRT F112

Technical specifications
- Engine: Cosworth CA2011 2.4 L (146.5 cu in) V8 (90°), limited to 18,000 RPM, naturally aspirated, mid-mounted
- Transmission: Williams Seven-speed with reverse gear
- Fuel: BP
- Tyres: Pirelli

Competition history
- Notable entrants: Hispania Racing F1 Team (1−9); HRT Formula 1 Team (10−19)
- Notable drivers: 22. (India) Narain Karthikeyan; 22/23. (Australia) Daniel Ricciardo; 23. (Italy) Vitantonio Liuzzi
- Debut: 2011 Australian Grand Prix
- Last event: 2011 Brazilian Grand Prix
Races	Wins	Podiums	Poles	F/Laps
19	0	0	0	0

The Hispania F111, also known as the HRT F111, is a Formula One racing car developed for Hispania Racing. The car competed in the 2011 Formula One season and was the first Formula One car designed by the team as HRT's entry into the 2010 season, the F110, was designed by Dallara. Throughout 2011, the F111 was driven by Narain Karthikeyan, Vitantonio Liuzzi and Daniel Ricciardo.

== Pre-season ==
After struggling both on and off-track in 2010, speculation suggested that the team would not be racing in 2011. The car's development had a chequered history before it was even built, with an arrangement with the remains of Toyota Racing to give the team access to the abandoned TF110 project falling through before it could even be completed, with Toyota citing the uncertain financial condition of the team as the leading cause in the failed joint venture. Later reports suggested that while Hispania no longer had access to the TF110, designer Geoff Willis had been given access to the technical plans of the car for long enough to incorporate ideas from the TF110 into the F111 chassis. Driver Narain Karthikeyan later admitted that the F111 would largely be based on its predecessor, the Hispania F110.

The team set a provisional launch date of 3 March, however, the car was not unveiled until 11 March at the final pre-season test in Barcelona. The team was unable to conduct any testing as key suspension parts that had been flown into the country had not been released by Spanish customs. This made Hispania the twelfth and final team to launch their 2011 car. The late launch date of the car, after the cancellation of the test at the Bahrain International Circuit, one week before the first race of the season, meant that the launch was postponed by just over one week.

== Season summary ==
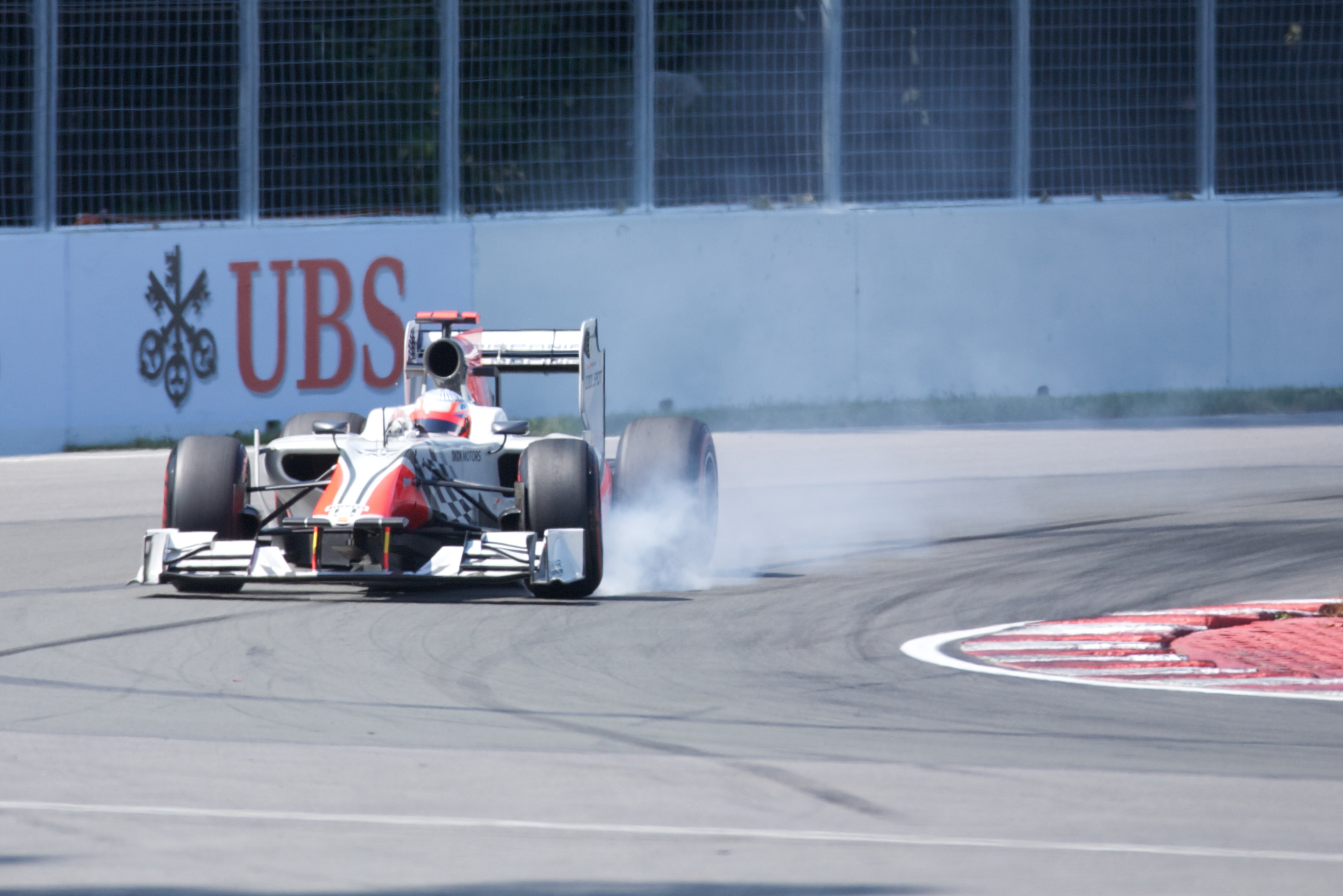
The F111 enjoyed its best race in Canada when Liuzzi finished 13th and Karthikeyan (pictured) finished 17th because of a time penalty which demoted him from 14th to 17th.

The F111 completed its first timed lap in the last 10 minutes of the third practice session of the Australian Grand Prix, driven by Karthikeyan. In qualifying later that day, the car failed to qualify within 107% of pacesetter Sebastian Vettel and was not allowed to start the race. During this race weekend the F111 lacked its nose and front wing which had not then passed crash tests. The car therefore used those that had been designed for the F110. From the next race in Malaysian Grand Prix the correct wing and nose were fitted. The F111 was then able to qualify comfortably within the 107% time, however both cars retired with technical problems.

In the next two races, both cars managed to finish the race. At the Spanish Grand Prix, only Karthikeyan was able to finish the race, while Liuzzi retired with a gearbox problem. In Monaco both drivers crashed in practice and did not enter qualifying, however they were allowed to start the race. Liuzzi finished 16th and Karthikeyan 17th, taking advantage of multiple retirements. In Canada Canadian Grand Prix the team enjoyed their best race to date with Liuzzi and Karthikeyan finishing in 13th and 14th places respectively, ahead of both Virgin drivers and one of the Lotus. However, Karthikeyan was given a post-race penalty which demoted him to 17th place.

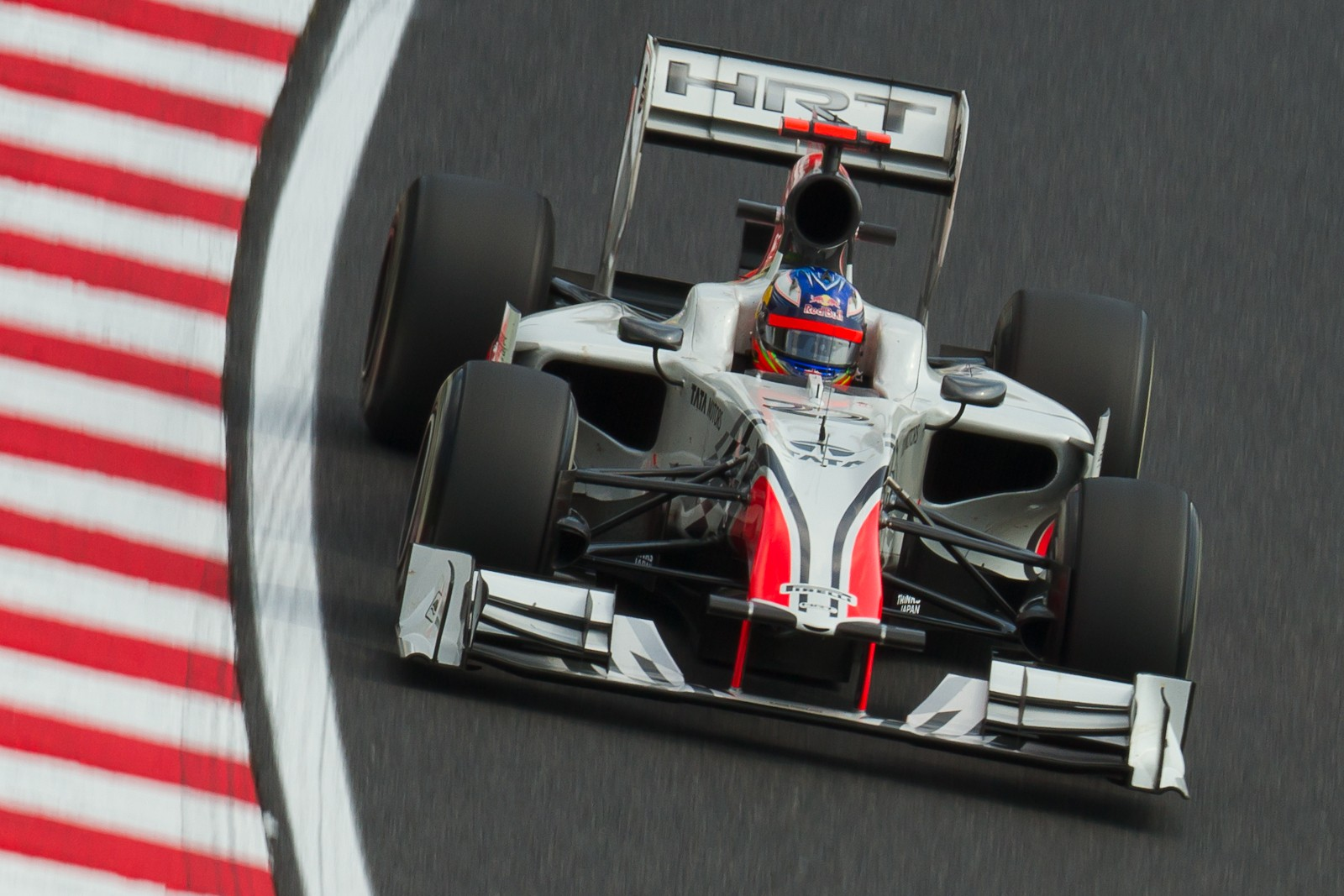
Ricciardo at the Japanese Grand Prix.

Red Bull test driver Daniel Ricciardo was contracted to replace Karthikeyan for all the remaining races starting with the British Grand Prix except the Indian Grand Prix, to allow Karthikeyan to race at his home race. Neither Ricciardo or Liuzzi finished better than 18th in any race.

On 22 October 2011, a few days before the inaugural Indian Grand Prix, Hispania announced that Karthikeyan would drive in place of Liuzzi rather than Ricciardo. Despite picking up damage in the first lap of the race, Karthikeyan managed to beat Ricciardo by 31.8 seconds in the race to finish 17th. Liuzzi returned to replace Karthikeyan for the final two races.

Hispania finished 11th in the World Constructors' Championship, ahead of Virgin.

== Sponsorship and livery ==
The livery is primarily white with red inserts bordered in black on the nose and cockpit. The team employed Hollywood concept vehicle designer Daniel Simon – known for his work on the 2010 film Tron: Legacy – to design the car's livery. Due to a lack of sponsorship, the team wrote various messages on the car, such as "This could be you", "This is a cool spot" and "Your logo here". After being purchased by Thesan Capital halfway through 2011, the messages were replaced by a silver HRT logo. Throughout the season, the Japanese flag was displayed on the car's side fins in response to the Tōhoku earthquake and tsunami.

At the Singapore Grand Prix, the team honored Christian Bakkerud who died in a traffic accident with a logo featuring a ribbon and the text: “Always with us Christian”.

At the Indian Grand Prix, the Hero Motors logo appears on the car's rear wing. At the Brazilian Grand Prix, Interwetten logo are visible on the sides of the car's cockpit.

== 2012 Preseason ==
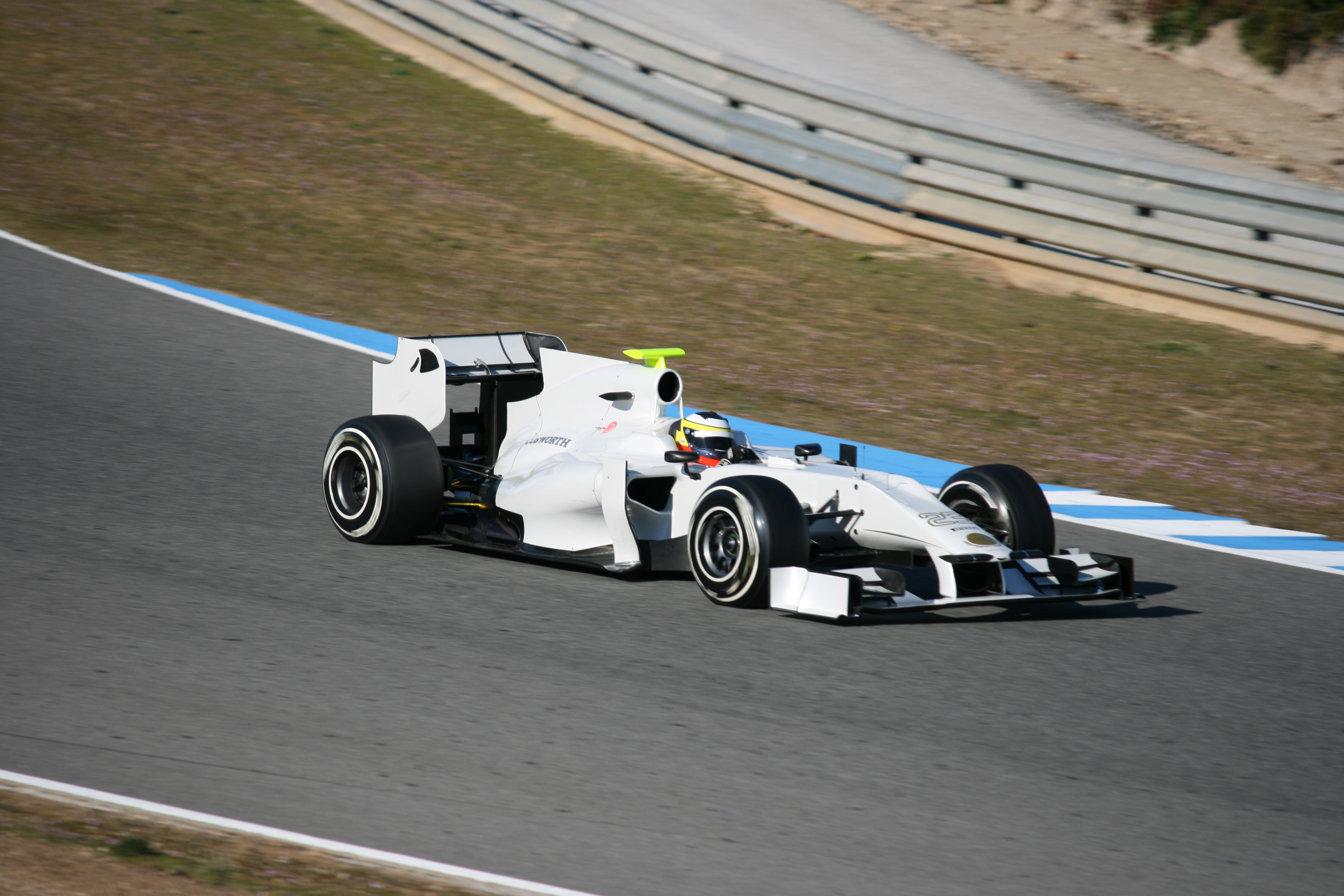
de la Rosa driving F111 during preseason testing in Jerez February 2012.

The Hispania team, renamed HRT by its new owners, Thesan Capital, did not have the single-seater for the following season, the F112, ready for the first pre-season tests at the Jerez Circuit, so it provided the driver Pedro de la Rosa with the F111, with hardly any sponsors, painted completely white, and with new gold logos.

== Complete Formula One results ==
(key)

Year	Entrant	Engine	Tyres	Drivers	1	2	3	4	5	6	7	8	9	10	11	12	13	14	15	16	17	18	19	Points	WCC
2011	Hispania Racing F1 Team	Cosworth CA2011 V8	P		AUS	MAL	CHN	TUR	ESP	MON	CAN	EUR	GBR	GER	HUN	BEL	ITA	SIN	JPN	KOR	IND	ABU	BRA	0	11th
2011	Hispania Racing F1 Team	Cosworth CA2011 V8	P	Karthikeyan	DNQ	Ret	23	21	21	17	17	24		TD				TD	TD	TD	17			0	11th
2011	Hispania Racing F1 Team	Cosworth CA2011 V8	P	Ricciardo									19	19	18	Ret	NC	19	22	19	18	Ret	20	0	11th
2011	Hispania Racing F1 Team	Cosworth CA2011 V8	P	Liuzzi	DNQ	Ret	22	22	Ret	16	13	23	18	Ret	20	19	Ret	20	23	21		20	Ret	0	11th
