= Williams FW32 =

Formula One racing car

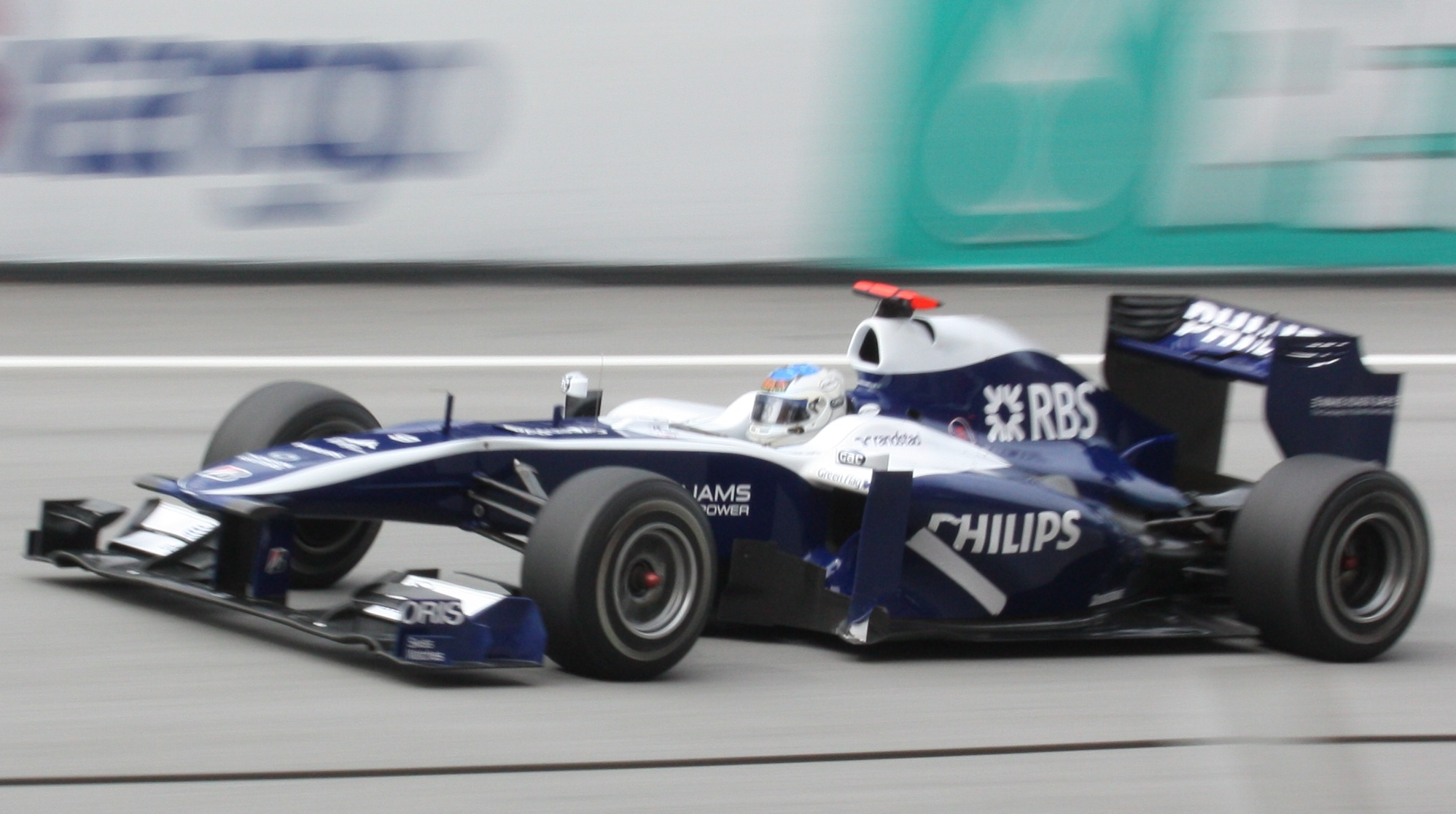
- Rubens Barrichello driving the FW32 at the Malaysian Grand Prix
- Category: Formula One
- Constructor: Williams
- Designers: Sam Michael (Technical Director); Ed Wood (Chief Designer); Clive Cooper (Head of Design - Composites and Structures); Christopher Brawn (Head of Design - Suspension, Steering, Breaks); Mark Loasby (Head of Design - Systems); Jon Tomlinson (Head of Aerodynamics)
- Predecessor: Williams FW31
- Successor: Williams FW33

Technical specifications
- Chassis: Carbon-fibre and honeycomb composite monocoque
- Suspension (front): Carbon-fibre double wishbone arrangement, with composite toelink and pushrod activated springs and anti-roll bar
- Suspension (rear): as front
- Engine: Cosworth CA2010 2.4 L (146 cu in) 90° V8, limited to 18,000 RPM naturally aspirated mid-mounted
- Transmission: Seven-speed semi-automatic gearbox with reverse gear Electro-hydraulically actuated seamless shift
- Weight: 620 kg (1,367 lb) (including driver)
- Fuel: BP
- Tyres: Bridgestone; Rays Wheels (front and rear): 13"

Competition history
- Notable entrants: AT&T Williams
- Notable drivers: 9. (Brazil) Rubens Barrichello; 10. (Germany) Nico Hülkenberg
- Debut: 2010 Bahrain Grand Prix
- Last event: 2010 Abu Dhabi Grand Prix
Races	Wins	Podiums	Poles	F/Laps
19	0	0	1	0

The Williams FW32 was a Formula One motor racing car made by Williams for the 2010 season and powered by the sport's brand-new entry-level Cosworth CA2010 engine. The car was driven by Rubens Barrichello and 2009 GP2 Series champion Nico Hülkenberg.

== Pre-season ==
The car was first driven in shakedown tests at Silverstone on January 28 before it was officially unveiled at the Circuit Ricardo Tormo near Valencia, Spain at the first official test on February 1. After Hülkenberg completed the shakedown at Silverstone, Barrichello was given the first day's running at the test, completing 75 laps.

In pre-season testing, Barrichello finished at the top of the timesheets once, because of rain. In some sessions, Barrichello was outpaced by his rookie teammate Hülkenberg. Williams was the second team in terms of kilometres covered and showed some reliability, but were off pace from front-runners Red Bull, Ferrari, and McLaren.

== 2010 season ==
=== Rounds 1-10 ===
The season started off with Barrichello finishing 10th at the Bahrain Grand Prix, while Hülkenberg made a mistake at turn 6 and skidded across the track, but recovered to 14th. In the next rounds, Barrichello finished 9th in Australia, while Hülkenberg was involved in a first-lap incident with Kamui Kobayashi, after the Japanese driver's front wing failed and sent him into the barrier, rebounding into the path of Hülkenberg.

At the third round in Malaysia, Hülkenberg made it to Q3 for the first time, qualifying in 5th place; out-qualifying teammate Barrichello for the first time. Barrichello stalled at the start due to an overheating clutch, while Hülkenberg started well. He looked set to finish eleventh in the race until Fernando Alonso blew his engine three laps from the end, thus promoting Hülkenberg to tenth place and with the new-for-2010 points system, Hülkenberg scored his first ever Formula One points. The car looked to be a good midfield contender, but in China the cars both finished in non-points positions.

At the Spanish Grand Prix, Barrichello was knocked out in Q1 for the first time. He claimed he had been unable to understand his engineer while out on the circuit. The Circuit de Catalunya has a history of radio-related problems. In the race, Williams gambled on a two-stop strategy for Hülkenberg, a mistake that shunted the German driver down the order where he was caught up in a duel with a struggling Rosberg. Barrichello benefited from Lewis Hamilton's late crash to score two points, finishing in 9th, despite starting 18th on the grid and equalled Ayrton Senna's record of highest-scoring Brazilian driver in Formula One. Williams felt the new Cosworth CA2010 was not good enough and demanded Cosworth to improve the new engine in every area.

At the Monaco Grand Prix, Barrichello qualified 9th, and Hülkenberg 11th. Barrichello moved up to sixth position through the first corner, while Hülkenberg lost control in the middle of the tunnel and hit the wall, damaging his front left suspension and causing a safety car. Later, Barrichello had a suspension failure caused by hitting a loose drain cover coming out of turn 1, and crashed heavily up the hill. After crashing he threw the car's steering wheel out, as he was sitting in the middle of a 120 mph corner with his car on fire. The steering wheel was then run over by Karun Chandhok's Hispania. This was the first double non finish for Williams in the season.

At the Canadian Grand Prix, Barrichello qualified eleventh, narrowly missing Q3 but his anti-stall system kicked in at the start of the race. Kamui Kobayashi and Hülkenberg tangled on the run into the final corners. While Hülkenberg cut the chicane to avoid further contact, Kobayashi was not as lucky and he became the Wall of Champions' 2010 victim. Barrichello recovered well, but he later collided with Jaime Alguersuari when Alguersuari came across too late to cover his line, the damage blocking Barrichello's left brake duct.

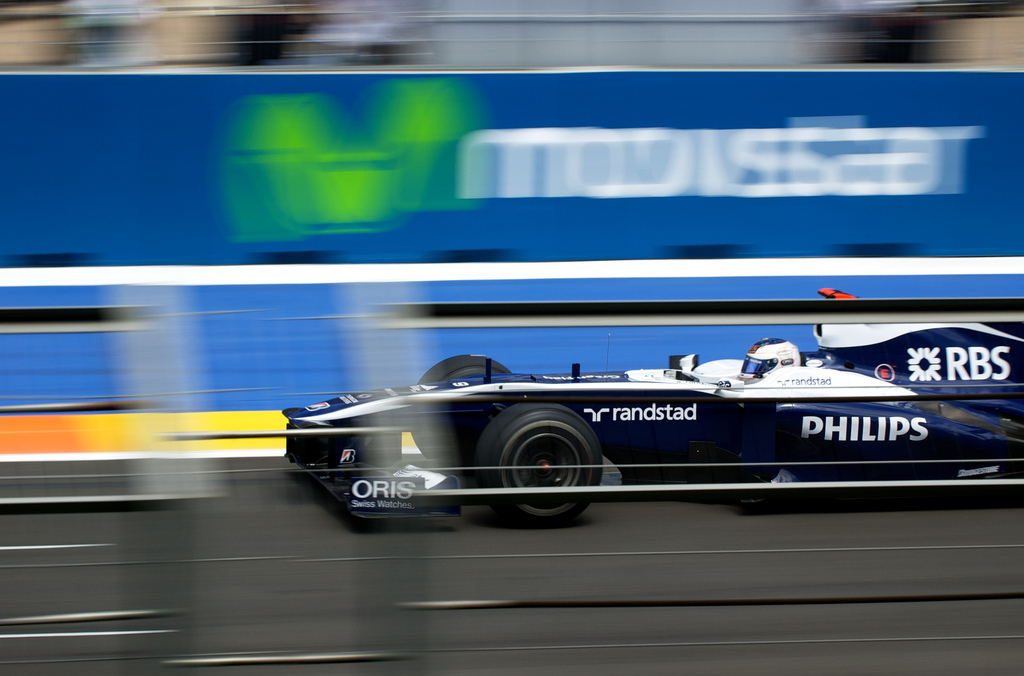
Barrichello took the team's best finish of the season with fourth place in Valencia.

At the European Grand Prix in Valencia, the Williams team brought big upgrades and ran their version of the F-duct. Hülkenberg and Barrichello qualified 8th and 9th respectively, with exactly the same time of 1:38.428. Barrichello made a good start, while Hülkenberg defended his 8th position from Mark Webber. Barrichello was running seventh when the safety car was deployed at the end of lap nine, and pulled straight into the pits. On lap 42, Hülkenberg's car started to emit blue smoke from the rear, but it soon stopped. Hülkenberg's right rear tyre delaminated on lap 50, causing damage to his car's exhaust system and became the race's final retirement, while Barrichello defended from Kubica to finish in a strong 4th place. After the race, both Barrichello and Hülkenberg were issued 5 second time penalties for speeding behind the safety car, but it did not affect Barrichello's finishing position because Kubica and Sutil, the two drivers behind him, also received 5 second time penalties. He became the highest-scoring Brazilian driver in Formula One history, overhauling Ayrton Senna's career tally of 614 points, which he had been tied with since Spain.

At Silverstone, Barrichello again made it into Q3, qualifying 9th. He had a strong race, and finished in 5th. Hülkenberg finished 10th.

=== Rounds 11-19 ===
At the Hungarian Grand Prix, Hülkenberg made it into Q3, with 10th, while Barrichello qualified 12th. Barrichello did not pit when the safety car came out. Williams had been attempting a similar strategy to BMW Sauber with Kamui Kobayashi in Valencia by having Barrichello pit late and charge back up through the field on super-soft tyres. But he was unable to preserve his position and slipped down the order to eleventh behind Schumacher. He then attempted to glide through the field with ease, but quickly became trapped behind his former teammate. Things came to a head late in the race when Barrichello was able to get close enough to pass Schumacher on the main straight, but Schumacher attempted to pin Barrichello to the wall and force him to back off. However, Schumacher's move came too late, and Barrichello was already alongside him when the Mercedes driver moved over. Barrichello very nearly made contact with the concrete pit wall and was forced across the pit exit, but took the place from Schumacher, who was placed under investigation by the stewards for dangerous driving. He was later issued a ten-place grid penalty for his actions, to be taken at the next race in Belgium. Meanwhile, Hülkenberg finished sixth from 10th on the grid, a career best.

Hülkenberg took seventh during the Italian Grand Prix.

Barrichello celebrated his 300th Grand Prix at the Belgian Grand Prix, but retired in damp conditions after colliding with Fernando Alonso's Ferrari on the first lap at the last chicane. Before the race, he was elected as Chairman of the Grand Prix Drivers' Association to replace the outgoing Nick Heidfeld.

In Singapore, the FW32 sported a new front wing, and Barrichello put this to good use to set the sixth fastest time in qualifying, although Williams technical director Sam Michael reckoned the car was fast enough to be a couple of positions higher. In the race, he lost positions to Robert Kubica and Nico Rosberg at the start. Hülkenberg and Petrov's wheels made contact and both drivers went off the circuit on the same lap; Hülkenberg managed to move ahead of Petrov. On lap 44, Hülkenberg, in ninth, made a mistake which allowed Massa to momentarily take advantage, but he fought back and retained ninth position. Massa then overtook both Hülkenberg and Massa, and on the last lap, Hülkenberg was fighting Sutil for 9th, but was held off, and finished 10th. Barrichello had a solid run to sixth at the finish.

At the new Korean Grand Prix, Barrichello qualified 10th and Hülkenberg 11th. In a wet race Barrichello suffered heavy tyre wear on the intermediates that he was running on. Kubica took eighth place from Hülkenberg by taking the inside line at the third corner. Hülkenberg then spun off the track on lap fifty-two and made a pit stop for new tyres because his engineer on the pit-wall told him one of his tyres had developed a slow puncture. In the closing stages of the race Barrichello was passed by Robert Kubica and Vitantonio Liuzzi, dropping him to seventh place at the finish, while Hülkenberg passed Alguersuari on the final lap to finish in tenth.

At Interlagos, with a track drying and no rain falling, the first part of qualifying eliminated the new teams and Adrian Sutil. In Q3, the top ten qualifiers saw a track drying so much that after a round of laps in intermediate tyres and times up to 1:16's, the teams opted for slick tyres. This tyre gamble proved successful for Hülkenberg, who took advantage of the situation and qualified over a second ahead of the next quickest cars, taking his first pole position. This also gave the Williams team their first pole since Nick Heidfeld qualified on pole at the 2005 European Grand Prix, and the first pole for Cosworth since the 1999 French Grand Prix. Hülkenberg gained his first Formula One pole position, by 1.049 seconds over Sebastian Vettel. Barrichello qualified a strong sixth. Hülkenberg lost the lead on the first lap, and he eventually finished the race in eighth place, having been passed by drivers in more competitive cars. For Barrichello, after a delayed pitstop, his traditional bad luck on home soil returned when he suffered a puncture after briefly colliding with Jaime Alguersuari, costing him any chance of scoring points.

In Abu Dhabi Barrichello qualified strongly in seventh place, and maintained that position shortly after the start. However, when the safety car was deployed following Michael Schumacher's and Vitantonio Liuzzi's crash, many drivers like Robert Kubica, Vitaly Petrov and Nico Rosberg took advantage of this by pitting early. This had a negative effect as they did not need to pit again, and Barrichello finished outside of the points. Hülkenberg qualified 15th, and finished 16th. After the race, team boss Frank Williams confirmed that Hülkenberg would not be driving for the team in 2011, while Barrichello would be retained.

By the end of the season, they beat Force India in the constructors championship by 1 point, coming 6th with 69 points.

== Complete Formula One results ==
(key) (results in bold indicate pole position; results in italics indicate fastest lap)

Year	Entrant	Engine	Tyres	Drivers	1	2	3	4	5	6	7	8	9	10	11	12	13	14	15	16	17	18	19	Points	WCC
2010	AT&T Williams	Cosworth CA2010 V8	**B**		BHR	AUS	MAL	CHN	ESP	MON	TUR	CAN	EUR	GBR	GER	HUN	BEL	ITA	SIN	JPN	KOR	BRA	ABU	69	6th
2010	AT&T Williams	Cosworth CA2010 V8	**B**	Barrichello	10	8	12	12	9	Ret	14	14	4	5	12	10	Ret	10	6	9	7	14	12	69	6th
2010	AT&T Williams	Cosworth CA2010 V8	**B**	Hülkenberg	14	Ret	10	15	16	Ret	17	13	Ret	10	13	6	14	7	10	Ret	10	**8**	16	69	6th
