= 2011 Australian Grand Prix =

Race 1 of 19 in the 2011 Formula One World Championship
← Previous race	Next race →

Race details
- Date: 27 March 2011
- Official name: 2011 Formula 1 Qantas Australian Grand Prix
- Location: Melbourne Grand Prix Circuit, Melbourne, Australia
- Course: Temporary street circuit
- Course length: 5.303 km (3.295 miles)
- Distance: 58 laps, 307.574 km (191.118 miles)
- Weather: Sunny, 18°C
- Attendance: 111,000

Pole position
Driver	(Germany) Sebastian Vettel	Red Bull Racing-Renault
- Time: 1:23.529

Fastest lap
Driver	(Brazil) Felipe Massa	Ferrari
- Time: 1:28.947 on lap 55

Podium
First	(Germany) Sebastian Vettel	Red Bull Racing-Renault
Second	(United Kingdom) Lewis Hamilton	McLaren-Mercedes
Third	(Russia) Vitaly Petrov	Renault

The 2011 Australian Grand Prix (formally the 2011 Formula 1 Qantas Australian Grand Prix) was a Formula One motor race held on 27 March 2011 at the Albert Park Circuit in Melbourne. It was the 76th race in the combined history of the Australian Grand Prix that dates back to the 100 Miles Road Race of 1928. Originally planned as the second race of the 2011 Formula One season, it became the season opener with the cancellation of the Bahrain Grand Prix due to civil unrest in the country.

The 58-lap race was won by the reigning World Champion Sebastian Vettel, driving for Red Bull Racing, after starting from pole position. Lewis Hamilton finished second in a McLaren, and Renault's Vitaly Petrov completed the podium in third place, the first and only podium finish of his career and the first podium finish for a Russian national. This was the only race until the 2016 Spanish Grand Prix that neither Mercedes was classified. It was also the Grand Prix debut of Sergio Pérez, who drove for Sauber.

This race also marked Pirelli's return as the sole tyre supplier, replacing Bridgestone, who had supplied tyres to Formula One between 1997 and 2010. It was Pirelli's first race as a tyre supplier since the 1991 edition, and also their first victory as a tyre supplier since the 1991 Canadian Grand Prix. Due to the injury Robert Kubica sustained in a rally accident, Nick Heidfeld made his debut for Renault.

== Report ==
=== Background ===
On the Thursday before the race, the FIA altered the rules for the Drag Reduction System (DRS). Where the original rules were called for markings to be placed on the final 600 metres of the main straight to represent the zone in which the DRS was deployed, this was later changed to encompass the entire length of the front straight, 867 metres in length. The distance between the "detection" and "activation" lines – marking on the circuit that measured the time between two cars and the point from which the DRS could be used – was also extended so as to allow the driver more time to be aware that their DRS system was active.

Tyre supplier Pirelli brought its silver-banded hard compound tyre as the harder "prime" tyre and the yellow-banded soft compound as the softer "option" compound. This was the same tyre selection that Bridgestone had chosen to bring to the Australian Grand Prix in the previous year.

The Friday practice sessions were run in conditions unlike any the teams had experienced during winter testing, with low temperatures, variable wind conditions and intermittent showers late in the afternoon. This made practice a learning experience for the teams, as the Pirelli tyres had a much narrower temperature band than the Bridgestone tyres used in 2010. With the ambient and track temperatures consistently lower than 20 °C (68 °F), the teams struggled to find the optimal performance band for the tyres. Commentators during the support races also noted that because of the proportionately higher number of support races in Melbourne compared to other rounds of the championship and the different makeup of the tyres used in those support categories, the track became "slower" as the day progressed. Where the Formula One cars laid rubber onto the existing racing line, the support races picked the rubber back up or pushed it off the racing line. This was particularly noticeable during qualifying for the V8 Supercars support race shortly after the first practice session.

Several driver changes were also made for the first practice session, with Daniel Ricciardo running in the place of Jaime Alguersuari at Scuderia Toro Rosso, Karun Chandhok assuming Jarno Trulli's seat at Team Lotus, and Nico Hülkenberg driving for Force India in the place of Paul di Resta.

Heading into the race, Sebastian Vettel had won 3 of the last 4 Grands Prix (and had retired from the lead of the race he didn't win), as well as being crowned World Champion. Both he, and his new car (the Red Bull RB7) looked in good form to defend their titles.

The race was held two weeks after the Tōhoku earthquake and tsunami, several teams decided to paid a tribute on their cars.

=== Practice ===
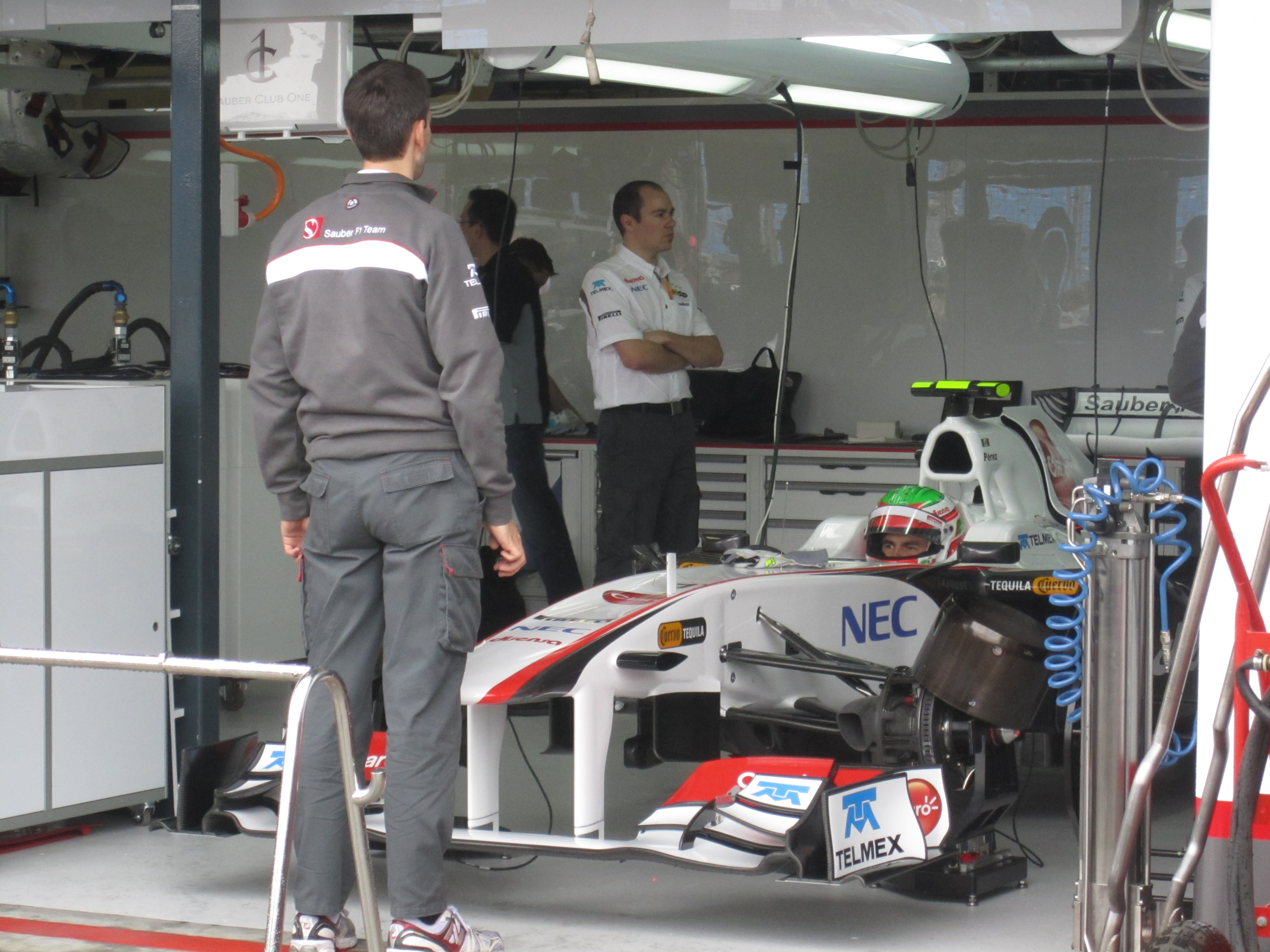
Sergio Pérez made his Grand Prix début with Sauber.

Red Bull Racing led the first practice session, with Mark Webber finishing three tenths of a second quicker than reigning World Champion Sebastian Vettel and almost a second faster than Fernando Alonso. Vettel experienced a blistered front tyre that initially caused concerns over the integrity of the Pirelli tyres, but was later revealed to be a phenomenon experienced by several teams during winter testing. The session was marked by an early accident involving Karun Chandhok. The Indian driver was the first car to take to the circuit and lost control on his installation lap, spinning off and crashing into a wall on the exit of turn three. The team recorded no mechanical failures and attributed the crash to driver error. Several other drivers, including Felipe Massa, Vitaly Petrov and Nico Rosberg all experienced troubles at the third corner, running wide into the gravel trap. The damage to Chandhok's car was minimal, and Jarno Trulli was able to resume his seat in time for the second practice session.

Despite claiming during the off-season that they were a second behind their rivals, McLaren followed Red Bull in claiming the two fastest times in the second session, with Jenson Button a tenth of a second faster than Lewis Hamilton, Alonso and Vettel. Intermittent showers late in the afternoon led to race control declaring the circuit to be wet, but no driver used the wet or intermediate tyres, and a dry line was quickly established. The final half hour was run under race conditions as a simulation of the DRS in order to check that the system was properly implemented. As most of the times during the day had been set with the aid of an unrestricted DRS, no driver recorded a fastest time for the session once the simulation had begun.

Hispania Racing did not take part in the first practice session, with the team spending most of the day building both of their cars in the pit garage. Vitantonio Liuzzi was able to leave the garage three minutes before the end of the second practice session and completed an installation lap, but did not set a time. Narain Karthikeyan did not take to the circuit. Both cars were able to take to the circuit for the third practice session, with Karthikeyan setting a fastest lap some fourteen seconds slower than the fastest man of the session, Sebastian Vettel. Liuzzi was unable to set a time after his car abruptly lost all drive on his installation lap and he was towed from the circuit, though the team were able to resolve the problems in time for qualifying. However, as their 2011-specification front wing failed a mandatory crash test, the team was forced to use the 2010 wing, which was not designed in conjunction with their new aerodynamics package, thus leading to a car that was operating at less than peak aerodynamic efficiency. The session was otherwise incident-free, although Williams experienced delays when a gearbox problem kept Rubens Barrichello in his pit garage and Pastor Maldonado spun off the circuit and was unable to rejoin which meant they joined Pérez, Karthikeyan and Liuzzi to complete less than 10 laps in practice 3.

=== Qualifying ===
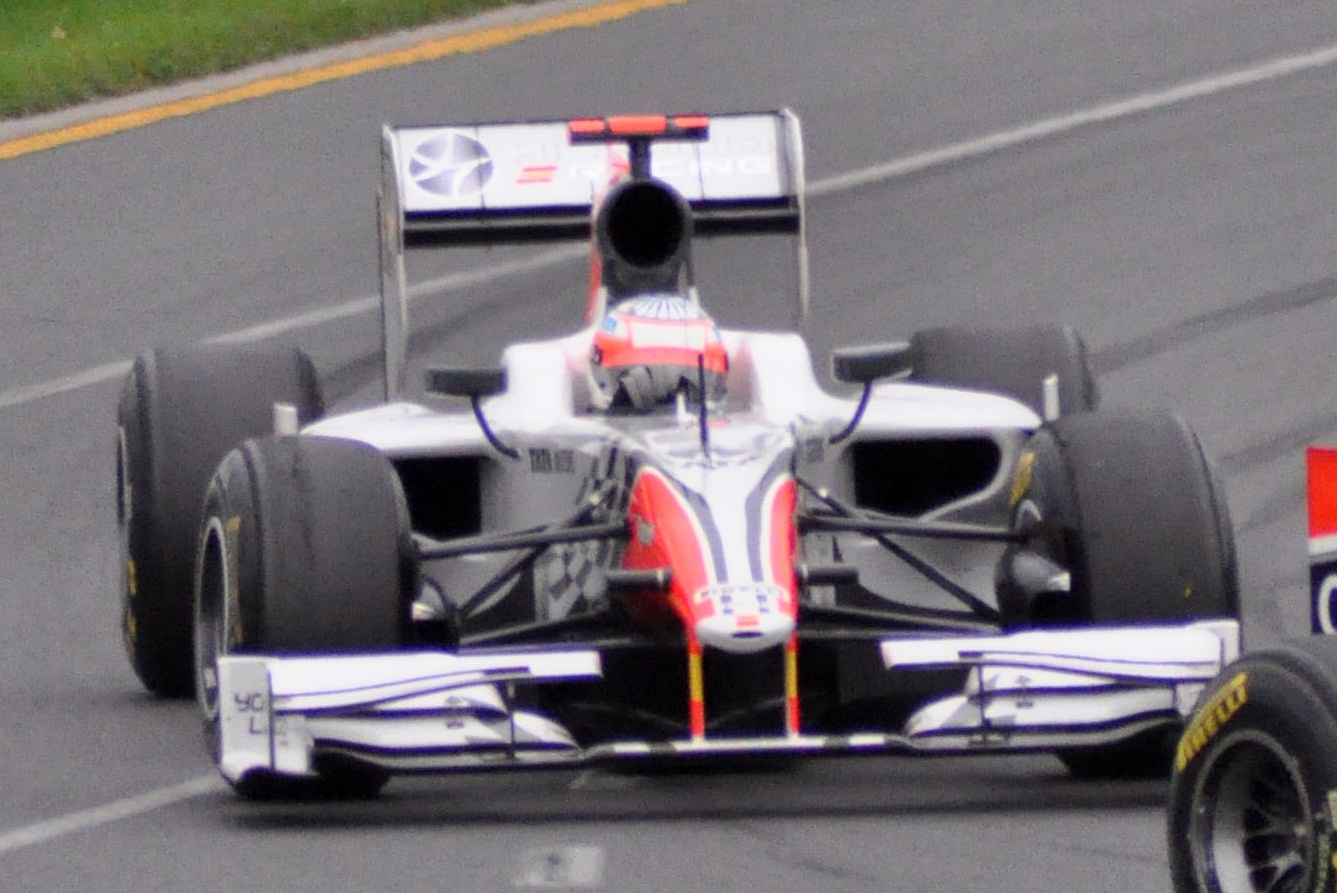
Narain Karthikeyan at the wheel of one of the Hispania F111s. Karthikeyan and team-mate Vitantonio Liuzzi failed to qualify for the race as they were outside 107% of Sebastian Vettel's time in the first part of qualifying.

The first qualifying period opened with uncertainty over whether as many as four cars would be able to qualify. Hispania's limited running and poor lap times made qualification unlikely, while Virgin Racing admitted that they were concerned they would not be able to race when Timo Glock's best time in the third practice session was just two tenths of a second inside 107% of Sebastian Vettel's best time while Jérôme d'Ambrosio was well outside the benchmark. Both Virgins were able to qualify, taking the final two places on the grid while the Hispanias were both eliminated for being outside 107% of provisional pole-sitter's time. They later requested to be allowed to race, citing "exceptional circumstances", but were refused by the stewards. Lotus were also eliminated in Q1, causing surprise within the team, who had expected to be much closer to the midfield. Nick Heidfeld was the other Q1 elimination, first of all experiencing a problem with the KERS device on his R31 and later encountering traffic that compromised his flying lap. Several teams, including Ferrari, were forced to sacrifice a set of soft tyres simply to progress to Q2.

The second session opened with a mistake from Rubens Barrichello that saw him spin off. He failed to set a time, and so qualified seventeenth on the grid. Sauber's Sergio Pérez also struggled with a hydraulics problem that cost him track time. Michael Schumacher failed to advance to Q3 by one hundredth of a second. Jaime Alguersuari qualified twelfth, followed by rookie drivers Pérez, Paul di Resta and Pastor Maldonado. Adrian Sutil was left sixteenth on the grid when, on a fast flying lap, he activated his DRS and KERS devices simultaneously as he came out of the final corner, pitching him into a spin. Although he was able to avoid contact with the walls, the spin compromised both his flying and final laps.

The final session started with Sebastian Vettel setting a time that quickly proved to be unbeatable. Mark Webber held second place for much of the period before Lewis Hamilton and Jenson Button were able to split the Red Bull cars. Webber was able to reclaim third from Button, but was mystified as to his lack of pace compared to his team-mate; Vettel was almost a second faster than Hamilton. He was observed to set a similar time later in the session without using his KERS device at all during the lap. Fernando Alonso tailed the McLaren cars in fifth, bemused at his car's lack of pace after early promise in free practice. Vitaly Petrov was sixth for Renault, ahead of Nico Rosberg in the second Mercedes, Felipe Massa, Kamui Kobayashi and Sébastien Buemi.

=== Race ===
Speculation before the race suggested that Red Bull were using a "start-only KERS" device that had been deliberately designed to be used to aid their drivers at the start of the race at the expense of using the device for the duration of the Grand Prix. This was seemingly supported by telemetry that showed Sebastian Vettel did not touch his KERS button during his qualifying laps, but team principal Christian Horner revealed post-race that the team had never fitted either of their cars with KERS during qualifying or the race and kept the decision a secret so as to mislead their opposition.

Vettel made the best start from pole whereas the McLarens of Hamilton and Jenson Button started slowly from second and fourth on the dirty side of the grid. This left Vettel unchallenged into the first corner, with Hamilton's KERS button allowing him to just keep second from Webber. Button was unable to defend his position as he was under challenge from Fernando Alonso and Vitaly Petrov. Petrov took fourth and Alonso was pushed on the grass and dropped back, while Button dropped to sixth behind Felipe Massa. In the middle of the pack, there was a collision between Michael Schumacher and Jaime Alguersuari as a result of which both drivers had to pit for repairs; Schumacher for a puncture and Alguersuari for a front wing. The rest of the field passed through the first lap safely, sparing a run across the gravel for Rubens Barrichello in an attempt to avoid the incident, which dropped him to last.

Sebastian Vettel was 2.4 seconds ahead of Hamilton at the end of the first lap, and he increased it to 3.2 seconds at the end of lap 2, with Webber right behind Hamilton. Hamilton then began to respond to Vettel's fast laps, easily pulling away from Webber and keeping the gap to Vettel around 3 seconds. Webber and Petrov were comfortable in third and fourth, with the main battle on the track being Jenson Button's repeated attempts to get fifth from Massa. Button tried many times to pass Massa, but his attempts were to no avail until lap 11 when he went around the outside of the Brazilian at the fast Turn 11 chicane. Button was forced to cut the chicane to complete his overtake and was given a drive-through penalty despite stating in a radio transmission that he felt he had the position when he was forced off the circuit. Massa lost momentum and was passed by the recovering Fernando Alonso in the sister Ferrari, compromising Button's position further, as in order to give the position back to Massa he would have had to let both Ferraris past. At the front, Vettel was only 1.5 seconds ahead of Hamilton when he made his first stop and rejoined fourth behind Button who was yet to serve his drive-through and make his tyre stop. Button made an attempt to hold Vettel up in order to aid teammate Hamilton, though Vettel quickly passed him and set the fastest lap of the race on new tyres. Hamilton pitted two laps later, but this proved to be a disadvantage as he rejoined nearly seven seconds behind Vettel. Webber, Petrov, Alonso and Massa followed; the former rejoining on hard tyres unlike all the others.

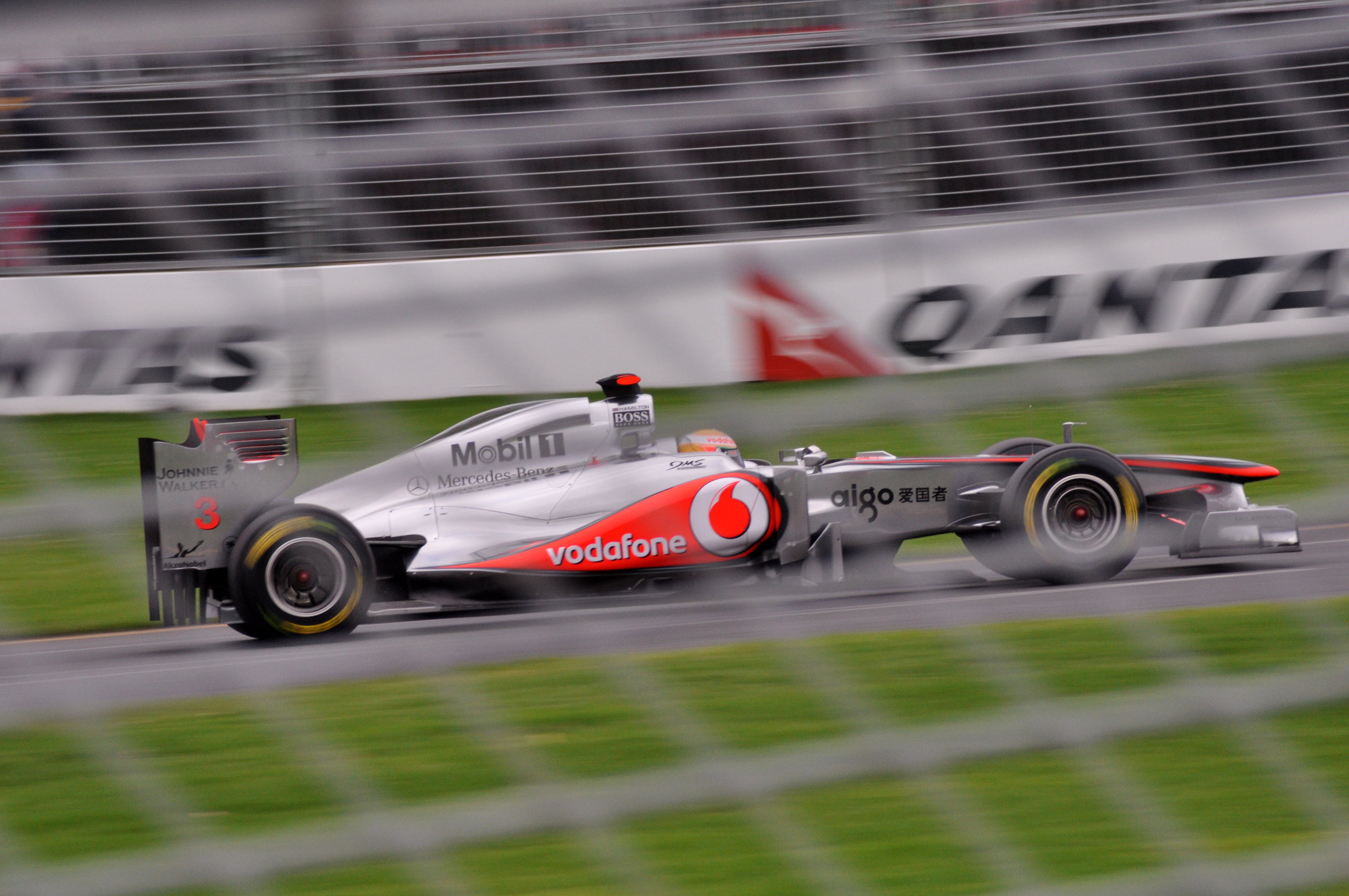
Lewis Hamilton was Sebastian Vettel's closest challenger all weekend finishing 22 seconds off the lead.

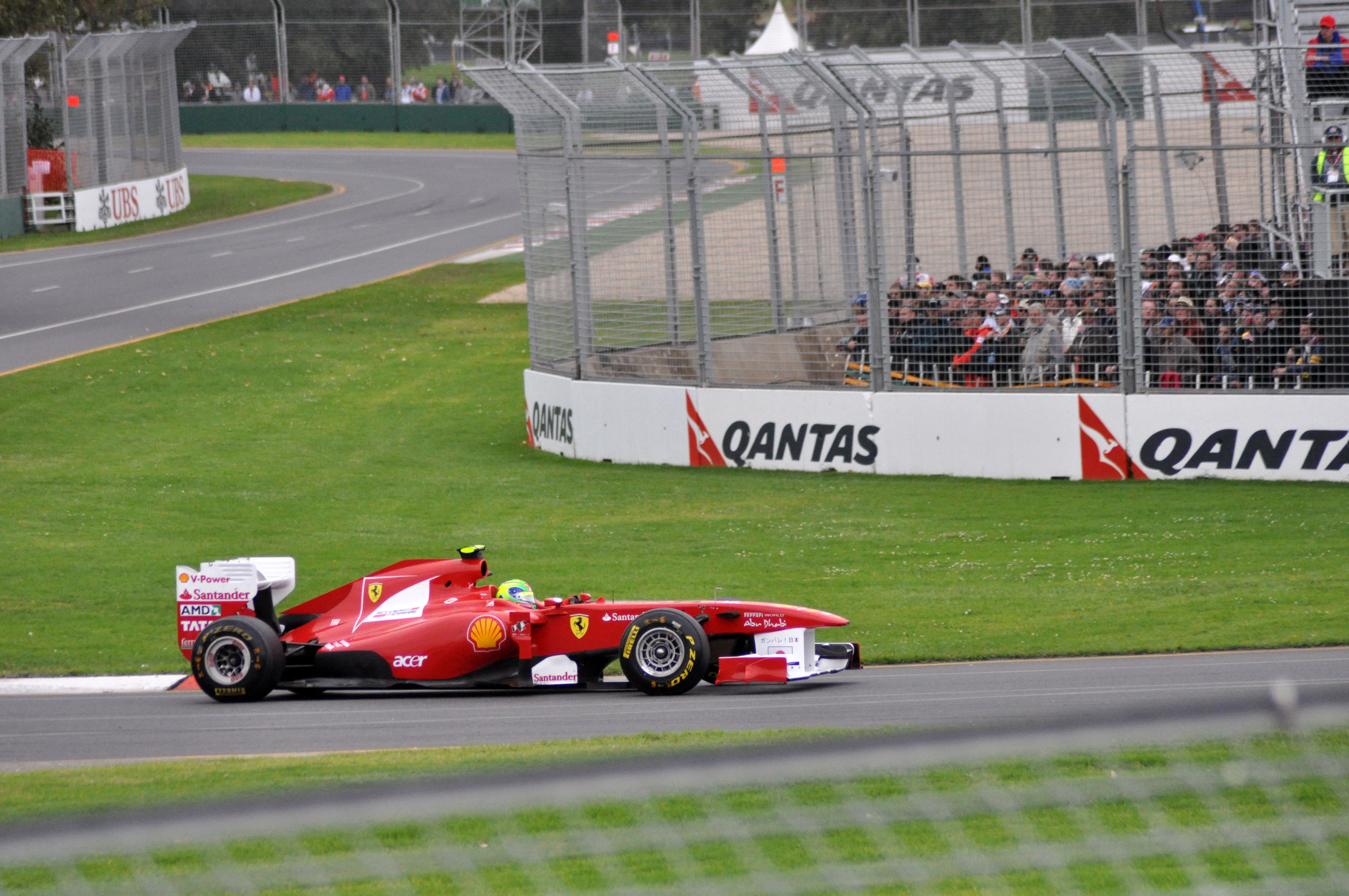
Felipe Massa had a disappointing race, and finished down in ninth place (which became seventh after the race, due to the Saubers' disqualification).

Pastor Maldonado was the first retirement of the race, pulling over to the side of the circuit with an undiagnosed technical problem that the team later traced back to a problem with the transmission. He was joined several laps later by Michael Schumacher, who had sustained damage from contact with Alguersuari, and the Mercedes team felt it was better to retire than to continue on and risk further damage to the car. Heikki Kovalainen retired his Lotus T128 on the same lap with a water leak, whilst Timo Glock left the pits with front left wheel incorrectly fitted and did a lap at walking pace before he returned to park in the garage to fix the pegs and later rejoined the circuit. As he completed less than 90% of the race winner's distance, he was not classified in the final standings.

Later in the race, Alonso and Webber made their second stops much earlier than the others, and a greater picture began to emerge. The new Pirellis afforded several different pit strategies; where Vettel, Hamilton and Petrov were all running two-stop strategies, Alonso and Webber nominated a third stop each. Further down the field, rookie Sergio Pérez defied all expectations by making a single stop in his Sauber. Jenson Button was also running on a two-stop strategy, and had managed to climb back up through the field to be in the points at the halfway point despite his drive-through penalty. Elsewhere, Nico Rosberg joined team-mate Schumacher in retirement when Barrichello attempted a pass up the inside into turn three that damaged the Mercedes' side pod, and turned Barrichello around. Rosberg's car gave off blue smoke during the half-a-lap after the collision and he was able to park the Mercedes safely by the circuit, removing the need for the safety car to deploy. Rubens Barrichello later retired his Williams with a similar problem to team-mate Maldonado, leaving the team pointless.

With the race moving into its final phase, Webber and Alonso both pitted, rejoining the circuit some twenty seconds behind Petrov. Lewis Hamilton had an off-track excursion at the first corner that damaged his undertray. It was enough to stop him from mounting a challenge towards Vettel, but he was able to remain in second place as Webber and Alonso closed on Petrov. Vettel went on to win the race by twenty-two seconds from Hamilton, to become the first driver to win three consecutive Grands Prix since Button won four races in succession in May and June 2009. Alonso rapidly caught Petrov, but Petrov held on long enough to secure third place, the only podium finish of his career. With Alonso fourth, Mark Webber equalled his best result at Albert Park, finishing fifth. Jenson Button finished sixth ahead of the Saubers of Sergio Pérez in seventh and Kamui Kobayashi in eighth, while Felipe Massa crossed the line ninth, almost ninety seconds behind Vettel. Sébastien Buemi claimed the final championship point in tenth, one lap down.

=== Post-race ===
During post-race inspection both Saubers of Kobayashi and Pérez were found not to comply with sporting regulations due to a technical infringement involving the uppermost element of the rear wing, disqualifying them both from the standings. The race results were adjusted with Massa placed seventh, Buemi in eighth, and the Force Indias of Adrian Sutil and Paul di Resta promoted into ninth and tenth – and points-scoring positions – respectively. After the race, Sauber stated that they intended to appeal the decision, but elected not to on 29 March after an internal investigation found a manufacturing fault was responsible for producing parts that did not comply with the regulations, though technical director James Key claimed the offending parts offered no additional performance to the car.

A race start in this race ensured that Rubens Barrichello had officially started a race in 19 separate Formula One seasons, breaking the previous record of 18 held by Graham Hill.

== Classification ==
=== Qualifying ===
Pos	No	Driver	Constructor	Part 1	Part 2	Part 3	Grid
1	1	(Germany) Sebastian Vettel	Red Bull Racing-Renault	1:25.296	1:24.090	1:23.529	1
2	3	(United Kingdom) Lewis Hamilton	McLaren-Mercedes	1:25.384	1:24.595	1:24.307	2
3	2	(Australia) Mark Webber	Red Bull Racing-Renault	1:25.900	1:24.658	1:24.395	3
4	4	(United Kingdom) Jenson Button	McLaren-Mercedes	1:25.886	1:24.957	1:24.779	4
5	5	(Spain) Fernando Alonso	Ferrari	1:25.707	1:25.242	1:24.974	5
6	10	(Russia) Vitaly Petrov	Renault	1:25.543	1:25.582	1:25.247	6
7	8	(Germany) Nico Rosberg	Mercedes	1:25.856	1:25.606	1:25.421	7
8	6	(Brazil) Felipe Massa	Ferrari	1:26.031	1:25.611	1:25.599	8
9	16	(Japan) Kamui Kobayashi	Sauber-Ferrari	1:25.717	1:25.405	1:25.626	9
10	18	(Switzerland) Sébastien Buemi	Toro Rosso-Ferrari	1:26.232	1:25.882	1:27.066	10
11	7	(Germany) Michael Schumacher	Mercedes	1:25.962	1:25.971		11
12	19	(Spain) Jaime Alguersuari	Toro Rosso-Ferrari	1:26.620	1:26.103		12
13	17	(Mexico) Sergio Pérez	Sauber-Ferrari	1:25.812	1:26.108		13
14	15	(United Kingdom) Paul di Resta	Force India-Mercedes	1:27.222	1:26.739		14
15	12	(Venezuela) Pastor Maldonado	Williams-Cosworth	1:26.298	1:26.768		15
16	14	(Germany) Adrian Sutil	Force India-Mercedes	1:26.245	1:31.407		16
17	11	(Brazil) Rubens Barrichello	Williams-Cosworth	1:26.270	No time^{1}		17
18	9	(Germany) Nick Heidfeld	Renault	1:27.239			18
19	20	(Finland) Heikki Kovalainen	Lotus-Renault	1:29.254			19
20	21	(Italy) Jarno Trulli	Lotus-Renault	1:29.342			20
21	24	(Germany) Timo Glock	Virgin-Cosworth	1:29.858			21
22	25	(Belgium) Jérôme d'Ambrosio	Virgin-Cosworth	1:30.822			22
107% time: 1:31.267
DNQ	23	(Italy) Vitantonio Liuzzi	HRT-Cosworth	1:32.978			DNQ^{2}
DNQ	22	(India) Narain Karthikeyan	HRT-Cosworth	1:34.293			DNQ^{2}

Notes

- ^1 – Rubens Barrichello failed to set a lap time in Q2 after spinning into the gravel at the third corner.
- ^2 – Narain Karthikeyan and Vitantonio Liuzzi failed to set a time within the 107% time and didn’t set an eligible practice time in order to start the race, they were denied permission to start the race.

=== Race ===
Pos	No	Driver	Constructor	Laps	Time/Retired	Grid	Points
1	1	(Germany) Sebastian Vettel	Red Bull Racing-Renault	58	1:29:30.259	1	25
2	3	(United Kingdom) Lewis Hamilton	McLaren-Mercedes	58	+22.297	2	18
3	10	(Russia) Vitaly Petrov	Renault	58	+30.560	6	15
4	5	(Spain) Fernando Alonso	Ferrari	58	+31.772	5	12
5	2	(Australia) Mark Webber	Red Bull Racing-Renault	58	+38.171	3	10
6	4	(United Kingdom) Jenson Button	McLaren-Mercedes	58	+54.304	4	8
7	6	(Brazil) Felipe Massa	Ferrari	58	+1:25.186	8	6
8	18	(Switzerland) Sébastien Buemi	Toro Rosso-Ferrari	57	+1 Lap	10	4
9	14	(Germany) Adrian Sutil	Force India-Mercedes	57	+1 Lap	16	2
10	15	(United Kingdom) Paul di Resta	Force India-Mercedes	57	+1 Lap	14	1
11	19	(Spain) Jaime Alguersuari	Toro Rosso-Ferrari	57	+1 Lap	12	
12	9	(Germany) Nick Heidfeld	Renault	57	+1 Lap	18	
13	21	(Italy) Jarno Trulli	Lotus-Renault	56	+2 Laps	20	
14	25	(Belgium) Jérôme d'Ambrosio	Virgin-Cosworth	54	+4 Laps	22	
NC	24	(Germany) Timo Glock	Virgin-Cosworth	49	+9 Laps^{3}	21	
Ret	11	(Brazil) Rubens Barrichello	Williams-Cosworth	48	Transmission	17	
Ret	8	(Germany) Nico Rosberg	Mercedes	22	Collision damage	7	
Ret	20	(Finland) Heikki Kovalainen	Lotus-Renault	19	Water leak	19	
Ret	7	(Germany) Michael Schumacher	Mercedes	19	Collision damage	11	
Ret	12	(Venezuela) Pastor Maldonado	Williams-Cosworth	9	Transmission	15	
DSQ	17	(Mexico) Sergio Pérez	Sauber-Ferrari	58	Illegal rear wing (+1:05.845)^{4}	13	
DSQ	16	(Japan) Kamui Kobayashi	Sauber-Ferrari	58	Illegal rear wing (+1:16.872)^{4}	9	
DNQ	23	(Italy) Vitantonio Liuzzi	HRT-Cosworth	-	Failed to reach 107% time	-	
DNQ	22	(India) Narain Karthikeyan	HRT-Cosworth	-	Failed to reach 107% time	-	

Notes

- ^3 – Timo Glock was not classified as he did not finish 90% of the race distance.
- ^4 – Sergio Pérez and Kamui Kobayashi finished 7th and 8th, but were disqualified after the race as they were found to have illegal rear wings on their cars.

== Championship standings after the race ==
Drivers' Championship standings

Pos	Driver	Points
1	(Germany) Sebastian Vettel	25
2	(United Kingdom) Lewis Hamilton	18
3	(Russia) Vitaly Petrov	15
4	(Spain) Fernando Alonso	12
5	(Australia) Mark Webber	10

Constructors' Championship standings

Pos	Constructor	Points
1	(Austria) Red Bull Racing-Renault	35
2	(United Kingdom) McLaren-Mercedes	26
3	(Italy) Ferrari	18
4	(United Kingdom) Renault	15
5	(Italy) Toro Rosso-Ferrari	4

- Note: Only the top five positions are included for both sets of standings.

Previous race: 2010 Abu Dhabi Grand Prix; 2011 Bahrain Grand Prix cancelled	FIA Formula One World Championship; 2011 season	Next race: 2011 Malaysian Grand Prix
Previous race: 2010 Australian Grand Prix	Australian Grand Prix	Next race: 2012 Australian Grand Prix
