= 2011 Malaysian Grand Prix =

Race 2 of 19 in the 2011 Formula One World Championship
← Previous race	Next race →

Race details
- Date: 10 April 2011
- Official name: 2011 Petronas Malaysia Grand Prix
- Location: Sepang International Circuit; Sepang, Selangor, Malaysia
- Course: Permanent racing facility
- Course length: 5.543 km (3.444 miles)
- Distance: 56 laps, 310.408 km (192.879 miles)
- Weather: Cloudy, dry
- Attendance: 105,018 (Weekend)

Pole position
Driver	(Germany) Sebastian Vettel	Red Bull Racing-Renault
- Time: 1:34.870

Fastest lap
Driver	(Australia) Mark Webber	Red Bull Racing-Renault
- Time: 1:40.571 on lap 46

Podium
First	(Germany) Sebastian Vettel	Red Bull Racing-Renault
Second	(United Kingdom) Jenson Button	McLaren-Mercedes
Third	(Germany) Nick Heidfeld	Renault

The 2011 Malaysian Grand Prix (formally the 2011 Formula 1 Petronas Malaysia Grand Prix) was a Formula One motor race held on 10 April 2011 at the Sepang International Circuit in Sepang, Selangor, Malaysia. It was the second round of the 2011 Formula One World Championship. The 56-lap race was won by Red Bull Racing driver Sebastian Vettel after starting from pole position. Jenson Button finished second in a McLaren, and Nick Heidfeld completed the podium for Renault, in third place, his last podium finish.

As a consequence of the race, Vettel extended his lead in the World Drivers' Championship to 24 championship points over Button. Button's McLaren teammate Lewis Hamilton, who finished eighth in Malaysia, fell four championship points behind Button in third, tied on points with Mark Webber who finished fourth in the race. In the World Constructors' Championship, Red Bull's 37-point haul from the weekend allowed them to extend the championship lead over McLaren to 24 championship points, with Ferrari a further 12 championship points behind in third position.

== Background ==
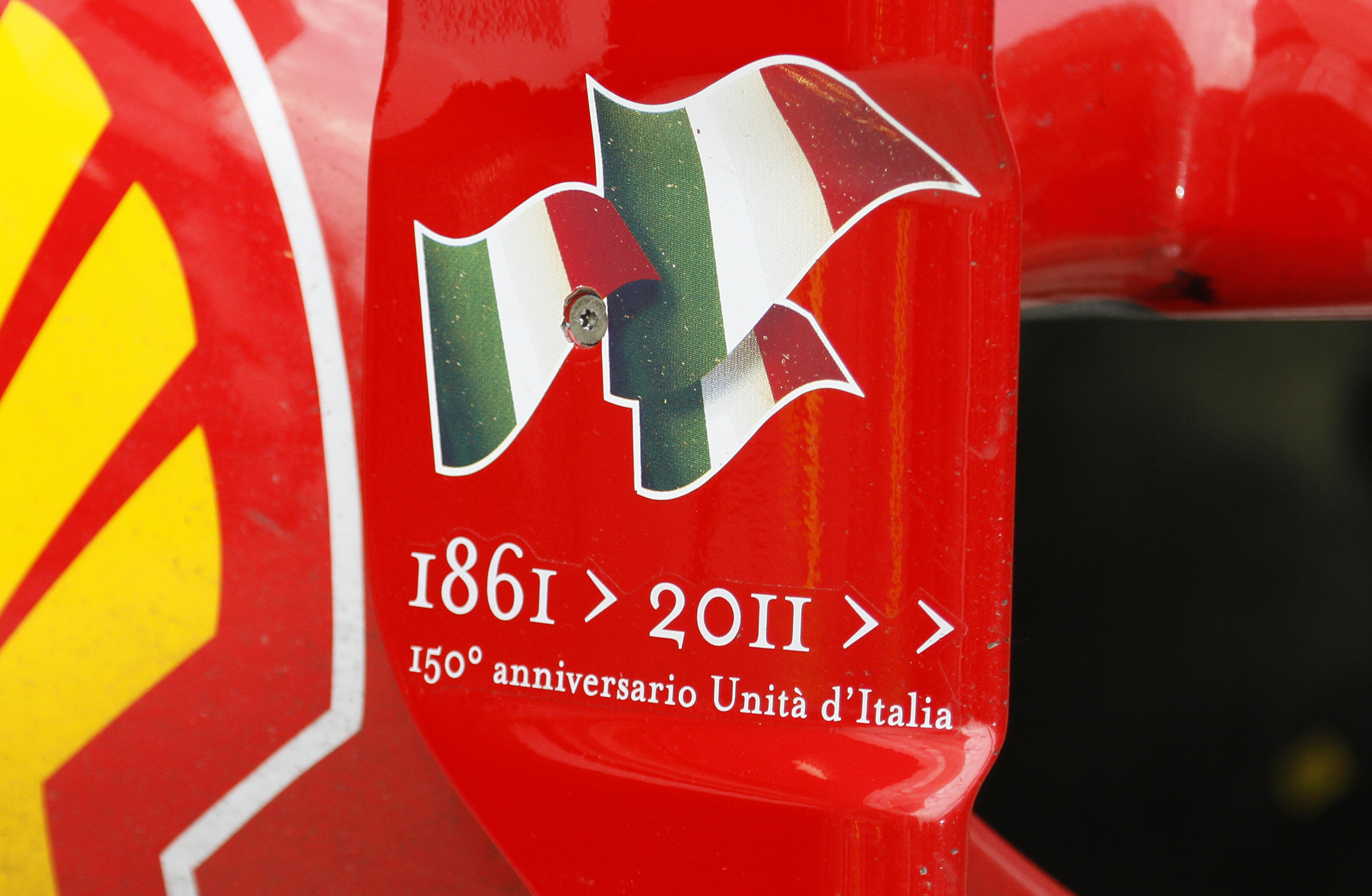
Ferrari were celebrating the 150th anniversary of the unification of Italy

The 2011 Malaysian Grand Prix, held on 10 April 2011, was the second of nineteen rounds of the 2011 Formula One World Championship, and the 13th to be run at the 15-turn, 5.543 km (3.444 mi) Sepang International Circuit in Sepang, Selangor, Malaysia. Tyre supplier Pirelli brought its silver-banded hard compound tyre as the harder "prime" tyre and the yellow-banded soft compound as the softer "option" compound. The single drag reduction system (DRS) activation zone was extended from 600 m (2,000 ft) to 700 m (2,300 ft) as it was ineffective in increasing the number of overtakes in Australia and placed on the main straight linking the final and first corners, instead of at the run to the final turn as the Fédération Internationale de l'Automobile (FIA; Formula One's governing body) believed had already been established as an overtaking area. The JK Racing Asia Series and the Malaysia Super Series held support races during the race weekend.

After winning the season-opening Australian Grand Prix two weeks earlier, Red Bull's Sebastian Vettel led the World Drivers' Championship with 25 championship points, seven ahead of McLaren's Lewis Hamilton and ten in front of Renault's Vitaly Petrov. Ferrari's Fernando Alonso was fourth and Vettel's teammate Mark Webber was fifth. In the World Constructors' Championship, Red Bull Racing led with 35 championship points. McLaren were nine championship points behind second and the third-placed Ferrari were another eight behind McLaren. Renault were in fourth with 15 championship points, 11 ahead of Toro Rosso in fifth.

The Sepang International Circuit hosted the first Grand Prix of the season to be held on a permanent race track and would experience hot and humid conditions. McLaren managing director Jonathan Neale believed forecasts of inclement weather in Malaysia combined with Pirelli's less durable tyres would see the title-contesting teams be thoroughly tested, while the team's CEO Martin Whitmarsh emphasised the race would be a challenge for everyone due to the impact of higher temperatures on the cars cooling systems and tyre management. Button predicted a completely different to that in Australia because he believed the increase in tyre degradation would result in a wholly different style of driving in the hotter temperatures experienced in Malaysia. He said it would be "difficult to say" whether McLaren would be closer to Red Bull even with upgrades to fine-tune the car configuration. Vettel spoke of his confidence that the forecasted higher temperatures would not negatively affect Red Bull, who were unconcerned, "This is a completely different track with different characteristics and different demands on the tyres and the cars." Renault team principal Éric Boullier said that while the team may have been third-fastest in Melbourne, the order in Sepang would be different, "for the race after that there will be another new order, so it’s not representative for the whole season, no."

The high temperatures in Malaysia and the abrasive surface of the Sepang circuit led to tyre supplier Pirelli making predictions of high wear rates throughout qualifying and the race to the extent that pit stop strategy would be the deciding factor in the outcome. Pirelli also supplied an experimental harder compound of rubber for use during free practice with a view to introducing the tyre for the Turkish Grand Prix, but rejected it following feedback from the teams. Each driver received two additional sets of tyres for the Friday free practice sessions for evaluation reasons and after that competitors were left with the normal six sets of tyres for use in both qualifying and the race.

A total of 12 constructors and 24 drivers participated with no driver changes from the preceding Australian Grand Prix and three free practice entrants partaking only in the first practice session. Reserve driver Nico Hülkenberg once again substituted for Paul di Resta at Force India, whilst Daniel Ricciardo drove in the place of Sébastien Buemi at Toro Rosso, having previously driven in the place of Jaime Alguersuari in Melbourne. 2009–10 GP2 Asia Series champion Davide Valsecchi participated in his first Formula One race weekend, driving Heikki Kovalainen's Lotus. Red Bull had two front wing specifications available but Vettel and his teammate Webber chose the inset version featuring a simplified endplate specification; the team used the KERS power boost for the first time because of the additional speed the system provided in Sepang. Ferrari slightly altered the front wing on the 150º Italia, adding a small flap between the turning vanes and modifying the endplates. Renault introduced a new front wing featuring an updated endplate to the R31 car. McLaren tested a carbon fibre diffuser during practice before reverting to the titanium specification used in Australia. Michael Schumacher and Nico Rosberg swapped Mercedes MGP W02 chassis for the race in Malaysia while Lotus tested its new front wing configuration during Friday free practice. After failing to qualify in Melbourne when they were forced to use the front wing from their 2010 car, Hispania Racing arrived at the circuit confident of being able to qualify for the race because their 2011 specification front wing satisfactorily completed its mandatory crash tests.

== Practice ==
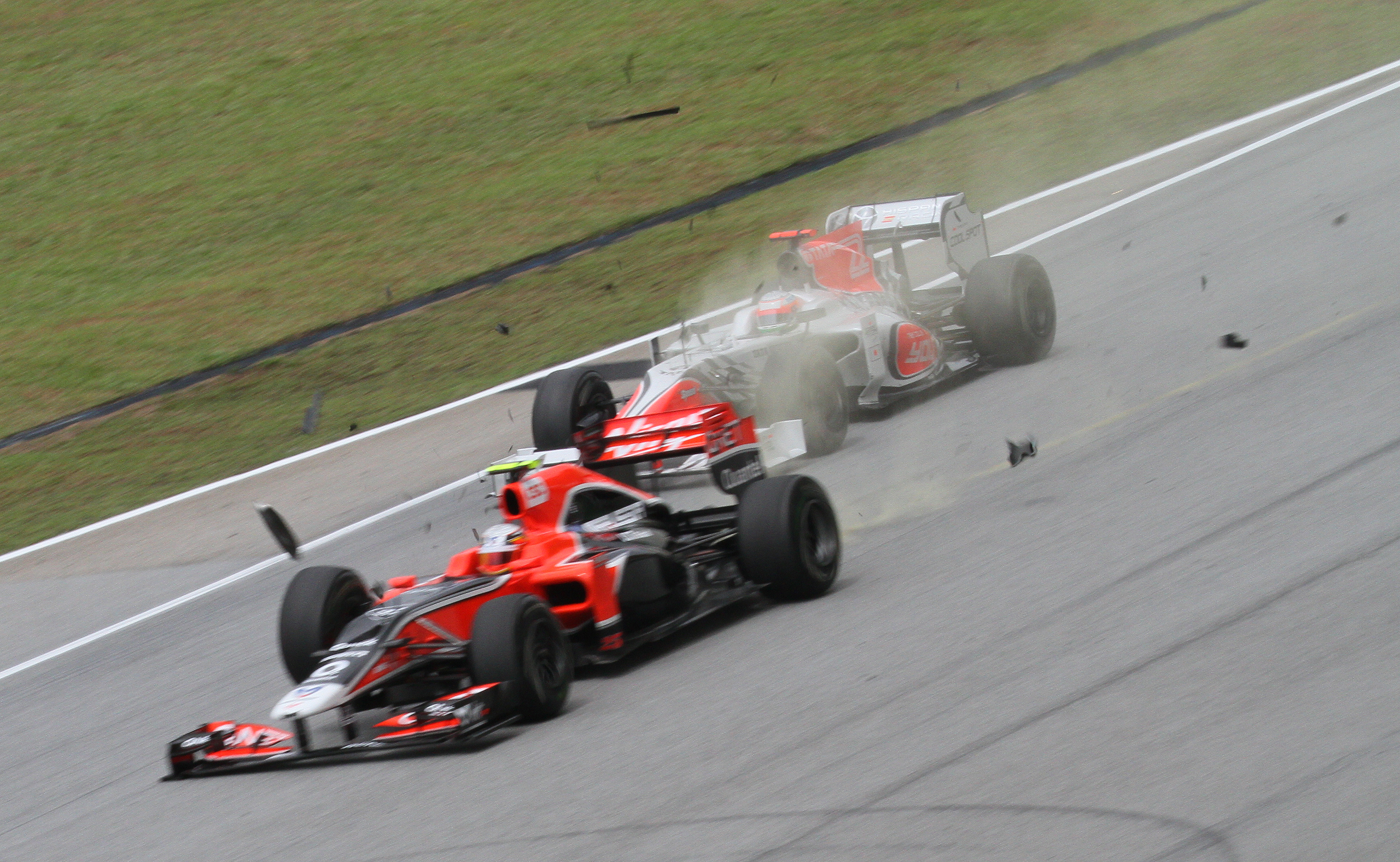
Jérôme d'Ambrosio suffered a catastrophic suspension failure during the first free practice session

Per the regulations for the 2011 season, three practice sessions were held: two 90-minute sessions on Friday and another 60-minute session on Saturday. Overall lap times were considerably slower at the circuit than in 2010, with Webber's fastest time over two and a half seconds slower than Hamilton's time in the same session a year previously.

The first practice session on Friday morning was run in humid but dry conditions, despite forecasts of heavy rain. With a time of 1:37.651, Webber was the fastest driver in the first session, 1.665 seconds faster than Hamilton. Schumacher. Hülkenberg, Williams's Pastor Maldonado, Ferrari's Felipe Massa, Renault's Nick Heidfeld, Maldonado's teammate Rubens Barrichello, Alonso and Rosberg completed the top ten. Multiple drivers made errors on the slippery track filled with a large amount discarded tyre rubber off the racing line during the session. Just after passing an Hispania car, Virgin driver Jérôme d'Ambrosio suffered a front-right suspension failure under braking for the final turn, shearing off his front-right wheel. D'Ambrosio careened into the gravel trap and stopped just before the wall. The Renaults suffered suspension upright faults due to an material batch issue. Heidfeld had the front right tyre seized and then puncture that caused the Renault to bottom out and damage its floor under braking entering turn one while his teammate Petrov spun off into the turn nine gravel trap when his front-left upright failed. On his third lap, Narain Karthikeyan stopped after turn four with smoke billowing from his Hispania car's rear due to an oil system issue.

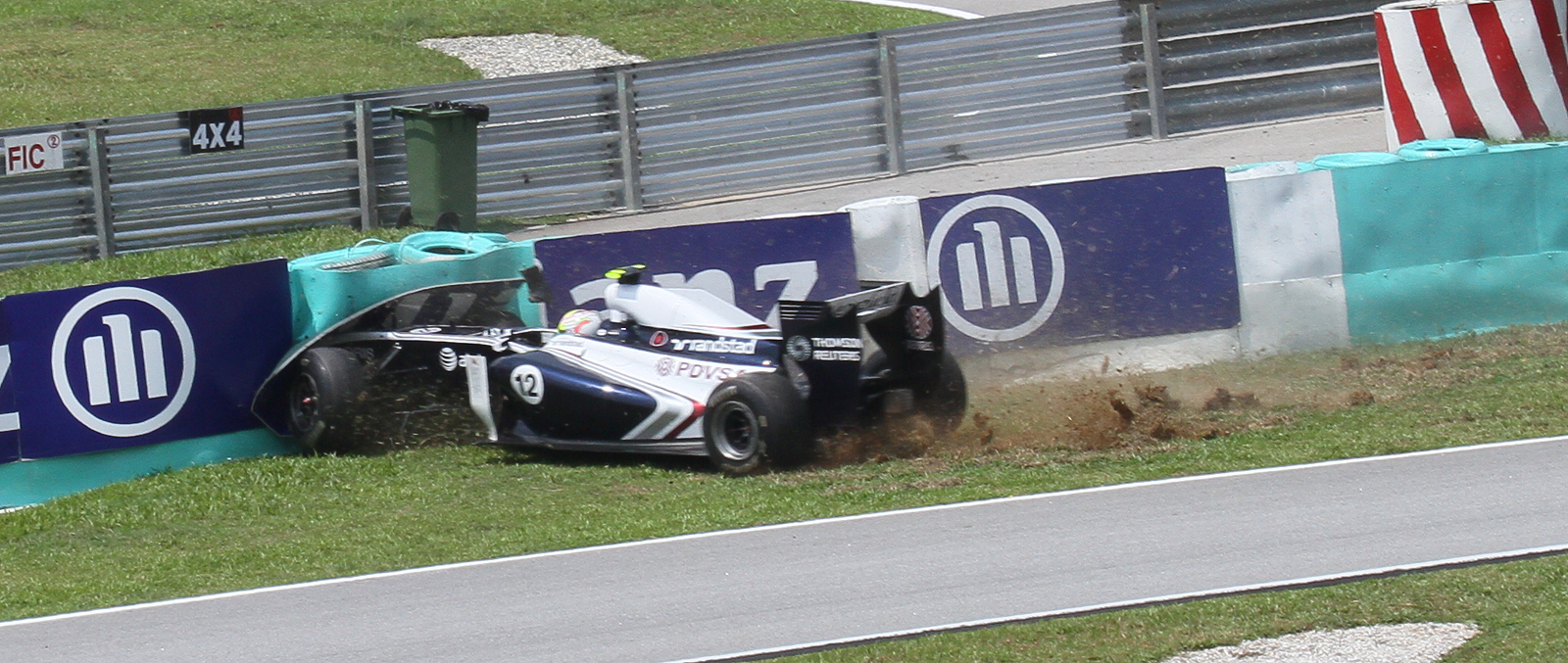
Pastor Maldonado ran wide at the pit entry and hit the wall during second practice.

Later in the afternoon during the second practice session, which took place in hot weather conditions, Webber set the day's fastest lap time of 1:36.876 just after midway through the session, which was 0.005 seconds faster than Button. Hamilton, Vettel, Schumacher, Massa, Rosberg, Heidfeld, Alonso and Alguersuari rounded out the top ten. Maldonado put his two right-hand side wheels onto the grass while entering the pit lane. He spun 360 degrees and struck the outside tyre barrier. Maldonado's car was not heavily damaged and returned to the circuit just before the session concluded. Vitantonio Liuzzi ran wide over the turn six kerbing and then had a engine switch problem that forced him to stop on the turn nine inside. Force India driver Adrian Sutil and Rosberg lost rear end grip and ran off the track.

In the final practice session, Hamilton set the fastest lap time of 1:36.340 in the closing four minutes. Webber, Button, Heidfeld, Vettel, Alonso, Petrov, Massa, Sauber's Kamui Kobayashi and Schumacher followed in positions two through ten. Paul di Resta drove an ill-handling Force India and spun at turn 15 and then at turn 14. Liuzzi was in the pit lane for half of the session due to a water leak while Vettel's DRS was not working properly and the onboard television camera came off his car.

== Qualifying ==
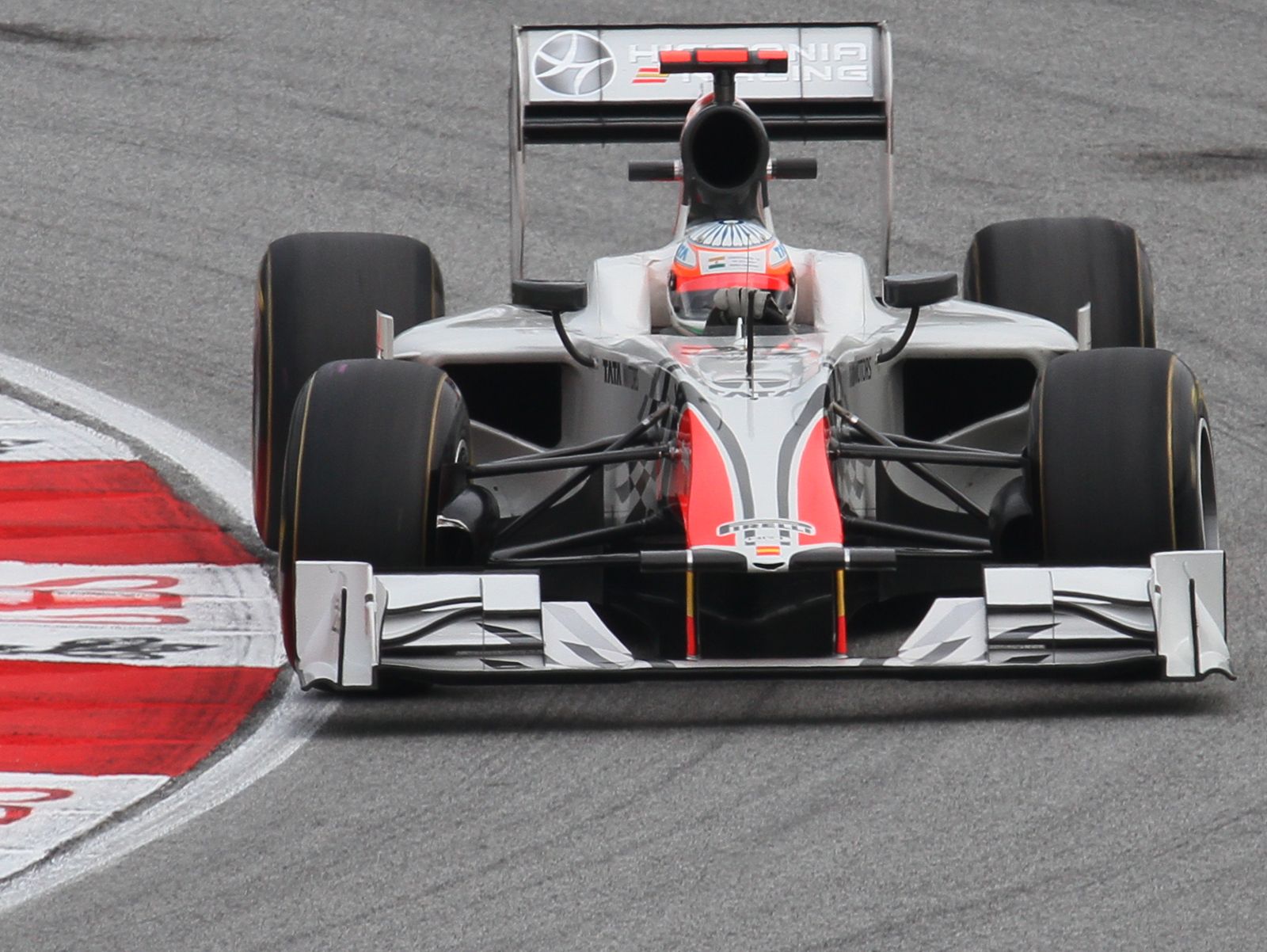
Narain Karthikeyan completed the first full grid of the year but both HRT cars failed to finish the race

The qualifying session on Saturday afternoon was split into three parts. The first part ran for 20 minutes and eliminated the cars from qualifying that finished the session 18th or lower. During this session, the 107% rule was in effect, which necessitated each driver set a time within 107% of the quickest lap to qualify for the race. The second part of qualifying lasted 15 minutes and eliminated cars that finished in positions 11 to 17. The final part of qualifying determined the positions from first to tenth, and decided pole position. Qualifying took place in dry weather conditions. Vettel claimed the 17th pole position of his career with a lap time of 1:34.870 that he began with four seconds remaining. Hamilton was the initial pace setter of the third segment and was able to go faster until Vettel's fastest lap, dropping him to second and stopping him from claiming his first pole position since the 2010 Canadian Grand Prix. He said he lost 0.15 seconds at turn 14. Webber took third, 0.309 seconds slower than his teammate, after he ran wide at the final turn. Button overheated his tyres in the first sector on his last run and that gave him excess oversteer in the last sector en route to securing fourth. Ferrari had just one set of soft compound tyres to use in the final segment after using two sets to make it to the final session. Alonso was fifth with Massa seventh. Heidfeld separated the two Ferraris in sixth; he lost time pushing hard in the second segment. Petrov was the slower Renault driver in eighth. Rosberg had a good car balance up to the final session combined with a rear wing issue and took ninth. Kobayashi qualified for the final session with a late improvement in the preceding segment on his final set of unused soft compound tyres.

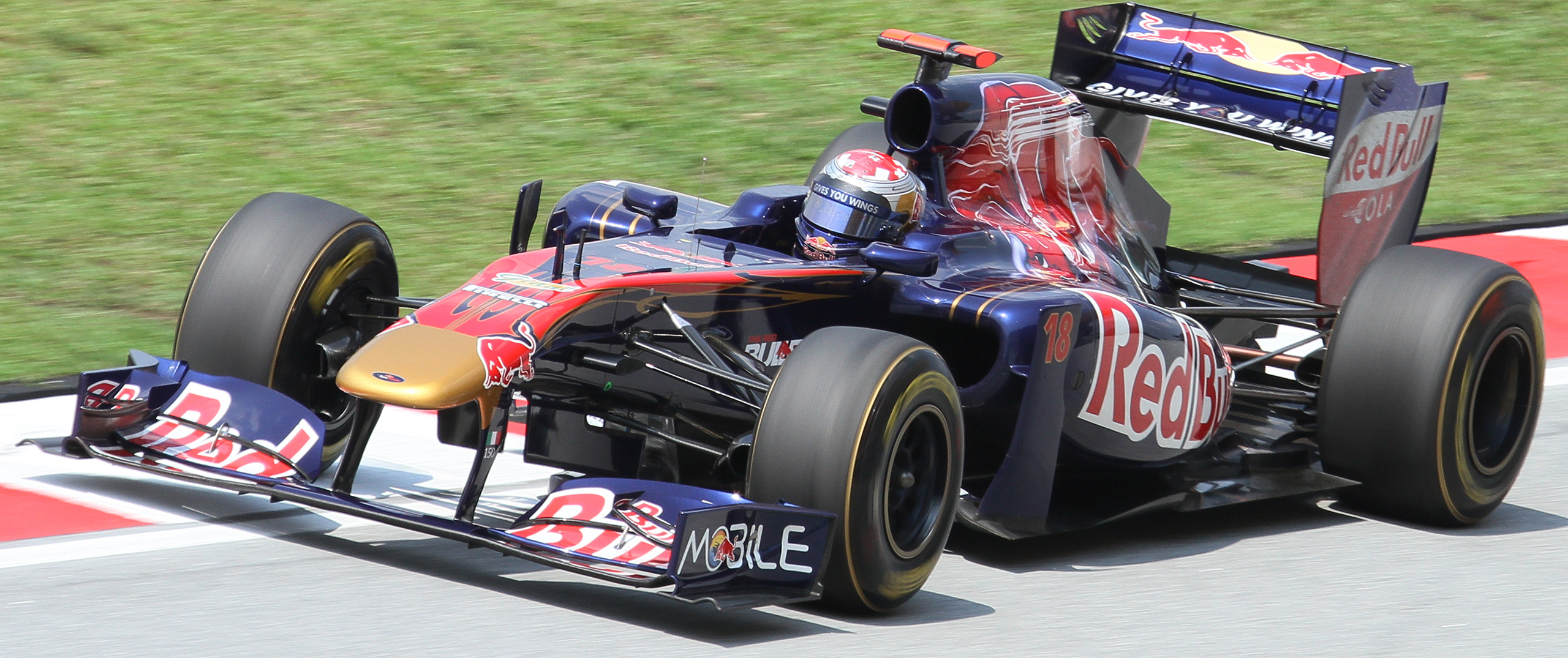
Sébastien Buemi's Toro Rosso shed part of its lef-thand sidepod during the first qualifying session.

Schumacher equalled his Australian Grand Prix qualifying result of 11th, and failed to advance to the final session for the second consecutive race after his teammate Rosberg's late improvement at the conclusion of the second segment. This was due to problems with the Mercedes's DRS rear wing activation on his last run as the flow did not reattach correctly after DRS was deployed. Sébastien Buemi's Toro Rosso car shed part of the left-hand sidepod exiting turn eight. There was no internal damage to the car, and Buemi was able to return to the pits with the internal workings of the car showing. The first session was stopped for several minutes by FIA race director Charlie Whiting while marshalls retrieved the bodywork. Buemi's car was inspected by the FIA and cleared to return to the circuit, though the exact cause of the problem remained unknown. Buemi qualified 12th, ahead of his teammate Alguersuari in 13th. Di Resta was the faster of the two Force India drivers for the second successive race and took 14th. Williams's Rubens Barrichello was the final driver to qualify for the second session and was 15th, finding his car not gaining him with DRS or a low fuel load. Sergio Pérez was baulked by slower cars on his out lap and qualified his Sauber car 16th due to a lack of front grip creating excess understeer in the final sector. Sutil, 17th, could not improve because of a gearbox mis-shift. Maldonado failed to advance to the second session when he ran wide at the final turn and was 18th. The Lotus pair of Kovalainen and Jarno Trulli came within a threat of going through to the second segment but failed to do so and qualified 19th and 20th. Virgin's Timo Glock caught Karthikeyan on his second set of tyres and took 21st, ahead of his teammate D'Ambrosio in 22nd. Hispania lapped inside the 107% margin and qualified for the first race of the season, thus ensuring all 24 entrants qualified for the event. Liuzzi was ahead of his teammate Karthikeyan, who flat-spotted his second set of tyres at the first corner.

=== Post-qualifying ===
After qualifying, Whiting approved a request from the drivers to move the pole position slot from the left- to the right-hand side of the circuit. The pole slot had traditionally been on the left-hand side of the circuit because it offered the optimal racing line into the tight first corner, but was moved because of the build-up of rubber from the Pirelli tyres off the racing line, which runs over the right-hand side of the circuit.

=== Qualifying classification ===
The fastest lap in each of the three sessions is denoted in bold.

Pos	No	Driver	Constructor	Part 1	Part 2	Part 3	Grid
1	1	(Germany) Sebastian Vettel	Red Bull Racing-Renault	1:37.468	1:35.934	**1:34.870**	1
2	3	(United Kingdom) Lewis Hamilton	McLaren-Mercedes	1:36.861	1:35.852	1:34.974	2
3	2	(Australia) Mark Webber	Red Bull Racing-Renault	1:37.924	1:36.080	1:35.179	3
4	4	(United Kingdom) Jenson Button	McLaren-Mercedes	1:37.033	**1:35.569**	1:35.200	4
5	5	(Spain) Fernando Alonso	Ferrari	1:36.897	1:36.320	1:35.802	5
6	9	(Germany) Nick Heidfeld	Renault	1:37.224	1:36.811	1:36.124	6
7	6	(Brazil) Felipe Massa	Ferrari	**1:36.744**	1:36.557	1:36.251	7
8	10	(Russia) Vitaly Petrov	Renault	1:37.210	1:36.642	1:36.324	8
9	8	(Germany) Nico Rosberg	Mercedes	1:37.316	1:36.388	1:36.809	9
10	16	(Japan) Kamui Kobayashi	Sauber-Ferrari	1:36.994	1:36.691	1:36.820	10
11	7	(Germany) Michael Schumacher	Mercedes	1:36.904	1:37.035		11
12	18	(Switzerland) Sébastien Buemi	Toro Rosso-Ferrari	1:37.693	1:37.160		12
13	19	(Spain) Jaime Alguersuari	Toro Rosso-Ferrari	1:37.677	1:37.347		13
14	15	(United Kingdom) Paul di Resta	Force India-Mercedes	1:38.045	1:37.370		14
15	11	(Brazil) Rubens Barrichello	Williams-Cosworth	1:38.163	1:37.496		15
16	17	(Mexico) Sergio Pérez	Sauber-Ferrari	1:37.759	1:37.528		16
17	14	(Germany) Adrian Sutil	Force India-Mercedes	1:37.693	1:37.593		17
18	12	(Venezuela) Pastor Maldonado	Williams-Cosworth	1:38.276			18
19	20	(Finland) Heikki Kovalainen	Lotus-Renault	1:38.645			19
20	21	(Italy) Jarno Trulli	Lotus-Renault	1:38.791			20
21	24	(Germany) Timo Glock	Virgin-Cosworth	1:40.648			21
22	25	(Belgium) Jérôme d'Ambrosio	Virgin-Cosworth	1:41.001			22
23	23	(Italy) Vitantonio Liuzzi	HRT-Cosworth	1:41.549			23
24	22	(India) Narain Karthikeyan	HRT-Cosworth	1:42.574			24
107% time: 1:43.516

== Race ==
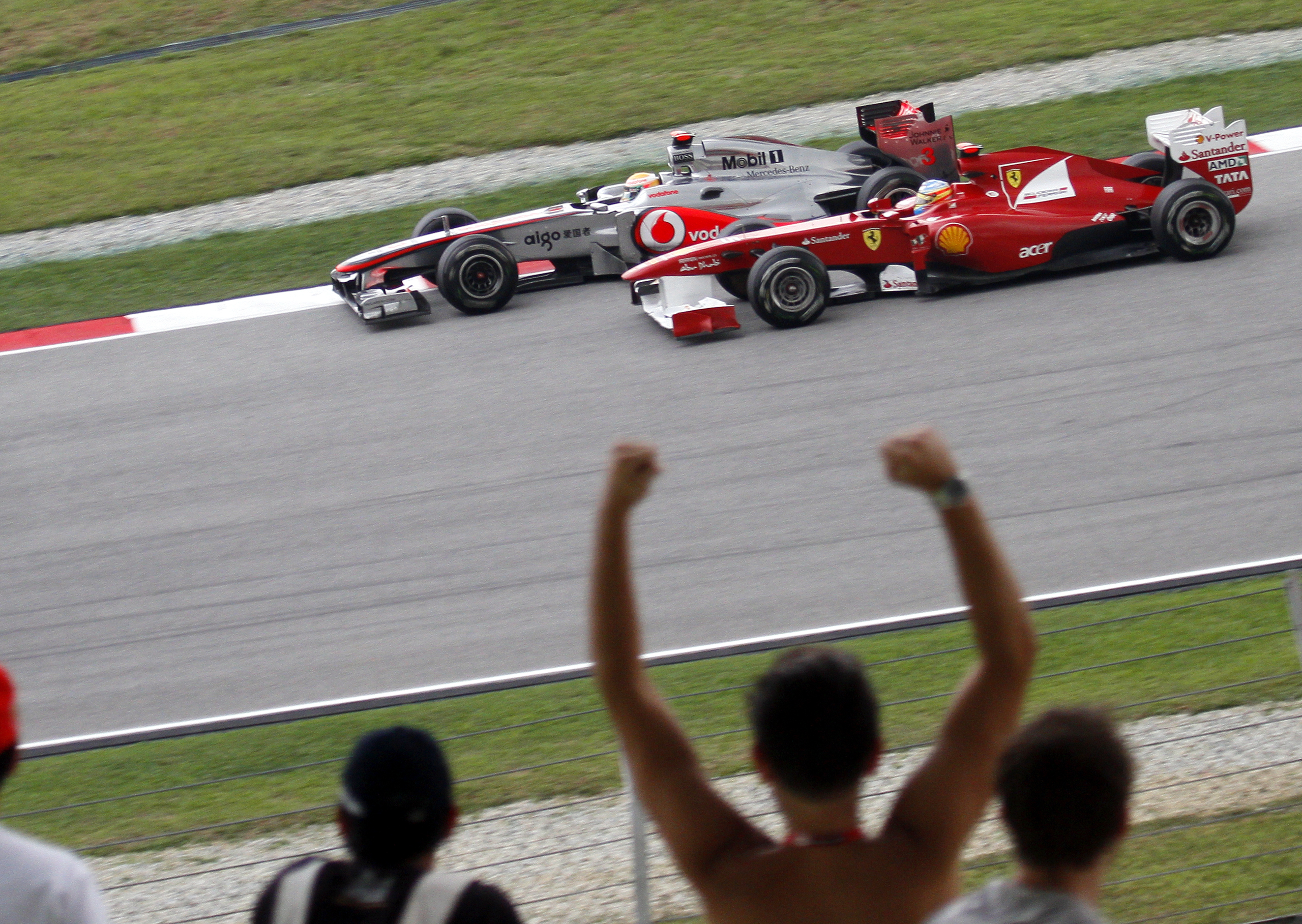
Lewis Hamilton and Fernando Alonso battle during the race.

A total of 65,000 spectators attended the race, which commenced at 16:00 local time. The weather conditions were cloudy, hot and humid before the race and there was the chance of rain; the air temperature was 28 °C (82 °F) and the track temperature was between 29 and 32 °C (84 and 90 °F). Every driver began on the soft compound tyre. In what would be a dominant race for the 2010 World Champion, Vettel made a clean break from the lights and quickly began developing a strong lead from the rest of the pack. The other big winner was Heidfeld, who was able to move from sixth to second at the start. By lap 9 Vettel had built a 5.2 second lead over his fellow German, and was able to comfortably bring his car home in first in spite of KERS problems that plagued the second half of his race. while Maldonado retired with a misfire. Barrichello was the next retirement with a gearbox problem, which they later traced to the hydraulics. On lap 24, the Sauber of Pérez was struck by a piece of debris, possibly from an unidentified car. The debris damaged the front wing and floor of the Sauber before passing through both the chassis and the protective Zylon panel, and hitting the ECU. The ECU was rendered inactive, stopping the car. The debris then passed out of the car by smashing through the sidepod. Trulli slid across the gravel before retiring with a clutch failure on lap 31.

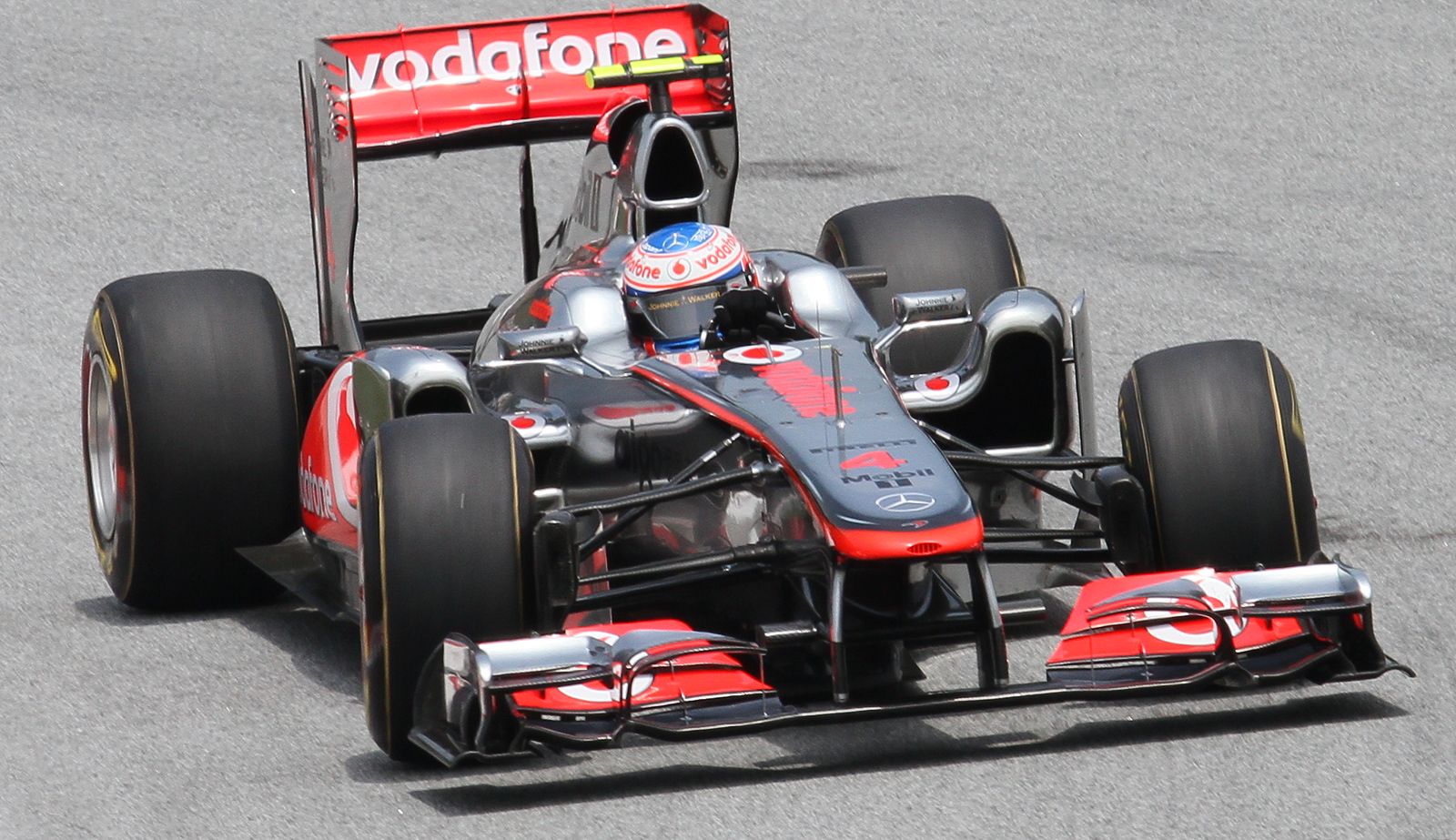
Jenson Button finished in second position, for his first podium of the year

The Hispanias of Karthikeyan and Liuzzi were withdrawn by the team for "safety reasons". Karthikeyan experienced an abnormal spike in water temperature on lap 15, whilst Liuzzi's car was subject to vibrations from the rear wing. Although neither fault was terminal, the team elected to retire the cars rather than risk further damage.

Behind Vettel, the McLarens of Hamilton and Button fought with Alonso for position, Button coming out on top and ultimately taking his first podium of the season, ahead of Heidfeld who finished third, whilst both Hamilton and Alonso were penalised for their actions on track. Further back, D'Ambrosio pulled off the track with an electronics failure, and later Petrov crashed out from eighth place.

=== Race classification ===
Pos	No	Driver	Constructor	Laps	Time/Retired	Grid	Points
1	1	(Germany) Sebastian Vettel	Red Bull Racing-Renault	56	1:37:39.832	1	25
2	4	(United Kingdom) Jenson Button	McLaren-Mercedes	56	+3.261	4	18
3	9	(Germany) Nick Heidfeld	Renault	56	+25.075	6	15
4	2	(Australia) Mark Webber	Red Bull Racing-Renault	56	+26.384	3	12
5	6	(Brazil) Felipe Massa	Ferrari	56	+36.958	7	10
6	5	(Spain) Fernando Alonso	Ferrari	56	+57.248^{1}	5	8
7	16	(Japan) Kamui Kobayashi	Sauber-Ferrari	56	+1:06.439	10	6
8	3	(United Kingdom) Lewis Hamilton	McLaren-Mercedes	56	+1:09.957^{2}	2	4
9	7	(Germany) Michael Schumacher	Mercedes	56	+1:24.896	11	2
10	15	(United Kingdom) Paul di Resta	Force India-Mercedes	56	+1:31.563	14	1
11	14	(Germany) Adrian Sutil	Force India-Mercedes	56	+1:41.379	17	
12	8	(Germany) Nico Rosberg	Mercedes	55	+1 Lap	9	
13	18	(Switzerland) Sébastien Buemi	Toro Rosso-Ferrari	55	+1 Lap	12	
14	19	(Spain) Jaime Alguersuari	Toro Rosso-Ferrari	55	+1 Lap	13	
15	20	(Finland) Heikki Kovalainen	Lotus-Renault	55	+1 Lap	19	
16	24	(Germany) Timo Glock	Virgin-Cosworth	54	+2 Laps	21	
17	10	(Russia) Vitaly Petrov	Renault	52	Accident^{3}	8	
Ret	23	(Italy) Vitantonio Liuzzi	HRT-Cosworth	46	Rear wing	23	
Ret	25	(Belgium) Jérôme d'Ambrosio	Virgin-Cosworth	42	Electrical	22	
Ret	21	(Italy) Jarno Trulli	Lotus-Renault	31	Clutch	20	
Ret	17	(Mexico) Sergio Pérez	Sauber-Ferrari	23	Electrical	16	
Ret	11	(Brazil) Rubens Barrichello	Williams-Cosworth	22	Hydraulics	15	
Ret	22	(India) Narain Karthikeyan	HRT-Cosworth	14	Mechanical	24	
Ret	12	(Venezuela) Pastor Maldonado	Williams-Cosworth	8	Engine	18	

Notes

- ^1 – Fernando Alonso was penalised 20 seconds post-race for contact while trying to pass Lewis Hamilton.
- ^2 – Lewis Hamilton originally finished seventh but was also penalised 20 seconds post-race, for weaving while being passed by Fernando Alonso.
- ^3 – Vitaly Petrov crashed his Renault on lap 53 of the race, but was classified as he had completed 90% of the race-winner's distance.

== Championship standings after the race ==
Drivers' Championship standings

	Pos.	Driver	Points
	1	(Germany) Sebastian Vettel	50
4	2	(United Kingdom) Jenson Button	26
1	3	(United Kingdom) Lewis Hamilton	22
1	4	(Australia) Mark Webber	22
1	5	(Spain) Fernando Alonso	20

Constructors' Championship standings

	Pos.	Constructor	Points
	1	(Austria) Red Bull Racing-Renault	72
	2	(United Kingdom) McLaren-Mercedes	48
	3	(Italy) Ferrari	36
	4	(United Kingdom) Renault	30
6	5	(Switzerland) Sauber-Ferrari	6

- Note: Only the top five positions are included for both sets of standings.

Previous race: 2011 Australian Grand Prix	FIA Formula One World Championship; 2011 season	Next race: 2011 Chinese Grand Prix
Previous race: 2010 Malaysian Grand Prix	Malaysian Grand Prix	Next race: 2012 Malaysian Grand Prix
