= Gary Gannon (engineer) =

American engineer

- Education: Cornell University
- Occupation: Engineer
- Employer: Aston Martin F1 Team
- Title: Senior race engineer

Gary Gannon is an American Formula One engineer. He is currently the senior race engineer to Lance Stroll at the Aston Martin F1 Team.

== Career ==
Gannon studied mechanical engineering at Cornell University. He began his motorsport career with Honda Racing Corporation USA, working on programmes in CART and the American Le Mans Series. He later relocated to the United Kingdom to join Wirth Research, contributing to its Formula One project with the newly formed Virgin Racing team. He moved to the team itself in 2011, initially working in trackside aerodynamics before becoming a Performance Engineer in 2012 when the operation was rebranded as the Marussia F1 Team. He became Race Engineer to Max Chilton from 2013 to 2014, overseeing the Briton during his two seasons in the sport.

He joined the Haas F1 Team ahead of its entry into Formula One in 2016, becoming Race Engineer to Romain Grosjean and playing a key role in establishing the team's trackside engineering structure during its formative years. Gannon continued as Grosjean's engineer through 2018 before moving to the other side of the garage to work with Kevin Magnussen from 2018 to 2020, guiding the Dane during Haas's most competitive period in the midfield. From 2021 to 2022 he engineered Mick Schumacher, supporting the German through his two seasons in the sport. He then partnered Nico Hülkenberg for the 2023 and 2024 seasons following the German's return to Formula One. In 2025 Gannon moved to the Aston Martin F1 Team as Race Engineer to Lance Stroll. He was promoted to Senior Race Engineer in 2026, continuing to work with Stroll while taking on increased responsibility for engineering coordination and performance direction within the race team.
