= Virgin VR-01 =

2010 Formula One motor racing car

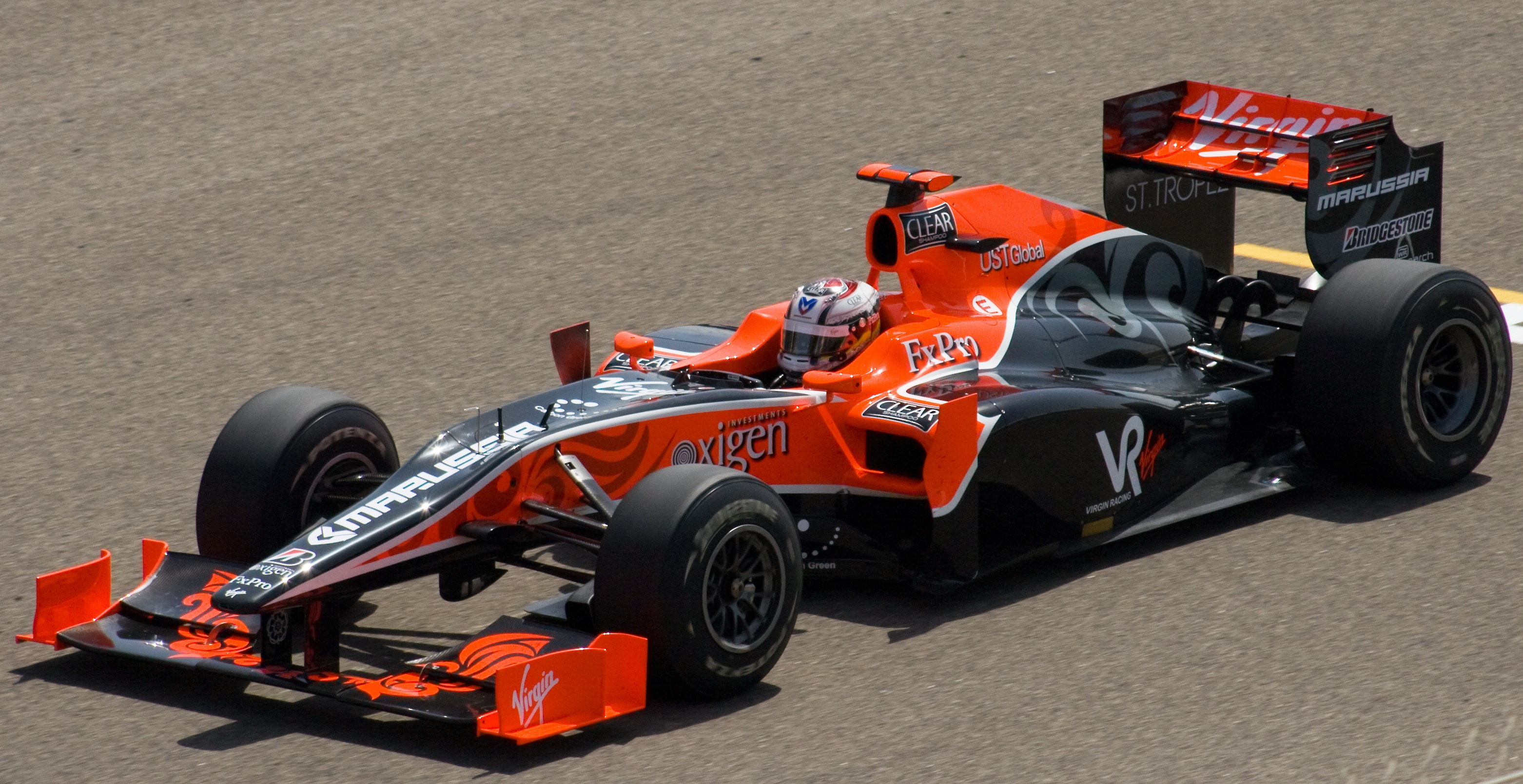
- Timo Glock driving the VR-01 at the Bahrain Grand Prix
- Category: Formula One
- Constructor: Virgin Racing
- Designers: Nick Wirth (Technical Director); John McQuilliam (Chief Designer); Richard Taylor (Head of Aerodynamics)
- Successor: Virgin MVR-02

Technical specifications
- Chassis: carbon-fibre construction monocoque and nosebox
- Suspension (front): carbon-fibre wishbones with titanium flexure joints, aluminium alloy uprights, Penske dampers
- Suspension (rear): as front
- Engine: Cosworth CA2010 2,400 cc (146.5 cu in) 90° V8, limited to 18,000 RPM naturally aspirated mid-mounted
- Transmission: Seven-speed semi-automatic gearbox with reverse gear Aluminium construction, "seamless shift" electronically controlled hydraulic differential
- Weight: 620 kg (1,367 lb) (including driver)
- Fuel: BP
- Tyres: Bridgestone; BBS Wheels (front and rear): 13"

Competition history
- Notable entrants: Virgin Racing
- Notable drivers: 24. (Germany) Timo Glock; 25. (Brazil) Lucas di Grassi
- Debut: 2010 Bahrain Grand Prix
- Last event: 2010 Abu Dhabi Grand Prix
Races	Wins	Podiums	Poles	F/Laps
19	0	0	0	0

The Virgin VR-01 was a Formula One motor racing car designed by Nick Wirth for Virgin Racing in the 2010 season. It was driven by former Toyota driver Timo Glock and Brazilian ex-GP2 driver Lucas di Grassi. The car was the first Formula One racing car designed entirely with computational fluid dynamics. The car was due to be launched online through the official team website on 3 February 2010, but technical issues prevented the live internet broadcast from taking place.

== Virgin Racing formation ==
In February 2009, Richard Branson's Virgin organisation was reported as bidding to buy the former Honda Formula One team. Branson later stated an interest in Formula One, but claimed Formula One needed to develop a more economically efficient and environmentally responsible image. Virgin later sponsored the new Brawn GP for 2009.

The team was formed as Manor Grand Prix as a tie-up between Manor Motorsport and Wirth Research, with Graeme Lowdon as CEO, Manor Motorsport boss John Booth as team principal and former Simtek team owner Nick Wirth as technical director. John Booth said: "I was introduced to Nick back in March 09 when the budget cap concept was introduced, There was going to be 30m pounds TV money, that was going to be the cost of the season and it all sounded like a great idea."

The team was meeting prospective sponsors for 2010 at Silverstone at the 2009 British Grand Prix weekend on the very day that F1 threatened to implode amid commercial acrimony and the threat of breakaway championships. Against that landscape the new teams were very much needed as an insurance policy by F1's power brokers. But, once it was obvious that a breakaway was no more likely than at any other time during the previous 30 years, that was not quite so true. There would be no performance breaks for the newcomers, as promised, and the question was whether or not to continue. They ultimately decided to continue but within the financial framework, they had decided on for the old regulations - and could only do that because of Nick Wirth's CFD capability.

With Mercedes-Benz purchasing Brawn at the end of the season, Branson invested in an 80% buyout of Manor Grand Prix, with the team being renamed Virgin Racing.

Virgin Racing were based on a three-way partnership between Manor Motorsport, which ran the cars; Wirth Research, which designed them, and Virgin which handled all the commercials. Car preparation and racing operations were run from its headquarters in Dinnington, South Yorkshire; Wirth Research designed, developed, and built the VR-01 from its base in Bicester, before announcing a relocation to new, larger premises in Banbury, Oxfordshire in July 2010.

Virgin Racing had the lowest operating budget of all the teams in 2010 of £40m. Branson said, "Money's not everything. They are determined to prove that via engineering prowess, great drivers, and a great affinity with the public they can do well."

== Drivers ==
On 17 November 2009 it was announced by the team that former Toyota driver Timo Glock would be the team's lead driver for the 2010 season. It seemed as though Glock would partner Polish driver Robert Kubica at Renault, but following Renault's decision to announce whether it would take part in Formula 1 for 2010, Glock chose an option where he would be guaranteed a drive although the car might be less competitive. Glock was signed for two years and had a one-year extension offer as well. Long-time Brazilian GP2 regular Lucas di Grassi joined him. It was reported by The Daily Telegraph that di Grassi had also provided Virgin with £5 million worth of sponsorship. An important factor in his decision was the chance to work with John Booth, the Virgin team principal.

== Development ==
Technical director Nick Wirth took the decision to use only the computer simulation tool CFD to develop the aerodynamics, with no reference to a wind tunnel. John Booth said, "My prediction is that wind tunnels will be a thing of the past and by the time Malaysia1 (Lotus Racing) get theirs built, they will be redundant. When you look at the pace of development, particularly in the front wing area, there's no way that can be done in a wind tunnel -- there are not enough hours in the day. People will start splitting the resource much more towards CFD." Later upgrades to the VR-01 seemed to vindicate that decision.

Like all the new teams Virgin suffered problems with hydraulics, John Booth commented, "Everything connected with the hydraulics was such high pressure that the smallest impurity, crack or fault was a car stopper because it controls four or five major components,"

It had been reported by Auto, Motor und Sport that the VR-01's fuel tank was too small for the car to finish a race, and that the team applied to the Fédération Internationale de l'Automobile (FIA) in order to obtain permission to modify the chassis to accommodate a larger tank. The revised chassis, with a longer underbody, engine cover and other bodywork changes, was expected to be introduced at the Spanish Grand Prix. This was later clarified to mean that the car would struggle to complete races with a heavy rate of fuel consumption.

== Preseason ==
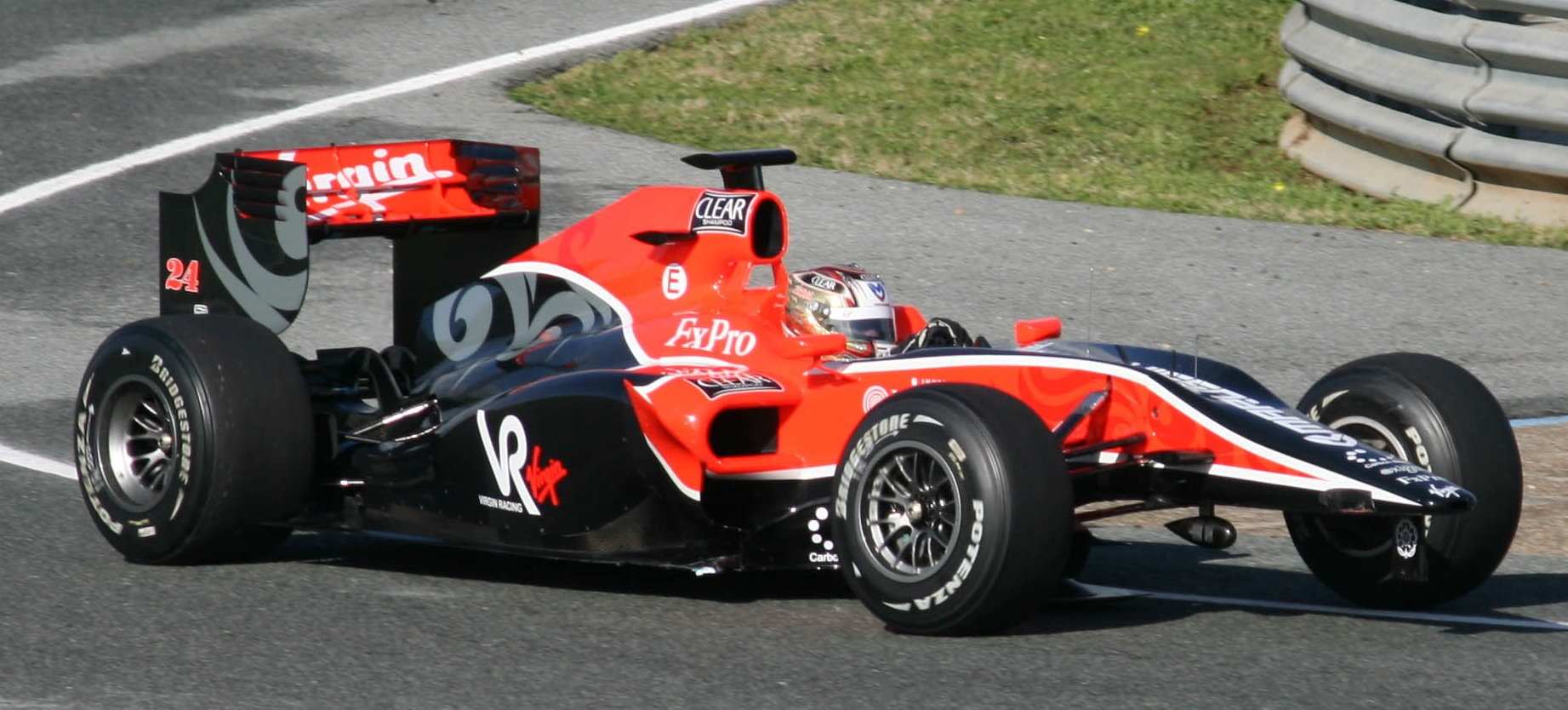
Glock driving the VR-01, minus its front wing, during pre-season testing at Circuito de Jerez in February 2010.

The car passed its mandatory FIA crash tests, and completed its first track run at Silverstone on February 4 in the hands of Glock. It tested with other teams for the first time at the group test at Jerez from February 10 to 13. On the first day, Glock completed five laps of the track during wet weather conditions. On the second day, he completed eleven laps before the car's front wing failed; the team had to abandon the day's running due to a shortage of spare parts. Virgin modified the front wing mounting of the VR-01 ahead of the third day's running in Jerez, where di Grassi ran the Virgin for the first time. The following test was plagued by weather conditions and the car suffered a hydraulic problem on the first test day and Glock only managed 10 laps. On the next day Glock notched up 72 laps for the car and had no mechanical problems, however the weather was still wet. Di Grassi took over for the remaining two days of the test. Technical director Wirth said that the hydraulic problem was solved and the car has not had any big glitches. The problem recurred, however, at the final pre-season testing session held at Catalunya, costing the team further track time and necessitating a further redesign of the relevant components ahead of the Bahrain Grand Prix.

== Season summary ==
At the Bahrain Grand Prix first practice, di Grassi was plagued by mechanical issues, di Grassi could only manage a couple of installation laps whilst Glock was able to coax his car to a 2:03.680. In the Bahrain Grand Prix final practice, Twenty-two minutes into the final practice session at the Sakhir circuit, the nut on Timo Glock's front-left tyre worked loose. The tyre itself rolled off and along the track before hitting a barrier and coming to rest. Glock had moments earlier become the first of the newcomers to dip under the two-minute mark for the 6.299 km track, clocking a time of 1min 59.245sec. Glock was able to tour back to the garage for the remainder of the lap on three wheels, with the team discovering the problem being an under-torqued airgun. In Qualifying, by some margin, di Grassi was able to head the two Hispanias by just under three seconds, managing a 2:00.587 and two tenths behind Lotus’ Heikki Kovalainen, who qualified 21st. Glock was able to stretch his legs thanks to greater familiarity with the Virgin car, and took a well-worked 19th, pipping Jarno Trulli in the other Lotus to be the highest placed driver of the new teams. In the race, Both cars got off the line, but on Lap 3, Di Grassi suffered a hydraulic failure, similar to pre-season testing, and pulled off to the side. The Brazilian driver was not too disheartened however, and was adamant that “the car was feeling good”. Timo Glock also retired on lap 17 after losing third and fifth gears. Heikki Kovalainen finished fifteenth in the second Lotus, meaning that Lotus became the only entrant of the new teams to have a car finish the race.

For the Australian Grand Prix Virgin Racing was granted permission from Formula One's governing body the Fédération Internationale de l'Automobile (FIA) to change the size of their car's fuel tanks because their capacity was not large enough for their drivers to complete a Grand Prix at full speed; the chassis would not be ready until the Spanish Grand Prix on 9 May. The Lotus T127 was definitely ahead of the VR-01 in terms of both pace and reliability, whilst the Dallara-designed Hispania F110 was a little behind Lotus and Virgin. Glock and Di Grassi qualified 21st and 22nd respectively, but nominated to start their drivers from pit lane after replacing the fuel collectors on their cars after issues in qualifying forced them to run with more fuel than would be ideal. Both cars managed to avoid the spun Alonso on the first lap. On lap 5, Schumacher attempted to pass di Grassi for 19th position but di Grassi managed to retake the position from Schumacher by driving around the outside of Ascari corner, but Schumacher got ahead of di Grassi on the pit straight. di Grassi drove to his garage to retire with an issue with his car's hydraulics on lap 29, while on the 45th lap, Glock made a pit stop and his mechanics retired him from the race because a camber shim on his car was loose and it caused the left rear suspension to move around. Virgin had yet to finish a race, while HRT scooped up a 14th, which would become costly for Virgin at the end of the season.

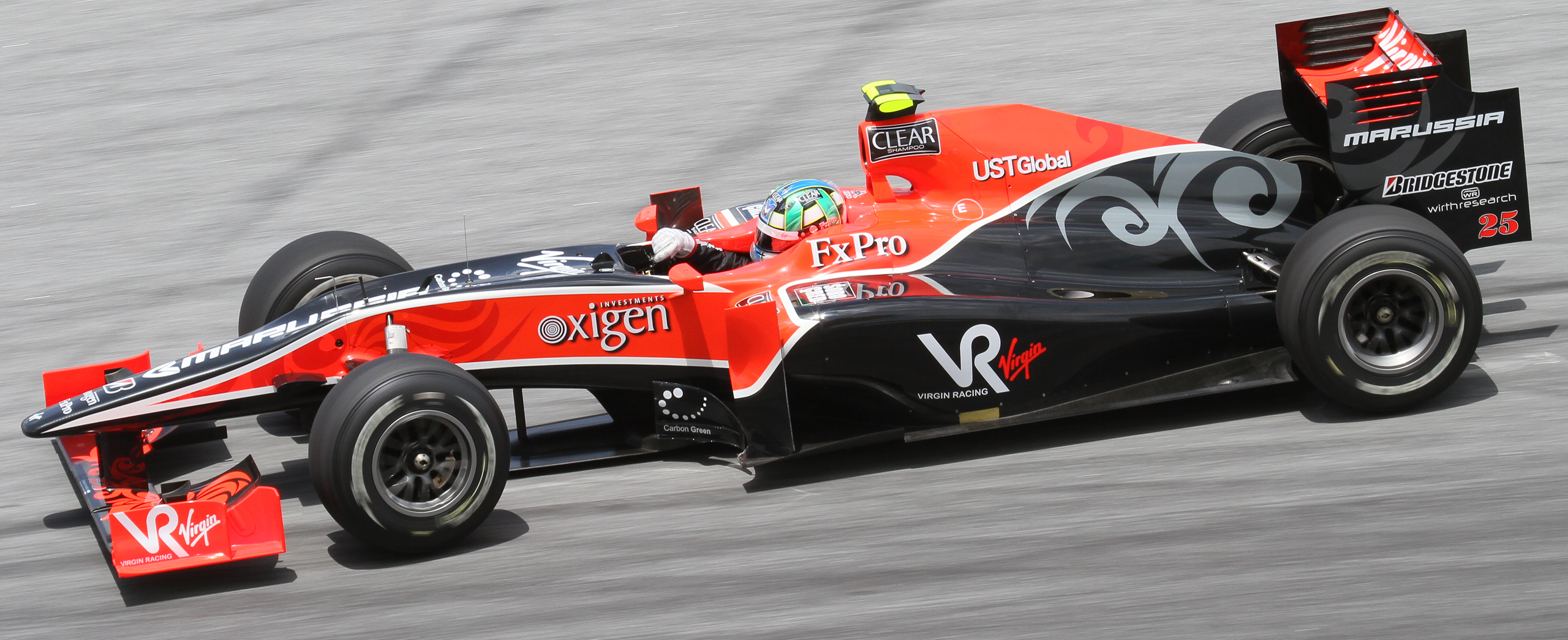
Di Grassi took the car's first race finish with fourteenth position at the Malaysian Grand Prix.

At the Malaysian Grand Prix qualifying, a heavy storm lashed the circuit, proved pivotal – as the track started to dry in the last moments of qualifying. McLaren and Ferrari drivers inexplicably opted to remain in their garages while the rest of the field set banker laps, before the rain arrived. By the time they made their way onto the track, the rain had set in, and it proved impossible to complete a lap good enough to make it into Q2. This meant Timo Glock qualified in 16th, ahead of both McLaren and Ferrari, while di Grassi qualified 24th. Glock was overtaken on the first lap, and retired on lap three after a collision with Jarno Trulli. di Grassi overtook rivals Lotus Racing and Hispania Racing to finish 14th, Virgin and di Grassi's first-ever finish in Formula One, albeit on fuel conservation mode.

At the Chinese Grand Prix, Glock was forced to start from pit lane alongside di Grassi after the team failed to lower him from the front jack on the grid in time for the warmup lap. Glock was returned to the pits, but never started after an engine failure manifested itself. Di Grassi trundled behind Karun Chandhok until he retired with clutch failure after and retired on lap 8.

Virgin's solution to their problem of having a too-small fuel tank was to bring a longer chassis to the Spanish Grand Prix to accommodate a larger fuel tank and a brand-new fuel feed system that would allow them to run as light as possible during qualifying. The VR-01 was also given a "shark fin" engine cowling. However, owing to the 2010 eruptions of Eyjafjallajökull in Iceland that had disrupted air travel across Europe at the time of the previous race, only one chassis was able to make it to Barcelona, to be used by Timo Glock. In practice, Virgin were given a penalty after the team failed to notify the FIA of changes to their gear ratios before the deadline. Glock and di Grassi qualified 22nd and 23rd, and Virgin scored their first-ever double car finish with 18th and 19th, the last of the finishers, although di Grassi battled with car setup and was the last driver to finish the race.

At Monaco, the Virgin's qualified behind the Lotus' but ahead of the HRT's. Glock and di Grassi tried to defend from Alonso, with di Grassi claiming plenty of TV coverage in the opening stages with Alonso waving his hand at di Grassi's driving up turn 1 and 2. It took 3 laps for Alonso to pass. On lap 22, Glock retired with a broken track rod, and di Grassi retired on lap 25 due to his right-rear wheel becoming loose at his pit stop.

At Turkey Virgin managed to procure a longer-wheelbase version of the VR-01 for Lucas di Grassi after the 2010 eruptions of Eyjafjallajökull. The Cosworth engines suffered problems, but Virgin managed to score another double finish, ahead of HRT and Lotus, albeit only Chandhok was a classified finisher of these rivals.

At Canada, Hispania improved a lot. They beat Virgin in free practice, and split qualified in front of them. Glock retired due to a steering rack leak that crippled his VR-01 on lap fifty-five. An early flurry of pit calls and incidents helped di Grassi to climb up to 10th place by lap 9, but the Brazilian fell through the field over the following laps as the Virgin VR-01 lacked all of the qualities of its fellow cars. His cause was not entirely helped by a hydraulics issue and he finished 5 laps down.

Hispania was now level with Virgin. At Europe, Virgin qualified ahead of them. On lap 36, Glock attempted to pass Senna around the outside heading into the first corner but was unable to move ahead. On lap 37, Glock again attempted to overtake Senna but the two cars collided. The incident caused a puncture on Glock's car that very nearly threw him into the wall and forced him to make a pit stop, though his crew was not ready for him and he lost several seconds as the tyres were brought out. Senna remained on the circuit with a damaged front wing, and made a pit stop on the next lap. Glock was also given a 20-second time penalty for not observing blue flags. Di Grassi finished 17th, ahead of Chandhok, Glock and Senna.

Virgin finally brought a big update to the car for Britain. They qualified ahead of both Hispania Racing cars and split the Lotuses. But di Grassi retired with hydraulic failure on Lap 9. Timo Glock had a simple race and was within sight of the Lotuses when he crossed the line as the finish line. He finished ahead of the HRTs.

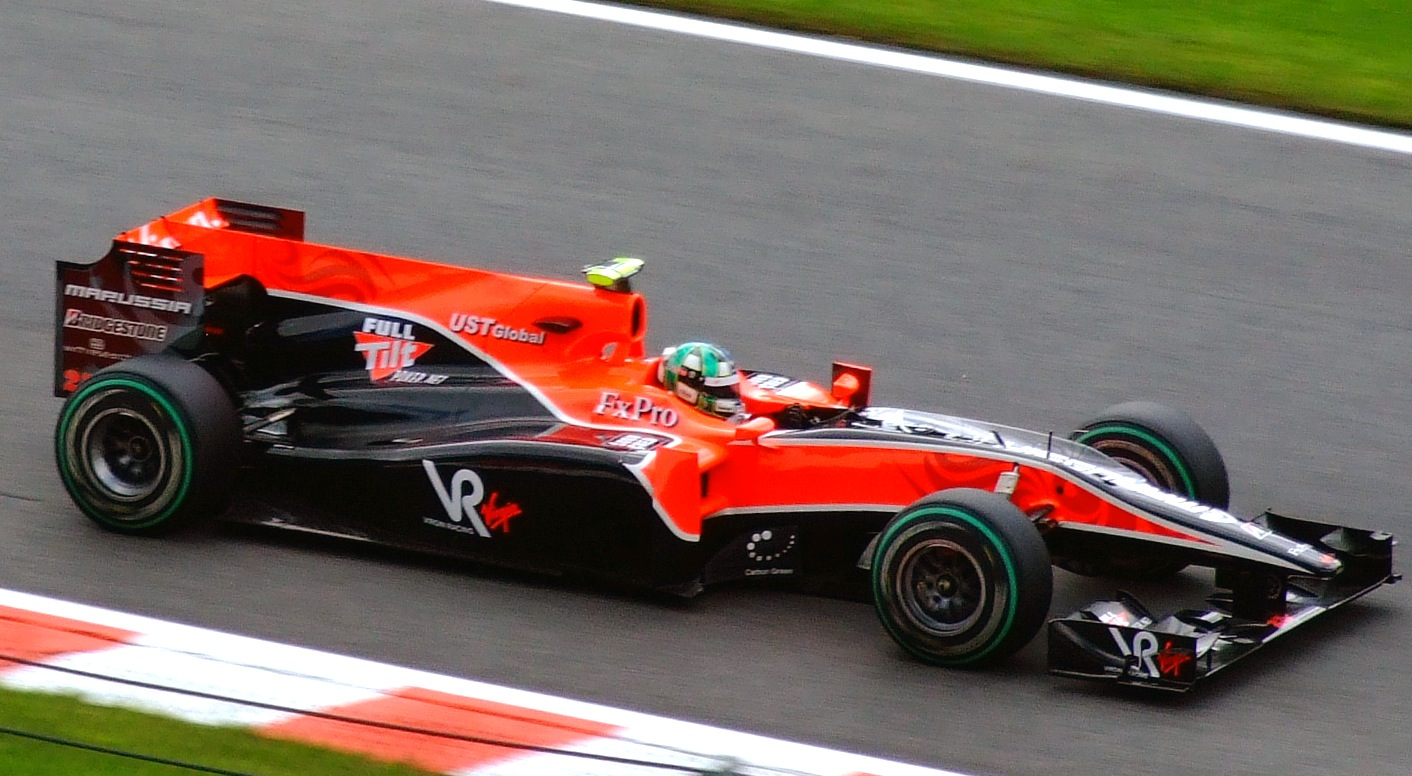
Di Grassi driving the updated VR-01 during the Belgian Grand Prix.

Di Grassi had impressed the Virgin Racing engineers with his feedback but Booth had not been satisfied with his pace against Glock and scouted an alternative driver that ended with Booth coming into contact with the Belgian racer Jérôme d'Ambrosio. D'Ambrosio became the new Virgin reserve driver, and was handed di Grassi's car in the first Singapore practice session. d’Ambrosio ended the session just over 0.2 seconds behind Glock

At the Japanese Grand Prix, Di Grassi out qualified Glock, but had a heavy accident on the way to the grid, leaving the track at the entrance to 130R, fishtailing wildly and spinning out across the run-off area and hitting the wall. Glock, on the other hand, finished a strong 12th, ahead of both Hispanias, but behind both Lotus Racing cars.

In the Korean Grand Prix, Di Grassi lost control of his car while trying to overtake the Hispania driver Sakon Yamamoto and crashed into the barriers on the 26th lap. Glock was on a roll in Korea heading for 12th place after starting in 20th in very wet conditions. This 12th place would have meant Virgin would have been 10th in the constructors, since no other of the 3 teams had finished that high. On lap 31, Buemi tried to pass Glock on the outside heading into turn three but lost control of his car under braking and rammed into the side of Glock. Buemi sustained a broken left, front suspension, and front wing damage, causing him to retire. Glock drove back to his pit box where his mechanics examined his car for damage and decided to retire him from the race. This wrecked Virgin's chances of finishing 10th in the Constructors' table.

At the Brazilian Grand Prix, Di Grassi in his home race struggled with problems with his suspension and despite his team's mechanics rectifying the issue at his mid-race pit stop, he was not classified in the final results. Glock finished 20th.

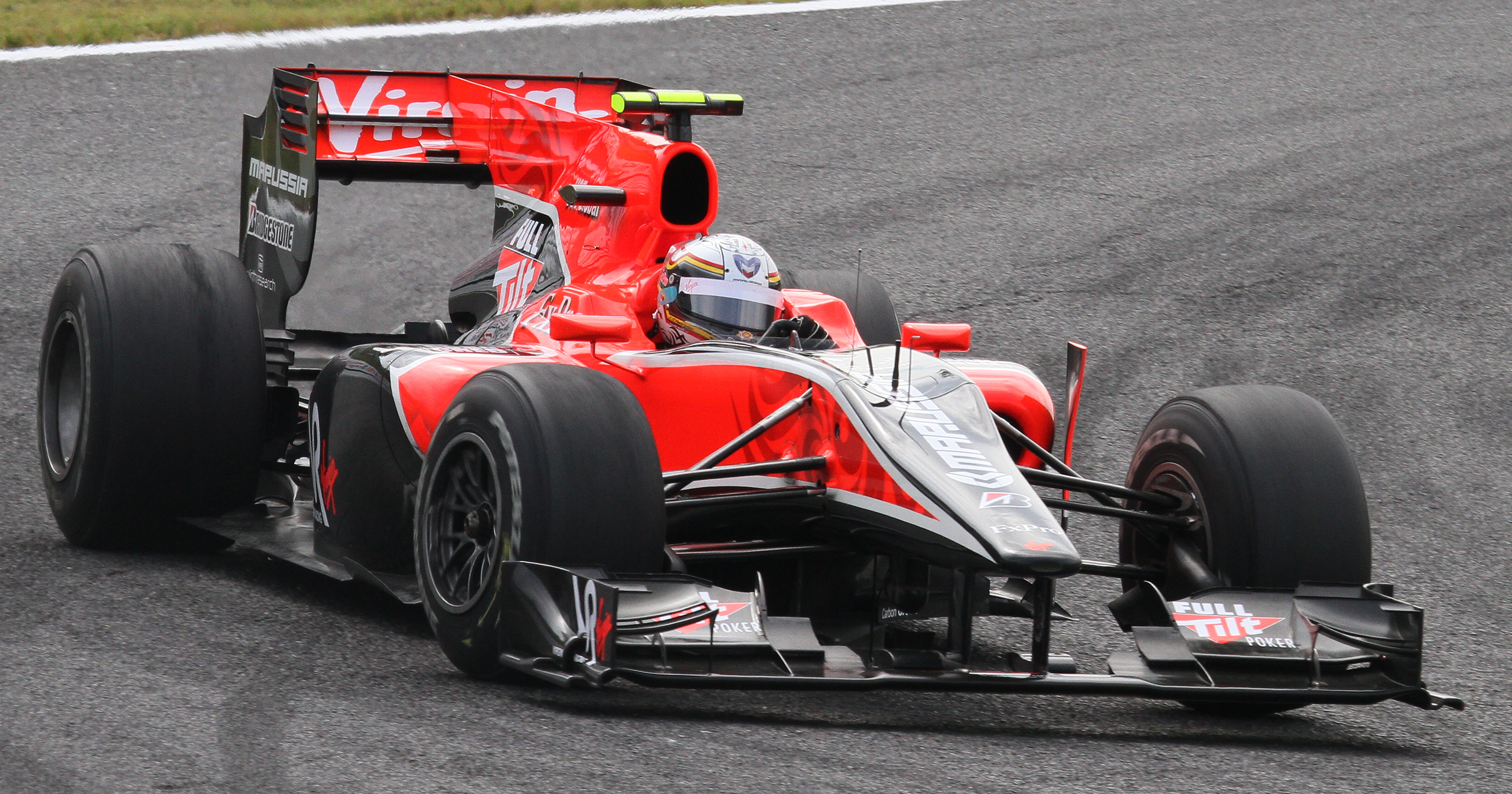
D'Ambrosio made his second free practice appearance for the team during the Japanese Grand Prix.

In November 2010, Bernie Ecclestone called the three new teams "cripples" and said "They do nothing for us, they are an embarrassment. We need to get rid of a few of those cripples. He also said "Richard should put some money in there, shouldn't he? He could do what (Red Bull chief Dietrich Mateschitz) has done and put some money in." But John Booth said that it was unfair to suggest Branson should put more money into the team, saying how "He was very brave joining a start-up operation that might have gone horribly wrong and he's been supportive throughout and brought us new backers."

At the season-ending Abu Dhabi Grand Prix, Di Grassi chose to make a pit stop for new tyres during a safety car period and managed them until the end of the race, while Glock retired. After the race, Di Grassi commented "We had to do more than 50 laps with the same set of tyres, which seemed like a difficult task, but we managed it. I am ending the year with a feeling of 'mission accomplished'".

Hispania managed to pick up some 15th places in Singapore and Japan, and along with Virgin's unreliability at the start and not finishing 12th in Korea meant Hispania Racing finished ahead of them in the constructors championship, despite having a much slower car. Glock and Di Grassi only managed two 14th-place finishes between them compared to the Hispania drivers' three.

Di Grassi ultimately didn’t have the pace to match Glock, although at times he wasn’t using the same equipment. He was replaced by Jerome d'Ambrosio for 2011.

== Trivia ==
On 16 December 2009, Tony Fernandes, owner of Air Asia and Lotus F1 Racing accepted a "challenge" from Richard Branson. The losing team's boss would work on the winner's airline for a day dressed as a stewardess. Fernandes joked "The sexier the better. Our passengers will be delighted to be served by a Knight of the Realm, but knowing Richard, the real challenge will be to prevent him from asking our guests 'coffee, tea or me?' That would be scary." In addition, the team produced a poster depicting Branson in an Air Asia uniform. However, the date of the flight was delayed several times: first because of Branson breaking his leg, then because of the royal wedding, finally because of a fire at the Necker Island. On 19 December 2012, Fernandes announced that Branson would honour his bet in May 2013. Branson ultimately honoured the bet on 13 May 2013.

== Complete Formula One results ==
(key) (results in bold indicate pole position; results in italics indicate fastest lap)

Year	Entrant	Engine	Tyres	Drivers	1	2	3	4	5	6	7	8	9	10	11	12	13	14	15	16	17	18	19	Points	WCC
2010	Virgin Racing	Cosworth CA2010 V8	**B**		BHR	AUS	MAL	CHN	ESP	MON	TUR	CAN	EUR	GBR	GER	HUN	BEL	ITA	SIN	JPN	KOR	BRA	ABU	0	12th
2010	Virgin Racing	Cosworth CA2010 V8	**B**	Glock	Ret	Ret	Ret	DNS	18	Ret	18	Ret	19	18	18	16	18	17	Ret	14	Ret	20	Ret	0	12th
2010	Virgin Racing	Cosworth CA2010 V8	**B**	di Grassi	Ret	Ret	14	Ret	19	Ret	19	19	17	Ret	Ret	18	17	20^{†}	15	DNS	Ret	NC	18	0	12th

^{†} Driver failed to finish, but was classified as they had completed >90% of the race distance.
