= Stuart Barlow (engineer) =

British engineer

- Education: Oxford Brookes University
- Occupation: Engineer
- Employer: Alpine F1 Team
- Title: Race engineer

Stuart Barlow is a British Formula One and motorsports engineer. He is currently the race engineer to Franco Colapinto at the Alpine F1 Team.

== Career ==
Barlow graduated from Oxford Brookes University with a degree in Motorsport and Automotive Engineering. He began his motorsport career working on GT2 cars with CRS Racing and Alan Docking Racing. In 2011, Barlow became a trackside performance engineer for Audi Team Joest in the FIA World Endurance Championship, helping the team secure victory at the 2011 24 Hours of Le Mans. He later worked for Wirth Research, supporting the company's IndyCar programme. Barlow moved into Formula One in 2016 with Manor Racing as a Performance Engineer, working with rookie Pascal Wehrlein. The following year he joined the HWA Team as a Performance Engineer on the Mercedes-Benz DTM programme. He partnered Gary Paffett during the 2017 and 2018 seasons, contributing to Mercedes securing the Drivers’, Teams’ and Manufacturers’ Championships in 2018. He also worked on Mercedes’ entry into Formula E.

Barlow returned to Formula One with the Renault F1 Team in 2019, initially serving as a Test Team Engineer. Following the team's rebranding as the Alpine F1 Team, he was appointed Performance Engineer to Esteban Ocon from 2021 to 2024. In this role he focused on car set-up, data analysis and performance optimisation, contributing to several podium finishes, including victory at the 2021 Hungarian Grand Prix. For the 2025 season Barlow was promoted to Race Engineer, working first with Jack Doohan and later Franco Colapinto following a mid-season driver change. In this capacity he leads trackside engineering operations for the Argentine driver, directing car performance and race execution during Grand Prix weekends.
