= Nicholas Wirth =

Nicholas Wirth may refer to:

- Nick Wirth (born 1966), automotive engineer
- Niklaus Wirth (1934–2024), Swiss computer scientist

== See also ==
- Nicholas Worth (1937–2007), American character actor
