= Nick Wirth =

British engineer and car designer (born 1966)

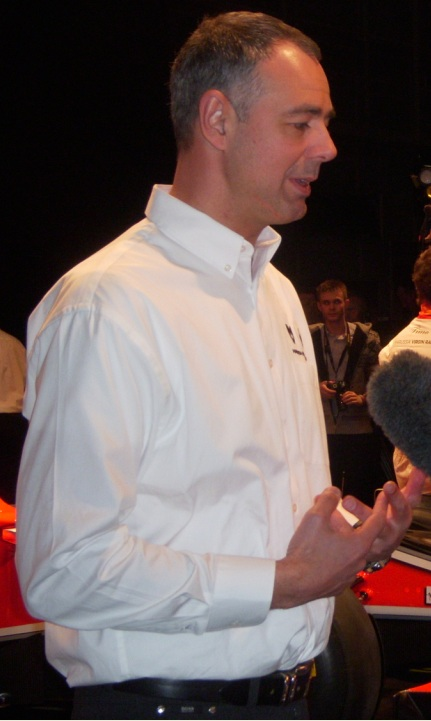
- Nick Wirth at the BBC Television Studio.
- Born: Nicholas John Peter Wirth; 26 March 1966 (age 60)
- Employer: Wirth Research
- Known for: Simtek; Virgin Racing

Nicholas John Peter Wirth (born 26 March 1966) is an automotive engineer and the founder and owner of Wirth Research.

He is also the former owner of the Simtek Formula One team, a former aerodynamicist at March and former technical director at the Benetton, and Virgin Racing teams.

== Education and early life ==
Wirth attended Sevenoaks School from 1977 to 1984 and has B.Sc(Hons) in Mechanical Engineering (First Class) from University College London and is the youngest-ever Fellow of the Royal Institution of Mechanical Engineers.

== Simtek ==
From October 1993 to June 1995, Wirth was founder, owner, and technical director of Simtek Grand Prix, a Formula One racing team that first appeared in the 1994 Formula One season.

== Virgin Racing ==
In 2009 Wirth Design teamed up with John Booth of Manor Motorsport to create a car for the 2010 Formula One season. Wirth was appointed the technical director of the team. Richard Branson's company Virgin became a title sponsor and the team was renamed Virgin Racing. The car that Wirth designed for use in the 2010 season, the Virgin VR-01, is the first Formula One racing car designed entirely with computational fluid dynamics with no use of traditional wind tunnels during the design or build process.

Wirth also designed Virgin's second F1 car, the MVR-02, but its performance proved to be disappointing as it failed to close the gap to the leaders relative to the VR-01. In June 2011, Virgin announced that it had parted company with Wirth and abandoned its policy of only using CFD.
