= 2010 Spanish Grand Prix =

Race 5 of 19 in the 2010 Formula One World Championship
← Previous race	Next race →
- Circuit de Catalunya

Race details
- Date: 9 May 2010
- Official name: Formula 1 Gran Premio de España Telefónica 2010
- Location: Circuit de Catalunya, Montmeló, Catalonia, Spain
- Course: Permanent racing facility
- Course length: 4.655 km (2.892 miles)
- Distance: 66 laps, 307.104 km (190.826 miles)
- Weather: Mainly cloudy, dry
- Attendance: 98,200

Pole position
Driver	(Australia) Mark Webber	Red Bull-Renault
- Time: 1:19.995

Fastest lap
Driver	(United Kingdom) Lewis Hamilton	McLaren-Mercedes
- Time: 1:24.357 on lap 59

Podium
First	(Australia) Mark Webber	Red Bull-Renault
Second	(Spain) Fernando Alonso	Ferrari
Third	(Germany) Sebastian Vettel	Red Bull-Renault

The 2010 Spanish Grand Prix (officially the Formula 1 Gran Premio de España Telefónica 2010) was the fifth round of the 2010 Formula One season. It was held on 9 May 2010 at the Circuit de Catalunya. It was the first European race of the 2010 season, and was ultimately won by Red Bull's Mark Webber after the Australian qualified on pole and led every lap of the race. The final result meant that Button kept his championship lead going into the next round by just three points from Alonso, while the same amount separated McLaren from Ferrari in the constructors' standings, with Red Bull only a further three points behind.

== Report ==
=== Background ===
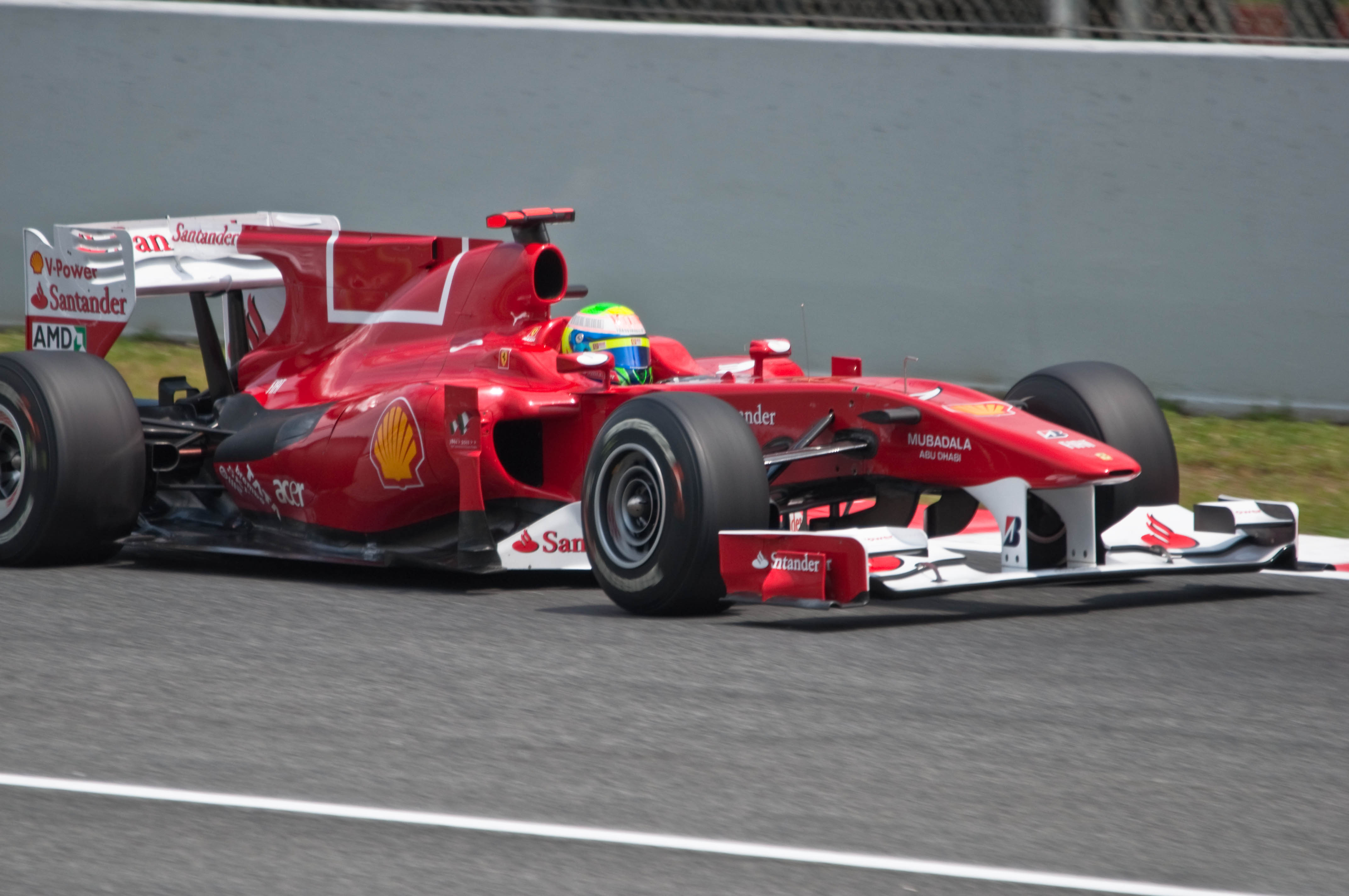
Ferrari changed the livery on the F10's engine cover after the team was accused of promoting Marlboro cigarettes with its previous design.

The lead-up to the first practice session saw the media focus on several major upgrades various teams had introduced in time for the start of the European season. Mercedes abandoned the use of an airbox mounted atop the engine cowling, in favour of a rigid vertical rollbar and two pronounced air intakes directly behind the driver's cockpit. Virgin's solution to their problem of having a too-small fuel tank was to bring a longer chassis to accommodate a larger fuel tank and a brand-new fuel feed system that would allow them to run as light as possible during qualifying. The VR-01 was also given a "shark fin" engine cowling. However, owing to the volcanic eruptions in Iceland that had disrupted air travel across Europe at the time of the previous race, only one chassis was able to make it to Barcelona, to be used by Timo Glock. Following several dramatic engine problems that had affected both them and their customer teams, Ferrari were given permission by the FIA to modify their engines. In the wake of controversy that arose from accusations that their generic Marlboro "barcode" decal contained subliminal advertising, Ferrari removed all traces of it from their car for the weekend. Elsewhere, Hispania signed former Jaguar driver Christian Klien as a test driver, running him in the place of Karun Chandhok for the first practice session. Klien's FIA Super Licence – the licence that allows a driver to race in Formula One – was reported to have expired as he had not raced in over three years (his last appearance being at the 2006 Italian Grand Prix), which would have prevented him from leaving pit lane and taking to the circuit. Klien took part in the session, with reports claiming that his racing licence had been renewed just ten minutes before the session began.

=== Practice and qualifying ===
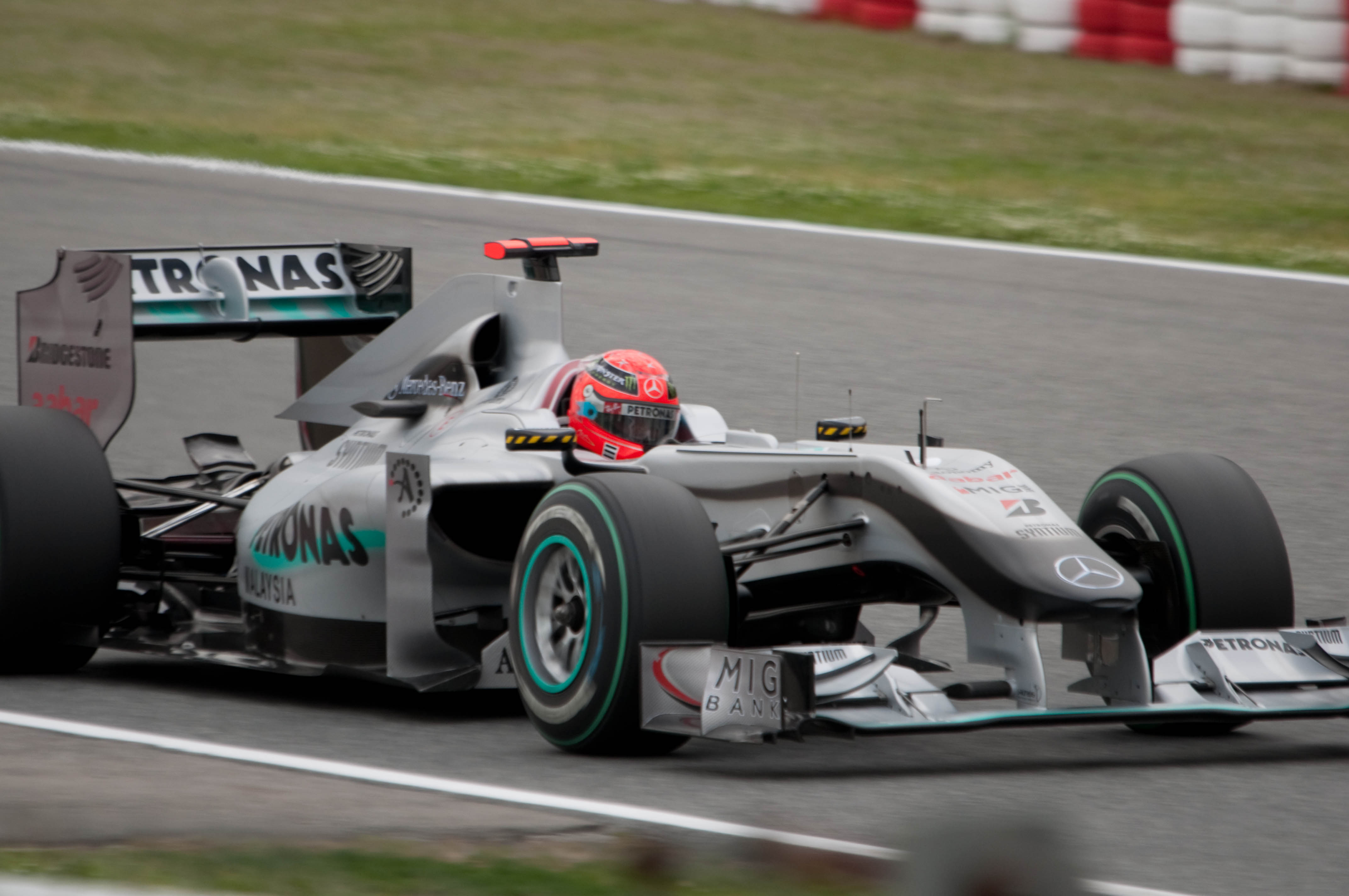
Michael Schumacher outqualified his Mercedes team-mate Nico Rosberg for the first time in the season.

The first practice session was incident-free, save for Sauber's Pedro de la Rosa falling victim to a gearbox failure. Lewis Hamilton and Jenson Button topped the timing sheets for McLaren, with Michael Schumacher experiencing a resurgence to finish third after a poor opening to his 2010 campaign. The German later admitted that the team's updates to the W01 had inspired more confidence in him. Local favourite Fernando Alonso was eighth for Ferrari, sandwiched between the Renaults of Robert Kubica and Vitaly Petrov. Heikki Kovalainen was once again the fastest of the new teams, his Lotus T127 finishing four seconds slower than Hamilton and less than two behind the Williams of Nico Hülkenberg.

Hülkenberg would later provide drama in the second session, when an off-track excursion at the exit of Campsa resulted in an impact with the wall that tore the front wing off. Toro Rosso's Jaime Alguersuari stopped on the circuit with just a few minutes remaining in the session, with the recovery truck hitting a bridge as it returned the stricken car to the pits. The session was topped by Sebastian Vettel, followed closely by teammate Mark Webber and Schumacher once again setting the third-fastest time. Alonso improved to fourth, while the McLarens of Hamilton and Button slipped backwards; Hamilton finishing fifth and Button ninth. Jarno Trulli supplanted teammate Kovalainen as the fastest of the new teams.

The third session was marked by separate incidents by Petrov and Kamui Kobayashi, both of whom found a puddle of standing water in the middle of the Repsol corner just minutes apart. Kobayashi survived unscathed, but Petrov spun and crashed. The damage to his R30 was extensive enough to warrant the team changing his gearbox, earning himself a five-place grid penalty. Similar penalties were applied to both Virgin Racing cars after the team failed to notify the FIA of changes to their gear ratios before the deadline, and to Hispania's Karun Chandhok, who replaced his gearbox.

Qualifying was a race to see who would place third on the grid as the Red Bulls of Webber and Vettel setting the fastest times in each of the three session. Webber went on to take pole position. Q1 saw the elimination of the six newcomers – a running theme throughout the season – as well as the Williams of Rubens Barrichello. Barrichello claimed he had been unable to understand his engineer while out on the circuit. The Circuit de Catalunya has a history of radio-related problems; during practice sessions for the 2009 race, Mark Webber reported being able to hear Spanish truck drivers talking to one another over CB radios. Lotus was once again the fastest of the newcomers, with Trulli and Kovalainen qualifying nineteenth and twentieth respectively, ahead of the two Virgins and the two Hispanias.

The second session was similarly themed, as Sutil, de la Rosa, Hülkenberg, Petrov, Buemi, Alguersuari and Liuzzi all fell away. Just four tenths of a second separated all but Aluguersuari and Liuzzi from making it into Q3. Elsewhere, Mercedes elected not to send Michael Schumacher out to join everyone else late in the session as they were confident his time would be enough to see him through to the final session. Ferrari committed to a similar course of action in 2009, with the result being that Kimi Räikkönen was eliminated early on.

The final ten-minute period was once again dominated by Red Bull, with Webber to the fore. Hamilton edged out local hero Alonso for third on the grid, while Button narrowly missed out on putting his MP4-25 alongside his team-mate. Schumacher slotted into sixth place, followed by Kubica, Nico Rosberg, Felipe Massa and Kobayashi. Ferrari were later fined US$20,000 (in keeping with the sport's strict financial penalty rule) for an unsafe release that saw Alonso deployed directly into the path of Rosberg; the young German was forced to swerve in the direction of the pit wall – and came close to contact with it – in order to avoid a collision.

=== Race ===
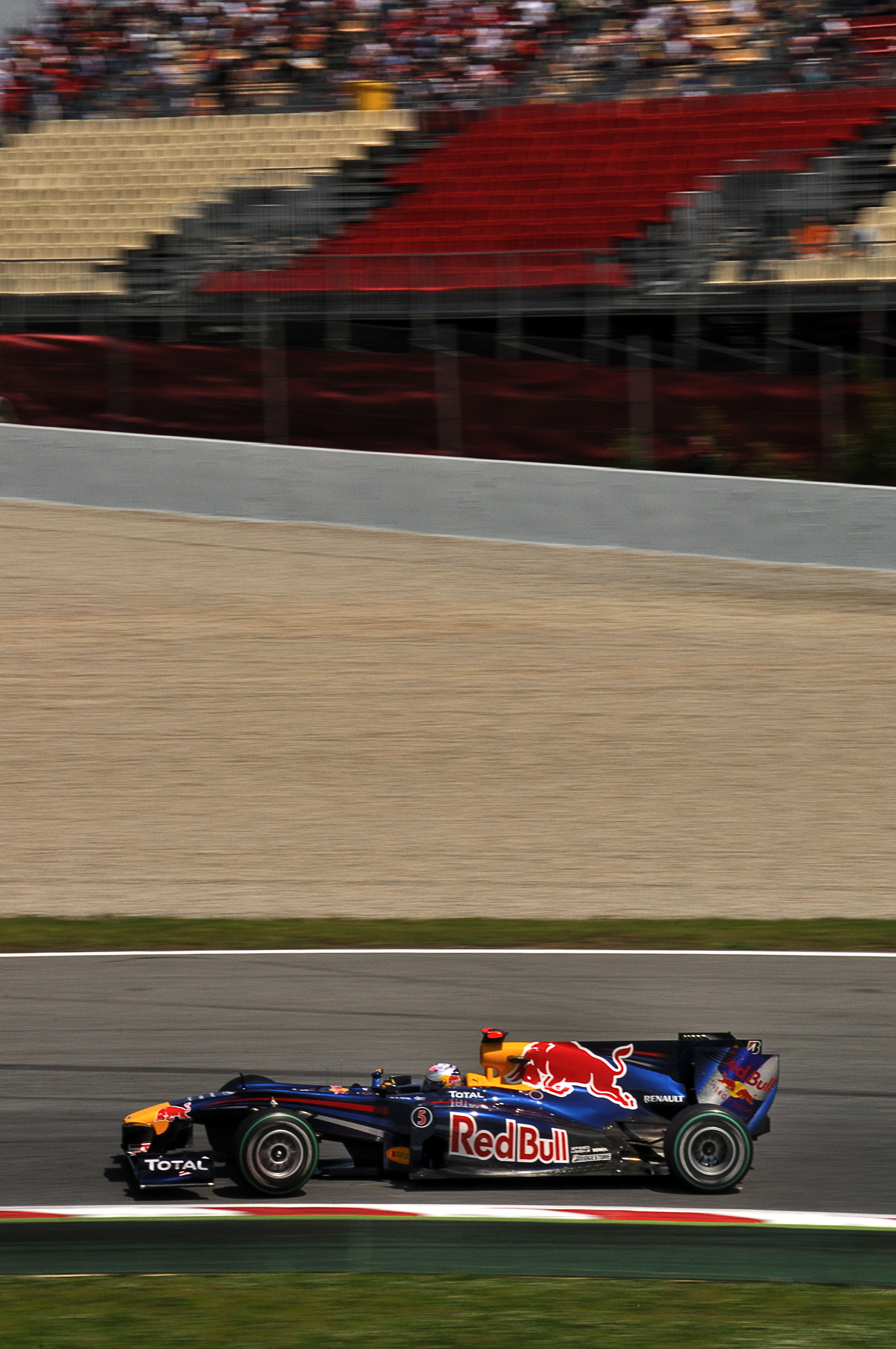
Sebastian Vettel qualified second, but dropped to third place in the race due to brake problems.

The front-row starting Red Bulls of Mark Webber and Sebastian Vettel started well off the line, and even though they were challenged by Lewis Hamilton and local hero Fernando Alonso on the long dragrace to the first corner, they maintained their positions with polesitter Webber leading. Reigning world champion Jenson Button and seven-time world champion Michael Schumacher kept fifth and sixth, but there was light contact between Robert Kubica and Kamui Kobayashi which sent both falling down the order. Nico Rosberg in the second Mercedes was forced to take evasive action and ran onto the grass. Kobayashi's BMW Sauber team-mate Pedro de la Rosa had a similar altercation with Sébastien Buemi that resulted in a puncture for the Spaniard, while Buemi was demoted to last on the road. The incident would later morph into a greater problem for de la Rosa, forcing him to retire with accident damage. The other first-lap incident saw an early exit for Bruno Senna, his Hispania spearing into the barriers at the same corner as the Buemi-de la Rosa incident. Lotus's Heikki Kovalainen was the only driver who failed to start the race when his gearbox software attempted to select two gears at the same time.

The Red Bulls, especially Webber, slowly started pulling away from Hamilton, but the rate at which he pulled away was not as quick as one would have expected. The gap to Hamilton increased by two or three tenths of a second per lap, not by a full second as suggested in practice and qualifying. The first and only round of pit stops came shortly after lap fifteen, and a mistake by Red Bull cost Vettel four seconds, and a place to Hamilton. McLaren also did not have a perfect pitstop with Button, the result being that he came out behind Schumacher at the end of turn 1. Button was later critical of the German's swipe across the circuit to claim the position. He spent the rest of the race looking at the Mercedes' rear wing.

The sole surviving Hispania of Karun Chandhok was caught up in two separate incidents in the final sector of the circuit. The first saw contact between his car and Felipe Massa's Ferrari as the latter attempted to lap him as they negotiated the corner before the final chicane; Massa, who had been lacking speed all weekend, experienced a better-handling car with a damaged front wing. A pitstop would have meant dropping down at least two or three places for Massa and since the handling of the car wasn't hampered much due to the damage, the team took the decision of not bringing Massa in for a front wing change. The second of Chandhok's incidents saw Jaime Alguersuari chop across his front end at the same corner, knocking his front wing off. Chandhok was forced to pit, but retired a lap later with suspension damage caused by the collision; Alguersuari was given a drive through penalty for his efforts. His team-mate Buemi had been penalised earlier after rejoining the track in unsafe manner, just ahead of Jarno Trulli.

Williams gambled on a two-stop strategy for Nico Hülkenberg, a mistake that shunted the German driver down the order where he was caught up in a duel with a struggling Rosberg. Sébastien Buemi was the only other retirement, stopping on lap forty-four with hydraulics problems.

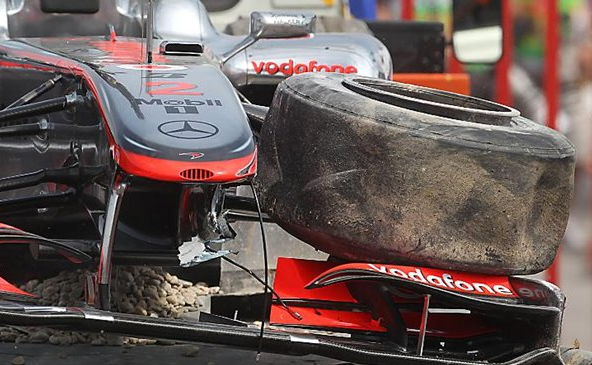
Lewis Hamilton had a wheel rim failure on the penultimate lap and crashed out of second place.

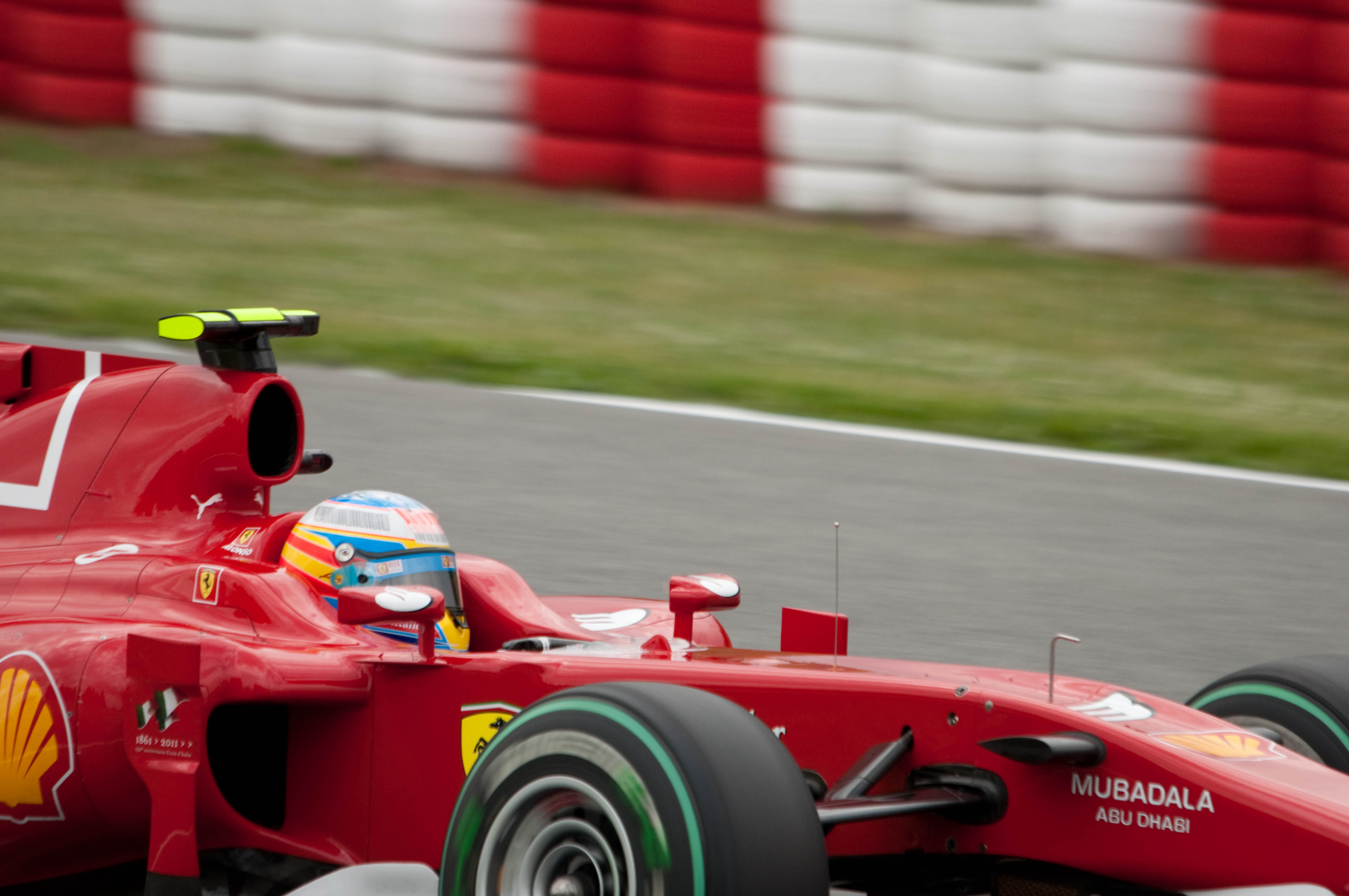
Local favourite Fernando Alonso took second place as a result of Hamilton's problems.

The race order settled down with Webber leading from Hamilton and Vettel. Alonso was fourth, ahead of the Schumacher-Button scrap which Massa also joined, with Sutil, Kubica and the recovering Rubens Barrichello in the Williams completing the top ten. On lap fifty-four, Vettel went wide at turn six, with a suspected front brake failure and had a trip across the gravel. This damaged his tyres, and he came in for inspection and also for a new set of tyres, which dropped him behind Alonso. It was soon evident that he was struggling with brake issues, and thus Vettel had to slow down for the rest of the race to nurse his brakes and finish the race. On lap sixty-five – the penultimate lap of the race – Hamilton lost second place when he suffered a left-front tyre puncture followed shortly by a blowout at turn three, which punted him into the wall, although far less violently than when a similar accident claimed then McLaren teammate Heikki Kovalainen at the 2008 race. He was classified as finishing fourteenth as he had completed 90% of the winner's race distance, his accident gifting second place to Alonso and allowing the fading Vettel back onto the podium for third. Vitantonio Liuzzi suffered a similar fate to Hamilton when his engine gave up on the same lap, the Italian stopping on the circuit.

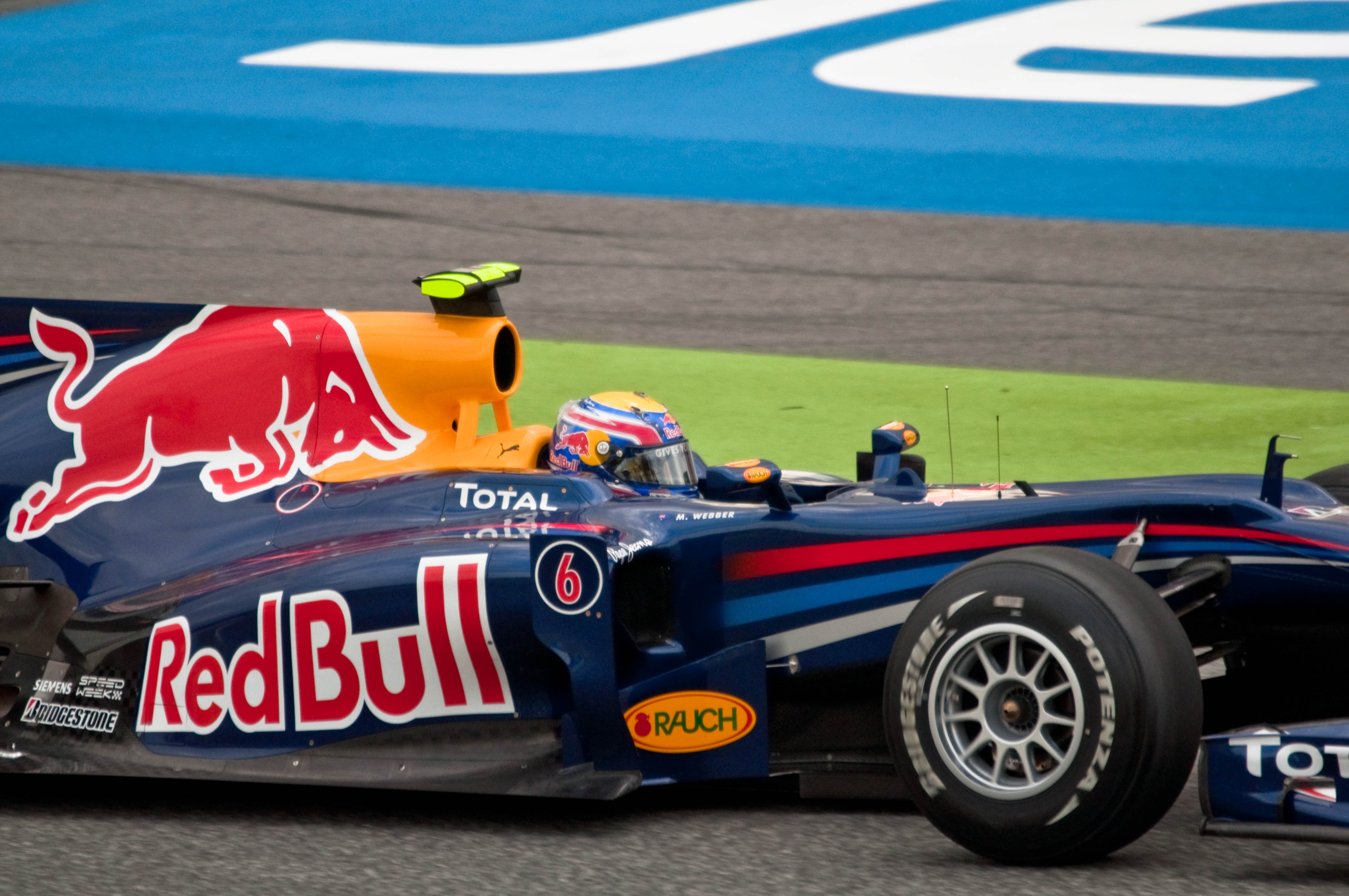
Mark Webber won his first race of the season from pole position.

Mark Webber crossed the finish line first, becoming the tenth driver in ten Spanish Grands Prix to win from pole. Alonso finished second, with Vettel third and the unresolved Schumacher-Button scrap seeing the former World Champion home before the defending champion. Massa finished sixth, followed by Sutil, Kubica, and Barrichello and Alguersuari, who were a lap down. Jarno Trulli's Lotus was the first of the new teams to finish the race, whilst Virgin Racing notched up their first double-finish of the season, despite Timo Glock and Lucas di Grassi driving different versions of the VR-01.

=== Post-race ===
The top three drivers appeared on the podium to collect their trophies and spoke to the media at a later press conference. Red Bull team mechanic Kenny Handkammer appeared on the podium to receive the winning manufacturer's award.

== Classification ==
=== Qualifying ===
Pos	No	Driver	Constructor	Part 1	Part 2	Part 3	Grid
1	6	(Australia) Mark Webber	Red Bull-Renault	1:21.412	1:20.655	1:19.995	1
2	5	(Germany) Sebastian Vettel	Red Bull-Renault	1:21.680	1:20.772	1:20.101	2
3	2	(United Kingdom) Lewis Hamilton	McLaren-Mercedes	1:21.723	1:21.415	1:20.829	3
4	8	(Spain) Fernando Alonso	Ferrari	1:21.957	1:21.549	1:20.937	4
5	1	(United Kingdom) Jenson Button	McLaren-Mercedes	1:21.915	1:21.168	1:20.991	5
6	3	(Germany) Michael Schumacher	Mercedes	1:22.528	1:21.557	1:21.294	6
7	11	(Poland) Robert Kubica	Renault	1:22.488	1:21.599	1:21.353	7
8	4	(Germany) Nico Rosberg	Mercedes	1:22.419	1:21.867	1:21.408	8
9	7	(Brazil) Felipe Massa	Ferrari	1:22.564	1:21.841	1:21.585	9
10	23	(Japan) Kamui Kobayashi	BMW Sauber-Ferrari	1:22.577	1:21.725	1:21.984	10
11	14	(Germany) Adrian Sutil	Force India-Mercedes	1:22.628	1:21.985		11
12	22	(Spain) Pedro de la Rosa	BMW Sauber-Ferrari	1:22.211	1:22.026		12
13	10	(Germany) Nico Hülkenberg	Williams-Cosworth	1:22.857	1:22.131		13
14	12	(Russia) Vitaly Petrov	Renault	1:22.976	1:22.139		19^{1}
15	16	(Switzerland) Sébastien Buemi	Toro Rosso-Ferrari	1:22.699	1:22.191		14
16	17	(Spain) Jaime Alguersuari	Toro Rosso-Ferrari	1:22.593	1:22.207		15
17	15	(Italy) Vitantonio Liuzzi	Force India-Mercedes	1:23.084	1:22.854		16
18	9	(Brazil) Rubens Barrichello	Williams-Cosworth	1:23.125			17
19	18	(Italy) Jarno Trulli	Lotus-Cosworth	1:24.674			18
20	19	(Finland) Heikki Kovalainen	Lotus-Cosworth	1:24.748			20
21	24	(Germany) Timo Glock	Virgin-Cosworth	1:25.475			22^{2}
22	25	(Brazil) Lucas di Grassi	Virgin-Cosworth	1:25.556			23^{2}
23	20	(India) Karun Chandhok	HRT-Cosworth	1:26.750			24^{3}
24	21	(Brazil) Bruno Senna	HRT-Cosworth	1:27.122			21

Notes:

1. – Vitaly Petrov was given a five-place grid penalty for a gearbox change after the Russian crashed during free practice and damaged the rear end of his car.
2. – The Virgins of Timo Glock and Lucas di Grassi were both given five-place penalties after the team failed to notify the FIA of changes to their gearbox ratios before the deadline for doing so.
3. – Hispania's Karun Chandhok was also issued a five-place penalty for a similar gearbox-related infringement.

=== Race ===
Pos	No	Driver	Constructor	Laps	Time/Retired	Grid	Points
1	6	(Australia) Mark Webber	Red Bull-Renault	66	1:35:44.101	1	25
2	8	(Spain) Fernando Alonso	Ferrari	66	+24.065	4	18
3	5	(Germany) Sebastian Vettel	Red Bull-Renault	66	+51.338	2	15
4	3	(Germany) Michael Schumacher	Mercedes	66	+1:02.195	6	12
5	1	(United Kingdom) Jenson Button	McLaren-Mercedes	66	+1:03.728	5	10
6	7	(Brazil) Felipe Massa	Ferrari	66	+1:05.767	9	8
7	14	(Germany) Adrian Sutil	Force India-Mercedes	66	+1:12.941	11	6
8	11	(Poland) Robert Kubica	Renault	66	+1:13.677	7	4
9	9	(Brazil) Rubens Barrichello	Williams-Cosworth	65	+1 Lap	17	2
10	17	(Spain) Jaime Alguersuari	Toro Rosso-Ferrari	65	+1 Lap	15	1
11	12	(Russia) Vitaly Petrov	Renault	65	+1 Lap	19	
12	23	(Japan) Kamui Kobayashi	BMW Sauber-Ferrari	65	+1 Lap	10	
13	4	(Germany) Nico Rosberg	Mercedes	65	+1 Lap	8	
14^{1}	2	(United Kingdom) Lewis Hamilton	McLaren-Mercedes	64	Wheel rim/Accident^{2}	3	
15^{1}	15	(Italy) Vitantonio Liuzzi	Force India-Mercedes	64	Engine	16	
16	10	(Germany) Nico Hülkenberg	Williams-Cosworth	64	+2 Laps	13	
17	18	(Italy) Jarno Trulli	Lotus-Cosworth	63	+3 Laps	18	
18	24	(Germany) Timo Glock	Virgin-Cosworth	63	+3 Laps	22	
19	25	(Brazil) Lucas di Grassi	Virgin-Cosworth	62	+4 Laps	23	
Ret	16	(Switzerland) Sébastien Buemi	Toro Rosso-Ferrari	42	Hydraulics	14	
Ret	20	(India) Karun Chandhok	HRT-Cosworth	27	Collision damage	24	
Ret	22	(Spain) Pedro de la Rosa	BMW Sauber-Ferrari	20	Collision damage	12	
Ret	21	(Brazil) Bruno Senna	HRT-Cosworth	0	Accident	21	
DNS	19	(Finland) Heikki Kovalainen	Lotus-Cosworth	0	Gearbox	20	

Notes:

1. – Both Lewis Hamilton and Vitantonio Liuzzi were classified as they had completed 90% of the winner's race distance.
2. – Lewis Hamilton's accident was caused by a damaged wheel rim that punctured his tyre.

== Championship standings after the race ==
Drivers' Championship standings

	Pos.	Driver	Points
	1	(United Kingdom) Jenson Button	70
1	2	(Spain) Fernando Alonso	67
2	3	(Germany) Sebastian Vettel	60
4	4	(Australia) Mark Webber	53
3	5	(Germany) Nico Rosberg	50

Constructors' Championship standings

Pos.	Constructor	Points
1	(United Kingdom) McLaren-Mercedes	119
2	(Italy) Ferrari	116
3	(Austria) Red Bull-Renault	113
4	(Germany) Mercedes	72
5	(France) Renault	50

- Note: Only the top five positions are included for both sets of standings.

== See also ==
- 2010 Catalunya GP2 Series round
- 2010 Catalunya GP3 Series round

Previous race: 2010 Chinese Grand Prix	FIA Formula One World Championship; 2010 season	Next race: 2010 Monaco Grand Prix
Previous race: 2009 Spanish Grand Prix	Spanish Grand Prix	Next race: 2011 Spanish Grand Prix
