= Alex Tai =

Formula One team principal

- Born: Alexander Mark Tai; 22 October 1966 (age 59); RAF Base in Germany
- Occupation: Team Principal of Virgin Racing (2009–2010)

Alexander Mark Tai (born October 22, 1966) is the former team principal of the Virgin Racing Formula E team and former team principal of Virgin Racing Formula One team.

== Career ==
Tai was named as the Team Principal of Virgin Racing Formula One team at the team's launch in December 2009. Less than a month later, however, he left the position, saying that he was focused on "finding new opportunities and the challenge of starting new ventures." He was replaced by the team's Sporting Director, John Booth.
