= 2011 Spanish Grand Prix =

Race 5 of 19 in the 2011 Formula One World Championship
← Previous race	Next race →
- Circuit de Catalunya

Race details
- Date: 22 May 2011
- Official name: Formula 1 Gran Premio de España Santander 2011
- Location: Circuit de Catalunya, Montmeló, Catalonia, Spain
- Course: Permanent racing facility
- Course length: 4.655 km (2.892 miles)
- Distance: 66 laps, 307.104 km (190.826 miles)
- Weather: Mainly sunny, Fine and Dry Air Temp 27 °C (81 °F) Track Temp 33 °C (91 °F) to 44 °C (111 °F)
- Attendance: 78,300

Pole position
Driver	(Australia) Mark Webber	Red Bull Racing-Renault
- Time: 1:20.981

Fastest lap
Driver	(United Kingdom) Lewis Hamilton	McLaren-Mercedes
- Time: 1:26.727 on lap 52

Podium
First	(Germany) Sebastian Vettel	Red Bull Racing-Renault
Second	(United Kingdom) Lewis Hamilton	McLaren-Mercedes
Third	(United Kingdom) Jenson Button	McLaren-Mercedes

The 2011 Spanish Grand Prix, formally the Formula 1 Gran Premio de España Santander 2011, was a Formula One motor race that was held on 22 May 2011 at the Circuit de Catalunya in Montmeló, Spain. It was the fifth round of the 2011 Formula One season. The 66-lap race was won by the championship leader, Red Bull Racing's Sebastian Vettel after starting from second on the grid. McLaren's Lewis Hamilton finished in second place, and his teammate Jenson Button completed the podium in third position.

As a consequence of the race, Vettel extended his lead in the World Drivers' Championship to 41 points over Hamilton. Mark Webber, who started the race from pole position, finished fourth in the race but he maintained third place in the championship, 10 points behind second-place Hamilton, and six ahead of Button. In the World Constructors' Championship, Red Bull extended their championship lead to 47 points over McLaren, with Ferrari a further 63 points behind in third position, after only Fernando Alonso reached the finish for the team, in fifth position. Sergio Pérez finished 9th and became the first driver from Mexico to score a point since Héctor Rebaque in the 1981 Dutch Grand Prix.

== Report ==
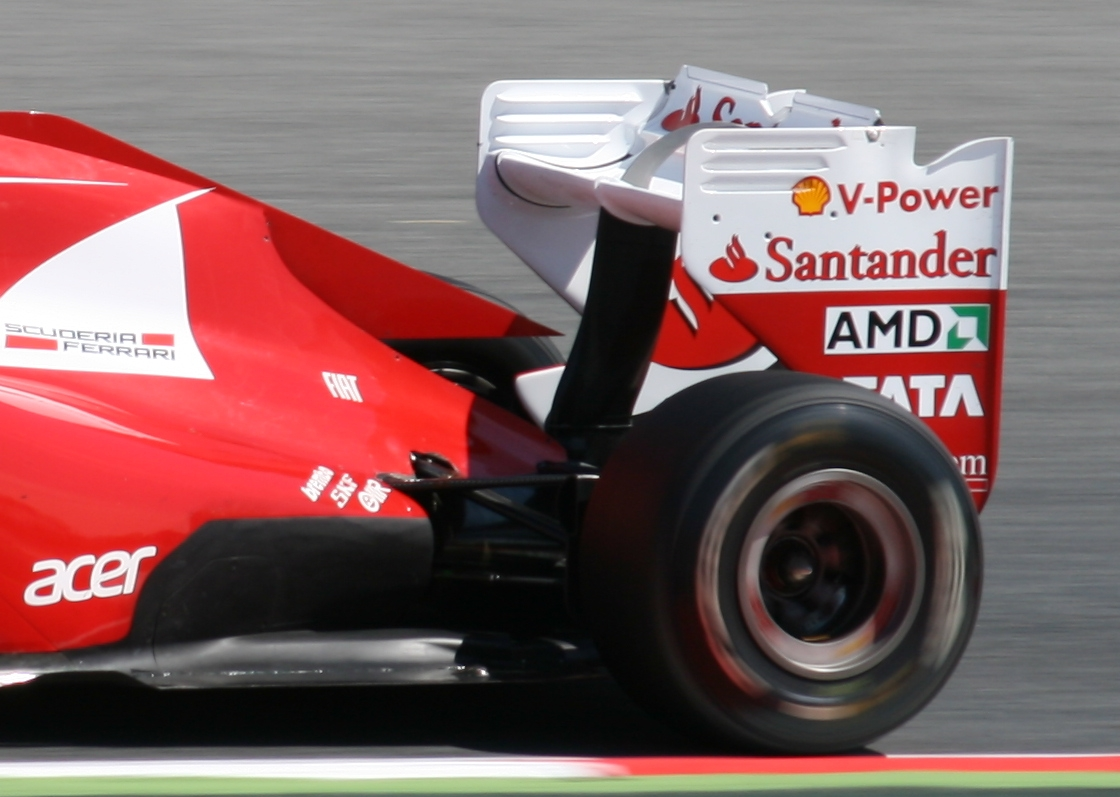
Ferrari's new rear wing was banned after Friday practice.

=== Background ===
Heading into the race, Sebastian Vettel led the Drivers' Championship with 93 points, 35 more than Lewis Hamilton on 58 points, who had 3 more than Mark Webber on 55 points. Other championship rivals throughout the season, Jenson Button and Fernando Alonso were fourth and fifth on 46 and 41 respectively.

Tyre supplier Pirelli brought its silver-banded hard compound tyre as the harder "prime" tyre and the yellow-banded soft compound as the softer "option" compound. This was the same tyre selection that Bridgestone had chosen to bring to the Spanish Grand Prix for the past two years.

In the Constructors' Championship, Red Bull Racing held an advantage of 43 points over McLaren, with 148 points to McLaren's 105. Ferrari were a further 40 points behind McLaren on 65 points, and were building a gap from Renault – on 42 points - who were now having to fend off Mercedes GP who were on 26 points.

Ferrari introduced a new rear wing for the race, which came under scrutiny from the stewards and was subsequently banned.

=== Practice and qualifying ===
The first practice session saw upgrades by every single team, and took place in sunny conditions. Mark Webber led at the end of the first practice, 1.007 seconds ahead of his teammate Sebastian Vettel, with Nico Rosberg in third place in the Mercedes.

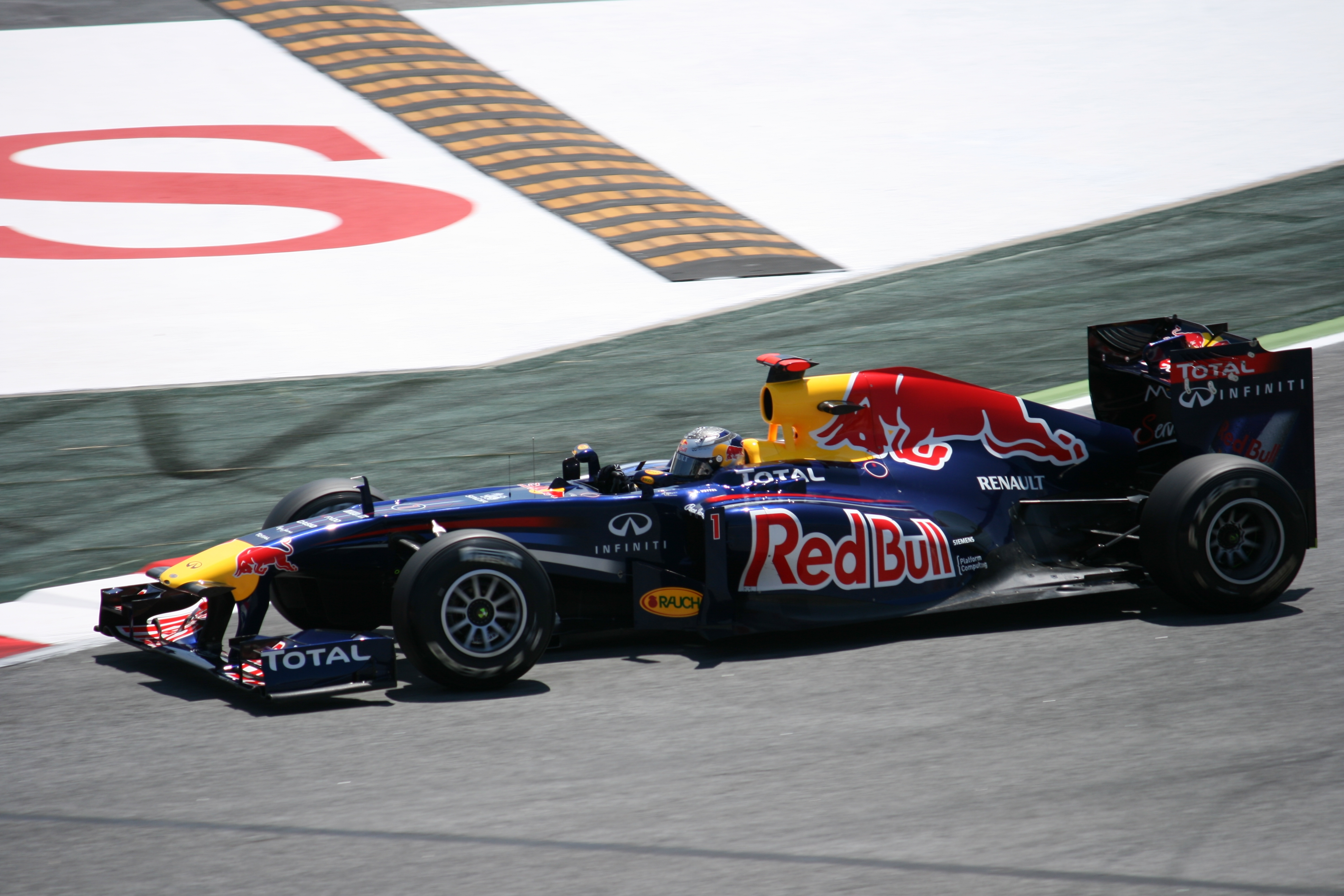
Sebastian Vettel's run of five consecutive pole positions was ended by teammate Mark Webber

In the second practice session, Webber topped the timesheets again, this time with Lewis Hamilton coming second splitting the Red Bulls with Vettel in third.

In the third practice session, Vettel topped the timesheets despite electrical problems that limited his running. Nick Heidfeld's car suffered a fire, causing extensive damage to his car that could not be fixed in time for the qualifying session.

In qualifying, Mark Webber took his first pole of the season, with his teammate Vettel, who had been unable to use his KERS during the session, behind him in second. In third and fifth places were the McLarens of Hamilton and Button, split by the Ferrari of Fernando Alonso. Further down the grid Team Lotus celebrated their first ever entry to the second qualifying session on a dry track, with Heikki Kovalainen qualifying 15th, ahead of both Force Indias.

Heidfeld was unable to set a qualifying time, however, he was allowed to participate in the race due to having set competitive times in practice prior to the accident. This was a similar situation to the previous race in Turkey where Kamui Kobayashi had not posted a qualifying time, but had been allowed entry due to his consistent lap times within the 107% time during practice.

=== Race ===
Fernando Alonso made a perfect start to the race, overtaking both Red Bulls and Hamilton into the first corner to the cheers of the Spanish fans, and leading the race until lap 18. However, Alonso faded after the first round of pitstops where Sebastian Vettel took the lead, a position which he held to the end of the race in spite of the efforts of Lewis Hamilton, who fought him all the way to the close, finishing only 0.6 seconds behind the winner, with his teammate Button over half a minute behind in third. Button had used a three-stop strategy instead of a four-stop strategy, like most other drivers, to get ahead of Webber and Alonso. On lap 31, Liuzzi's car stopped near the Pirelli tunnel due to a gearbox failure, forcing his retirement.

Mark Webber came in fourth, after spending much of the race behind Fernando Alonso, only overtaking him on the 39th lap when the Spaniard pitted. Kovalainen crashed on lap 51, damaging the left side and wheels of his car. On Lap 57, Massa, struggling with his gearbox, beached his car in the Turns 6 and 7 chicane while running tenth, his game was over. Despite starting in the pits, behind all the other cars, Nick Heidfeld had a successful race, bringing his car home in the points with an eighth-place finish. After saving a set of tyres by not setting a Q3 time, Michael Schumacher finished sixth ahead of teammate Rosberg. The race was notable for Ferrari's lack of pace on the prime tyre with Alonso slipping from first to fifth in the pit stops alone. Sergio Pérez scored his first Formula One points with ninth place, after he was disqualified from seventh place at the Australian Grand Prix.

== Classification ==
=== Qualifying ===
Pos	No	Driver	Constructor	Part 1	Part 2	Part 3	Grid
1	2	(Australia) Mark Webber	Red Bull Racing-Renault	1:23.619	1:21.773	1:20.981	1
2	1	(Germany) Sebastian Vettel	Red Bull Racing-Renault	1:24.142	1:21.540	1:21.181	2
3	3	(United Kingdom) Lewis Hamilton	McLaren-Mercedes	1:24.370	1:22.148	1:21.961	3
4	5	(Spain) Fernando Alonso	Ferrari	1:23.485	1:22.813	1:21.964	4
5	4	(United Kingdom) Jenson Button	McLaren-Mercedes	1:24.428	1:22.050	1:21.996	5
6	10	(Russia) Vitaly Petrov	Renault	1:23.069	1:22.948	1:22.471	6
7	8	(Germany) Nico Rosberg	Mercedes	1:23.507	1:22.569	1:22.599	7
8	6	(Brazil) Felipe Massa	Ferrari	1:23.506	1:23.026	1:22.888	8
9	12	(Venezuela) Pastor Maldonado	Williams-Cosworth	1:23.406	1:22.854	1:22.952	9
10	7	(Germany) Michael Schumacher	Mercedes	1:22.960	1:22.671	no time^{1}	10
11	18	(Switzerland) Sébastien Buemi	Toro Rosso-Ferrari	1:23.962	1:23.231		11
12	17	(Mexico) Sergio Pérez	Sauber-Ferrari	1:24.209	1:23.367		12
13	19	(Spain) Jaime Alguersuari	Toro Rosso-Ferrari	1:24.049	1:23.694		13
14	16	(Japan) Kamui Kobayashi	Sauber-Ferrari	1:23.656	1:23.702		14
15	20	(Finland) Heikki Kovalainen	Lotus-Renault	1:25.874	1:25.403		15
16	15	(United Kingdom) Paul di Resta	Force India-Mercedes	1:24.332	1:26.126		16
17	14	(Germany) Adrian Sutil	Force India-Mercedes	1:24.648	1:26.571		17
18	21	(Italy) Jarno Trulli	Lotus-Renault	1:26.521			18
19	11	(Brazil) Rubens Barrichello	Williams-Cosworth	1:26.910			19
20	24	(Germany) Timo Glock	Virgin-Cosworth	1:27.315			20
21	23	(Italy) Vitantonio Liuzzi	HRT-Cosworth	1:27.809			21
22	22	(India) Narain Karthikeyan	HRT-Cosworth	1:27.908			22
23	25	(Belgium) Jérôme d'Ambrosio	Virgin-Cosworth	1:28.556			23
107% time: 1:28.767
24	9	(Germany) Nick Heidfeld	Renault	no time^{2}			24

Notes:

1. – Michael Schumacher experienced a problem with his KERS device in the final period of qualifying that led to him aborting his single timed lap in Q3.
2. – Nick Heidfeld's Renault R31 caught fire in the final practice session on Saturday morning, seriously damaging the exhaust system and floor of the car. Renault mechanics were unable to get the car repaired in time for the first qualifying session, meaning Heidfeld was unable to set a lap time. As he had demonstrated competitive lap times during free practice sessions, he was permitted to start the race, which he did from the back of the grid.

=== Race ===
Pos	No	Driver	Constructor	Laps	Time/Retired	Grid	Points
1	1	(Germany) Sebastian Vettel	Red Bull Racing-Renault	66	1:39:03.301	2	25
2	3	(United Kingdom) Lewis Hamilton	McLaren-Mercedes	66	+0.630	3	18
3	4	(United Kingdom) Jenson Button	McLaren-Mercedes	66	+35.697	5	15
4	2	(Australia) Mark Webber	Red Bull Racing-Renault	66	+47.966	1	12
5	5	(Spain) Fernando Alonso	Ferrari	65	+1 Lap	4	10
6	7	(Germany) Michael Schumacher	Mercedes	65	+1 Lap	10	8
7	8	(Germany) Nico Rosberg	Mercedes	65	+1 Lap	7	6
8	9	(Germany) Nick Heidfeld	Renault	65	+1 Lap	24	4
9	17	(Mexico) Sergio Pérez	Sauber-Ferrari	65	+1 Lap	12	2
10	16	(Japan) Kamui Kobayashi	Sauber-Ferrari	65	+1 Lap	14	1
11	10	(Russia) Vitaly Petrov	Renault	65	+1 Lap	6	
12	15	(United Kingdom) Paul di Resta	Force India-Mercedes	65	+1 Lap	16	
13	14	(Germany) Adrian Sutil	Force India-Mercedes	65	+1 Lap	17	
14	18	(Switzerland) Sébastien Buemi	Toro Rosso-Ferrari	65	+1 Lap	11	
15	12	(Venezuela) Pastor Maldonado	Williams-Cosworth	65	+1 Lap	9	
16	19	(Spain) Jaime Alguersuari	Toro Rosso-Ferrari	64	+2 Laps	13	
17	11	(Brazil) Rubens Barrichello	Williams-Cosworth	64	+2 Laps	19	
18	21	(Italy) Jarno Trulli	Lotus-Renault	64	+2 Laps	18	
19	24	(Germany) Timo Glock	Virgin-Cosworth	63	+3 Laps	20	
20	25	(Belgium) Jérôme d'Ambrosio	Virgin-Cosworth	62	+4 Laps	23	
21	22	(India) Narain Karthikeyan	HRT-Cosworth	61	+5 Laps	22	
Ret	6	(Brazil) Felipe Massa	Ferrari	58	Gearbox	8	
Ret	20	(Finland) Heikki Kovalainen	Lotus-Renault	48	Accident	15	
Ret	23	(Italy) Vitantonio Liuzzi	HRT-Cosworth	28	Gearbox	21	

== Championship standings after the race ==
Drivers' Championship standings

Pos.	Driver	Points
1	(Germany) Sebastian Vettel	118
2	(United Kingdom) Lewis Hamilton	77
3	(Australia) Mark Webber	67
4	(United Kingdom) Jenson Button	61
5	(Spain) Fernando Alonso	51

Constructors' Championship standings

Pos.	Constructor	Points
1	(Austria) Red Bull Racing-Renault	185
2	(United Kingdom) McLaren-Mercedes	138
3	(Italy) Ferrari	75
4	(United Kingdom) Renault	46
5	(Germany) Mercedes	40

- Note: Only the top five positions are included for both sets of standings.

== See also ==
- 2011 Catalunya GP2 Series round
- 2011 Catalunya GP3 Series round

Previous race: 2011 Turkish Grand Prix	FIA Formula One World Championship; 2011 season	Next race: 2011 Monaco Grand Prix
Previous race: 2010 Spanish Grand Prix	Spanish Grand Prix	Next race: 2012 Spanish Grand Prix
