= Virgin Racing =

Former Anglo-Russian Formula One constructor

Virgin
- Full name: Virgin Racing (2010); Marussia Virgin Racing (2011)
- Base: Dinnington, South Yorkshire, United Kingdom
- Noted staff: John Booth; Richard Branson; Nikolai Fomenko; Graeme Lowdon; Pat Symonds; Mark Hendy; Alex Tai; Etienne de Villiers; Nick Wirth
- Noted drivers: (Belgium) Jérôme d'Ambrosio (Brazil) Lucas di Grassi (Germany) Timo Glock
- Next name: Marussia F1 Team

Formula One World Championship career
- First entry: 2010 Bahrain Grand Prix
- Races entered: 38
- Engines: Cosworth
- Constructors' Championships: 0
- Drivers' Championships: 0
- Race victories: 0
- Podiums: 0
- Points: 0
- Pole positions: 0
- Fastest laps: 0
- Final entry: 2011 Brazilian Grand Prix

Virgin Racing (subsequently Marussia Virgin Racing) was a Formula One racing team which was under management of Manor Motorsport, Wirth Research and Richard Branson's Virgin Group and competed in 2010 with a British licence and in 2011 with a Russian licence. It scored no points and finished last in the Constructor's Championship for the two years the team competed.

The team was one of the four granted an entry for the 2010 season, and was originally known as Manor Grand Prix, before being renamed Virgin Racing when Virgin bought a shareholding and naming rights at the end of 2009. The team's original car, the Virgin VR-01, was the first in Formula One to be developed using only computational fluid dynamics, and was driven by Timo Glock and Lucas di Grassi. At the end of the season, Marussia Motors bought a stake in the team and became the main sponsor, with the team known as Marussia Virgin Racing. The partnership with Wirth ended midway through 2011, and a new technical structure bringing car development in-house was set up for 2012.

Marussia Virgin Racing was renamed to Marussia F1 Team at the end of 2011. The company retained its base in Dinnington, South Yorkshire as well as setting up the technical base in Banbury, Oxfordshire for the construction of the racing cars.

== History ==
=== Formation ===
In February 2009, Richard Branson's Virgin organisation was reportedly bidding for the former Honda Racing F1 Team. Branson later stated an interest in Formula One, but claimed the sport needed to develop a more economically efficient and environmentally responsible image. Virgin later sponsored the new Brawn GP for 2009.

The team was formed as Manor Grand Prix as a tie-up between Manor Motorsport and Wirth Research. Initially, Alex Tai was appointed team principal, Graeme Lowdon as director of racing, Manor Motorsport boss John Booth as sporting director and former Simtek team owner Nick Wirth as technical director. Booth said: "I was introduced to Nick back in March 2009 when the budget cap concept was introduced. There was going to be £30 million TV money, that was going to be the cost of the season and it all sounded like a great idea."

The team was meeting prospective sponsors for 2010 at the 2009 British Grand Prix weekend, at a time when Formula One faced a split amid commercial acrimony and the threat of breakaway championships. Against that landscape, the new teams were very much needed as an insurance policy by the sport's power brokers. But, once it was obvious that a breakaway was no more likely than at any other time during the previous 30 years, that was not quite so true. There would be no performance breaks for the newcomers, as promised, and the question was whether or not to continue. They ultimately decided to continue but within the financial framework they had decided on for the old regulations - and could only do that because of Nick Wirth's computational fluid dynamics (CFD) capability.

With Mercedes-Benz purchasing Brawn GP at the end of the 2009 season, Branson invested in an 80% buyout of Manor Grand Prix, with the team being renamed Virgin Racing. Less than one month after the Virgin partnership was officially launched, Tai left his position and Booth took over as team principal, with Lowdon becoming the CEO.

Virgin Racing were based on a three-way partnership between Manor Motorsport, which ran the cars, Wirth Research, which designed them and Virgin which handled commercial operations. Car preparation and racing operations were run from its headquarters in Dinnington, South Yorkshire, while Wirth Research designed, developed and built the Virgin VR-01 from its base in Bicester, Oxfordshire before announcing a relocation to new, larger premises in Banbury, Oxfordshire in July 2010.

Virgin Racing had the lowest operating budget of all the teams in 2010 of £40 million. Branson said, "Money's not everything. They are determined to prove that via engineering prowess, great drivers and a great affinity with the public they can do well."

The team also had plans to create a driver academy, a series of racing teams starting in the new GP3 Series and advancing all the way up to Formula One.

== 2010 season ==
=== Pre-season ===
On 17 November 2009 it was announced by the team that former Toyota driver Timo Glock would be the team's lead driver for the 2010 season. It seemed as though Glock would partner Polish driver Robert Kubica at Renault, but following Renault's uncertainty over whether it would take part in Formula One for 2010, Glock chose an option where he would be guaranteed a drive, even though the car might have been less competitive. Glock was signed for two years with a one-year extension offer. He was partnered by Brazilian GP2 Series regular Lucas di Grassi. It was reported by The Daily Telegraph that di Grassi had also provided Virgin with £5 million worth of sponsorship. An important factor in his decision was the chance to work with team principal John Booth.

Technical director Nick Wirth took the decision to use only CFD to develop the aerodynamics, with no reference to a wind tunnel. Booth said, "My prediction is that wind tunnels will be a thing of the past and by the time Malaysia1 (Lotus Racing) get theirs built, they will be redundant. When you look at the pace of development, particularly in the front wing area, there's no way that can be done in a wind tunnel -- there's not enough hours in the day. People will start splitting the resource much more towards CFD." Later upgrades to the VR-01 seemed to vindicate that decision

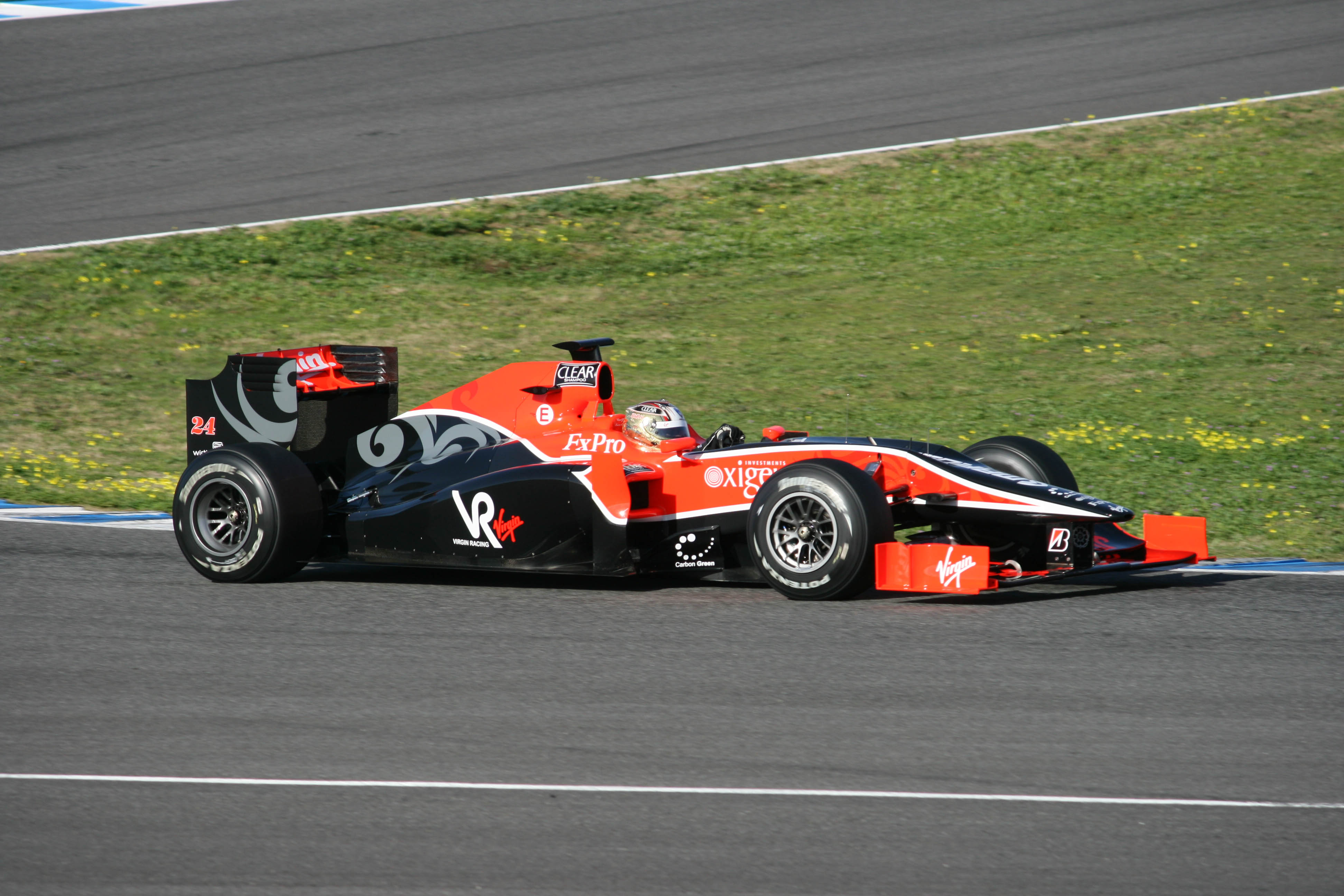
Timo Glock testing the Virgin VR-01 during pre-season testing in Jerez, in February 2010.

The VR-01 was officially launched on the team's website on 3 February 2010. The car passed its mandatory FIA crash tests, and completed its first track run at Silverstone on 4 February in the hands of Glock. It tested with other teams for the first time at the group test at Jerez from 10 to 13 February. On the first day, Glock completed five laps of the track during wet weather conditions. On the second day, he completed eleven laps before the car's front wing failed; the team had to abandon the day's running due to a shortage of spare parts. Virgin modified the front wing mounting of the VR-01 ahead of the third day's running in Jerez, where di Grassi ran the Virgin for the first time. The following test was plagued by weather conditions and the car suffered a hydraulic problem on the first test day and Glock only managed 10 laps. On the next day Glock notched up 72 laps for the car and had no mechanical problems, however the weather was still wet. Di Grassi took over for the remaining two days of the test. Technical director Wirth said that the hydraulic problem was solved and the car had not suffered any big glitches. The problem recurred, however, at the final pre-season testing session held in Barcelona, costing the team further track time and necessitating a further redesign of the relevant components ahead of the season-opening Bahrain Grand Prix.

During the first practice session in Bahrain, both Virgin cars were plagued by mechanical issues. Di Grassi could only manage a couple of installation laps whilst Glock was able to coax his car to a 2:03.680, about seven seconds behind the fastest time. In Qualifying, di Grassi was able to head the two Hispanias by just under three seconds with a 2:00.587, two tenths behind Lotus’ Heikki Kovalainen, who qualified 21st. Glock took an impressive 19th, pipping Jarno Trulli in the other Lotus to be the highest placed driver of the new teams. However the race did not go well, with di Grassi retiring on lap 3 due to a hydraulic issue while Glock lost both 3rd and 5th gears, ultimately retiring. Although the VR-01 seemed quicker, both Lotus T127s were classified in the race, the only one of the new teams to achieve this. John Booth commented, "Everything connected with the hydraulics was such high pressure that the smallest impurity, crack or fault was a car stopper because it controls four or five major components,"

It had been reported by Auto, Motor und Sport that the VR-01's fuel tank was too small for the car to finish a race, and that the team applied to the FIA in order to obtain permission to modify the chassis to accommodate a larger tank. This was later clarified to mean that the car would struggle to complete races with a heavy rate of fuel consumption.

For the Australian Grand Prix, Virgin Racing were granted permission from the FIA to change the size of their car's fuel tanks because their capacity was not large enough for their drivers to complete a Grand Prix at full speed. The revised chassis, with a longer underbody, engine cover and other bodywork changes, was expected to be introduced at the Spanish Grand Prix. Both cars started from the pit lane after replacing the fuel collectors on their cars when issues in qualifying forced them to run with more fuel than would be ideal On lap 5, Schumacher attempted to pass di Grassi for 19th position but di Grassi managed to retake the position from Schumacher by driving around the outside of Ascari corner, but Schumacher got ahead of di Grassi on the pit straight. Di Grassi drove to his garage to retire with an issue with his car's hydraulics on lap 29, while on the 45th lap, Glock made a pit stop and his mechanics retired him from the race because a camber shim on his car was loose and it caused the left rear suspension to move around. Virgin had yet to finish a race, while Hispania scooped up a 14th, which would become costly for Virgin at the end of the season.

In Malaysia, di Grassi overtook rivals Lotus and Hispania to finish 14th. It was Virgin and di Grassi's first ever finish in Formula One, albeit on fuel conservation mode.

Virgin's solution to their problem of a small fuel tank was to bring a longer chassis to the Spanish Grand Prix, which would accommodate a larger fuel tank and a brand-new fuel feed system that would allow them to run as light as possible during qualifying. The VR-01 was also given a "shark fin" engine cowling. However, owing to the 2010 eruptions of Eyjafjallajökull in Iceland that had disrupted air travel across Europe, only one of the newly developed chassis was able to make it to Barcelona, to be used by Glock. In practice, Virgin were given a penalty after the team failed to notify the FIA of changes to their gear ratios before the deadline. Glock and di Grassi qualified 22nd and 23rd, and Virgin scored their first ever double finish with 18th and 19th, the last of the finishers, although di Grassi battled with car setup and was the last driver to finish the race.

Virgin finally brought a big update to the car for the Britain. They qualified ahead of both Hispanias and split the Lotuses. However, di Grassi retired with hydraulic failure on lap 9. Glock had a simple race and was within sight of the Lotuses when he crossed the finish line, ahead of both Hispanias

Di Grassi had impressed the Virgin engineers with his feedback but John Booth had not been satisfied with his pace against Glock and scouted an alternative driver. This resulted in Booth coming into contact with Belgian driver Jérôme d'Ambrosio. D’Ambrosio became the new Virgin reserve driver, and was handed di Grassi's car in the first Singapore practice session. D’Ambrosio ended the session just over 0.2 seconds behind Glock

At the Japanese Grand Prix, di Grassi out-qualified Glock, but had a heavy accident on the way to the grid. He left the track at the entrance to 130R, fishtailing wildly, spinning out across the run-off area and hitting the wall. Glock, on the other hand, finished a strong 14th, ahead of both Hispanias but behind both Lotuses.

In South Korea, di Grassi lost control of his car while trying to overtake the Hispania of Sakon Yamamoto and crashed into the barriers on the 26th lap. Glock was heading for 12th place after starting in 20th in very wet conditions. This 12th place would have brought Virgin up to 10th in the constructors' championship, since none of the other two new teams had finished that high. On lap thirty-one, Sébastien Buemi tried to pass Glock on the outside heading into turn 3 but lost control of his car under braking and rammed into the side of Glock. Glock drove back to his pit box where his mechanics examined his car for damage and decided to retire him from the race. This ruined Virgin's chances of finishing 10th in the constructors’ championship.

In November 2010, Bernie Ecclestone said of the three new teams "They do nothing for us, they are an embarrassment. We need to get rid of a few of those cripples." He also said "Richard [Branson] should put some money in there shouldn't he? He could do what Dietrich (Mateschitz, owner of Red Bull) has done and put some money in". John Booth said that it was unfair to suggest Branson should put more money into the team, saying how "he was very brave joining a start-up operation that might have gone horribly wrong and he's been supportive throughout and brought us new backers".

At the season-ending Abu Dhabi Grand Prix, di Grassi commented "We had to do more than 50 laps with the same set of tyres, which seemed like a difficult task, but we managed it. I am ending the year with a feeling of ‘mission accomplished’”. Hispania managed to pick up some 15th places in Singapore and Japan, and along with Virgin's unreliability at the start and not finishing 12th in Korea meant Hispania finished ahead of them in the constructors championship, despite having a slower car.

On 16 December 2009, Tony Fernandes, owner of Air Asia and the Lotus team accepted a "challenge" from Richard Branson. The losing team's boss would work on the winner's airline for a day dressed as a stewardess. Fernandes won the bet. He later joked "The sexier the better. Our passengers will be delighted to be served by a Knight of the Realm, but knowing Richard, the real challenge will be to prevent him from asking our guests 'coffee, tea or me?' That would be scary." In addition, the team produced a poster depicting Branson in an Air Asia uniform. However, the date of the flight was delayed several times: first because of Branson breaking his leg, then because of the 2011 royal wedding, finally because of a fire at Branson's home on Necker Island. Branson ultimately honoured the bet on 13 May 2013.

On 11 November 2010, Marussia acquired a controlling stake in the team and guaranteed the team's future until 2014. Marussia engineering director Nikolai Fomenko stated that the team would race with a Russian licence in 2011, becoming the second Russian team in the sport after Midland. Director Nick Wirth announced that it was a major financial boost for the team and that it will allow it to promote Formula One in Russia. The team also announced that their CFD facility would be upgraded, to become the third largest such facility in the world.

The Marussia sponsored team logo used during the 2011 season.

== 2011 season ==
The Virgin MVR-02 followed the VR-01's design principle of exclusively using CFD instead of the more traditional windtunnel approach. The car did not use KERS; chief designer Wirth commented that the gains offered by the system did not justify the expense in developing it. Instead, the team concentrated on improving the car's hydraulics and gearbox, both of which had been the frequent source of problems in 2010. After being forced to re-design the VR-01 when it was discovered the fuel tank was not large enough to finish races with a high fuel consumption, the MVR-02 was designed to be the same length as the original VR-01 chassis whilst retaining the full-size fuel tank. The air intake on the front of the nose was designed to resemble the one on Marussia's road car, the Marussia B2.

Having previously driven for the team during Friday practice sessions at selected events in 2010, Jérôme d'Ambrosio replaced Lucas di Grassi in the team's second seat alongside Timo Glock for the 2011 season.

Virgin first entered the MVR-02 at the 2011 Australian Grand Prix. The car was performing poorly due to the condition of the track and speculation rose up that Virgin was not going to be able to race. But Glock and d'Ambrosio qualified, at the rear of the grid. Early in the race, Glock was forced to make a lengthy stop in the garage due to a mechanical failure. As a result, Glock completed less than 90% of the race distance and although the car was running at the end of the race he was not classified in the standings. D'Ambrosio finished 16th on the track, but the disqualification of both Sauber cars bumped him up to 14th.

At the Malaysian Grand Prix, Virgin yet again qualified at the back of the grid, and d'Ambrosio retired due to electronic problems. Glock finished 16th, his first classified finish of the season.

For the Turkish Grand Prix the team applied their first upgrade to the car. Glock was given an "extreme" update, while d'Ambrosio had to wait until the Spanish Grand Prix. Despite this, d'Ambrosio was faster than Glock for the whole weekend. Glock's pit crew noticed a mechanical fault and set to correct it. However, the repair proved so drawn out that Glock ended up not racing. D'Ambrosio finished 20th.

In June 2011, the team announced that they had ended their relationship with technical partner Wirth and his company, Wirth Research, who designed their 2010 and 2011 cars. This came after a lengthy internal review led by former Renault engineering director Pat Symonds found that the team's CFD-only approach had not yielded the expected results. They soon entered a partnership with McLaren Applied Technologies ahead of the 2012 season.

In Germany the two cars qualified 20th and 22nd on the grid, with Glock ahead of d'Ambrosio. Glock commented to his engineers on the radio that they were making it "difficult for him". Glock later tried to cover up his comments by saying they were meant in a joking way. Glock announced the following day that he would be staying with the team until 2014. The two cars finished the race in the same order, but in 17th and 18th places. The MVR-02s sandwiched the HRTs in Hungary, having qualified in 21st and 24th places. Glock finished the race of mixed weather conditions 17th with d'Ambrosio 19th.

Despite out-qualifying and out-racing HRT, the Italian Grand Prix was quite disappointing for the MVR-02. Qualifying on the penultimate row, d'Ambrosio suffered a gearbox failure on lap 1, and although Glock managed one of the team's best results of the year with a 15th-place finish, this was last of the finishing cars.

At the first ever Indian Grand Prix, the cars set the two slowest times in qualifying, with d'Ambrosio the faster of the two teammates inside the 107% rule time, and Glock nearly two seconds outside of it. Glock was allowed to start the race because he set competitive times in practice. The two HRT cars were given penalties, so the cars started on the penultimate row instead. The race was short-lived for Glock, who retired after just two laps after being run into by Kamui Kobayashi. D'Ambrosio finished 16th, ahead of the two HRTs and Jarno Trulli.

In November 2011, Virgin applied to the Formula One commission to formally change their constructor name for 2012 from Virgin to Marussia, to reflect their new ownership. Permission was granted before being formally ratified at a meeting of the FIA World Motor Sport Council. On 31 December 2011, Marussia Virgin Racing announced they were now called Marussia F1 Team. Virgin announced that they would be staying with the team, its logos would feature on the 2012 car. By 29 September 2011, Marussia already had a 60% scale model of their 2012 car ready for use in the McLaren wind tunnel. The team received its first parts for the car in December 2011.

=== Sponsorship ===
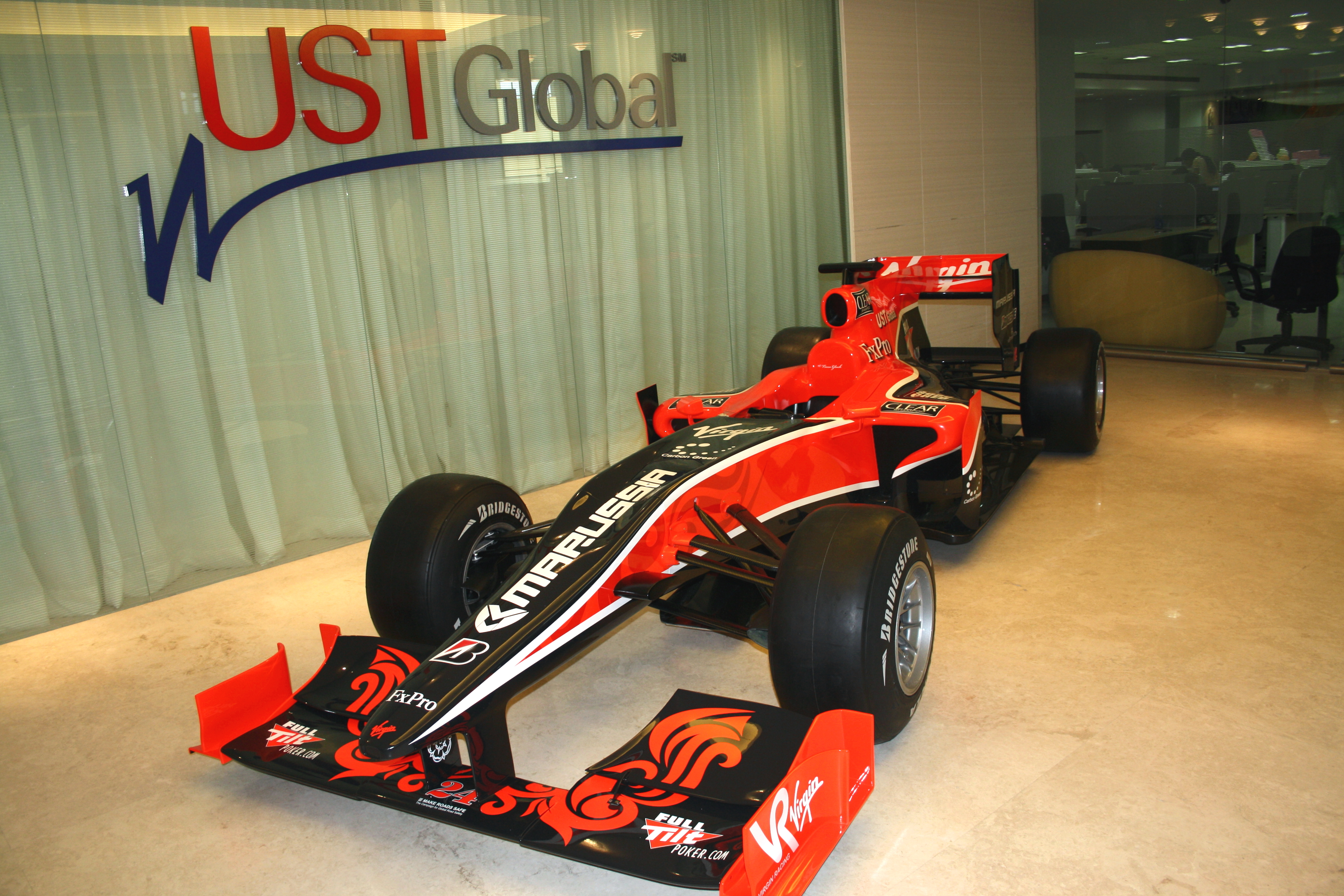
Timo Glock's VR-01 on display in partner UST Global's Trivandrum office.

Virgin purchased 20% of the team, as part of sponsorship arrangement. The official FIA entry list for 2010 announced on 30 November 2009 showed that Manor GP had been entered as Virgin Racing. The team's partners for 2010 include tyre supplier Bridgestone, IT services company UST Global, environmental technology company Carbon Green, shampoo brand Clear, information technology firm CSC, foreign exchange traders FxPro, clothing company Kappa, the Oxygen investment group and Russian sports car manufacturer Marussia. On 13 January 2010, reports emerged revealing that Virgin had paid an extra £1.5 million to Cosworth to have the CA2010 unit rebranded as a Marussia, though both Virgin Racing and Cosworth have denied the story.

On 14 December 2009, Lloyds Banking Group announced that it had invested £10 million in the team, reversing the recent trend of financial institutions such as ING and RBS withdrawing sponsorship. On 7 May 2010, Virgin Racing announced that it had reached a sponsorship deal with Full Tilt Poker.

=== Partnerships ===
Since the team was formed, it had been in a partnership with Russian car manufacturer Marussia and QNet since 2010. On 11 November 2010, Marussia acquired a controlling stake in the team and guaranteed the team's future until 2014. Marussia engineering director Nikolai Fomenko has stated that the team would race with a Russian licence in 2011. Director Nick Wirth announced that it was a major financial boost for the team and that it will allow it to promote Formula One in Russia. The team also announced that their computational fluid dynamics (CFD) facility would be upgraded, to become the third largest such facility in the world.

Having previously driven for the team during Friday practice sessions at selected events in 2010, Jérôme d'Ambrosio replaced Lucas di Grassi in the team's second seat alongside Timo Glock for the 2011 season. Following a disappointing start to the season, the team ended its partnership with Wirth Research. The team retained Pat Symonds as a technical consultant, though he could not be employed directly until his ban expired over his role in the 2008 Singapore Grand Prix race fixing at the end of the 2013 season. The team has abandoned using CFD as its sole R&D tool and signed an agreement with McLaren to use their technical facilities, simulators and wind tunnel.

== Complete Formula One results ==
(key) (results in bold indicate pole position; races in italics indicate fastest lap)

Year	Chassis	Engine	Tyres	Drivers	1	2	3	4	5	6	7	8	9	10	11	12	13	14	15	16	17	18	19	Points	WCC
2010	VR-01	Cosworth CA2010 2.4 V8	B		BHR	AUS	MAL	CHN	ESP	MON	TUR	CAN	EUR	GBR	GER	HUN	BEL	ITA	SIN	JPN	KOR	BRA	ABU	0	12th
2010	VR-01	Cosworth CA2010 2.4 V8	B	(Germany) Timo Glock	Ret	Ret	Ret	DNS	18	Ret	18	Ret	19	19	18	16	18	17	Ret	14	Ret	20	Ret	0	12th
2010	VR-01	Cosworth CA2010 2.4 V8	B	(Brazil) Lucas di Grassi	Ret	Ret	14	Ret	19	Ret	19	19	17	Ret	Ret	18	17	20^{†}	15	DNS	Ret	NC	18	0	12th
2011	MVR-02	Cosworth CA2011 2.4 V8	P		AUS	MAL	CHN	TUR	ESP	MON	CAN	EUR	GBR	GER	HUN	BEL	ITA	SIN	JPN	KOR	IND	ABU	BRA	0	12th
2011	MVR-02	Cosworth CA2011 2.4 V8	P	(Germany) Timo Glock	NC	16	21	DNS	19	Ret	15	21	16	17	17	18	15	Ret	20	18	Ret	19	Ret	0	12th
2011	MVR-02	Cosworth CA2011 2.4 V8	P	(Belgium) Jérôme d'Ambrosio	14	Ret	20	20	20	15	14	22	17	18	19	17	Ret	18	21	20	16	Ret	19	0	12th

Notes

- ^{†} – The driver did not finish the Grand Prix, but was classified as he completed over 90% of the race distance.
