= 2010 Monaco Grand Prix =

Coordinates: 43°44′4.74″N 7°25′16.8″E

Race 6 of 19 in the 2010 Formula One World Championship
← Previous race	Next race →
- Circuit de Monaco

Race details
- Date: 16 May 2010
- Official name: Formula 1 Grand Prix de Monaco 2010
- Location: Circuit de Monaco
- Course: Street circuit
- Course length: 3.34 km (2.08 miles)
- Distance: 78 laps, 260.52 km (162.24 miles)
- Weather: Mainly cloudy, dry

Pole position
Driver	(Australia) Mark Webber	Red Bull-Renault
- Time: 1:13.826

Fastest lap
Driver	(Germany) Sebastian Vettel	Red Bull-Renault
- Time: 1:15.192 on lap 71

Podium
First	(Australia) Mark Webber	Red Bull-Renault
Second	(Germany) Sebastian Vettel	Red Bull-Renault
Third	(Poland) Robert Kubica	Renault

The 2010 Monaco Grand Prix (officially the Formula 1 Grand Prix de Monaco 2010) was the sixth round of the 2010 Formula One season. It was held in the streets of Monaco on 16 May 2010 and was won by Red Bull's Mark Webber.

== Report ==
=== Background ===
Reigning World Champion and 2009 race winner Jenson Button went into the Monte Carlo round with a three-point lead over Ferrari's Fernando Alonso and a ten-point margin over Sebastian Vettel. In total, seven drivers were in a position to take the lead of the championship had they won in the Principality.

Following concerns over the tight and narrow nature of the circuit combined with new teams Virgin Racing, Lotus and Hispania being between three and six seconds slower than the established teams over the course of a lap and therefore creating a very real possibility for a slower car compromising the flying laps of their faster counterparts, the suggestion was put forth to split the first session of qualifying into two groups of twelve cars, similar to the format used by the IndyCar Series. However, at the Spanish Grand Prix, one week before the Monaco race, the proposal was rejected by several teams. The FIA later set a maximum allowable lap time for qualifying, with any car that is slower than one minute and twenty-two seconds between the first and last corners facing penalties from the stewards. The concerns over slow traffic attracted criticism, with 1982 World Champion Keke Rosberg saying "there used to be twenty-six drivers out there in the old days, and half of them were slow – not just half a dozen!", while Lotus Racing's Jarno Trulli said that he felt drivers and teams have no cause for complaint if anyone is held up, saying "they have had plenty of time among the teams about what to do for here [Monaco], and they didn't come up with a solution. So I don't think anyone should start complaining now."

Several small changes were made to the circuit prior to the race. These include the raising of kerbs on the exit of the Nouvelle Chicane and in the second half of the Swimming Pool complex, as a deterrent to cars cutting the chicanes. The new kerbs were clearly visible in the new yellow colour. Several sections of the circuit, including the pit lane and the northern half of the circuit from the Place du Casino to the tunnel have been re-surfaced.

Bruno Senna had damaged his Hispania F110 during practice for the race in Barcelona. As his team was unable to find the flaw in the chassis, he competed in Monaco with a damaged car, producing lap times two seconds slower than his team-mate Karun Chandhok in free practice.

=== Free practice ===
The first practice sessions were held on the Thursday of race week, as is traditional in Monaco. Fernando Alonso was the fastest driver and the only man to break the 1 min 16 sec barrier, though second-placed Sebastian Vettel set a time of 1:16 even, with Renault's Robert Kubica one hundredth of a second behind him. Virgin's Timo Glock was the fastest of the new teams, three and a half seconds slower than Alonso and one second behind Kamui Kobayashi, the last of the drivers for an established team. The first session was incident-free with the exception of Karun Chandhok stopping on the circuit after completing just six laps when he brushed the barriers and spun at Massanet. Kobayashi also encountered trouble, running over the chicanes at the entry to the Swimming Pool and finding the barriers. Alonso was also sighted pitting for a replacement front wing.

The second practice session was considered wet, though the rain was not heavy enough to justify the use of the intermediate tyres. Alonso once again topped the session, this time breaking the 1 min 15 sec barrier with Nico Rosberg and Vettel rounding out the top three. Lotus' Heikki Kovalainen was the fastest of the new teams, one second adrift of Jaime Alguersuari in eighteenth position. There were no major incidents, though the anticipated traffic problem manifested on several occasions, with the Ferrari of Felipe Massa impeding Kovalainen and his Lotus as the Finn was completing a flying lap.

The third practice session opened with a heavy accident by Alonso, the Spaniard crashing his Ferrari at Massanet after completing just six laps; his fastest recorded time for the session would ultimately be enough for sixteenth. Virgin's Timo Glock also stopped with hydraulics issues after a sequence of installation laps and failing to set a time. Renault's Kubica was the fastest of the session, edging out Alonso's Ferrari team-mate Massa by four hundredths of a second and Spanish Grand Prix winner Mark Webber third. At the end of the session, just half a second covered the top seven drivers. Lotus was once again the fastest rookie team, with Heikki Kovalainen just a tenth of a second quicker than team-mate Trulli.

=== Qualifying ===
Following the practice session, Ferrari judged the damage to Alonso's car to be too extensive to repair in time for qualifying. This forced the double World Champion to revert to the team's spare chassis for the race and start from pit lane.

With Alonso out, several teams – notably Renault – sent their drivers out on the harder compound tyres, and the remaining six drivers to be eliminated were the six drivers for the new teams. Heikki Kovalainen was the fastest of them; it was the first time team-mate Jarno Trulli was out-qualified at Monaco by his team-mate. The Lotus cars were followed by the two Virgins and the two Hispanias. Despite his damaged car, Bruno Senna out-qualified Karun Chandhok. The anticipated traffic problems did not arise, and Felipe Massa set the fastest time of the session.

The second session was marked by an accident in the final few minutes, with Vitaly Petrov slipping into the tyre wall at Ste. Devote, though the session was not stopped. His time was fast enough for fourteenth although Nico Hülkenberg, Adrian Sutil and Sébastien Buemi all qualified ahead of Petrov, with Pedro de la Rosa, Kamui Kobayashi and Jaime Alguersuari also being eliminated. Mercedes' Nico Rosberg was the fastest man in the session.

The third and final part of qualifying was led by Robert Kubica for over half the session, a whole second ahead of the opposition, before Mark Webber managed to set a lap time of 1:13.826 to steal pole position away from him and continue Red Bull's unbroken run of pole positions with their sixth-straight start from pole. Kubica qualified in second place, with Sebastian Vettel taking third ahead of Felipe Massa. Lewis Hamilton qualified fifth ahead of Nico Rosberg and Michael Schumacher; team principal Ross Brawn later expressed frustrations by a mistake by the team that saw Rosberg inadvertently block his team-mate. Jenson Button, Rubens Barrichello and Vitantonio Liuzzi completed the top ten.

=== Race ===
At the start, Kubica attempted to block Vettel and protect second place, but the German driver held his line into Ste. Devote and won the position. Rubens Barrichello was the big winner, managing to forge through to sixth place, while Schumacher overtook his team-mate. The first lap saw Nico Hülkenberg crash in the tunnel when a front wing mounting failed. A problem with his clutch had previously forced him to abort his warm-up lap and line up at the back of the grid, and his accident triggered a safety car period that lasted for several laps, and Fernando Alonso took the opportunity to pit early, swapping his super-soft tyres in favour of the harder compound. It was a move that would dictate most strategies up and down the pit lane given that every car was planning on stopping just once. Reigning World Champion and 2009 winner Jenson Button was the race's second retirement with an overheating engine – the result of a bung being left in an air intake on the grid by an engineer – ending his day on the second lap. He also parked his car on the exit to the pit lane, meaning Bruno Senna had to cross the yellow line to avoid the McLaren after completing his pitstop, due to this he did not receive a penalty.

The first round of stops began earlier than anticipated, with the majority of teams and drivers attempting to time their stops in such a way that they would come out ahead of Alonso's Ferrari. Nico Rosberg was the exception to the rule, preferring instead to stay out in an attempt to open a buffer between himself and the Spaniard. The gamble did not pay off, however, as Rosberg eventually emerged from the pits to find himself behind Alonso and a train of cars that had exited from the pits immediately in front of him. While pit strategy dictated the running order, both Saubers and both Virgins retired from the race.

As Webber began to solidify his lead, Rubens Barrichello suffered a suspension failure due to a loose drain cover at the top of Beau Rivage, and the Brazilian's out-of-control Williams hit the barrier and spun around, coming to a halt facing the wrong way in the middle of the track at Massanet. Karun Chandhok then ran over Barrichello's discarded steering wheel, which he had thrown out of the car after the crash. The safety car was deployed for the second time, bunching the field back up. Webber survived the restarts with his lead intact, though the safety car would again take control of the race a few laps later. A marshal at Massanet reported that a manhole cover had come loose, and with the pressure generated by a speeding Formula One car being more than enough to rip it free of its mountings, race control deployed the safety car while the situation could be assessed. It was decided that the cover was safe, and the race resumed within three laps of the safety car taking to the circuit. It was later discovered that the loose manhole cover had been the cause of Barrichello's accident, being lifted up as the car passed over it, striking the left rear wheel and breaking the suspension.

Bruno Senna and Heikki Kovalainen joined the growing list of retirements, both exiting the race on the same lap with mechanical troubles. The safety car would again be deployed during the 75th lap and remain in place until the race's final corner when Jarno Trulli and Hispania's Karun Chandhok collided. Trulli attempted a pass at Rascasse that resulted in his Lotus mounting Chandhok's car and his wheels narrowly missing Chandhok's head. Both drivers walked away from the crash. The incident occurred just in front of race leader Webber, who avoided being caught up in the tangle. Webber went on to win a race with all but a few seconds of the last few laps run under safety car conditions during which Vitaly Petrov retired his Renault with brake problems.

During the eight or nine seconds between Webber crossing the safety car line, with the green restart lights illuminated, and Webber finishing the race, Schumacher overtook Alonso in the final corner for sixth place to finish 5.7 seconds behind the winner. The rule 40.7 states that after the safety car has returned to the pitlane, drivers may only overtake once they have passed the white safety car line spanning the width of the circuit; in Monaco, this line is at the exit to Rascasse. Replays showing Schumacher's manoeuvre were shown shortly after the race and controversy started with Ferrari claiming that overtaking on the last lap was not permitted, according to rule 40.13, which states: "If the race ends whilst the safety car is deployed it will enter the pit lane at the end of the last lap and the cars will take the chequered flag as normal without overtaking." Mercedes principal Ross Brawn produced documents to show that the restart had taken place (thus the 40.13 rule was not applicable in his opinion) and Schumacher's position beyond the safety car line before the overtaking.

=== Post-race ===
The stewards, including 1996 champion Damon Hill, held an enquiry after the race, and gave Schumacher a 20-second penalty for illegally passing Alonso, demoting him to 12th position. Mercedes announced its intention to appeal against the decision, although the penalty cannot be rescinded as it is classed as a drive-through penalty, a type of penalty which is not open to appeal. The team later chose not to pursue an appeal after the FIA agreed to hold talks on the subject of the safety car rules. The FIA later admitted that the rules suffered from a "lack of clarity" and sought to change the rules in order to clarify the regulations and make it easier for teams to understand exactly what was required of them in such a scenario.

The safety car rule in Formula One is unique compared to other sanctioning bodies of motorsport in regards to last-lap yellow chequer finishes. Most sanctioning bodies require the safety car to lead the leader across the finish line on the final lap in case of a yellow chequer. In Formula One, the safety car does not lead the leader across the finish line on the last lap.

Webber's victory meant that he was the first Australian to win the Monaco Grand Prix since Jack Brabham in 1959. Webber also took the lead in the championship on seventy-eight points, the same amount as his team-mate Sebastian Vettel (however, with two wins so far during the season to Vettel's one, Webber was still classified as sole championship leader). Alonso's sixth-place finish saw him dropping down to third in the standings, just ahead of the non-finishing Button. Red Bull's one-two finish also meant that they leap-frogged Ferrari in the constructors' standings, establishing a twenty-two point lead. Combined with Button's retirement, Lewis Hamilton's fifth place meant that McLaren fell from first to third overall.

== Classification ==
=== Qualifying ===
Pos	No	Driver	Constructor	Part 1	Part 2	Part 3	Grid
1	6	(Australia) Mark Webber	Red Bull-Renault	1:15.035	1:14.462	1:13.826	1
2	11	(Poland) Robert Kubica	Renault	1:15.045	1:14.549	1:14.120	2
3	5	(Germany) Sebastian Vettel	Red Bull-Renault	1:15.110	1:14.568	1:14.227	3
4	7	(Brazil) Felipe Massa	Ferrari	1:14.757	1:14.405	1:14.283	4
5	2	(United Kingdom) Lewis Hamilton	McLaren-Mercedes	1:15.676	1:14.527	1:14.432	5
6	4	(Germany) Nico Rosberg	Mercedes	1:15.188	1:14.375	1:14.544	6
7	3	(Germany) Michael Schumacher	Mercedes	1:15.649	1:14.691	1:14.590	7
8	1	(United Kingdom) Jenson Button	McLaren-Mercedes	1:15.623	1:15.150	1:14.637	8
9	9	(Brazil) Rubens Barrichello	Williams-Cosworth	1:15.590	1:15.083	1:14.901	9
10	15	(Italy) Vitantonio Liuzzi	Force India-Mercedes	1:15.397	1:15.061	1:15.170	10
11	10	(Germany) Nico Hülkenberg	Williams-Cosworth	1:16.030	1:15.317		11^{1}
12	14	(Germany) Adrian Sutil	Force India-Mercedes	1:15.445	1:15.318		12
13	16	(Switzerland) Sébastien Buemi	Toro Rosso-Ferrari	1:15.961	1:15.413		13
14	12	(Russia) Vitaly Petrov	Renault	1:15.482	1:15.576		14
15	22	(Spain) Pedro de la Rosa	BMW Sauber-Ferrari	1:15.908	1:15.692		15
16	23	(Japan) Kamui Kobayashi	BMW Sauber-Ferrari	1:16.175	1:15.992		16
17	17	(Spain) Jaime Alguersuari	Toro Rosso-Ferrari	1:16.021	1:16.176		17
18	19	(Finland) Heikki Kovalainen	Lotus-Cosworth	1:17.094			18
19	18	(Italy) Jarno Trulli	Lotus-Cosworth	1:17.134			19
20	24	(Germany) Timo Glock	Virgin-Cosworth	1:17.377			20
21	25	(Brazil) Lucas di Grassi	Virgin-Cosworth	1:17.864			21
22	21	(Brazil) Bruno Senna	HRT-Cosworth	1:18.509			22
23	20	(India) Karun Chandhok	HRT-Cosworth	1:19.559			23
24	8	(Spain) Fernando Alonso	Ferrari	no time^{2}			PL

Notes:

1. – Nico Hülkenberg stalled on warm-up lap and started from back of the grid. His grid spot was left vacant.
2. – Fernando Alonso was unable to take part in qualifying following an accident at Massenet corner in the third practice session. He was cleared to compete, and opted to start the race from the pit lane.

=== Race ===
Pos	No	Driver	Constructor	Laps	Time/Retired	Grid	Points
1	6	(Australia) Mark Webber	Red Bull-Renault	78	1:50:13.355	1	25
2	5	(Germany) Sebastian Vettel	Red Bull-Renault	78	+0.448	3	18
3	11	(Poland) Robert Kubica	Renault	78	+1.675	2	15
4	7	(Brazil) Felipe Massa	Ferrari	78	+2.666	4	12
5	2	(United Kingdom) Lewis Hamilton	McLaren-Mercedes	78	+4.363	5	10
6	8	(Spain) Fernando Alonso	Ferrari	78	+6.341	PL	8
7	4	(Germany) Nico Rosberg	Mercedes	78	+6.651	6	6
8	14	(Germany) Adrian Sutil	Force India-Mercedes	78	+6.970	12	4
9	15	(Italy) Vitantonio Liuzzi	Force India-Mercedes	78	+7.305	10	2
10	16	(Switzerland) Sébastien Buemi	Toro Rosso-Ferrari	78	+8.199	13	1
11	17	(Spain) Jaime Alguersuari	Toro Rosso-Ferrari	78	+9.135	17	
12	3	(Germany) Michael Schumacher	Mercedes	78	+25.712^{1}	7	
13^{2}	12	(Russia) Vitaly Petrov	Renault	73	Brakes	14	
14^{2}	20	(India) Karun Chandhok	HRT-Cosworth	70	Collision	23	
15^{2}	18	(Italy) Jarno Trulli	Lotus-Cosworth	70	Collision	19	
Ret	19	(Finland) Heikki Kovalainen	Lotus-Cosworth	58	Steering	18	
Ret	21	(Brazil) Bruno Senna	HRT-Cosworth	58	Hydraulics	22	
Ret	9	(Brazil) Rubens Barrichello	Williams-Cosworth	30	Accident^{3}	9	
Ret	23	(Japan) Kamui Kobayashi	BMW Sauber-Ferrari	26	Gearbox	16	
Ret	25	(Brazil) Lucas di Grassi	Virgin-Cosworth	25	Loose wheel	21	
Ret	24	(Germany) Timo Glock	Virgin-Cosworth	22	Track rod	20	
Ret	22	(Spain) Pedro de la Rosa	BMW Sauber-Ferrari	21	Hydraulics	15	
Ret	1	(United Kingdom) Jenson Button	McLaren-Mercedes	2	Overheating	8	
Ret	10	(Germany) Nico Hülkenberg	Williams-Cosworth	0	Accident	11	

Notes:

1. – Michael Schumacher originally finished sixth, but received a 20-second penalty for passing Fernando Alonso on the last corner of the race under safety car conditions.
2. – Vitaly Petrov, Karun Chandhok, and Jarno Trulli were all classified as they had completed 90% of the winner's race distance (rounded down to 70 laps).
3. – Barrichello's accident was caused by a manhole cover which damaged his rear suspension.

== Championship standings after the race ==
Drivers' Championship standings

	Pos.	Driver	Points
3	1	(Australia) Mark Webber	78
1	2	(Germany) Sebastian Vettel	78
1	3	(Spain) Fernando Alonso	75
3	4	(United Kingdom) Jenson Button	70
2	5	(Brazil) Felipe Massa	61

Constructors' Championship standings

	Pos.	Constructor	Points
2	1	(Austria) Red Bull-Renault	156
	2	(Italy) Ferrari	136
2	3	(United Kingdom) McLaren-Mercedes	129
	4	(Germany) Mercedes	78
	5	(France) Renault	65

- Note: Only the top five positions are included for both sets of standings.

== See also ==
- 2010 Monaco GP2 Series round

Previous race: 2010 Spanish Grand Prix	FIA Formula One World Championship; 2010 season	Next race: 2010 Turkish Grand Prix
Previous race: 2009 Monaco Grand Prix	Monaco Grand Prix	Next race: 2011 Monaco Grand Prix
