= Wirth Research =

UK business

- Company type: Engineering
- Traded as: Wirth Research Ltd
- Industry: LeMans LMP Engineering Racing Design Simulators F1
- Founded: 2003
- Founder: Nicholas Wirth
- Headquarters: Bicester, Oxfordshire, England
- Website: www.wirthresearch.com

Wirth Research was founded by Nicholas Wirth in 2003, specialising in research, development, design and manufacture for the motor racing industry and other high technology sectors.

The company uses virtual engineering technologies to enable a completely simulated vehicle design, development and testing process. Wirth Research is known for deviating from traditional physical development models; most notably neglecting to use a wind tunnel and instead relying solely upon computational fluid dynamics (CFD) to design the 2010 Virgin Racing VR-01 Formula 1 car.

Wirth Research had a partnership with Honda Performance Development Inc (HPD) which is responsible for the design, development and manufacture of the ARX sports cars. Wirth Research also provided client IndyCar teams with full technical support.

Wirth Research now uses computational fluid dynamics technology to design energy products for buildings, supermarkets, and retailers.

== History ==
In 2003, Wirth Research initially focused on the motorsport industry, using CFD technologies to design and develop high-performance racing vehicles. In 2005, Wirth Research partnered with Honda and won the Indianapolis 500 (Indy 500) race. In 2006, Wirth Research started development of the Acura ARX-01 series to launch in the American Le Mans Series in 2007. In 2007, Wirth Research’s Acura ARX-01 won its class at the 12 Hours of Sebring Race.

In 2009, Wirth designed the LMP 1 Car ARX-02a, which achieved 8 wins at the American Le Mans Race. In 2010, the company partnered with Virgin Racing in Formula 1, where it designed the VR-01a, the first Formula 1 car to be designed without the use of a wind tunnel. In 2012, Wirth Research sold the Formula 1 arm of its business to Marussia Virgin Racing. Meanwhile, the ARX-03a and 03b cars competed in LMP1 and LMP2 classes, winning both class championships in ALMS, and LMP2 class wins in the World Championship and Le Mans 24hr. In 2014, Hunter-Reay, driving the No. 28 DHL car for Andretti Autosport, designed by Wirth Research, wins the Indiana 500.

In 2015, After pivoting the business to focus on low-carbon engineering, Wirth Research used its CFD technology to develop aerodynamic kits for Eddie Stobart trucks and trailers. In 2017, Wirth Research launched its Tilt Rotor, Vertical Take Off and Landing (VTOL), hydrogen fuel cell powered, advanced terrain mapping drone. Wirth Research also worked with Lockheed Martin to develop a light-weight unmanned aircraft system. In 2021, Wirth Research relocated its supercomputing operations to Verne Global's data center campus in Iceland.

== Diversification from F1 ==
Since 2015, Wirth Research pivoted from F1 aerodynamic design, and applied its CFD technology to create products to be used in retail spaces and the built environment. These products include the AirDoor, the EcoBlade, TrueChill and Aerokit.

Wirth Research’s products have been installed in Waitrose and John Lewis.

== Awards and Recognitions ==
- Green Awards 2025: Finalist in the Green Technology Award category for EcoBlade, TrueChill, and ClimateFlow technologies.
- NACS Convenience Retail Awards Europe 2024: Winner of the Sustainability Award, in collaboration with BWG Foods, for implementing TrueChill and ClimateFlow technologies.
- Energy Awards 2024: AirDoor was shortlisted as a finalist in the Physical Technology of the Year – Heating and Cooling category
- Thames Valley Tech Awards 2023: Recognized as the Sustainable Tech Company of the Year for the AirDoor, EcoBlade, and AeroKit
- CIBSE Building Performance Awards 2023: AirDoor won the Product or Innovation of the Year – Thermal Comfort category.
- Queen's Award for Enterprise 2022: Awarded in the Sustainable Development category for innovative energy solutions across diverse industries.
