= John Booth (motor racing) =

English Formula One team executive

- Born: John Alfred Booth; 18 December 1954 (age 71); Rotherham, England
- Known for: Manor Motorsport & Virgin/Marussia F1 Team, Director of Racing at Toro Rosso

John Alfred Booth (born 18 December 1954 in Rotherham, England) is the former Director of Racing at Scuderia Toro Rosso. He is the former team principal of the Virgin/Marussia Formula One team. He was initially the team's sporting director, but took over the role of team principal from Alex Tai less than one month after the team's launch.

== Motorsport career ==
Booth was a racing driver during the 1980s, with a family-run team, racing in Formula Ford and British Formula 3.

Named after the Anston Manor House where he lived, Booth created the Manor Motorsport team in 1990 when he sold the family butchers business. Over 20 years Manor's record of success includes some 171 race wins and 19 championship titles in series such as British Formula 3, Formula Renault and Formula Three Euroseries. Among the drivers who have gone on to greater things having raced with Manor Motorsport are: Lewis Hamilton, Kimi Räikkönen, Paul di Resta, Jason Plato, Oliver Jarvis and Antônio Pizzonia.

=== Formula One ===
==== Manor Grand Prix/Virgin Racing/Marussia F1 (2009-2015) ====
On 12 June 2009 it was announced Manor's application to participate in the 2010 Formula One season had been accepted - the original intention having been to race in GP2, but the entry list was full. Their F1 team was originally called Manor Grand Prix, but the name was later changed to Virgin Racing, with backing from Virgin Group and later still to the Marussia F1 Team, following Russian sports car manufacturer Marussia acquiring a controlling interest in the team. Booth had said that the F3 team will continue to run, despite his focus shifting to the F1 team. However, Manor have pulled out of the Euroseries, to compete in the new-for-2010 GP3 Series. On 30 October 2015, media announced the resignation of both Booth and Chief Executive Officer Graeme Lowdon from the team at the end of 2015, citing differences with team owner Stephen Fitzpatrick. An official statement by any party has not been made. Afterwards, Booth and Lowdon announced they would form a team in the World Endurance Championship, also known as Manor Motorsport, with former Manor drivers Will Stevens and Tor Graves.

==== Scuderia Toro Rosso (2016-18) ====
In April 2016, it was announced that Booth had joined Toro Rosso as Director of Racing. He later confirmed his departure from the team in April 2018.
