= 2011 British Grand Prix =

Race 9 of 19 in the 2011 Formula One World Championship
← Previous race	Next race →
- Silverstone Circuit

Race details
- Date: 10 July 2011
- Official name: 2011 Formula 1 Santander British Grand Prix
- Location: Silverstone Circuit, Northamptonshire and Buckinghamshire, England
- Course: Permanent racing facility
- Course length: 5.891 km (3.661 miles)
- Distance: 52 laps, 306.198 km (190.263 miles)
- Weather: Wet track at start; subsequently drying. Air Temp 20 °C (68 °F); Track Temp 22 °C (72 °F)

Pole position
Driver	(Australia) Mark Webber	Red Bull Racing-Renault
- Time: 1:30.399

Fastest lap
Driver	(Spain) Fernando Alonso	Ferrari
- Time: 1:34.908 on lap 41

Podium
First	(Spain) Fernando Alonso	Ferrari
Second	(Germany) Sebastian Vettel	Red Bull Racing-Renault
Third	(Australia) Mark Webber	Red Bull Racing-Renault

The 2011 British Grand Prix (formally the 2011 Formula 1 Santander British Grand Prix) was a Formula One motor race held on 10 July 2011 at the Silverstone Circuit in Northamptonshire and Buckinghamshire, England, and won by Fernando Alonso. It was the ninth race of the 2011 season, and saw the introduction of a ban on off-throttle blown diffusers, the practice of forcing the engine to continue to produce exhaust gasses to generate downforce when drivers are not using the throttle. The race also saw the Formula One debut of future Grand Prix winner Daniel Ricciardo.

== Report ==
=== Background ===
The circuit underwent a major reconfiguration for the 2010 British Grand Prix, with the addition of the "Arena" loop bypassing the old Abbey, Bridge and Priory corners before re-joining at Brooklands. The 2011 race saw the second stage of this reconfiguration used for the first time, with the pits and the start/finish line moved to the straight between Club Corner and the new Abbey. The new pit facility was deliberately designed to be challenging for drivers, and to minimise the amount of time spent in the pits. The entry lane branches off from the circuit on the approach to Vale and Club – one of the slowest sections of the circuit – allowing a pitting driver to continue to accelerate while others are forced to slow for the corner. The pit lane itself does not run parallel to the main straight, but rather is angled at five degrees to make the corner at the entry to the pit lane slightly faster. Red Bull Racing team principal Christian Horner noted that the pits are lower than the circuit proper, and that he believed that drivers would have to treat the corner at the entry to the pit lane as they would a corner on the circuit.

Following complaints from MotoGP riders in 2010, the entry to the new Abbey has been re-surfaced to remove a large bump situated on the racing line. The reconfiguration was not without controversy, as the lowered pit lane meant that the pit garages were obscured from the view of the spectators by a retaining wall. Formula One Management reversed the intended pit lane order, placing the Red Bull Racing, McLaren and Ferrari pit garages behind the retaining wall, and moving the Team Lotus, Hispania and Virgin teams' garages to the visible end of the pit lane. The change in the allocation of garages was believed to be for the benefit of corporate guests in the Formula One "Paddock Club", a corporate suite housed above the far end of the pit lane obscured from view.

After experimenting with two Drag Reduction System (DRS) zones in Montreal and Valencia, the FIA announced that the sport would return to using only the one DRS zone at Silverstone, with the activation point placed before Aintree corner, allowing drivers to deploy the system for the length of the Wellington Straight.

Tyre supplier Pirelli brought its silver-banded hard compound tyre as the harder "prime" tyre and the yellow-banded soft compound as the softer "option" compound. This was the same tyre selection that Bridgestone had chosen to bring to the British Grand Prix for the previous two years.

On 30 June, it was announced that Scuderia Toro Rosso testing and reserve driver Daniel Ricciardo would replace Narain Karthikeyan at HRT Formula 1 Team. With Mark Webber driving for Red Bull Racing, Ricciardo's debut marks the first time that two Australian drivers have competed in the same race since Alan Jones and Vern Schuppan raced in the 1977 Austrian Grand Prix.

=== Practice ===
The first ninety-minute session of the weekend was deemed wet. The initial lap times were slow, but as a dry line began to appear around the circuit, the drivers switched to Pirelli's intermediate compound, and lap times began to improve significantly. Mark Webber set the fastest time of the session, but experienced fuel problems and stopped on the circuit. Michael Schumacher finished second ahead of Rubens Barrichello third. The rain returned late in the session, and Kamui Kobayashi crashed heavily on the pit straight. Sauber were able to repair Kobayashi's car in time for the second session, where he finished third overall. The session was once again wet, with conditions worse than in the morning session; almost half of the ninety minutes had passed before any driver took to the circuit. A dry line gradually began to form around the circuit once again, prompting many drivers to start setting times. Felipe Massa finished the session fastest, nearly eight-tenths of a second clear of Nico Rosberg and Kobayashi.

The third and final practice session was held in the driest conditions of the weekend, interrupted by a brief shower early in the session. Sebastian Vettel finished the hour-long session fastest, six hundredths of a second faster than Fernando Alonso and four-tenths quicker than team-mate Mark Webber, whose progress was hampered by an early problem with his gearbox. Michael Schumacher also experienced technical problems, this time with his floor, and finished the session eleventh.

=== Qualifying ===
The first qualifying period saw all twenty-four cars take to the circuit as soon as the session began in response to the imminent threat of rain; it was noted by teams and commentators alike that the old start line and Copse corner in particular were slippery. Several drivers topped the timing sheets, including Fernando Alonso, Mark Webber, Pastor Maldonado and Sebastian Vettel, with Webber ultimately setting the fastest time of the session. Alonso had an excursion into the gravel trap at Luffield, but emerged unscathed and went on to set his fastest time within two laps of the incident, while the Toro Rossos of Jaime Alguersuari and Sébastien Buemi were caught out on the circuit as a heavy downpour began in the final five minutes of the session. Both drivers were eliminated, with Alguersuari qualifying seventeenth and Buemi eighteenth, allowing Heikki Kovalainen to enter Q2 for the first time since the 2011 Spanish Grand Prix. Timo Glock qualified his Virgin MVR-02 in twentieth place ahead of Jarno Trulli in the second Lotus T128 and Jérôme d'Ambrosio. The Hispanias of Vitantonio Liuzzi and Daniel Ricciardo qualified on the final row of the grid, with the Australian rookie half a second behind his team-mate.

The rain died down in the interlude following the first qualifying period, and when the second period began, the drivers took to the circuit on a variety of tyre compounds, including both the hard and soft dry tyres and the intermediate-grade rubber owing to the varying conditions around the circuit; the old main straight and Copse remained slippery, while the Vale and Club Corner were noticeably dry. Many of the drivers were simply performing sighting laps in an attempt to decide which tyres were best-suited to the conditions, waiting for lap times to be set on all compounds to establish a base lap time. Once the first lap times were established, the drivers pitted for the dry compounds and took to the circuit once more in another race to beat the weather. Almost every driver in the session was the fastest man on circuit at some point during the session, but once the circuit finally rubbered in, Fernando Alonso and Lewis Hamilton start setting times two seconds faster than the rest of the field, led by Adrian Sutil. Felipe Massa went on to set the fastest time from Webber and Alonso, while a late lap from Jenson Button saw him through to the final qualifying period. Adrian Sutil was eliminated in eleventh, followed by Sergio Pérez. Michael Schumacher qualified thirteenth, the first time he had qualified outside the top ten at Silverstone in his career. Vitaly Petrov and Nick Heidfeld finished the session in fourteenth and sixteenth respectively – split by the Williams of Rubens Barrichello – in Renault's worst qualifying performance of the season. Heikki Kovalainen qualified seventeenth after setting just one lap time to preserve tyres for the race.

The final period began as the previous two had, with most of the drivers venturing out as soon as the circuit was opened. The front-running drivers planned for two separate runs, but were anticipating rain later in the period, making the early laps crucial. Meanwhile, Pastor Maldonado, Kamui Kobayashi and Paul di Resta opted for just one qualifying run. Mark Webber claimed his second pole position of the season, just three-hundredths of a second ahead of Vettel on their first run before the predicted rain arrived three minutes from the end of the session. The Ferraris of Alonso and Massa filled the second row of the grid, ahead of Button, di Resta and Maldonado. Button had been attempting a final flying lap at the end of the period, but was interrupted by the arrival of the rain and aborted the lap early. Kamui Kobayashi finished eighth ahead of Nico Rosberg, who, like Button, had his final flying run cut short by the conditions. Lewis Hamilton qualified tenth when he set a lap time on worn tyres before the rain arrived, denying him the opportunity to better his lap time. This session marked Sebastian Vettel's 14th consecutive front row start.

=== Race ===
The race started under difficult conditions, with a full wet track from the Arena to Chapel, but the remaining sections being dry; as a result of this all of the teams elected to run on intermediate tyres. Before the start Lewis Hamilton and Sergio Pérez slid off the circuit, with Pérez damaging his car's front wing. At the start Sebastian Vettel beat Webber to the first corner, while Jenson Button passed Felipe Massa. Lewis Hamilton made up four positions on the first lap after starting from tenth. The two Renaults of Nick Heidfeld and Vitaly Petrov had a small collision at Vale, nearly taking Vitaly Petrov out of the race. The difficult conditions meant drivers were forced to nurse the intermediate tyres through the dry sections of the circuit to preserve the integrity of the tyres through the wet stretches. This resulted in the drivers having to stay out on the circuit as long as possible until the circuit became dry enough to switch to the dry-compound tyres, or else risk making an extra stop and losing track position.

Vettel started building up a comfortable lead ahead of Webber whilst Jenson Button struggled, first losing fourth place to Massa and then being passed by Hamilton as the 2008 World Champion climbed back up through the field. The Lotuses of Heikki Kovalainen and Jarno Trulli became the first retirements of the race, stopping within the first ten laps of the race due to gearbox issues. As the first round of scheduled pit stops approached, Michael Schumacher collided with Kamui Kobayashi at Luffield, spinning the Japanese driver around. Schumacher was forced to replace his front wing and was subsequently given a ten-second stop-go penalty for causing an avoidable accident; as the new pit complex was designed in such a way that drivers would spend a minimal amount of time in the pits, the stewards decided that a stop-go penalty was more appropriate than a drive-through. Kamui Kobayashi was given a similar penalty when he pitted due to an unsafe release that saw him drive over a wheel gun. Kobayashi would then go on to retire from the Grand Prix when his engine expired. Meanwhile, Jaime Alguersuari and Sébastien Buemi were fighting up the order from their poor grid positions, and both successfully passed the struggling Renault of Vitaly Petrov. At Force India, Paul di Resta was delayed in the pits when the team were expecting Adrian Sutil, and thus had Sutil's tyres ready in a similar incident to a mistake at the 2010 German Grand Prix, forcing di Resta to wait while tyres from his own allocation were found. The error dropped di Resta well down the order, and he eventually made contact with Buemi at Copse, damaging the Swiss driver's left-rear tyre. Yellow flags were displayed as Buemi tried to limp back to the pits, but his tyre soon disintegrated and he had to retire by the side of the track.

The second round of pit stops saw Vettel and Alonso enter at the same time, but an uncharacteristic mistake from the Red Bull mechanics meant Vettel was delayed and allowing Alonso to take the lead of the race. Vettel emerged in third behind Lewis Hamilton, and struggled to pass the McLaren driver as Alonso increased his lead. Red Bull would eventually pit Vettel for a third time to allow him to run in clear air. Meanwhile, Button pitted for new tyres but retired from the race after the front right wheelnut was not attached, leaving the wheel visibly loose on the exit from the pits and continuing Button's run of poor results in his home race. With less than ten laps to go, Hamilton was told to start conserving fuel to finish the race. This slowed him to the point where Vettel and Webber were able to pass him and put him in danger of being passed by Felipe Massa. As the race entered the final two laps, Webber was close enough to Vettel to attempt a pass while Massa was visibly faster than Hamilton. Webber was given an order by the team not to pass Vettel, but ignored it. He was ultimately unsuccessful, and finished in third place. Behind them, Massa caught Hamilton on the final lap and attempted a pass into Vale corner. Hamilton, holding a defensive line into the corner, was unable to slow the car down in time and the two made contact. This forced Massa off the racing line through Club corner and across the line; Hamilton prevailed by two hundredths of a second, while Massa ran wide and crossed the finish line on the tarmac run-off on the outside of the corner. The stewards investigated, but no action was taken.

Alonso won the race – Ferrari's only win of the 2011 season – sixteen seconds ahead of Vettel and Webber with Hamilton fourth and Massa fifth. Nico Rosberg finished sixth, five seconds ahead of Sergio Pérez in a career-best finish. Nick Heidfeld salvaged four points for Renault in eighth place and Schumacher recovered from his penalty to place ninth. Vitaly Petrov's failure to score meant that Mercedes took fourth place in the World Constructors' Championship. Jaime Alguersuari took the final point-scoring position in tenth, his third successive finish in the points. Daniel Ricciardo was the nineteenth and final classified finisher on his race debut.

== Diffuser ban and controversy ==
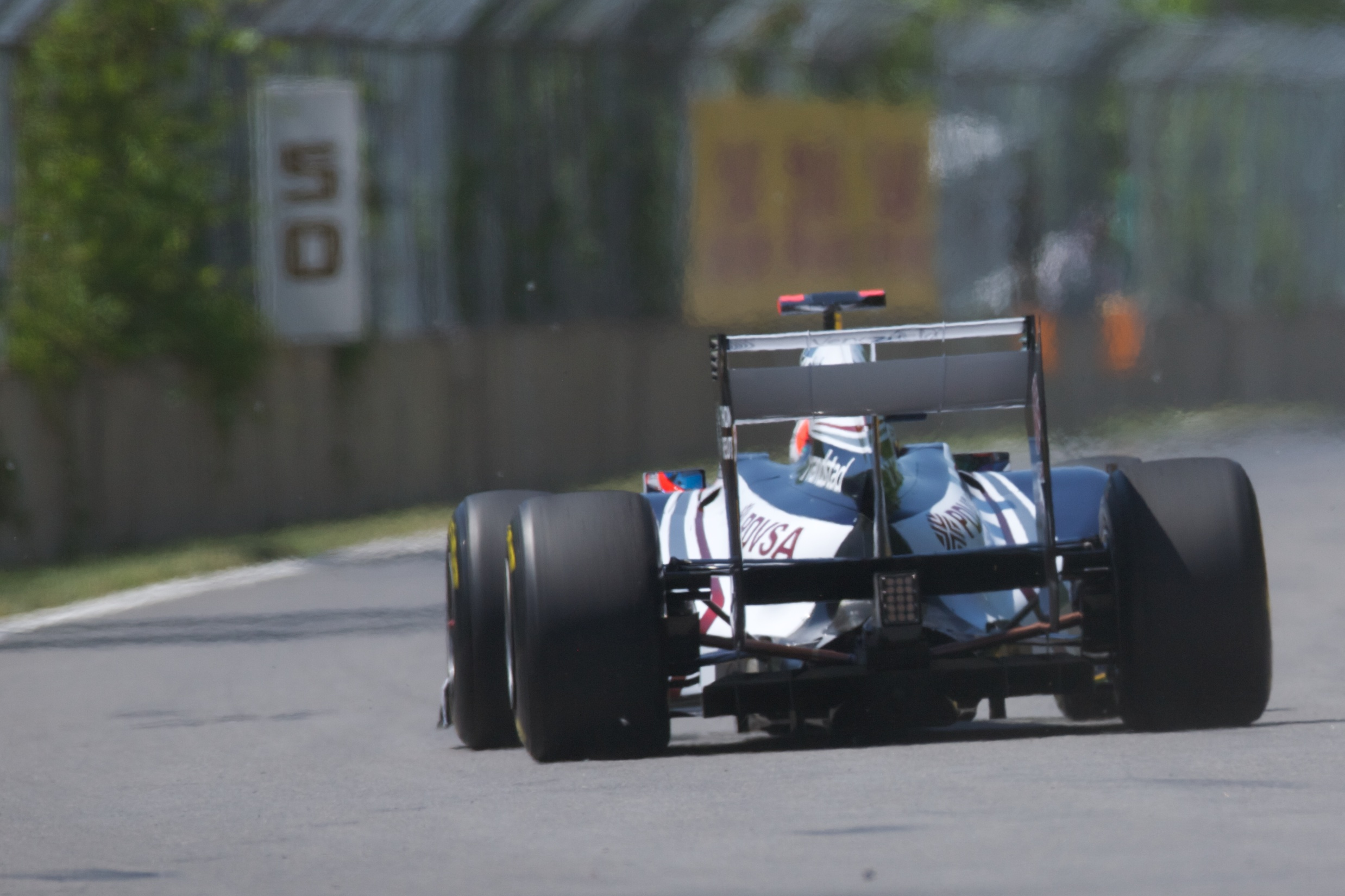
The controversy covered the changing of the usage of blowing exhaust fumes through the diffuser at the rear of the car

The race also saw teams banned from using the "off-throttle blown diffuser" concept. Previously, teams had mapped their engines to burn fuel when the driver lifted off the throttle. This created exhaust gasses that were routed over the diffuser at the rear of the car, generating additional downforce. This counters the loss of downforce experienced with blown diffusers when the driver lifts off the throttle. Compared to a car with a conventional blown diffuser, the additional downforce produced while off throttle improves grip under braking and in slower corners while also making the car's handling less throttle sensitive. Some estimates suggested that this allowed teams to find upwards of one second per lap. Off-throttle blown diffusers had been a source of controversy when the FIA previously banned them at the Spanish Grand Prix, only to recant the ban twenty-four hours later pending a discussion with the sport's Technical Working Group, and prompting Hispania to threaten a protest of the race results. This led to speculation that engine supplier Cosworth had been unable to map their engines appropriately and thus could not take advantage of the off-throttle concept as none of the Cosworth-powered teams – Virgin, Williams and Hispania (as well as the Ferrari-powered Sauber and Toro Rosso teams) – were using off-throttle blown diffusers. Charlie Whiting, the FIA's technical delegate, ruled that off-throttle blown diffusers qualified as a movable aerodynamic part because the concept used moveable parts within the engine to manipulate relative levels of aerodynamic grip, and were therefore illegal under the FIA's long-standing ban on moveable aerodynamic parts. The ban stated that teams may only map their engines to use ten percent of available throttle power when under braking, with further restrictions to be introduced in 2012. Adrian Newey, Red Bull Racing's technical director, admitted that his team had the most to lose from the ban on off-throttle blown diffusers because the Red Bull RB7 had been designed around the concept, in comparison to other teams who had simply applied it to their respective cars after the fact.

I think that the top teams will lose quite a bit, because we've had this for a little while now so you start designing the car around the systems that you have in place. It's going to be a reasonably big hit and you'll feel it everywhere: high, low speed, not so much on power but it's more under braking and high speed corners. I think the biggest problem will be is that braking and exit will be very different in corners to the feeling of the car, could be changing a lot, so that's probably the thing that you need to get used to ... there's no safety issues. We feel the circuit, we feel the car. When it's wet we have to drive the car slower because it's easier to go off because there's less grip. There's no safety issues, no.

— Jenson Button, on describing the effects on the car of the off-throttle blown diffuser ban.

Further controversy erupted on the Friday of the Grand Prix when it was revealed that the FIA had allowed Renault-powered teams certain concessions over the ban. Where the ban prevented teams from running engine maps that simulated throttle conditions of more than 10%, Renault had applied for a special exemption to the rule on the grounds that running at 10% of full throttle conditions adversely affected the reliability of their engines. The FIA granted the concession, permitting them to run up to 50% of full throttle. This sparked a protest from the Mercedes-powered teams, in particular McLaren. Red Bull Racing's Christian Horner responded to the protest, stating that the Mercedes teams had been granted concessions of their own to manage pressure within the crank case. The FIA agreed to review the exemptions granted to the Renault-powered teams, and the concessions allowed to Renault-powered teams were revoked ahead of the final free practice session on Saturday morning; however, early reports indicated that the concessions granted to Mercedes-powered teams would remain in place, with Red Bull and McLaren team principals Christian Horner and Martin Whitmarsh seeking clarification over the matter with FIA technical delegate Charlie Whiting, who called an extraordinary meeting of the sport's Technical Working Group to resolve the dispute. Due to the teams' dissatisfaction with the situation, the FIA has stated that it is prepared to withdraw the rule change from the German Grand Prix, restoring the Valencia specification of regulations, which would allow teams the freedom to run engine maps at their discretion, but require them to use the same engine maps between qualifying and the race. However, team principals and technical chiefs failed to come to an agreement at an extraordinary meeting on Sunday morning, with the Ferrari-powered Ferrari and Sauber teams refusing to sign an agreement restoring the pre-Silverstone specifications. At a second meeting among the teams on Sunday afternoon, Ferrari and Sauber agreed to the terms of the proposal, abandoning the ban on blown diffusers for the 2011 season.

== Classification ==
=== Qualifying ===
Pos	No	Driver	Constructor	Part 1	Part 2	Part 3	Grid
1	2	(Australia) Mark Webber	Red Bull Racing-Renault	1:32.670	1:31.673	1:30.399	1
2	1	(Germany) Sebastian Vettel	Red Bull Racing-Renault	1:32.977	1:32.379	1:30.431	2
3	5	(Spain) Fernando Alonso	Ferrari	1:32.986	1:31.727	1:30.516	3
4	6	(Brazil) Felipe Massa	Ferrari	1:32.760	1:31.640	1:31.124	4
5	4	(United Kingdom) Jenson Button	McLaren-Mercedes	1:34.230	1:32.273	1:31.898	5
6	15	(United Kingdom) Paul di Resta	Force India-Mercedes	1:34.472	1:32.569	1:31.929	6
7	12	(Venezuela) Pastor Maldonado	Williams-Cosworth	1:32.702	1:32.588	1:31.933	7
8	16	(Japan) Kamui Kobayashi	Sauber-Ferrari	1:34.324	1:32.399	1:32.128	8
9	8	(Germany) Nico Rosberg	Mercedes	1:34.186	1:32.295	1:32.209	9
10	3	(United Kingdom) Lewis Hamilton	McLaren-Mercedes	1:33.581	1:32.505	1:32.376	10
11	14	(Germany) Adrian Sutil	Force India-Mercedes	1:34.454	1:32.617		11
12	17	(Mexico) Sergio Pérez	Sauber-Ferrari	1:34.145	1:32.624		12
13	7	(Germany) Michael Schumacher	Mercedes	1:34.160	1:32.656		13
14	10	(Russia) Vitaly Petrov	Renault	1:34.428	1:32.734		14
15	11	(Brazil) Rubens Barrichello	Williams-Cosworth	1:33.532	1:33.119		15
16	9	(Germany) Nick Heidfeld	Renault	1:35.132	1:33.805		16
17	20	(Finland) Heikki Kovalainen	Lotus-Renault	1:34.923	1:34.821		17
18	19	(Spain) Jaime Alguersuari	Toro Rosso-Ferrari	1:35.245			18
19	18	(Switzerland) Sébastien Buemi	Toro Rosso-Ferrari	1:35.749			19
20	24	(Germany) Timo Glock	Virgin-Cosworth	1:36.203			20
21	21	(Italy) Jarno Trulli	Lotus-Renault	1:36.456			21
22	25	(Belgium) Jérôme d'Ambrosio	Virgin-Cosworth	1:37.154			22
23	23	(Italy) Vitantonio Liuzzi	HRT-Cosworth	1:37.484			23
24	22	(Australia) Daniel Ricciardo	HRT-Cosworth	1:38.059			24
107% time: 1:39.156

=== Race ===
Pos	No	Driver	Constructor	Laps	Time/Retired	Grid	Points
1	5	(Spain) Fernando Alonso	Ferrari	52	1:28:41.196	3	25
2	1	(Germany) Sebastian Vettel	Red Bull Racing-Renault	52	+16.511	2	18
3	2	(Australia) Mark Webber	Red Bull Racing-Renault	52	+16.947	1	15
4	3	(United Kingdom) Lewis Hamilton	McLaren-Mercedes	52	+28.986	10	12
5	6	(Brazil) Felipe Massa	Ferrari	52	+29.010	4	10
6	8	(Germany) Nico Rosberg	Mercedes	52	+1:00.655	9	8
7	17	(Mexico) Sergio Pérez	Sauber-Ferrari	52	+1:05.590	12	6
8	9	(Germany) Nick Heidfeld	Renault	52	+1:15.542	16	4
9	7	(Germany) Michael Schumacher	Mercedes	52	+1:17.912	13	2
10	19	(Spain) Jaime Alguersuari	Toro Rosso-Ferrari	52	+1:19.108	18	1
11	14	(Germany) Adrian Sutil	Force India-Mercedes	52	+1:19.712	11	
12	10	(Russia) Vitaly Petrov	Renault	52	+1:20.681	14	
13	11	(Brazil) Rubens Barrichello	Williams-Cosworth	51	+1 Lap	15	
14	12	(Venezuela) Pastor Maldonado	Williams-Cosworth	51	+1 Lap	7	
15	15	(United Kingdom) Paul di Resta	Force India-Mercedes	51	+1 Lap	6	
16	24	(Germany) Timo Glock	Virgin-Cosworth	50	+2 Laps	20	
17	25	(Belgium) Jérôme d'Ambrosio	Virgin-Cosworth	50	+2 Laps	22	
18	23	(Italy) Vitantonio Liuzzi	HRT-Cosworth	50	+2 Laps	23	
19	22	(Australia) Daniel Ricciardo	HRT-Cosworth	49	+3 Laps	24	
Ret	4	(United Kingdom) Jenson Button	McLaren-Mercedes	39	Wheel	5	
Ret	18	(Switzerland) Sébastien Buemi	Toro Rosso-Ferrari	25	Collision	19	
Ret	16	(Japan) Kamui Kobayashi	Sauber-Ferrari	23	Oil leak	8	
Ret	21	(Italy) Jarno Trulli	Lotus-Renault	10	Oil leak	21	
Ret	20	(Finland) Heikki Kovalainen	Lotus-Renault	2	Gearbox	17	

== Championship standings after the race ==
Drivers' Championship standings

	Pos.	Driver	Points
	1	(Germany) Sebastian Vettel	204
1	2	(Australia) Mark Webber	124
2	3	(Spain) Fernando Alonso	112
	4	(United Kingdom) Lewis Hamilton	109
3	5	(United Kingdom) Jenson Button	109

Constructors' Championship standings

	Pos.	Constructor	Points
	1	(Austria) Red Bull Racing-Renault	328
	2	(United Kingdom) McLaren-Mercedes	218
	3	(Italy) Ferrari	164
1	4	(Germany) Mercedes	68
1	5	(United Kingdom) Renault	65

- Note: Only the top five positions are included for both sets of standings.

== See also ==
- 2011 Silverstone GP2 Series round
- 2011 Silverstone GP3 Series round

Previous race: 2011 European Grand Prix	FIA Formula One World Championship; 2011 season	Next race: 2011 German Grand Prix
Previous race: 2010 British Grand Prix	British Grand Prix	Next race: 2012 British Grand Prix
