= Virgin MVR-02 =

2011 Formula One motor racing car

- Jérôme d'Ambrosio driving the MVR-02 at the Italian Grand Prix
- Category: Formula One
- Constructor: Virgin Racing
- Designers: Nick Wirth (Technical Director); John McQuilliam (Chief Designer); Richard Taylor (Head of Aerodynamics)
- Predecessor: Virgin VR-01
- Successor: Marussia MR01

Technical specifications
- Chassis: carbon-fibre construction monocoque and nosebox
- Suspension (front): carbon-fibre wishbones with titanium flexure joints, aluminium alloy uprights, Penske dampers
- Suspension (rear): as front
- Engine: Cosworth CA2011 2,400 cc (146.5 cu in) 90° V8, limited to 18,000 RPM, naturally aspirated, mid-mounted
- Transmission: Seven-speed semi-automatic gearbox with reverse gear, Aluminium construction, "seamless shift", electronically controlled hydraulic differential
- Weight: 640 kg (1,411 lb) (including driver)
- Fuel: BP
- Tyres: Pirelli P Zero; BBS Wheels (front and rear): 13"

Competition history
- Notable entrants: Marussia Virgin Racing
- Notable drivers: 24. (Germany) Timo Glock; 25. (Belgium) Jérôme d'Ambrosio
- Debut: 2011 Australian Grand Prix
- Last event: 2011 Brazilian Grand Prix
| Races | Wins | Podiums | Poles | F/Laps |
|---|---|---|---|---|
| 19 | 0 | 0 | 0 | 0 |

The Virgin MVR-02 is a Formula One racing car designed by Wirth Research for Marussia Virgin Racing, and used by them during the 2011 Formula One season. Like its predecessor, the Virgin VR-01, the MVR-02 was designed entirely with computational fluid dynamics, with Nick Wirth's design studio doubling their CFD capacity ahead of the 2011 season. The addition of the "M" in the car's chassis designation reflected the team's new owner, Russian sports car manufacturer Marussia Motors. The car was unveiled in London on 7 February 2011, and was driven during the racing season by returning driver Timo Glock and debutant Jérôme d'Ambrosio.

== Design ==
The MVR-02 followed the VR-01's design principle of exclusively using computational fluid dynamics instead of the more traditional windtunnel approach. The car did not use KERS; chief designer Nick Wirth commented that the gains offered by the system did not justify the expense of developing it. Instead, the team concentrated on improving the car's hydraulics and gearbox, both of which had been the frequent source of problems in 2010. After being forced to re-design the VR-01 when it was discovered the fuel tank was not large enough to finish races with high fuel consumption, the MVR-02 was designed to be the same length as the original VR-01 chassis whilst retaining the full-size fuel tank. The air intake on the front of the nose was designed to resemble the one on Marussia's road car, the Marussia B2.

In June 2011 that Marussia Virgin Racing announced that they had ended their relationship with technical partner Nick Wirth and his company, Wirth Research, who designed their 2010 and 2011 cars. The reason cited was a disappointing start to their 2011 season.

== Racing history ==
The MVR-02 entered its first race at the Australian Grand Prix. The car was performing poorly due to the condition of the track and speculation rose up that Virgin was not going to be able to race. However, both Timo Glock and Jérôme d'Ambrosio made it through qualifying, taking the penultimate row on the grid. Once the race went underway Glock was forced to make a lengthy stop in the garage, due to a mechanical failure. As a result, Glock completed less than 90% of the race distance and although the car was running at the end of the race he was not classified in the standings. D'Ambrosio finished sixteenth on the track, but the disqualification of both Sauber cars bumped him up to fourteenth.

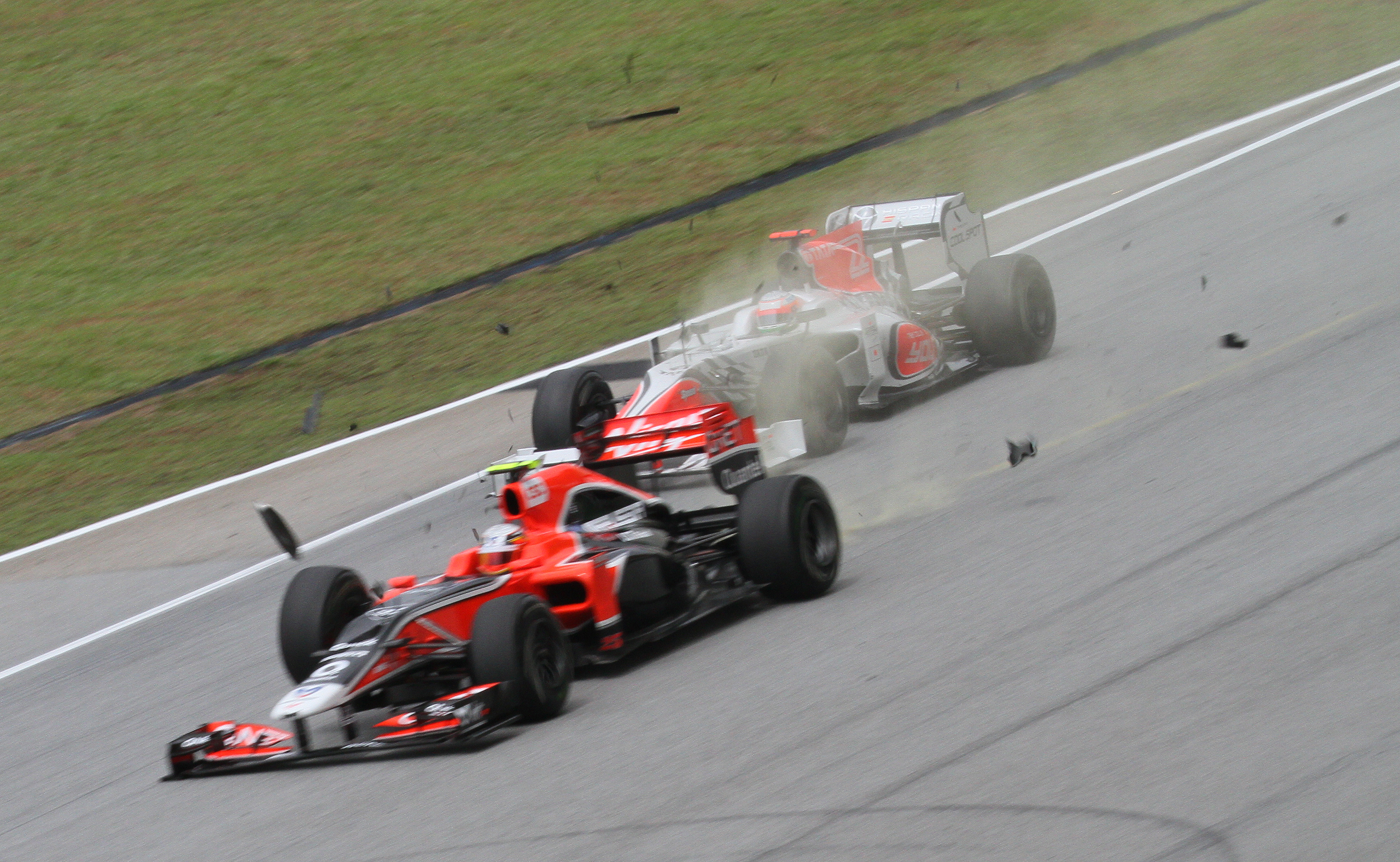
d'Ambrosio suffered a catastrophic suspension failure during the first Malaysian Grand Prix practice session.

At the Malaysian Grand Prix, d'Ambrosio suffered from a mechanical failure during free practice. Qualifying was a repeat of Australia, with the drivers taking twenty-first and twenty-second. In the race d'Ambrosio retired due to electronic problems. Glock finished sixteenth, his first classified finish of the season. With only one retirement at the Chinese Grand Prix, both drivers finished just one place higher than their qualifying positions, in 20th and 21st places.

For the Turkish Grand Prix the team applied their first upgrade to the car. Glock was given an "extreme" update, while d'Ambrosio had to wait until the Spanish Grand Prix. Despite this, d'Ambrosio was faster than Glock for the whole weekend. The stewards awarded him a five-place grid penalty after ignoring yellow flags on Friday, due to which his starting place was twenty-third, while Glock's was twenty-first. When it came time for the cars to take their positions on the grid Glock's pit crew noticed a mechanical fault and set to correct it. However, the repair proved so drawn out that Glock ended up not racing. D'Ambrosio suffered from no problems and drove the car home to twentieth place.

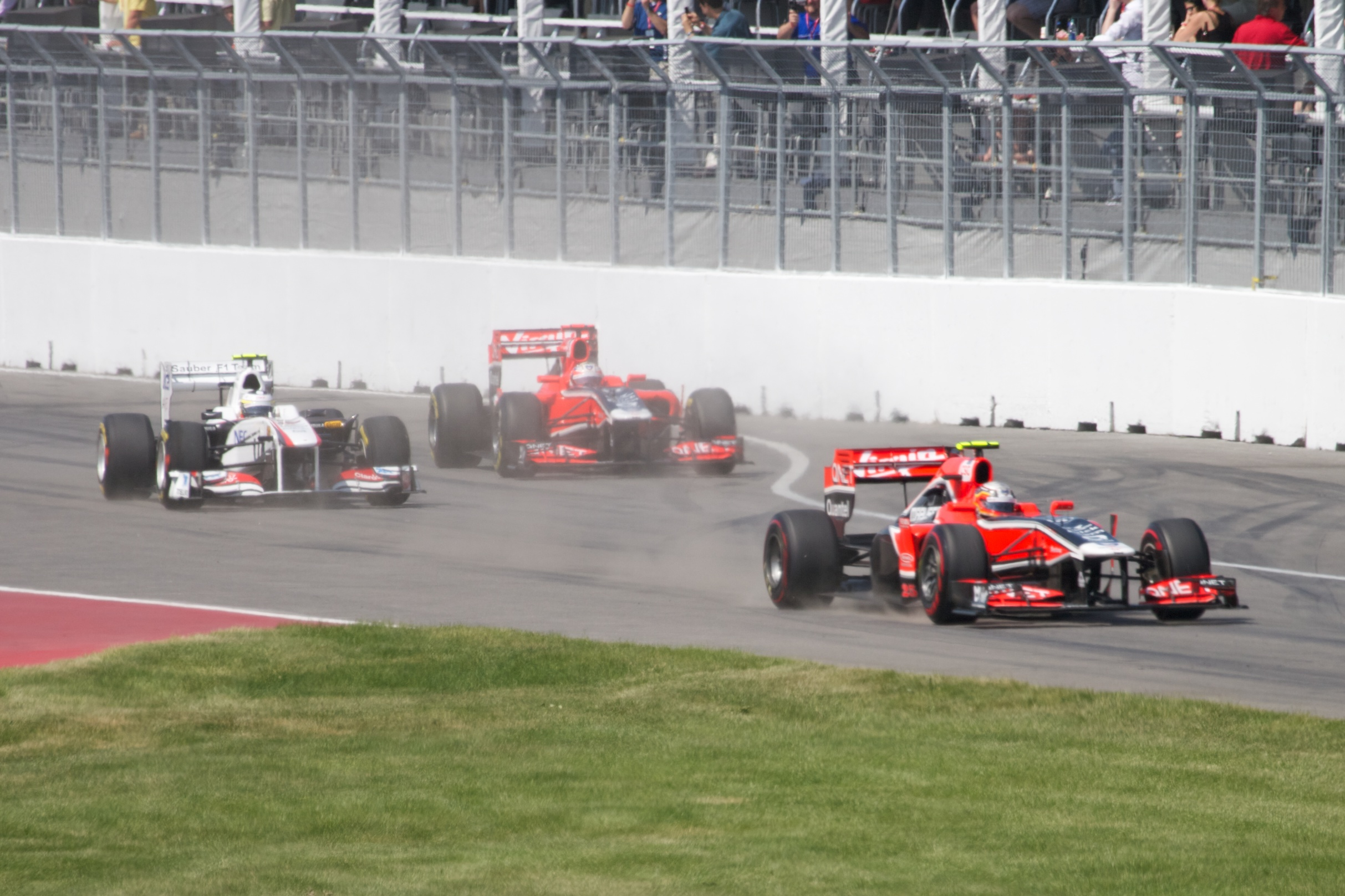
The MVR-02 scored its best result in a wet Canadian Grand Prix, with d'Ambrosio and Glock in fourteenth and fifteenth, respectively

During the Spanish Grand Prix both cars had been upgraded and finish nineteenth and twentieth, with both drivers not complaining of any faults. At the Monaco Grand Prix the MVR-02 once again took the eleventh row on the grid. In the race, Glock suffered a suspension failure on lap 30. After the dramatic and unprecedented end of the race, d'Ambrosio finished fifteenth, bringing the MVR-02 to another classified finish.

At the Canadian Grand Prix, the MVR-02s showed enough pace to finish fourteenth and fifteenth. At the following race, the European Grand Prix, the Marussia Virgin team complained that diffuser rules appeared to have hampered their chances of being competitive.

Glock and d'Ambrosio qualified 21st and 23rd for the race. Then came the British Grand Prix, which was the first race with full diffuser bans. The track conditions were in between dry and damp, conditions that had hampered the team in Australia. Glock finished in sixteenth and d'Ambrosio was seventeenth.

In Germany the two cars qualified twentieth and twenty-second on the grid, with Glock ahead of d'Ambrosio. Glock commented to his engineers on the car-to-pit radio that they were making it "difficult for him" after this. Glock later tried to cover up his comments by saying they were meant in a joking way. Glock announced the following day that he would be staying with the team until 2014. The two cars finished the race in the same order, but in seventeenth and eighteenth places. The MVR-02s sandwiched the HRTs in Hungary, having qualified in twenty-first and last places. Glock finished the race of mixed weather conditions seventeenth and his teammate d'Ambrosio was nineteenth.

The car was not expected to do well in the power circuit of Spa-Francorchamps. The cars were twentieth and twenty-first, with d'Ambrosio outside the 107% rule for his home race. He was allowed to race, however, because it had been a mixed weather qualifying. With no such weather in the race, he brought the car home in seventeenth, one place above Glock.

Despite outqualifying and out-racing HRT, the Italian Grand Prix at Monza was quite disappointing for the MVR-02. Qualifying on the second back row, d'Ambrosio suffered a gearbox failure on lap 1, and although Glock managed one of the team's best results of the year with a fifteenth-place finish, this was last place. It was the same Q1 result in Singapore, although Glock crashed out on lap nine whilst d'Ambrosio finished eighteenth. The Virgin cars took positions 20 and 21 in both qualifying and the race in Japan. They beat the HRTs and Nico Rosberg's Mercedes, which had suffered hydraulics failure, in Qualifying, before again beating the HRTs and benefiting from the retirement of Sébastien Buemi in the race. At the Korean Grand Prix, Glock and D'Ambrosio qualified twenty-first and twenty-second before finishing twentieth and twenty-second.

At the first-ever Indian Grand Prix, the cars set the two slowest times in qualifying, with D'Ambrosio the faster of the two teammates inside the 107% rule time, and Glock nearly two seconds outside of it. Glock was allowed to start the race because he set competitive times in practice. The two HRT cars were given penalties, so the cars started on the penultimate row instead. The race was short-lived for Glock, who retired after just two laps after being run into by the Sauber of Kobayashi. D'Ambrosio finished sixteenth, ahead of the two HRTs and Jarno Trulli. In Abu Dhabi, Glock qualified twentieth and finished nineteenth whilst D'Ambrosio qualified two places lower and retired from the race with brake problems.

The season finale - the Brazilian Grand Prix - was the team's final race as Virgin. D'Ambrosio qualified ahead of Glock, but the pair were on the last row of the grid. Glock became the first retirement of the race, whilst D'Ambrosio finished nineteenth, ahead of the two HRTs.

== Sponsorship and livery ==
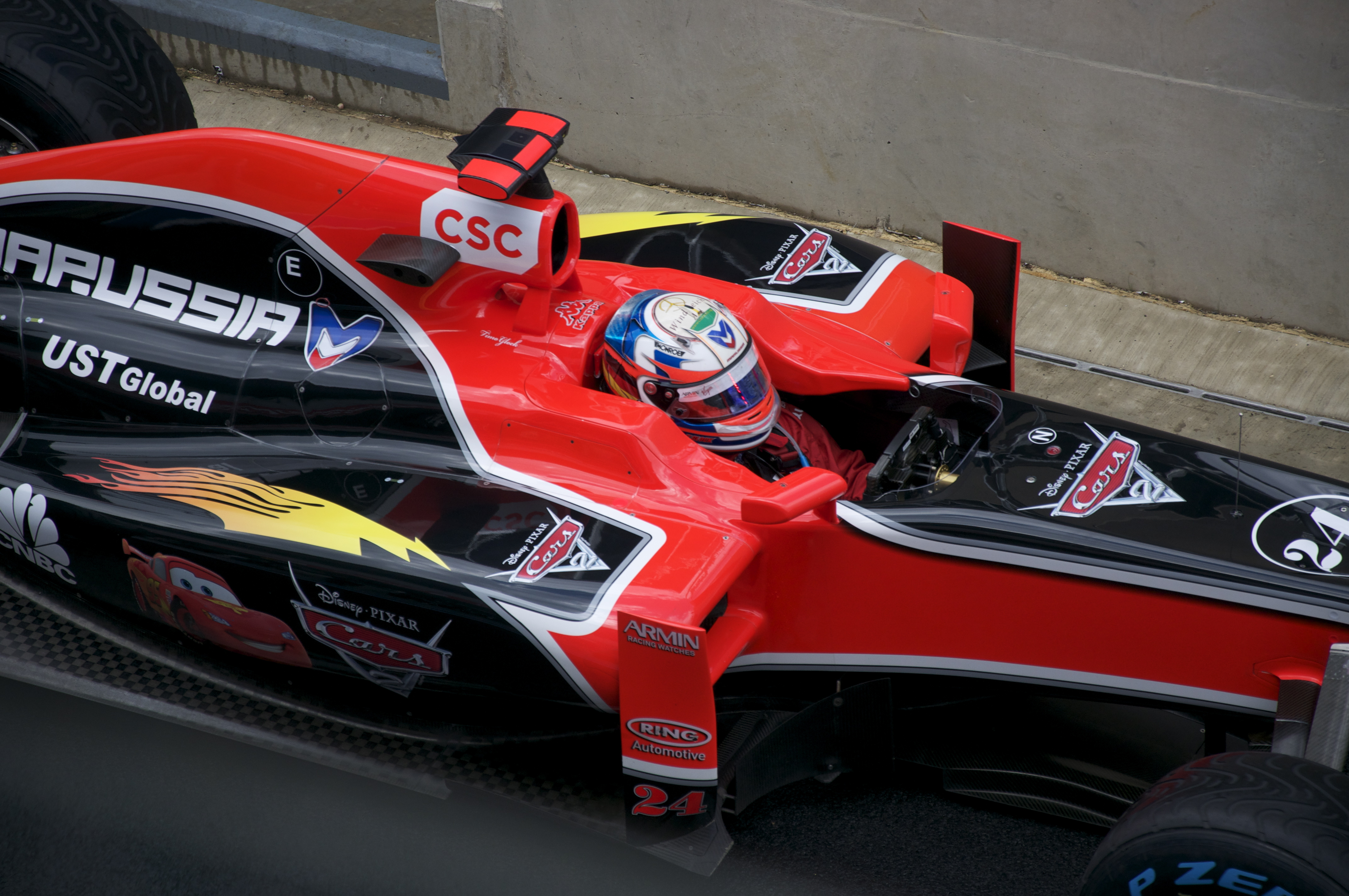
The livery of the MVR-02 included an advertisement for the film Cars 2 at the British Grand Prix - shown here on Glock's car.

The vehicle has a black livery with a wide red stripe.

At the British Grand Prix, the car ran with a special livery to promote the new film, Cars 2.

At the Italian Grand Prix, the cars featured the United States flag as a tribute and in memory of the 10th anniversary of the September 11 (9/11) terrorist attacks.

== Complete Formula One results ==
(key) (results in bold indicate pole position; results in italics indicate fastest lap)

| Year | Entrant | Engine | Tyres | Drivers | 1 | 2 | 3 | 4 | 5 | 6 | 7 | 8 | 9 | 10 | 11 | 12 | 13 | 14 | 15 | 16 | 17 | 18 | 19 | Points | WCC |
|---|---|---|---|---|---|---|---|---|---|---|---|---|---|---|---|---|---|---|---|---|---|---|---|---|---|
| 2011 | Marussia Virgin Racing | Cosworth CA2011 V8 | **P** | | AUS | MAL | CHN | TUR | ESP | MON | CAN | EUR | GBR | GER | HUN | BEL | ITA | SIN | JPN | KOR | IND | ABU | BRA | 0 | 12th |
| 2011 | Marussia Virgin Racing | Cosworth CA2011 V8 | **P** | Glock | NC | 16 | 21 | DNS | 19 | Ret | 15 | 21 | 16 | 17 | 17 | 18 | 15 | Ret | 20 | 18 | Ret | 19 | Ret | 0 | 12th |
| 2011 | Marussia Virgin Racing | Cosworth CA2011 V8 | **P** | d'Ambrosio | 14 | Ret | 20 | 20 | 20 | 15 | 14 | 22 | 17 | 18 | 19 | 17 | Ret | 18 | 21 | 20 | 16 | Ret | 19 | 0 | 12th |
