= 2011 Monaco Grand Prix =

Coordinates: 43°44′4.74″N 7°25′16.8″E

Race 6 of 19 in the 2011 Formula One World Championship
← Previous race	Next race →
- Circuit de Monaco

Race details
- Date: 29 May 2011
- Official name: Formula 1 Grand Prix de Monaco 2011
- Location: Circuit de Monaco
- Course: Street circuit
- Course length: 3.34 km (2.08 miles)
- Distance: 78 laps, 260.52 km (162.24 miles)
- Weather: Sunny, Fine and Dry; Air Temp 24 °C (75 °F); Track Temp 44 °C (111 °F)

Pole position
Driver	(Germany) Sebastian Vettel	Red Bull Racing-Renault
- Time: 1:13.556

Fastest lap
Driver	(Australia) Mark Webber	Red Bull Racing-Renault
- Time: 1:16.234 on lap 78

Podium
First	(Germany) Sebastian Vettel	Red Bull Racing-Renault
Second	(Spain) Fernando Alonso	Ferrari
Third	(United Kingdom) Jenson Button	McLaren-Mercedes

The 2011 Monaco Grand Prix, formally the Formula 1 Grand Prix de Monaco 2011, was held on 29 May 2011 at the Circuit de Monaco in Monte Carlo, Monaco. Sixth round of the 2011 Formula One season, the 78 lap race was won by the championship leader, Red Bull Racing's Sebastian Vettel who started from pole position. Ferrari's Fernando Alonso was second and McLaren's Jenson Button third.

Winner Vettel extended his lead in the World Drivers' Championship to 58 points over Lewis Hamilton who was sixth. Mark Webber finished fourth and maintained third place in the championship, six points behind Hamilton in third and three ahead of Button. In the World Constructors' Championship, Red Bull extended its lead over McLaren to 61 points, with Ferrari being a further 68 points behind.

== Report ==
=== Background ===
Many of the drivers were initially concerned that the Drag Reduction System (DRS) would prove to be unsafe on the narrow streets of the principality, and so lobbied to have the device banned for the duration of the weekend. Some elements of the paddock, including Williams objected to the ban, and use of the device was retained, with the DRS activation zone encompassing the front straight of the circuit, prompting Lewis Hamilton to comment that he did not think the 300 metres (980 ft) of space allowed for the DRS would promote much overtaking. Following increased pressure from the drivers and FOTA, the FIA agreed to ban the use of the DRS in the tunnel for free practice and qualifying.

Tyre supplier Pirelli brought its yellow-banded soft compound tyre as the harder "prime" tyre and the red-banded super-soft compound as the softer "option" compound, as opposed to the previous year where Bridgestone brought the medium compound as the "prime" tyre. The Monaco grand prix marked the debut of the Pirelli red-banded super-soft compound.

In the build-up to the race, Hispania Racing team principal Colin Kolles suggested that the team would submit an official protest to the FIA over the use of off-throttle blown diffusers. Hispania had planned for an upgrade that would include the device for the Spanish Grand Prix before the FIA declared off-throttle blown diffusers to be a moveable aerodynamic device, and therefore illegal. Hispania then proceeded to abandon the planned upgrade. However, the FIA reversed their decision shortly before the Spanish Grand Prix, instead nominating to discuss the matter with the sport's technical working group. Kolles declared that his team believed the off-throttle blown diffuser concept to be illegal, and was considering a protest before the Monaco Grand Prix.

Sebastian Vettel and Lewis Hamilton were first and second at the previous Grand Prix, the week before in Spain; and although they were also first and second in the Drivers' Championship at this point in the season - the gap was not as close as it was in the Grand Prix. Vettel's 4 wins from 5 races had given him 118 points, 41 more than Hamilton's 77 points. Third in the standings was Mark Webber, 10 behind on 67, and Jenson Button was 6 behind him on 61. Fernando Alonso was fifth with 51 points - less than half Vettel's total.

Red Bull Racing led the Constructors' Championship with 185 points and McLaren were second on 138 points (47 behind). Ferrari were third on 75 points and the battle for fourth raged on between Renault and Mercedes GP - who were on 46 and 40 points respectively. Before this race, Williams had had the worst start to a season in their history and were yet to score any points.

=== Qualifying ===
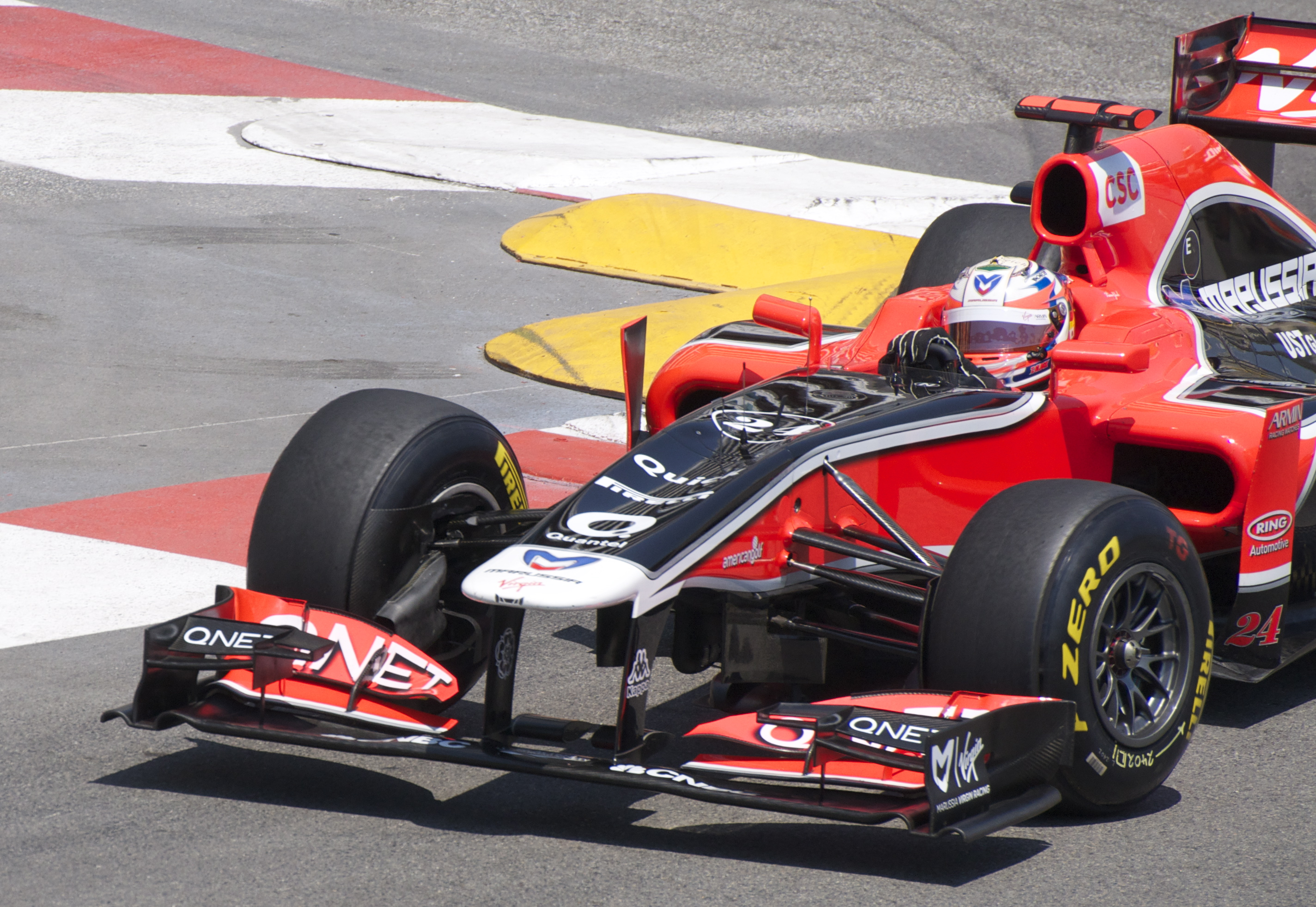
Timo Glock placed his Virgin MVR-02 21st in qualifying

In the third part of qualifying, Sergio Pérez crashed after exiting the tunnel, an accident similar to Nico Rosberg's in the earlier free practice session. However, Pérez was not so lucky as he smashed into the barrier used to separate the track and escape road, and qualifying had to be red flagged for more than half an hour, while Pérez was extricated from the car and the barrier was repaired. This meant that in the 2:26 time left, none of the remaining nine cars could improve their times due to the lack of heat and performance in their tyres. That meant that Vettel, who already had set the second fastest qualifying time in Monaco history, and Button who had set their times earlier in the session were better off than drivers who did not. Pérez's impact with the barrier was similar to Sauber driver Karl Wendlinger's crash in the run-up to the 1994 Monaco Grand Prix. As expected, the improved safety regulations resulted in Pérez's injuries being less severe, as he suffered a concussion and a sprained thigh.

Neither Hispania driver was able to record a lap time during the qualifying session; Liuzzi due to damage sustained during the earlier practice session, and Karthikeyan due to a gearbox and a rear suspension failure. However, in line with the 107% rule the team were allowed to enter the race due to posting competitive times during earlier free practice. Kamui Kobayashi and Jaime Alguersuari had also been called to the stewards' room after Kobayashi slowed down whilst coming into the pits, blocking Alguersuari who was on a flying lap in the first part of the session.

=== Race ===
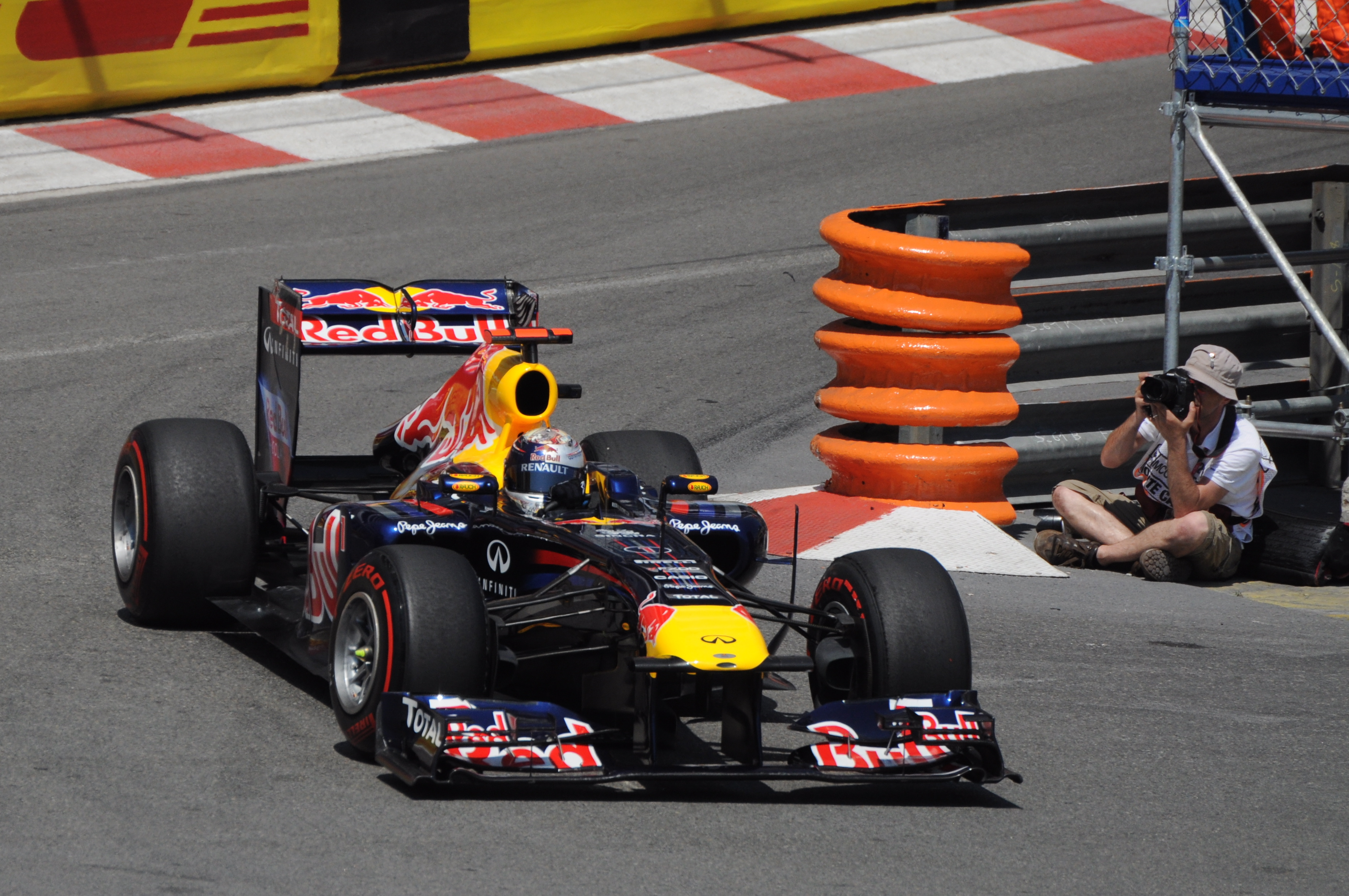
Sebastian Vettel won the race by a slim margin after being pressured all race by Fernando Alonso and Jenson Button

Vettel won the start from pole and led Button to the first corner, with Alonso getting around a slow starting Webber for third. Hamilton started ninth in the position vacated by Pérez but made little progress on the opening lap. Vettel went 2.4 seconds ahead of Button by the end of the first lap. Schumacher's anti-stall kicked in at the start dropping him to tenth at first corner, but he retook ninth from Hamilton at Grand-Hotel hairpin. Vettel continued to build a strong lead but his pit stop on lap 16 was slow and he was fitted with hard compound tyres due to a radio communication error. Alonso briefly led then but when he pitted on Lap 17 Button went to the lead. He stayed there until Lap 33 when he pitted and Vettel once again resumed the lead.

On lap 30 Glock's rear left suspension broke, so there were yellow flags for a brief period while they removed his car.

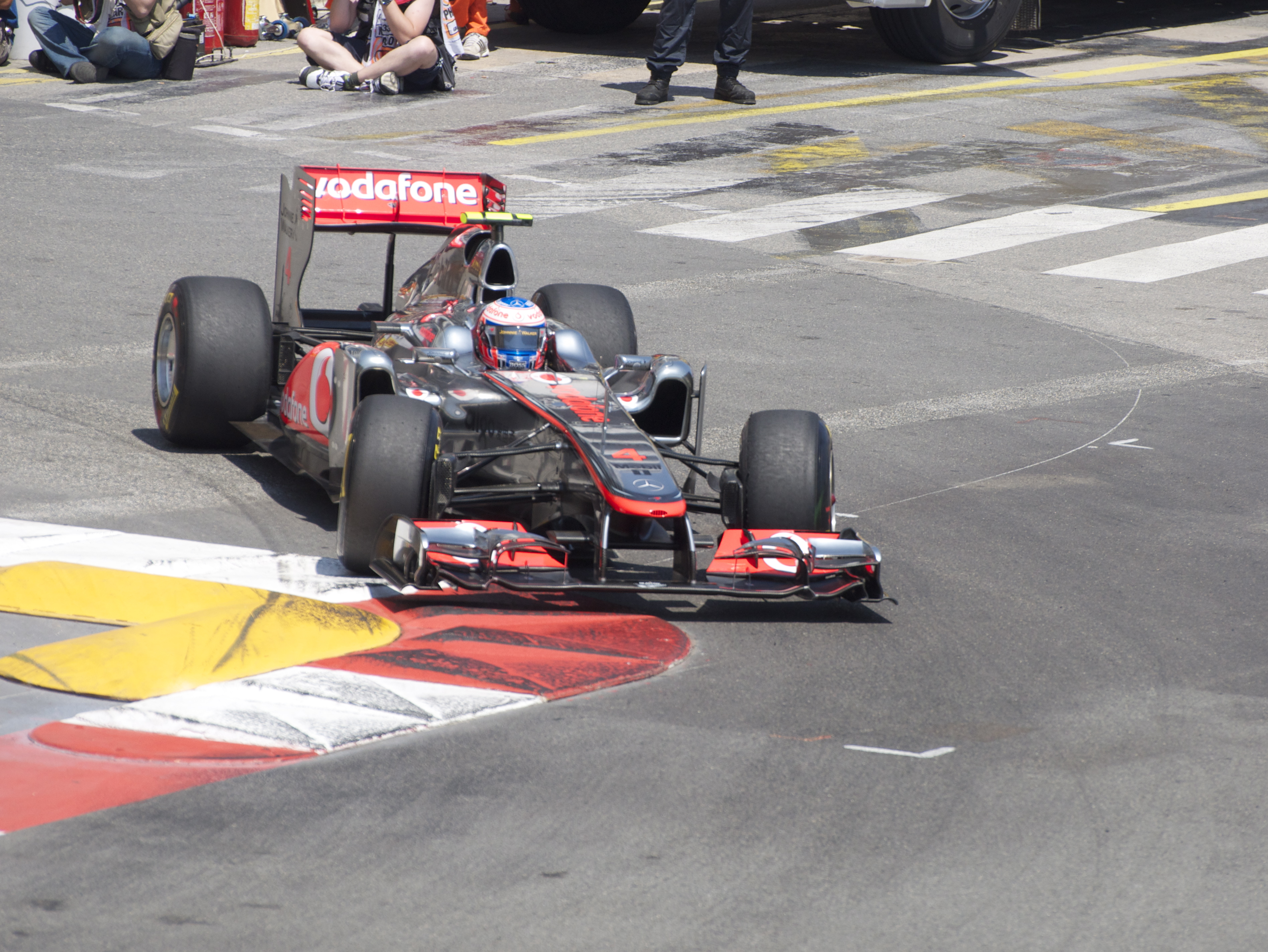
Jenson Button finished a close third after the top three battled towards the end of the Grand Prix

An incident between Hamilton and Massa caused Massa to crash in the tunnel, bringing out the first safety car. At the same time Schumacher's car suffered an airbox fire as he was about to pit, and he retired in the pit entrance forcing a safety car period while they cleared both cars. Vettel found himself leading behind the safety car and when racing resumed a battle between Vettel, Alonso and Button began. Vettel held the two former world champions behind him, despite being on tyres that had lasted since lap 16. As Button and Alonso fought for second place, the race looked set for an exciting climax, when an accident occurred involving Hamilton, Sutil, Alguersuari and Petrov. Sutil had hit the barrier on the previous corner, causing a right-rear puncture. Hamilton braked as Sutil lost control, and Alguersuari then ran into the back of Hamilton, damaging Hamilton's rear wing. Alguersuari hit the barrier, causing Petrov to do the same and both cars were out of the race, with Petrov being briefly trapped in his car. This brought out the safety car again and on lap 72 the race was red flagged, with the cars stopping on the grid at lap 72. During the red flag period, teams were allowed to change tyres and work on cars (unlike most motorsport, where tyre changes are not permitted during the red flag unless it is for a change of weather conditions). This worked to the advantage of Vettel, Alonso, and Hamilton. Vettel and Alonso had heavily used tyres, while Hamilton most likely would not have been able to finish the race with the damaged rear wing that required almost the entire red flag period to repair.

After Petrov was extracted from his car and the track cleared, the race resumed still behind the safety car, which went in at the end of lap 73. On lap 74 there was a brief yellow flag period due to an incident between Hamilton and Maldonado, ending Maldonado's race with a broken front suspension. Vettel took the chequered flag, extending his lead in the world championship to 58 points. Vettel was closely followed by Alonso in second, with Button taking the final podium spot.

Hamilton had a difficult day, being penalised for causing two avoidable accidents, one involving Massa (for which he was given a drive-through penalty), and another with Maldonado for which he received a post-race 20 second penalty which did not affect his sixth placing. In an interview with BBC Sport, Hamilton criticised the stewards after the race, saying "Out of six races, I've been to the stewards five times. It's a joke, it's an absolute frickin' joke." He later apologised.

== Classification ==
=== Qualifying ===
Pos	No	Driver	Constructor	Part 1	Part 2	Part 3	Grid
1	1	(Germany) Sebastian Vettel	Red Bull Racing-Renault	1:15.606	1:14.277	1:13.556	1
2	4	(United Kingdom) Jenson Button	McLaren-Mercedes	1:15.397	1:14.545	1:13.997	2
3	2	(Australia) Mark Webber	Red Bull Racing-Renault	1:16.087	1:14.742	1:14.019	3
4	5	(Spain) Fernando Alonso	Ferrari	1:16.051	1:14.569	1:14.483	4
5	7	(Germany) Michael Schumacher	Mercedes	1:16.092	1:14.981	1:14.682	5
6	6	(Brazil) Felipe Massa	Ferrari	1:16.309	1:14.648	1:14.877	6
7	8	(Germany) Nico Rosberg	Mercedes	1:15.858	1:14.741	1:15.766	7
8	12	(Venezuela) Pastor Maldonado	Williams-Cosworth	1:15.819	1:15.545	1:16.528	8
9	3	(United Kingdom) Lewis Hamilton	McLaren-Mercedes	1:15.207	1:14.275	no time	9^{1}
10	17	(Mexico) Sergio Pérez	Sauber-Ferrari	1:15.918	1:15.482	no time	DNS^{2}
11	10	(Russia) Vitaly Petrov	Renault	1:16.378	1:15.815		10
12	11	(Brazil) Rubens Barrichello	Williams-Cosworth	1:16.616	1:15.826		11
13	16	(Japan) Kamui Kobayashi	Sauber-Ferrari	1:16.513	1:15.973		12
14	15	(United Kingdom) Paul di Resta	Force India-Mercedes	1:16.813	1:16.118		13
15	14	(Germany) Adrian Sutil	Force India-Mercedes	1:16.600	1:16.121		14
16	9	(Germany) Nick Heidfeld	Renault	1:16.681	1:16.214		15
17	18	(Switzerland) Sébastien Buemi	Toro Rosso-Ferrari	1:16.358	1:16.300		16
18	20	(Finland) Heikki Kovalainen	Lotus-Renault	1:17.343			17
19	21	(Italy) Jarno Trulli	Lotus-Renault	1:17.381			18
20	19	(Spain) Jaime Alguersuari	Toro Rosso-Ferrari	1:17.820			19
21	24	(Germany) Timo Glock	Virgin-Cosworth	1:17.914			20
22	25	(Belgium) Jérôme d'Ambrosio	Virgin-Cosworth	1:18.736			21
107% time: 1:20.471
23	22	(India) Narain Karthikeyan	HRT-Cosworth	no time			22^{3}
24	23	(Italy) Vitantonio Liuzzi	HRT-Cosworth	no time			23^{3}

1. – Lewis Hamilton had his only Q3 time of 1:15.280 deleted for cutting the chicane, demoting him from 7th to 9th on the grid. But despite making it into the top 10, he was allowed to choose whatever tyre he wanted to start on.
2. – Sergio Pérez was injured and deemed unfit for the race by doctors after crashing heavily at the Nouvelle Chicane in the final period of qualifying. Everyone else moved up one position on the grid to fill his place.
3. – Vitantonio Liuzzi and Narain Karthikeyan failed to set a lap time in qualifying after both cars were damaged in free practice. However, both cars set a practice time within the 107% standard during the final practice session, and the stewards allowed both drivers to race.

=== Race ===
Pos	No	Driver	Constructor	Laps	Time/Retired	Grid	Points
1	1	(Germany) Sebastian Vettel	Red Bull Racing-Renault	78	2:09:38.373	1	25
2	5	(Spain) Fernando Alonso	Ferrari	78	+1.138	4	18
3	4	(United Kingdom) Jenson Button	McLaren-Mercedes	78	+2.378	2	15
4	2	(Australia) Mark Webber	Red Bull Racing-Renault	78	+23.101	3	12
5	16	(Japan) Kamui Kobayashi	Sauber-Ferrari	78	+26.916	12	10
6	3	(United Kingdom) Lewis Hamilton	McLaren-Mercedes	78	+47.210^{1}	9	8
7	14	(Germany) Adrian Sutil	Force India-Mercedes	77	+1 Lap	14	6
8	9	(Germany) Nick Heidfeld	Renault	77	+1 Lap	15	4
9	11	(Brazil) Rubens Barrichello	Williams-Cosworth	77	+1 Lap	11	2
10	18	(Switzerland) Sébastien Buemi	Toro Rosso-Ferrari	77	+1 Lap	16	1
11	8	(Germany) Nico Rosberg	Mercedes	76	+2 Laps	7	
12	15	(United Kingdom) Paul di Resta	Force India-Mercedes	76	+2 Laps	13	
13	21	(Italy) Jarno Trulli	Lotus-Renault	76	+2 Laps	18	
14	20	(Finland) Heikki Kovalainen	Lotus-Renault	76	+2 Laps	17	
15	25	(Belgium) Jérôme d'Ambrosio	Virgin-Cosworth	75	+3 Laps	21	
16	23	(Italy) Vitantonio Liuzzi	HRT-Cosworth	75	+3 Laps	23	
17	22	(India) Narain Karthikeyan	HRT-Cosworth	74	+4 Laps	22	
18	12	(Venezuela) Pastor Maldonado	Williams-Cosworth	73	Collision^{2}	8	
Ret	10	(Russia) Vitaly Petrov	Renault	67	Collision	10	
Ret	19	(Spain) Jaime Alguersuari	Toro Rosso-Ferrari	66	Collision	19	
Ret	6	(Brazil) Felipe Massa	Ferrari	32	Collision	6	
Ret	7	(Germany) Michael Schumacher	Mercedes	32	Fire	5	
Ret	24	(Germany) Timo Glock	Virgin-Cosworth	30	Suspension	20	
DNS	17	(Mexico) Sergio Pérez	Sauber-Ferrari	0	Injured	–	

Notes:

1. – Lewis Hamilton was given a 20-second penalty post-race, for causing an avoidable collision with Pastor Maldonado, but he didn't lose any place after receiving it.
2. – Pastor Maldonado crashed at Sainte Dévote on lap 73 after a collision with Lewis Hamilton, but he was classified as he had completed more than 90% of the winner's distance.

== Championship standings after the race ==
Drivers' Championship standings

Pos.	Driver	Points
1	(Germany) Sebastian Vettel	143
2	(United Kingdom) Lewis Hamilton	85
3	(Australia) Mark Webber	79
4	(United Kingdom) Jenson Button	76
5	(Spain) Fernando Alonso	69

Constructors' Championship standings

Pos.	Constructor	Points
1	(Austria) Red Bull Racing-Renault	222
2	(United Kingdom) McLaren-Mercedes	161
3	(Italy) Ferrari	93
4	(United Kingdom) Renault	50
5	(Germany) Mercedes	40

- Note: Only the top five positions are included for both sets of standings.

== See also ==
- 2011 Monaco GP2 Series round

Previous race: 2011 Spanish Grand Prix	FIA Formula One World Championship; 2011 season	Next race: 2011 Canadian Grand Prix
Previous race: 2010 Monaco Grand Prix	Monaco Grand Prix	Next race: 2012 Monaco Grand Prix
