= List of Formula One race records =

This is a list of race records in the FIA Formula One World Championship since 1950.

This page is accurate as of the 2026 Las Vegas Grand Prix.

== Race records ==
| Description | Record | Details | Ref. |
|---|---|---|---|
| Most retirements (percentage) | 85.7% | 1996 Monaco Grand Prix (18 out of 21 starters) | |
| Fewest finishers (actual) | 3 | 1996 Monaco Grand Prix (21 starters. Seven cars were classified, only three crossed the finish line) | |
| Fewest finishers (classified) | 4 | 1966 Monaco Grand Prix (16 starters) | |
| Most finishers | 24 | (Spain) 2011 European Grand Prix (24 starters) | |
| Most pit stops | 89 | (Netherlands) 2023 Dutch Grand Prix | |
| Fewest pit stops | 0 | (Netherlands) 1961 Dutch Grand Prix (Belgium) 2021 Belgian Grand Prix | |
| Most overtakes for the lead | 41 | (Italy) 1965 Italian Grand Prix | |
| Most overtakes in a dry race | 352 | (United States) 2026 Las Vegas Grand Prix | |
| Most overtakes in a wet race | 186 | (Netherlands) 2023 Dutch Grand Prix | |
| Most overtakes in a single lap | 63 | (Netherlands) 2023 Dutch Grand Prix (lap 3) | |
| Fewest overtakes in a race | 0 | 2003 Monaco Grand Prix; 2005 United States Grand Prix (Spain) 2009 European Grand Prix; 2021 Monaco Grand Prix (Note: It is disputed if the number of overtakes at the 2021 Monaco Grand Prix is zero or one.) (Belgium) 2021 Belgian Grand Prix | |
| Most starters | 34 | (Germany) 1953 German Grand Prix | |
| Fewest starters | 6 | 2005 United States Grand Prix (20 cars took warmup lap, but 14 cars pulled out before the start) | |
| Smallest winning margin | 0.010 s | (Italy) 1971 Italian Grand Prix ( (United Kingdom) Peter Gethin from (Sweden) Ronnie Peterson) also closest 1st–3rd (0.090 s); 1st–4th (0.180 s); 1st–5th (0.610 s) | |
| Largest winning margin (laps) | 2 laps | (Spain) 1969 Spanish Grand Prix ( (United Kingdom) Jackie Stewart from (New Zealand) Bruce McLaren) (Australia) 1995 Australian Grand Prix ( (United Kingdom) Damon Hill from (France) Olivier Panis) | |
| Largest winning margin (time) | 5 min 12.750 s | (Portugal) 1958 Portuguese Grand Prix ( (United Kingdom) Stirling Moss from (United Kingdom) Mike Hawthorn) | |
| Lowest average race speed (winner) | 53.583 km/h (33.295 mph) | (Japan) 2022 Japanese Grand Prix ( (Netherlands) Max Verstappen) (Race stopped twice. Firstly, due to rain and (Spain) Carlos Sainz Jr.'s crash. Secondly, as three-hour time limit reached, after which the race was not restarted) | |
| Lowest average race speed (winner) without a red flag | 98.701 km/h (61.330 mph) | 1950 Monaco Grand Prix ( (Argentina) Juan Manuel Fangio) | |
| Highest average race speed (winner) | 250.706 km/h (155.781 mph) | (Italy) 2025 Italian Grand Prix ( (Netherlands) Max Verstappen) | |
| Highest average fastest lap (race) | 257.781 km/h (160.178 mph) | (Italy) 2025 Italian Grand Prix ( (United Kingdom) Lando Norris) | |
| Highest average lap speed (qualifying) | 264.681 km/h (164.465 mph) | (Italy) 2025 Italian Grand Prix ( (Netherlands) Max Verstappen) | |
| Highest top speed (race) | 372.499 km/h (231.46 mph) (Note: Williams made the unverified claim of a top speed of 373.303 km/h (231.96 mph).) | (Mexico) 2016 Mexican Grand Prix ( (Finland) Valtteri Bottas) | |
| Highest top speed (overall) | 378 km/h (234.878 mph) (Note: This is an unrecognised claim made by Williams.) | (Azerbaijan) 2016 European Grand Prix ( (Finland) Valtteri Bottas) | |
| Shortest lap time (qualifying) | 53.377 s | (Bahrain) 2020 Sakhir Grand Prix ( (Finland) Valtteri Bottas) | |
| Shortest race (laps, duration, distance) | 1 lap, 3 min 27.071 s 6.880 km (4.275 mi) | (Belgium) 2021 Belgian Grand Prix (Race red-flagged due to heavy rain) | |
| Shortest full-length race (duration) | 1 h 13 min 24.325 s | (Italy) 2025 Italian Grand Prix | |
| Shortest race (laps) excluding red flags | 12 | (Germany) 1971 German Grand Prix | |
| Longest race (duration) | 4 h 4 min 39.540 s | (Canada) 2011 Canadian Grand Prix (Race stopped for 2 hours due to heavy rain) | |
| Longest race without a red flag (duration) | 3 h 57 min 38.050 s | (United States) 1951 Indianapolis 500 | |
| Longest race (laps, distance) | 200 laps, 804.672 km (500 mi) | (United States) 1951, 1952, 1953, 1954, 1955, 1956, 1957, 1958, 1959, 1960 Indianapolis 500 | |
| Longest non-Indianapolis 500 race (distance) | 77 laps, 601.832 km (373.961 mi) | (France) 1951 French Grand Prix | |
| Longest non-Indianapolis 500 race (laps) | 87 laps, 307.995 km (191.379 mi) | (Bahrain) 2020 Sakhir Grand Prix | |
| Most times safety car deployed in single race | 6 times | (Canada) 2011 Canadian Grand Prix | |
| Most red flags in qualifying | 6 | 2025 Azerbaijan Grand Prix (Incidents of (Thailand) Alexander Albon, (Germany) Nico Hülkenberg, (France) Pierre Gasly, (Argentina) Franco Colapinto, (United Kingdom) Oliver Bearman, (Monaco) Charles Leclerc, and (Australia) Oscar Piastri) | |
| Most red flags in the race | 3 | (Australia) 2023 Australian Grand Prix (Incidents of (Thailand) Alexander Albon, (Denmark) Kevin Magnussen, (United States) Logan Sargeant, (Netherlands) Nyck de Vries, (France) Esteban Ocon, and (France) Pierre Gasly) | |
| Closest result in a qualifying session | 0.000 s between P1 and P3 | (Spain) 1997 European Grand Prix ( (Canada) Jacques Villeneuve, (Germany) Michael Schumacher, and (Germany) Heinz-Harald Frentzen all set identical qualifying lap times) | |
| Closest result in a qualifying session | 0.000 s between P1 and P2 | (Canada) 2024 Canadian Grand Prix ( (United Kingdom) George Russell and (Netherlands) Max Verstappen both set identical qualifying lap times) | |
| Biggest gap between pole and second position | 10.9 s | (Germany) 1968 German Grand Prix ( (Belgium) Jacky Ickx, (New Zealand) Chris Amon) | |
| Biggest gap between pole and second position (percentage) | 2.430% (1.919 s) | (United Kingdom) 1992 British Grand Prix ( (United Kingdom) Nigel Mansell, (Italy) Riccardo Patrese) | |
| Most pit stops by a winning driver in a single race | 6 (Note: Including one penalty for Jenson Button.) | (United Kingdom) Jenson Button ( (Canada) 2011 Canadian Grand Prix) (Netherlands) Max Verstappen ( (Netherlands) 2023 Dutch Grand Prix) | |
| Most (driving) penalties in one race | 5 | (France) Esteban Ocon ( (Austria) 2023 Austrian Grand Prix) | |
| Most grid-place (engine) penalties for one race | 80 | (Brazil) Gabriel Bortoleto ( 2026 United States Grand Prix) | |
| Youngest average age of podium finishers | 23 years, 256 days | (Brazil) 2019 Brazilian Grand Prix ( (Netherlands) Max Verstappen, (France) Pierre Gasly, (Spain) Carlos Sainz Jr.) | |
| Oldest average age of podium finishers | 46 years, 263 days | (Switzerland) 1950 Swiss Grand Prix ( (Italy) Giuseppe Farina, (Italy) Luigi Fagioli, (France) Louis Rosier) | |
| Biggest age gap between two drivers in a single race | 34 years, 10 months, and 9 days | (France) 1952 French Grand Prix (between (France) Philippe Étancelin and (United Kingdom) Peter Collins) | |
| Most races in a season | 24 | 2024, 2025 | |
| Fewest races in a season | 7 | 1950, 1955 | |
| Coldest race (air temperature) | 5 °C | (Canada) 1978 Canadian Grand Prix | |
| Hottest race (air temperature) | 42.5 °C | 2005 Bahrain Grand Prix | |
| Highest Grand Prix attendance (race weekend) | 564,000 | (United Kingdom) 2026 British Grand Prix | |
| Highest Grand Prix attendance (race) | 250,000 | 2000 United States Grand Prix | |

== See also ==
- Formula One
- Formula One regulations
- FIA
- List of Formula One fatalities
- List of Formula One circuits
- List of Formula One driver records
- List of Formula One constructor records
- List of Formula One engine records
- List of Formula One tyre records
