= 2011 Canadian Grand Prix =

Formula One motor race held in 2011 in Canada

Race 7 of 19 in the 2011 Formula One World Championship
← Previous race	Next race →

Race details
- Date: 12 June 2011
- Official name: Formula 1 Grand Prix du Canada 2011
- Location: Circuit Gilles Villeneuve, Montreal, Quebec, Canada
- Course: Street circuit
- Course length: 4.361 km (2.710 miles)
- Distance: 70 laps, 305.270 km (189.686 miles)
- Weather: Wet at start, very heavy rain later, after rain stops, track drying towards the end. Temperatures up to 27 °C (81 °F); wind speeds up to 12 kilometres per hour (7.5 mph)

Pole position
Driver	(Germany) Sebastian Vettel	Red Bull Racing-Renault
- Time: 1:13.014

Fastest lap
Driver	(United Kingdom) Jenson Button	McLaren-Mercedes
- Time: 1:16.956 on lap 69

Podium
First	(United Kingdom) Jenson Button	McLaren-Mercedes
Second	(Germany) Sebastian Vettel	Red Bull Racing-Renault
Third	(Australia) Mark Webber	Red Bull Racing-Renault

The 2011 Canadian Grand Prix (formally the Formula 1 Grand Prix du Canada 2011) was a Formula One motor race held on 12 June 2011 at the Circuit Gilles Villeneuve, in Montreal, Quebec, Canada. It was the seventh race of the 2011 Formula One World Championship and the 48th Canadian Grand Prix. McLaren driver Jenson Button won the 70-lap race starting from seventh position. Sebastian Vettel, who started from pole position, finished second for Red Bull Racing with teammate Mark Webber finishing third.

The race began behind the safety car, and, once it returned to the pit lane, Vettel built a lead over Fernando Alonso. A second safety car deployment caused by the collision of Button and teammate Lewis Hamilton closed the time gaps between cars, but Vettel retained the lead. By lap 26, increasingly heavy rain led to the race's suspension, before it was restarted over two hours later. Button was involved in another collision on lap 37, which led to Alonso's retirement and Button falling to last place. Over the remainder of the race, he moved from twenty-first place to first, passing Webber and Michael Schumacher, who had started fourth and eighth respectively, for second place on lap 65, and Vettel on the final lap.

The victory was Button's first of the season, and put him into second place in the World Drivers' Championship, sixty points behind leader Vettel, who had extended his lead despite finishing second. Webber remained in third, and Hamilton's retirement meant he slipped to fourth. In the World Constructors' Championship Red Bull extended their lead to 65 points from McLaren, with Ferrari a further 85 points behind. At over four hours (including a red flag period) the race set the record as the longest in Formula One history.

== Background ==
The 2011 Canadian Grand Prix was the seventh of 19 rounds in the 2011 Formula One World Championship and took place at the 4.361 km (2.710 mi) Circuit Gilles Villeneuve, Montreal, Quebec on 12 June 2011. The Grand Prix was contested by twelve teams, each of two drivers. The teams, also known as constructors, were Red Bull Racing, McLaren, Ferrari, Mercedes, Renault, Williams, Force India, Sauber, Toro Rosso, Lotus, HRT and Virgin. Tyre supplier Pirelli brought four different tyre types to the race: two dry compounds, the yellow-banded soft "primes" and the red-banded super-soft "options"; and two wet-weather compounds, the intermediate and full wet. The drag reduction system (DRS) had two activation zones for the race; one was on the straight between turns 11 and 13, and the second on the start/finish straight from the final to first corners.

Going into the race, Red Bull driver Sebastian Vettel led the World Drivers' Championship with 143 points, ahead of Lewis Hamilton on 85 points and Mark Webber on 79. Jenson Button was fourth with 76 points while Fernando Alonso was fifth on 69 points. In the World Constructors' Championship Red Bull were leading with 222 points, McLaren and Ferrari were second and third with 161 and 93 points respectively, while Renault with 50 and Mercedes with 40 points contended for fourth place. Red Bull and Sebastian Vettel had so far dominated the championship, winning five out of the six previous races, with Lewis Hamilton winning the Chinese Grand Prix. Championship contenders Webber and Button had gained one second-place finish each, and Alonso, Vitaly Petrov and Nick Heidfeld had achieved third place podium finishes.

Prior to the event Virgin Racing announced they would end their partnership with Wirth Research, the company responsible for designing and developing the team's racing cars. In order to cut costs, Wirth Research had designed the cars exclusively using computational fluid dynamics, and unlike their competitors Wirth had not utilised a wind tunnel. The approach was not successful as the team had failed to qualify higher than 20th so far in the season, leading to the partnership's conclusion. Virgin Racing's CEO Andy Webb, who had aims to challenge for a podium position at the inaugural Russian Grand Prix, expressed that ending the partnership would mean "that the team will take greater control of its own destiny". Wirth Research would continue to develop the car until the end of the 2011 season, while Virgin Racing would up their own technical department under the control of former Renault Director of Engineering Pat Symonds.

Several teams made major technical updates to their cars for the Grand Prix. McLaren and Ferrari altered the brake ducts on their cars, improving the cooling to manage the high brake temperatures encountered in Montreal. Ferrari and Mercedes revised their rear suspension layouts, while Red Bull brought a new front wing optimised for lower downforce. Renault and Williams brought new rear wings, which were designed specifically for low-downforce circuits such as Circuit Gilles Villeneuve, where the race was held.

== Practice ==
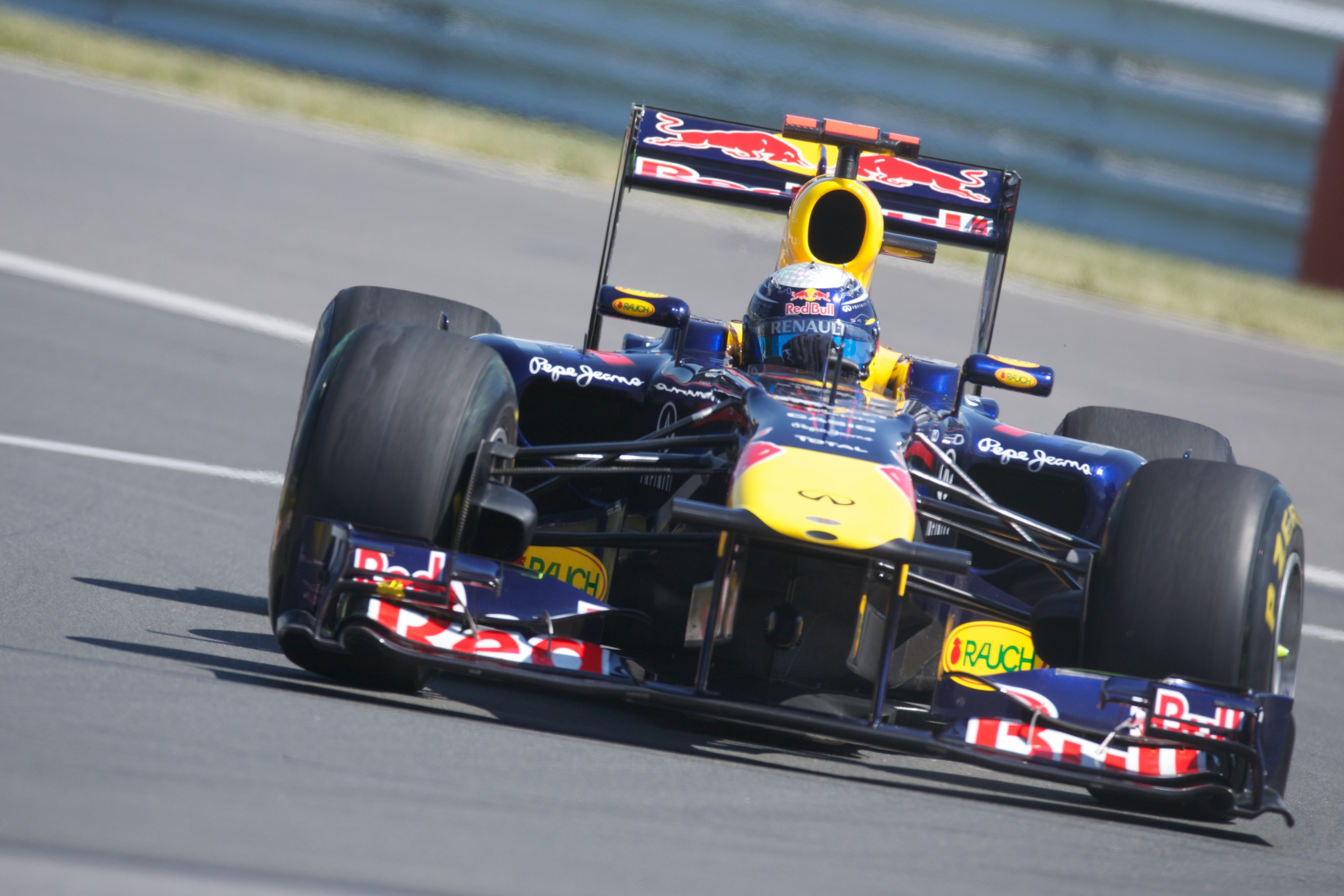
Vettel achieved his sixth pole position in seven races, and the 21st in his career.

Three practice sessions were held before the race; two 90-minute sessions on Friday and one lasting an hour on Saturday. Nico Rosberg was the fastest driver in the first practice session, ahead of Alonso and Mercedes driver Michael Schumacher. Vettel caused the session to be suspended after crashing into the circuit's "Wall of Champions" on the last corner, heavily damaging his car. After the morning session Sergio Pérez, who had suffered from concussion after a crash at the previous race, withdrew from the Grand Prix. Although he had passed the FIA's medical examination, Pérez said that "I only want to drive when I'm a hundred per cent well. I need some more time to recover". He was replaced by McLaren's reserve driver Pedro de la Rosa, who had competed for Sauber in 2010. Alonso was fastest in the second session, ahead of Vettel, Massa and Hamilton – although the McLaren driver received a puncture midway through practice. The session was disrupted by incidents as Kamui Kobayashi and Jérôme d'Ambrosio struck the barriers – both accidents requiring a suspension as marshals cleared the track of debris – and Adrian Sutil's Force India broke its suspension in a crash at turn 7. The third session on Saturday morning saw Vettel fastest, ahead of Alonso, Rosberg and Massa. A KERS failure on Webber's RB7 prevented him from participating. A crash by de la Rosa in the final minute brought out a red flag, and the session was prematurely ended due to the limited time remaining.

== Qualifying ==
The qualifying session on Saturday afternoon was split into three parts. The first part ran for 20 minutes and eliminated the cars from qualifying that finished the session 18th or lower. During this session, the 107% rule was in effect, which necessitated each driver set a time within 107% of the quickest lap to qualify for the race. The second part of qualifying lasted 15 minutes and eliminated cars that finished in positions 11 to 17. The final part of qualifying determined the positions from first to tenth, and decided pole position.

Vettel achieved his sixth pole position of the season, and his first at the Circuit Gilles Villeneuve, with a time of 1 minute and 13.014 seconds. He was joined on the front row of the grid by Alonso, with teammate Massa in third, giving Ferrari their best qualifying performance of the season. Webber had not been able to use his car's KERS and qualified fourth, four-tenths of a second behind Vettel. Hamilton and Button qualified in fifth and seventh respectively and McLaren blamed the slow pace on too high levels of downforce on the high-speed circuit. The Mercedes drivers qualified in sixth and eighth, and Heidfeld and Petrov completed the top ten. Paul di Resta was in 11th position, ahead of fellow rookie Pastor Maldonado and Kobayashi. Sutil struggled with grip throughout the session and was 14th; following him were Sébastien Buemi, Barrichello and de la Rosa. Jaime Alguersuari qualifying in 18th complained of insufficient grip and brake balance, and at the back of the grid were the Lotus, HRT and Virgin drivers. D'Ambrosio did not qualify after failing to set a time within 107% in the first qualifying session. However the stewards allowed him to race, having considered he was using a new chassis after an accident in Friday practice, where he had set faster lap times.

=== Qualifying classification ===
The fastest lap in each of the three sessions is denoted in bold.

Pos.	No.	Driver	Constructor	Q1	Q2	Q3	Grid
1	1	(Germany) Sebastian Vettel	Red Bull Racing-Renault	1:14.011	1:13.486	**1:13.014**	1
2	5	(Spain) Fernando Alonso	Ferrari	**1:13.822**	1:13.672	1:13.199	2
3	6	(Brazil) Felipe Massa	Ferrari	1:14.026	**1:13.431**	1:13.217	3
4	2	(Australia) Mark Webber	Red Bull Racing-Renault	1:14.375	1:13.654	1:13.429	4
5	3	(United Kingdom) Lewis Hamilton	McLaren-Mercedes	1:14.114	1:13.926	1:13.565	5
6	8	(Germany) Nico Rosberg	Mercedes	1:14.920	1:13.950	1:13.814	6
7	4	(United Kingdom) Jenson Button	McLaren-Mercedes	1:14.374	1:13.955	1:13.838	7
8	7	(Germany) Michael Schumacher	Mercedes	1:14.970	1:14.242	1:13.864	8
9	9	(Germany) Nick Heidfeld	Renault	1:15.096	1:14.467	1:14.062	9
10	10	(Russia) Vitaly Petrov	Renault	1:14.699	1:14.354	1:14.085	10
11	15	(United Kingdom) Paul di Resta	Force India-Mercedes	1:14.874	1:14.752		11
12	12	(Venezuela) Pastor Maldonado	Williams-Cosworth	1:15.585	1:15.043		12
13	16	(Japan) Kamui Kobayashi	Sauber-Ferrari	1:15.694	1:15.285		13
14	14	(Germany) Adrian Sutil	Force India-Mercedes	1:14.931	1:15.287		14
15	18	(Switzerland) Sébastien Buemi	Toro Rosso-Ferrari	1:15.901	1:15.334		15
16	11	(Brazil) Rubens Barrichello	Williams-Cosworth	1:15.331	1:15.361		16
17	17	(Spain) Pedro de la Rosa	Sauber-Ferrari	1:16.229	1:15.587		17
18	19	(Spain) Jaime Alguersuari	Toro Rosso-Ferrari	1:16.294			PL^{1}
19	21	(Italy) Jarno Trulli	Lotus-Renault	1:16.745			18
20	20	(Finland) Heikki Kovalainen	Lotus-Renault	1:16.786			19
21	23	(Italy) Vitantonio Liuzzi	HRT-Cosworth	1:18.424			20
22	24	(Germany) Timo Glock	Virgin-Cosworth	1:18.537			21
23	22	(India) Narain Karthikeyan	HRT-Cosworth	1:18.574			22
107% time: 1:18.989
24	25	(Belgium) Jérôme d'Ambrosio	Virgin-Cosworth	1:19.414			23^{2}

Notes

1. – Jaime Alguersuari was required to start from the pit lane, as he modified his Toro Rosso's set-up to optimise the car for the wet conditions.
2. – Jérôme d'Ambrosio did not set a lap time within 107% of the fastest qualifying time from the first session, but was allowed to race by the stewards' discretion.

== Race ==
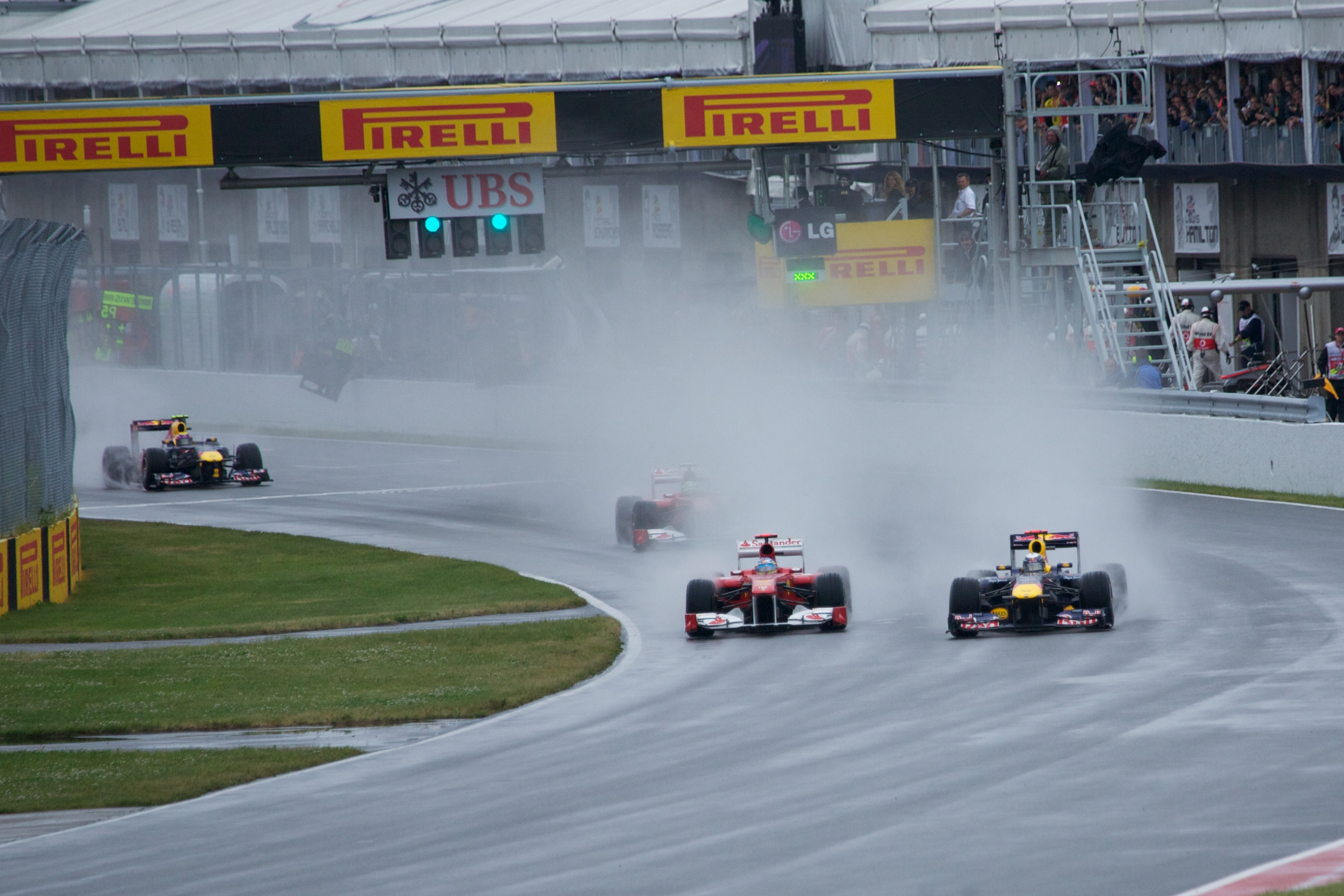
Alonso attacked Vettel after the first safety car period (shortly after the safety car came in). Although it had not rained at this stage of the race, the track was still wet from earlier rain and the spray impaired drivers' visibility.

The track was wet before the race, as rain showers had hit the area throughout the day. The race was due to start at 13:00 local time (UTC−4), and heavy rain was expected to arrive an hour into the race. The air temperature ranged between 17–19 °C (63–66 °F), with the track temperature between 18–20 °C (64–68 °F). Standing water on the track, which was causing heavy spray and impairing visibility, meant that the race would start behind the safety car and all cars would use the full wet tyres. Alguersuari would start the race from the pitlane, as he modified his Toro Rosso's set-up to optimise the car for the wet conditions.

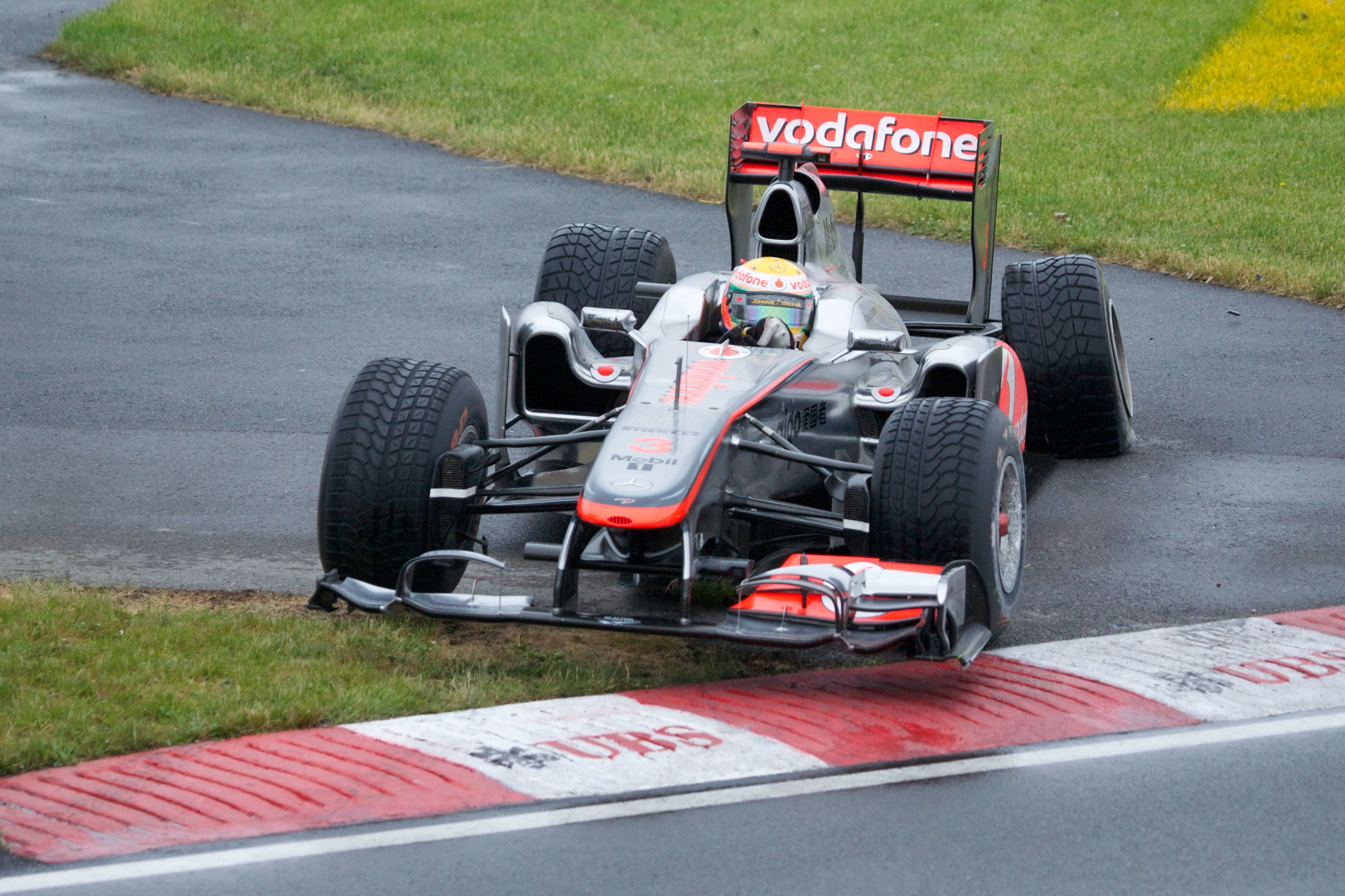
After his collision with Button and the pitwall, Hamilton tried to keep his car going but was forced to stop beside the track.

The race began behind the safety car, with no formation lap, and despite the slow speed drivers struggled for grip on the wet surface. The safety car came into the pit lane after five laps, and the cars were allowed to overtake. Vettel retained first place withstanding Alonso's attempts to pass, while behind Hamilton and Webber collided at the first corner – dropping the drivers to seventh and fourteenth respectively. Button lost fifth place mid-lap after running wide, losing two places to Schumacher and Hamilton. At the end of the first racing lap, di Resta had moved up to eighth position, followed by Heidfeld and Kobayashi, who made three places off the grid. Vettel extended his lead over the next lap, while the positions behind continued to change. Kobayashi had improved to eighth and Webber recovered to twelfth, while di Resta fell back to thirteenth. Hamilton lost sixth position running wide on a failed overtaking move on Schumacher, and fell behind Button. He attempted an overtake on the pit straight, but the two drivers collided and Hamilton hit the pit wall. The accident caused Hamilton's retirement, which prompted a safety car deployment at the end of lap eight.

The race was resumed on lap 13 and Button, who had changed to intermediate tyres before the safety car period, was given a drive-through penalty for speeding behind the safety car, emerging in 15th place. Vettel began to enlarge his lead over Alonso and Massa in second and third. Alonso and the Mercedes pitted for intermediate tyres, leaving Massa in second and Kobayashi in third by lap 17. Barrichello, who switched for intermediates as the safety car came in, began setting times at the same pace as the leaders, and gained 15th position as the drivers in front changed tyres. On lap 19, a rain storm arrived at the circuit, forcing the drivers on intermediate tyres to switch back to full wets. Alonso and Button, who were in fifth and eighth respectively, fell to ninth and eleventh, while the drivers on the full wet tyres began pitting for fresh wet tyres. The safety car was brought out on lap 20 due to the intensity of the rain, and Vettel, Webber, Massa and Buemi, who had not changed tyres, went to the pitlane for fresh full wets. After six laps under the safety car, the conditions were getting worse, and the race was suspended.

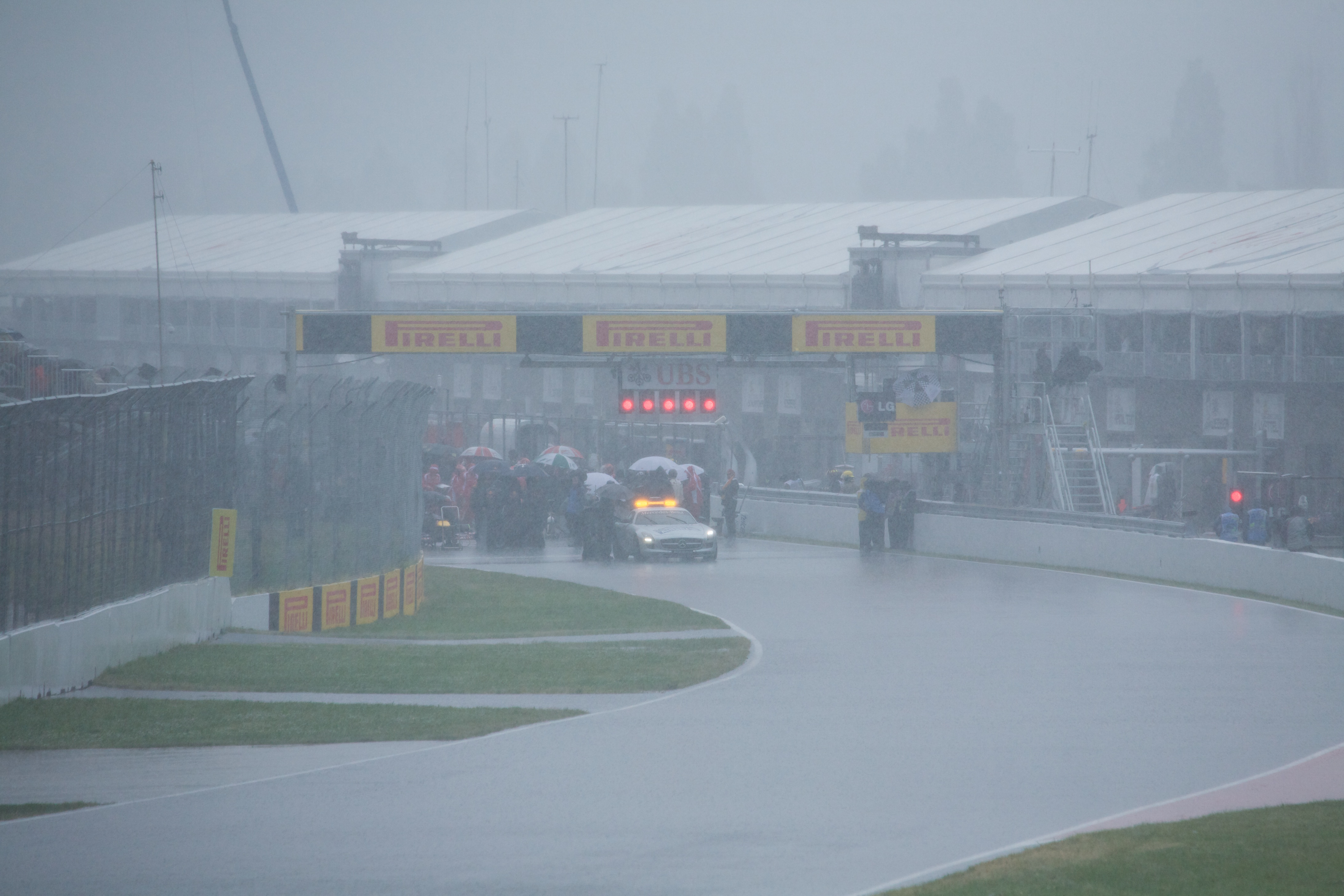
Heavy rain hit the circuit forty minutes into the race. Initially the FIA tried to keep the race going behind the safety car, but the track conditions were undriveable and the race was suspended.

Torrential rain prevented the resumption of the Grand Prix for over two hours, until the rain eased at 15:50 local time. The race was restarted behind the safety car with the drivers in the positions held before the suspension. Vettel was first, followed by Kobayashi, Massa, Heidfeld, Petrov and di Resta. Webber was in seventh place with Alonso, de la Rosa and Button behind. The safety car remained out for seven laps, during which the circuit began drying enough to be suitable for intermediate tyres, and D'Ambrosio pitted on lap 33 to change from the full wets. Vettel began to extend the lead over Kobayashi once the safety car came in on lap 35, as Massa and Heidfeld fought for Kobayashi's second place. Schumacher led several cars into the pitlane to change to intermediate tyres, while Button, Heidfeld and di Resta were among those who pitted the next lap. Vettel and Karthikeyan were the only drivers not to change tyres by lap 37, when Button came upon tenth placed Alonso as he exited the pitlane. As Button attempted to pass at turn 3 the two cars touched, and Alonso's Ferrari spun and beached upon a curb, bringing out the safety car. When the race resumed three laps later, Vettel, Kobayashi and Massa retained their positions, as Heidfeld, di Resta, Webber and Schumacher fought for fourth place. Button had a punctured tyre after the collision and was in twenty-first and last place, but immediately began to make up positions and was 14th by lap 44. Di Resta damaged his front wing attempting to overtake Heidfeld; the subsequent pit-stop and drive-through penalty dropped him down to last. Schumacher, having overtaken Webber, passed Heidfeld in fourth place, and set the fastest lap of the race.

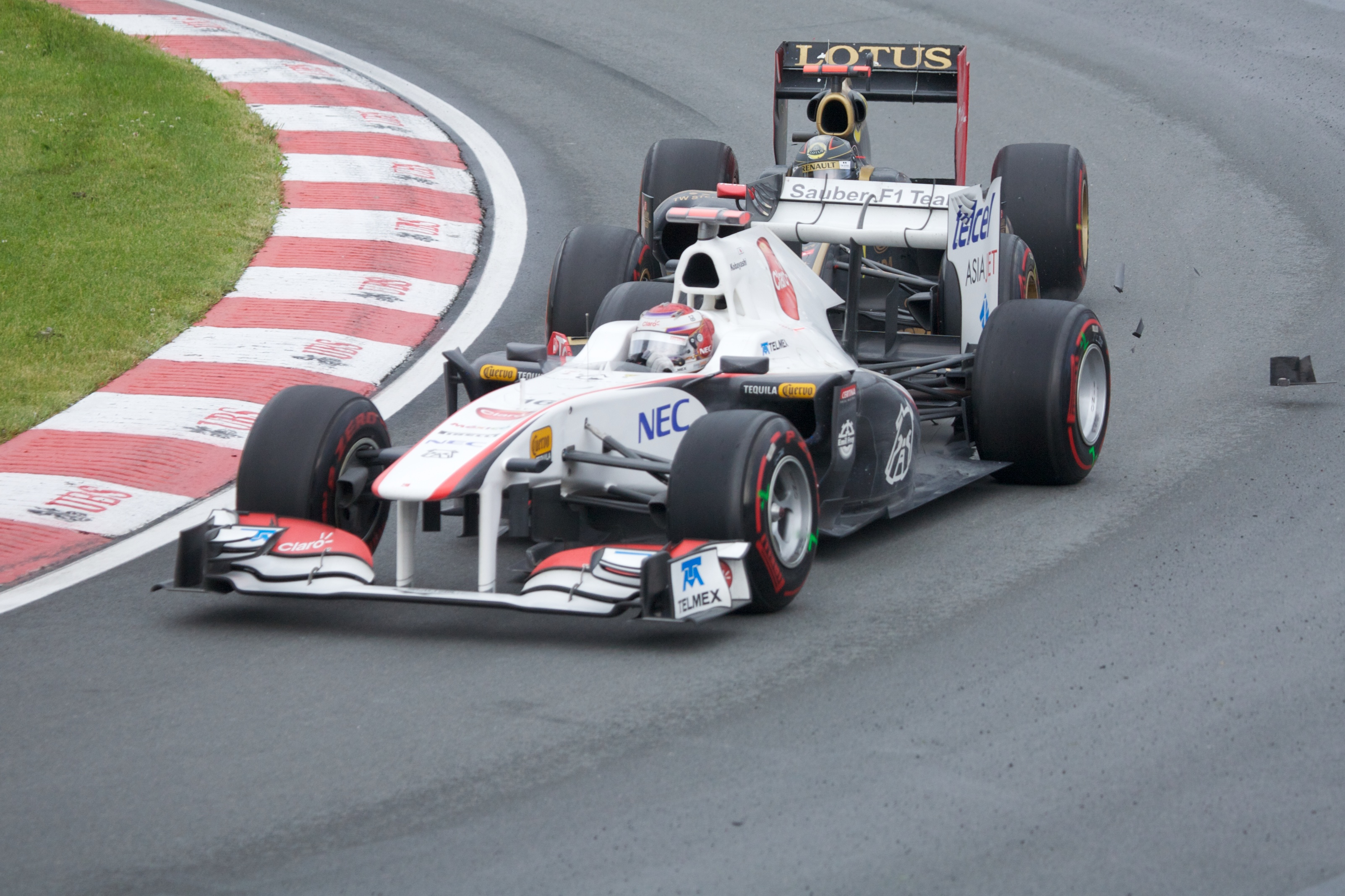
Heidfeld's retirement, after his wing became lodged beneath his car, led to the final safety car deployment of the race.

DRS was enabled on lap 46, as Barrichello and Rosberg were contesting eighth position. Button had caught Maldonado and Alguersuari, and passed both cars for tenth place. Mark Webber was the first driver to switch to slick tyres, and was followed by Barrichello and Buemi. Kobayashi and Massa, fighting for second place, were both passed by Schumacher on lap 51; Massa then passed Kobayashi for third place. As the drivers pitted for slick tyres over the next three laps, Massa damaged his wing forcing him into another pitstop, while damage to Adrian Sutil's car led to his retirement. Button had risen from ninth after his pit-stop to fourth, and was catching the leading trio of Vettel, Schumacher and Webber. On lap 56 Heidfeld, while battling Kobayashi for fifth place, collided with the rear of the Sauber which damaged his front wing. The wing then detached and folded under the car, and Heidfeld after losing control of his car ran down an escape road on turn 3. The debris on-track from the accident called the sixth safety car period of the race.

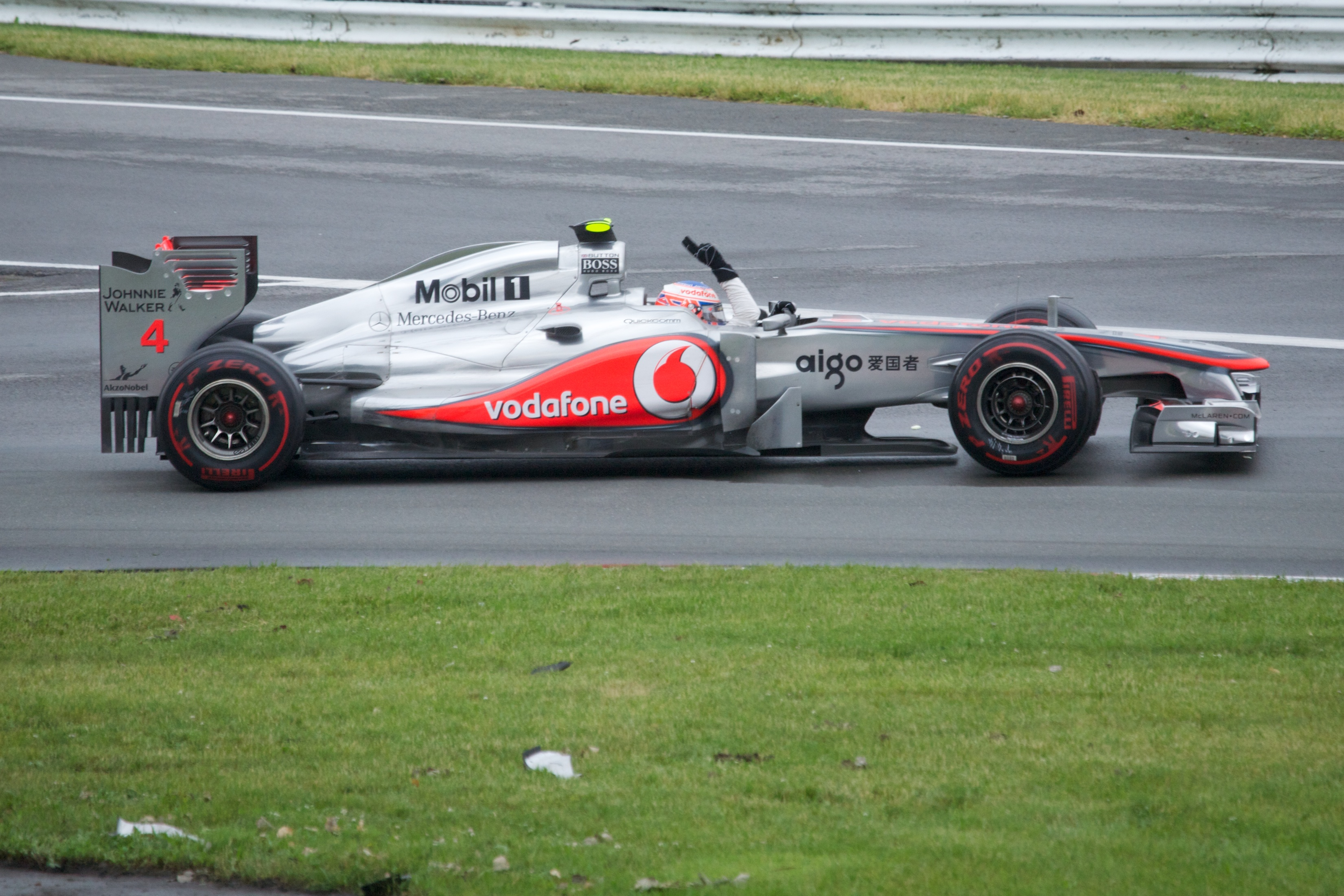
Button celebrating after winning his first race since the 2010 Chinese Grand Prix.

Following the pitstops and safety car deployment, Petrov had gained sixth place while Barrichello, Alguersuari, Rosberg and Maldonado were in the remaining point scoring positions. Schumacher and Webber, who had contested second place before the safety car, resumed their fight as the race resumed on lap 61. Barrichello was passed by Rosberg and Alguersuari before Massa, who had been in eleventh place, overtook both Williams cars for ninth. Kobayashi lost fifth place to Petrov, and Maldonado retired by spinning off on the wet track at turn two. Webber, passing Schumacher using DRS, cut the chicane on lap 64 and ceded the position back to avoid a penalty. Button passed Webber, after he again cut the chicane, and Schumacher on the same lap, and gained second place. As Button began catching race leader Vettel, Webber overtook Schumacher for third place on lap 67. On the same lap di Resta retired because of a puncture, and Massa gained eighth position from Alguersuari. The fastest lap of the race was set by Button on lap 69, setting a time of 1:16.956 as he was closing to Vettel for the race lead.

Vettel led by 0.9 seconds on the final lap, before he ran wide at turn six. Button passed him to take the lead, and held it to win the race. Vettel recovered from going off-track and finished second, ahead of Webber in third and Schumacher in fourth. Petrov took fifth place, while Massa passed Kobayashi on the finish line for sixth place. Alguersuari, Barrichello and Buemi filled the final point scoring positions, and Rosberg's car had lost the front wing, dropping him to eleventh. De la Rosa was twelfth, and Liuzzi, d'Ambrosio, Glock, Trulli and Karthikeyan were the final classified drivers.

=== Post-race ===
"I enjoyed it very much coming through the field, fighting your way through the field is almost as good as winning the race. That feeling of getting one up on someone. A great race for people who are sat here, to be on the podium is a pretty exceptional result and to fight my way through from last position... It is definitely my best race."

— Jenson Button, speaking during the post-race press conference.

The top three finishers appeared on the podium to collect their trophies, and in the subsequent press conference. Button felt the win was the best of his career so far, and stated that he had to fight hard to win the race: "It was really a fight. I got a drive-through for speeding behind the safety car and I had to fight my way through about three times. Eventually, on the last lap I was chasing down Seb. He ran a little bit wide onto the wet part of the circuit and I was able to take the opportunity and take the win." Button also praised his team and strategy for helping him take the victory, in particular the moves to intermediate tyres. Vettel expressed his disappointment of making a mistake on the final lap, after driving a faultless race up to that point. Nevertheless, he was happy with second place, as he had increased his championship lead. Webber said he was happy to finish third after his incident at the beginning of the race, putting his recovery from fourteenth place down to correct tyre choices.

Martin Whitmarsh, McLaren's team principal, praised Button's win, believing that it was one of the finest performances in Formula One:

I think it was one of the best wins in the history of F1, let alone his. There were punctures, he had to change the front wing, and from 21st I don't know how many times he had to overtake people. He just drove fantastically well. He kept focused. He applied as much pressure as he had to get past and really did a fantastic job. This was 90 per cent him and 10 per cent the car. He did a great, great, great job.

The stewards did not impose a penalty on Button for his collisions with Hamilton and Alonso, having judged that no driver was to blame in either incident. Hamilton agreed with the stewards that Button did not intentionally collide with him, and although he felt he was alongside Button at the time, later reflected that "he probably hadn't spotted me". He went on to praise his teammate's race as "an utterly fantastic performance, from a truly great driver." Alonso also did not place any blame on Button, saying that it was the final incident on a day that "everything went wrong".

Michael Schumacher admitted to having mixed feelings after the race, having been in second position until the race's last laps. The Mercedes driver stated: "I would obviously have loved to finish there [in second place] and be on the podium again. But even if it did not work out in the very end, we can be happy about the result and the big fight we put in." Kobayashi, placed second at the restart, shared similar feelings to Schumacher about finishing in a lower position: "Originally I qualified 13th so then it is not bad to finish seventh, but on the other hand I started second after the long red flag and looking from there the result is disappointing."

The usage of the safety car came under criticism from figures within the sport. Fernando Alonso disagreed with the decision to start under the safety car as he felt it prevented him from attacking Vettel, while Sauber technical director James Key thought his team was put at a disadvantage when Kobayashi could not defend against the quicker cars after the fifth safety car period. Martin Brundle, who competed in Formula One for twelve years, stated "the fact that the drivers came in almost immediately for intermediate tyres tells me that, on the face of it, the safety car was out too long", and felt that the safety car "should be a last resort, not a default option." However, he recognised that FIA race director Charlie Whiting had to consider the driver's visibility, and inexperience using the Pirelli wet-weather tyres led to caution. Jarno Trulli however agreed with the FIA's decisions, in particular the length of the red flag delay: "It was right to wait that long; track conditions had to improve in order to make the cars drivable again. They did everything right." De la Rosa and di Resta also agreed with the decision to halt the race, and Whiting stating that "when it rained it was quite clear we needed to stop the race." Whiting went on to say that the opinions of the drivers were taken into account on the decision to halt the race, although he also considered the possibility of a suspension benefiting those drivers.

With a total time of four hours, four minutes and 39 seconds (including the two-hour suspension), the race was the longest in Formula One history. Button set records for the lowest average race winning speed, at 74.864 km/h (46.518 mph) and with five stops (plus one drive-through penalty) the most pit stops by the winner of a world championship race. The race also had the highest number of safety car deployments, with six appearances.

=== Race classification ===
Drivers who scored championship points are denoted in bold.

Pos.	No.	Driver	Constructor	Laps	Time/Retired	Grid	Points
1	4	(United Kingdom) **Jenson Button**	**McLaren-Mercedes**	70	4:04:39.537	7	25
2	1	(Germany) **Sebastian Vettel**	**Red Bull Racing-Renault**	70	+2.709	1	18
3	2	(Australia) **Mark Webber**	**Red Bull Racing-Renault**	70	+13.828	4	15
4	7	(Germany) **Michael Schumacher**	**Mercedes**	70	+14.219	8	12
5	10	(Russia) **Vitaly Petrov**	**Renault**	70	+20.395	10	10
6	6	(Brazil) **Felipe Massa**	**Ferrari**	70	+33.225	3	8
7	16	(Japan) **Kamui Kobayashi**	**Sauber-Ferrari**	70	+33.270	13	6
8	19	(Spain) **Jaime Alguersuari**	**Toro Rosso-Ferrari**	70	+35.964	PL	4
9	11	(Brazil) **Rubens Barrichello**	**Williams-Cosworth**	70	+45.117	16	2
10	18	(Switzerland) **Sébastien Buemi**	**Toro Rosso-Ferrari**	70	+47.056	15	1
11	8	(Germany) Nico Rosberg	Mercedes	70	+50.454	6	
12	17	(Spain) Pedro de la Rosa	Sauber-Ferrari	70	+1:03.607	17	
13	23	(Italy) Vitantonio Liuzzi	HRT-Cosworth	69	+1 lap	20	
14	25	(Belgium) Jérôme d'Ambrosio	Virgin-Cosworth	69	+1 lap	23	
15	24	(Germany) Timo Glock	Virgin-Cosworth	69	+1 lap	21	
16	21	(Italy) Jarno Trulli	Lotus-Renault	69	+1 lap	18	
17	22	(India) Narain Karthikeyan	HRT-Cosworth	69	+1 lap^{3}	22	
18	15	(United Kingdom) Paul di Resta	Force India-Mercedes	67	Accident	11	
Ret	12	(Venezuela) Pastor Maldonado	Williams-Cosworth	61	Spun off	12	
Ret	9	(Germany) Nick Heidfeld	Renault	55	Accident	9	
Ret	14	(Germany) Adrian Sutil	Force India-Mercedes	49	Accident damage	14	
Ret	5	(Spain) Fernando Alonso	Ferrari	36	Collision	2	
Ret	20	(Finland) Heikki Kovalainen	Lotus-Renault	28	Driveshaft	19	
Ret	3	(United Kingdom) Lewis Hamilton	McLaren-Mercedes	7	Collision	5	

Note

1. – Narain Karthikeyan originally finished 14th, but received a post-race 20 second penalty for cutting the chicane and gaining an advantage.

== Championship standings after the race ==
Drivers' Championship standings

+/–	Pos.	Driver	Points
	1	(Germany) Sebastian Vettel	161
2	2	(United Kingdom) Jenson Button	101
	3	(Australia) Mark Webber	94
2	4	(United Kingdom) Lewis Hamilton	85
	5	(Spain) Fernando Alonso	69

Constructors' Championship standings

+/–	Pos.	Constructor	Points
	1	(Austria) Red Bull Racing-Renault	255
	2	(United Kingdom) McLaren-Mercedes	186
	3	(Italy) Ferrari	101
	4	(United Kingdom) Renault	60
	5	(Germany) Mercedes	52

- Note: Only the top five positions are included for both sets of standings.

Previous race: 2011 Monaco Grand Prix	FIA Formula One World Championship; 2011 season	Next race: 2011 European Grand Prix
Previous race: 2010 Canadian Grand Prix	Canadian Grand Prix	Next race: 2012 Canadian Grand Prix
