= 2011 European Grand Prix =

Race 8 of 19 in the 2011 Formula One World Championship
← Previous race	Next race →
- The Valencia Street Circuit

Race details
- Date: 26 June 2011
- Official name: 2011 Formula 1 Grand Prix of Europe
- Location: Valencia Street Circuit, Valencia, Spain
- Course: Temporary street circuit
- Course length: 5.419 km (3.367 miles)
- Distance: 57 laps, 308.883 km (191.931 miles)
- Weather: Clear, Fine and Dry; Air Temp 27 °C (81 °F); Track Temp 47 °C (117 °F)

Pole position
Driver	(Germany) Sebastian Vettel	Red Bull Racing-Renault
- Time: 1:36.975

Fastest lap
Driver	(Germany) Sebastian Vettel	Red Bull Racing-Renault
- Time: 1:41.852 on lap 53

Podium
First	(Germany) Sebastian Vettel	Red Bull Racing-Renault
Second	(Spain) Fernando Alonso	Ferrari
Third	(Australia) Mark Webber	Red Bull Racing-Renault

The 2011 European Grand Prix (officially the 2011 Formula 1 Grand Prix of Europe) was a Formula One motor race held on 26 June 2011 at the Valencia Street Circuit in Valencia, Spain. It was the eighth round of the 2011 Formula One season.

The race was won by defending world drivers' champion and championship leader Sebastian Vettel, who was driving a Red Bull Racing car. Vettel, who started from pole position, also recorded the fastest lap of the race on lap 53, giving him a hat-trick. After a race-long battle, Ferrari driver Fernando Alonso and Vettel's teammate Mark Webber finished the race in second and third respectively. The race was notable for having the fewest retirements and the most finishers ever in a Formula One Grand Prix with all 24 cars starting the race also finishing the race with no retirements.

As a consequence of the race, Vettel extended his lead in the Drivers' Championship standings to 77 points over Jenson Button and Webber. By finishing first and third, Red Bull extended their Constructors' Championship standings lead to 89 points over nearest rivals McLaren.

== Report ==
=== Background ===
In the week leading up to the Spanish Grand Prix, FIA race director Charlie Whiting announced that the Canadian Grand Prix would see the introduction of a secondary drag reduction system (DRS) activation zone. The plan for a secondary DRS zone would be continued at the European Grand Prix, with the first zone incorporating the long back straight on the approach to Turn 12, and the second zone using the stretch from Turns 14 to 17. Future use of a second DRS zone would depend on its success in Montreal and Valencia.

The FIA originally announced a ban on the off-throttle blown diffuser concept to be introduced at the British Grand Prix. While the planned date for the ban was kept in effect, extra limitations were introduced for the race in Valencia. This ban prohibits teams from running "extreme" engine maps in qualifying before reverting to a "safer" map for the race. The ban effectively means that teams are forced to run the same engine maps in both qualifying and the race.

The European Grand Prix also marked the race debut of Formula One tyre supplier Pirelli's medium-specification tyre compound. The medium compound tyre was selected as the white-banded harder "prime" tyre and the yellow-banded soft compound as the softer "option" compound.

This race was scheduled to be the last where off-throttle blown-diffusers were used; however the ban did not continue after the British Grand Prix and proved to be temporary. In Germany all the teams returned to use what was commonly referred to as Valencia specification, or Valencia-spec diffusers. The concept was eventually banned for 2012.

In Canada, Sebastian Vettel had lengthened his Drivers' Championship lead to 60 points. He had 161 points, and nearest title contenders Jenson Button, winner of the last Grand Prix, Red Bull Racing teammate Mark Webber and the second McLaren of Lewis Hamilton had 101, 94 and 85 respectively in second, third and fourth positions. Fernando Alonso's Ferrari had crashed out in Montreal, likewise Hamilton, and stayed on 69 points in fifth. Red Bull led the Constructors' table with 255 points, McLaren were in second with 186 and Ferrari were in third with 101. Renault were fourth with 60 and Mercedes were fifth with 52.

=== Practice ===
In the first free practice session, Mark Webber was the fastest car on track by eight-tenths of a second ahead of Renault's Vitaly Petrov, Fernando Alonso, and Lewis Hamilton for McLaren made it four different cars in the top four. Nick Heidfeld, in the second Renault, completed the top five, ahead of Felipe Massa and Jenson Button. Championship leader Sebastian Vettel was down in sixteenth place, two and half seconds off the pace of Webber. Karun Chandhok, who filled in for Jarno Trulli at Lotus was the only of the 24 drivers not to set a time. Nico Hülkenberg filled in for Paul di Resta at Force India and Daniel Ricciardo took Narain Karthikeyan's seat at HRT.

Alonso was the fastest man in the second session, once again narrowly followed by Hamilton. Vettel had moved himself up into third for this session, and fellow German, Michael Schumacher, was fourth. The remaining Red Bull Racing, McLaren, Ferrari, Mercedes and the two Renaults completed the top ten places. Jaime Alguersuari was the only driver not to set a time in the session. Trulli, di Resta and Karthikeyan all returned to their seats for the session. In the sole Saturday session, Vettel set the quickest time ahead of Alonso, Massa, Webber, Button, Nico Rosberg, Hamilton, Schumacher, Petrov and then Heidfeld.

=== Qualifying ===
Sebastian Vettel took his seventh pole position from eight races in 2011, closely followed by Red Bull teammate, Mark Webber, who completed the front row. The second and third fastest qualifying teams followed – the McLarens of Lewis Hamilton (third) and Jenson Button (sixth) split by the two Ferraris of Fernando Alonso ahead of teammate Felipe Massa. The Mercedes cars were seventh and eighth with Nico Rosberg in front of Michael Schumacher. After that, the Renaults and Force Indias fought to make the top 10 – one of each going through – they were followed by a similar battle between the Saubers and Williams cars. Sébastien Buemi was the one Toro Rosso in Q2, ending up seventeenth, with teammate Jaime Alguersuari eighteenth. The back three rows on the grid were filled up by the new teams – Narain Karthikeyan qualifying last and almost a second behind Vitantonio Liuzzi.

=== Race ===
The race was very hot, the average temperature around 47 °C (117 °F).

At the start Sebastian Vettel led from pole, with teammate Mark Webber behind. Felipe Massa had a good start from fifth, driving straight between and past Lewis Hamilton and Fernando Alonso at Turn 1; but because Massa looked down the outside of Webber at Turn 2, Alonso could get back in front of Massa on the inside of Turn 3. Bad starts from the McLarens meant Hamilton dropped from third to fifth, and Jenson Button dropped from sixth to seventh – behind Nico Rosberg. Button later retook sixth place from Rosberg a few laps later into Turn 2. Before the pit stops the order was now Vettel, Webber, Alonso, Massa, Hamilton, Button, Rosberg, Schumacher (the four fastest cars in the top eight spots).

It seemed like the Ferraris had made great improvements since Canada because their pace was at least equal to the McLarens, and significantly faster at some stages of the race. The McLarens had quiet races, Button stuck in sixth, while Hamilton used the undercut to get past Massa in the pit stops for fourth, where he would finish the race.

Fernando Alonso engaged in a race long battle with Mark Webber for second while Vettel stormed away into the distance. Early on in the race Alonso overtook Webber in the first DRS zone, on the inside of Turn 12. However, in the pit stops, Red Bull Racing strategy got Webber back in front. Ferrari later used the pit stops to get Alonso back in front of Webber. A radio message to Webber, telling him to go slower due to gearbox troubles ensured Alonso's second place.

Michael Schumacher finished a disappointing 17th after a misjudgement from him, when he exited the pits, where he ploughed his front wing into the side of Vitaly Petrov's Renault. This meant he had to pit again the following lap demoting him to 17th, where he stayed on a circuit notoriously difficult to overtake on. Although, Schumacher admitted after the race that seventh and eighth was the maximum for the two Mercedes cars. Sergio Pérez preserved his tyres so he only had to pit once, he finished eleventh after starting in sixteenth. His Sauber teammate, Kamui Kobayashi, finished in sixteenth place, the first time in 2011 he did not finish in the top ten. For the second race in a row Jaime Alguersuari justified his position in Toro Rosso by finishing eighth from eighteenth on the grid. Another driver on a good race was Mark Webber, calling it his "best race this year", although he was still beaten by teammate Vettel, who took his sixth victory from eight races.

=== Post-race ===
After the race both McLaren drivers told the media that there was work to be done, particularly improvements in the aerodynamics of their car.

The European Grand Prix had the most classified finishers (24) beating the record set in the 2011 Chinese Grand Prix, which ended with only one retirement. The Grand Prix is notable as it was only the fourth World Championship Grand Prix where there were no retirements, the others being the 1961 Dutch Grand Prix (fifteen starters), the 2005 United States Grand Prix (six starters) and the 2005 Italian Grand Prix (twenty starters). HRT driver Narain Karthikeyan finished the race in last place and recorded the lowest finishing position in Formula One history, having already earned the distinction previously in the season with his 23rd position finish in the aforementioned Chinese Grand Prix.

The track was criticised by former Formula One driver Martin Brundle after the race, claiming its nature makes it difficult for drivers to overtake making the race boring. Former Formula One commentator Murray Walker claimed "the race was the least eventful race of an action packed season".

== Classification ==
=== Qualifying ===
Pos	No	Driver	Constructor	Part 1	Part 2	Part 3	Grid
1	1	(Germany) Sebastian Vettel	Red Bull Racing-Renault	1:39.116	1:37.305	1:36.975	1
2	2	(Australia) Mark Webber	Red Bull Racing-Renault	1:39.956	1:38.058	1:37.163	2
3	3	(United Kingdom) Lewis Hamilton	McLaren-Mercedes	1:39.244	1:37.727	1:37.380	3
4	5	(Spain) Fernando Alonso	Ferrari	1:39.725	1:37.930	1:37.454	4
5	6	(Brazil) Felipe Massa	Ferrari	1:38.413	1:38.566	1:37.535	5
6	4	(United Kingdom) Jenson Button	McLaren-Mercedes	1:39.453	1:37.749	1:37.645	6
7	8	(Germany) Nico Rosberg	Mercedes	1:39.266	1:38.373	1:38.231	7
8	7	(Germany) Michael Schumacher	Mercedes	1:39.198	1:38.365	1:38.240	8
9	9	(Germany) Nick Heidfeld	Renault	1:39.877	1:38.781	No time^{1}	9
10	14	(Germany) Adrian Sutil	Force India-Mercedes	1:39.329	1:39.034	No time^{1}	10
11	10	(Russia) Vitaly Petrov	Renault	1:39.690	1:39.068		11
12	15	(United Kingdom) Paul di Resta	Force India-Mercedes	1:39.852	1:39.422		12
13	11	(Brazil) Rubens Barrichello	Williams-Cosworth	1:39.602	1:39.489		13
14	16	(Japan) Kamui Kobayashi	Sauber-Ferrari	1:40.131	1:39.525		14
15	12	(Venezuela) Pastor Maldonado	Williams-Cosworth	1:39.690	1:39.645		15
16	17	(Mexico) Sergio Pérez	Sauber-Ferrari	1:39.494	1:39.657		16
17	18	(Switzerland) Sébastien Buemi	Toro Rosso-Ferrari	1:39.679	1:39.711		17
18	19	(Spain) Jaime Alguersuari	Toro Rosso-Ferrari	1:40.232			18
19	20	(Finland) Heikki Kovalainen	Lotus-Renault	1:41.664			19
20	21	(Italy) Jarno Trulli	Lotus-Renault	1:42.234			20
21	24	(Germany) Timo Glock	Virgin-Cosworth	1:42.553			21
22	23	(Italy) Vitantonio Liuzzi	HRT-Cosworth	1:43.584			22
23	25	(Belgium) Jérôme d'Ambrosio	Virgin-Cosworth	1:43.735			23
24	22	(India) Narain Karthikeyan	HRT-Cosworth	1:44.363			24
107% time: 1:45.301

Notes

- ^1 – Nick Heidfeld and Adrian Sutil did not set a lap time in Q3, as they were saving their tires for the race.

=== Race ===
Pos	No	Driver	Constructor	Laps	Time/Retired	Grid	Points
1	1	(Germany) Sebastian Vettel	Red Bull Racing-Renault	57	1:39:36.169	1	25
2	5	(Spain) Fernando Alonso	Ferrari	57	+10.891	4	18
3	2	(Australia) Mark Webber	Red Bull Racing-Renault	57	+27.255	2	15
4	3	(United Kingdom) Lewis Hamilton	McLaren-Mercedes	57	+46.190	3	12
5	6	(Brazil) Felipe Massa	Ferrari	57	+51.705	5	10
6	4	(United Kingdom) Jenson Button	McLaren-Mercedes	57	+1:00.065	6	8
7	8	(Germany) Nico Rosberg	Mercedes	57	+1:38.090	7	6
8	19	(Spain) Jaime Alguersuari	Toro Rosso-Ferrari	56	+1 Lap	18	4
9	14	(Germany) Adrian Sutil	Force India-Mercedes	56	+1 Lap	10	2
10	9	(Germany) Nick Heidfeld	Renault	56	+1 Lap	9	1
11	17	(Mexico) Sergio Pérez	Sauber-Ferrari	56	+1 Lap	16	
12	11	(Brazil) Rubens Barrichello	Williams-Cosworth	56	+1 Lap	13	
13	18	(Switzerland) Sébastien Buemi	Toro Rosso-Ferrari	56	+1 Lap	17	
14	15	(United Kingdom) Paul di Resta	Force India-Mercedes	56	+1 Lap	12	
15	10	(Russia) Vitaly Petrov	Renault	56	+1 Lap	11	
16	16	(Japan) Kamui Kobayashi	Sauber-Ferrari	56	+1 Lap	14	
17	7	(Germany) Michael Schumacher	Mercedes	56	+1 Lap	8	
18	12	(Venezuela) Pastor Maldonado	Williams-Cosworth	56	+1 Lap	15	
19	20	(Finland) Heikki Kovalainen	Lotus-Renault	55	+2 Laps	19	
20	21	(Italy) Jarno Trulli	Lotus-Renault	55	+2 Laps	20	
21	24	(Germany) Timo Glock	Virgin-Cosworth	55	+2 Laps	21	
22	25	(Belgium) Jérôme d'Ambrosio	Virgin-Cosworth	55	+2 Laps	23	
23	23	(Italy) Vitantonio Liuzzi	HRT-Cosworth	54	+3 Laps	22	
24	22	(India) Narain Karthikeyan	HRT-Cosworth	54	+3 Laps	24	

== Championship standings after the race ==
Drivers' Championship standings

Pos.	Driver	Points
1	(Germany) Sebastian Vettel	186
2	(United Kingdom) Jenson Button	109
3	(Australia) Mark Webber	109
4	(United Kingdom) Lewis Hamilton	97
5	(Spain) Fernando Alonso	87

Constructors' Championship standings

Pos.	Constructor	Points
1	(Austria) Red Bull Racing-Renault	295
2	(United Kingdom) McLaren-Mercedes	206
3	(Italy) Ferrari	129
4	(United Kingdom) Renault	61
5	(Germany) Mercedes	58

- Note: Only the top five positions are included for both sets of standings.

== See also ==
- 2011 Valencia GP2 Series round
- 2011 Valencia GP3 Series round

Previous race: 2011 Canadian Grand Prix	FIA Formula One World Championship; 2011 season	Next race: 2011 British Grand Prix
Previous race: 2010 European Grand Prix	European Grand Prix	Next race: 2012 European Grand Prix
