= 2012 Abu Dhabi Grand Prix =

Race 18 of 20 in the 2012 Formula One World Championship
← Previous race	Next race →

Race details
- Date: 4 November 2012
- Official name: 2012 Formula 1 Etihad Airways Abu Dhabi Grand Prix
- Location: Yas Marina Circuit; Yas Island, Abu Dhabi, United Arab Emirates
- Course: Permanent racing facility
- Course length: 5.554 km (3.451 miles)
- Distance: 55 laps, 305.355 km (189.739 miles)
- Weather: Dry Air Temp 29 °C (84 °F) Track Temp 34 °C (93 °F) dropping to 29 °C (84 °F)

Pole position
Driver	(United Kingdom) Lewis Hamilton	McLaren-Mercedes
- Time: 1:40.630

Fastest lap
Driver	(Germany) Sebastian Vettel	Red Bull-Renault
- Time: 1:43.964 on lap 54

Podium
First	(Finland) Kimi Räikkönen	Lotus-Renault
Second	(Spain) Fernando Alonso	Ferrari
Third	(Germany) Sebastian Vettel	Red Bull-Renault

The 2012 Abu Dhabi Grand Prix (formally the 2012 Formula 1 Etihad Airways Abu Dhabi Grand Prix) was a Formula One motor race held on 4 November 2012 at the Yas Marina Circuit, Yas Island, Abu Dhabi, United Arab Emirates. It was the eighteenth round of the 2012 Formula One season and the fourth Abu Dhabi Grand Prix. The 55-lap race was won by Lotus driver Kimi Räikkönen after starting from fourth position. Fernando Alonso finished second in a Ferrari with his championship rival Sebastian Vettel third for Red Bull, having started from the pit lane.

The victory was Räikkönen's first of the season, his first since he returned to Formula One at the start of the year, and his first since the 2009 Belgian Grand Prix. It was the first time a Lotus had won a race since Ayrton Senna's victory in Detroit in 1987. Räikkönen's radio communications during the race were widely reported, particularly his comment to his engineer on lap 23: "Just leave me alone, I know what to do."

Despite winning the race, Räikkönen was mathematically eliminated from championship contention alongside both Webber and pole-sitter Hamilton. Räikkönen amassed a total of 198 points, but his deficit towards championship leader Vettel of 57 points was too large to catch up, considering that a maximum of only 50 points could have been awarded for the final two races of the season. Meanwhile, Alonso's second place allowed him to reduce Vettel's lead in the World Drivers' Championship to ten points. In the Constructors' Championship, the result also saw third-placed McLaren let their title hopes slip away, meaning that Red Bull and Ferrari were left as remaining contenders for the Constructors' title. The result allowed Ferrari to narrow the gap to the leaders to 82 points, but Red Bull had the opportunity to clinch the title at the next round in Austin, needing just four more for their third title (overall and consecutively).

== Background ==
Heading into the eighteenth race of the season, Red Bull driver Sebastian Vettel led the Drivers' Championship with 240 points, ahead of championship rival Fernando Alonso on 227 points and Kimi Räikkönen with 173. Vettel's teammate Mark Webber was in fourth place on 167 points and Lewis Hamilton was a close fifth on 165 points. Red Bull were leading the Constructors' Championship with 407 points; Ferrari (316 points) and McLaren (306) were vying for second place. Lotus were fourth on 288 points and Mercedes were a further one-hundred and fifty two points adrift in fifth. The championship had so far been tumultuous, with seven different drivers winning the first seven races of the season. Räikkonen, his Lotus teammate Romain Grosjean, along with Sergio Pérez and Felipe Massa had finished in second and both Michael Schumacher and Kamui Kobayashi had finished in third.

After finishing in second place behind Vettel in the Indian Grand Prix Alonso stated it was crucial that he stayed within reach of the Red Bull team and hoped his Ferrari team would finish strongly and not become inflicted with mechanical failures. Despite winning the last four Grands Prix Vettel felt that his lead in the Drivers' Championship remained "vulnerable" and did not believe his Red Bull team had proven themselves as the fastest in the field.

Some teams made modifications to their cars in preparation for the event. Williams drivers Bruno Senna and Pastor Maldonado tested a new front wing during the Friday practice sessions which had three small flaps on its upper section but opted to run an older specification for qualifying and the race. Ferrari introduced upgrades for the F2012 as part of a strategy to remain in contention for the championship. The upgrades included a new front wing with updated main planes, flaps, and endplates, along with a revised front wing design. Additionally, the car's forward bargeboards were modified. Ferrari were allowed to break one of their four allocated curfews on the Thursday night before the race to allow mechanics to fit the updates onto the team's car. The team broke their second curfew one day later when a team member walked into the Ferrari garage early by mistake and did not work on both cars. Mercedes continued to evaluate a new "double DRS" system. Force India introduced a new chassis for Paul di Resta who had struggled with handling issues with his previous monocoque. Caterham revised their chassis which had modified exhausts, bodywork, new front brake ducts, revisions to their floor, diffuser and front wing to stay with Marussia in their battle for tenth place in the Constructors' Championship.

== Practice and qualifying ==
Conditions were hot and dry for the Friday practice sessions with air and track temperatures falling as sunset emerged meaning lap times were faster in the evening. Drivers had to cope with a tailwind between turns eight and nine. Hamilton set the pace in the first practice session with a lap of one minute and 43.285 seconds on medium compound tyres, three-tenths of a second quicker than teammate Jenson Button in second. Vettel was third fastest with his Red Bull teammate Webber in fifth; they were sandwiched by Alonso. Michael Schumacher, Maldonado, Nico Rosberg, Valtteri Bottas and Räikkönen rounded out the top ten fastest drivers of the session. Pérez ran wide at the pit lane entry onto the run-off area whilst turning right and attempting a full-speed race entry but avoided contact with the barriers with twelve minutes of the session remaining. In the second practice session, Vettel set the fastest lap of the day with a time of one minute and 41.751 seconds which was recorded late in the session; Hamilton finished with the second-fastest time and traded the fastest lap with Vettel. His teammate Button was third quickest, with Webber fourth despite losing time towards the end of the ninety-minute period with a kinetic energy recovery system (KERS) cooling leak. Grosjean was fifth and his Lotus teammate Räikkönen took sixth. The two Ferrari drivers were seventh and eighth (with Alonso ahead of Massa). Maldonado and Pérez followed in the top ten.

Conditions remained hot and dry for the Saturday afternoon practice session. Hamilton set the fastest lap of the third session at one minute and 42.130 seconds on soft compound tyres, nearly three-tenths of a second faster than teammate Button. Vettel was in his garage for fifty-five minutes because his mechanics rectified a problem with his brake callipers; he managed to do one flying lap with the fastest time in the track's second sector to secure the third quickest-time overall. Vettel's time meant his teammate Webber was fourth and Nico Hülkenberg fifth. Grosjean was sixth in the faster of the two Lotus cars despite losing track time as his brakes were bled in the pit lane. Maldonado took seventh having led the timesheets early in the session. Alonso, Räikkönen and di Resta completed the top ten ahead of qualifying. At the end of the session, Webber was driving slowly into the pit lane when Räikkönen closed towards the Red Bull driver who took evasive action to avoid a collision.

“Those extra three-tenths came from my family! Our car works incredibly well around here. Our aero package really suits this track; the set-up was perfect, and everything came together perfectly for qualifying. My lap felt really great - I enjoyed it so much. I love this track! Still, I'm realistic: the race tomorrow is going to be tough. At the start, it's down to the team to make sure the clutch performs perfectly because the getaway will be incredibly important. Our race pace is very strong, but so is Red Bull's - and staying ahead will be tough, particularly with the double DRS zones. I really want to finish on a high for Vodafone McLaren Mercedes. I’ll give it everything I’ve got tomorrow.”

— Lewis Hamilton, commenting on taking pole position.

The qualifying session was held on Saturday evening. The conditions were hot; the air temperature was between 29–30 °C (84–86 °F) and the track temperature was 31 °C (88 °F). Hamilton set the fastest time in all three sessions and clinched his sixth pole position of the season with a lap of one minute and 40.630 seconds. He was joined on the front row of the grid by Webber who recorded a time three-tenths of a second off Hamilton's pace. Vettel secured third position but was ordered by Red Bull via radio to stop on his in-lap because his car was running low on fuel. Officials from Formula One's governing body the Fédération Internationale de l'Automobile were unable to extract a one-litre fuel sample required for analysis and Vettel was moved to the back of the grid. As a result, every driver who qualified behind Vettel was promoted one position. Maldonado inherited third and avoided elimination in the second part of qualifying and adjusted his balance for the final part of the session. Räikkönen started fourth and said his qualifying session was "good".

=== Qualifying classification ===
Pos.	No.	Driver	Constructor	Part 1	Part 2	Part 3	Grid
1	4	(United Kingdom) Lewis Hamilton	McLaren-Mercedes	1:41.497	1:40.901	1:40.630	1
2	2	(Australia) Mark Webber	Red Bull-Renault	1:41.933	1:41.277	1:40.978	2
3	18	(Venezuela) Pastor Maldonado	Williams-Renault	1:41.981	1:41.907	1:41.226	3
4	9	(Finland) Kimi Räikkönen	Lotus-Renault	1:42.222	1:41.532	1:41.260	4
5	3	(United Kingdom) Jenson Button	McLaren-Mercedes	1:42.342	1:41.873	1:41.290	5
6	5	(Spain) Fernando Alonso	Ferrari	1:41.939	1:41.514	1:41.582	6
7	8	(Germany) Nico Rosberg	Mercedes	1:41.926	1:41.698	1:41.603	7
8	6	(Brazil) Felipe Massa	Ferrari	1:41.974	1:41.846	1:41.723	8
9	10	(France) Romain Grosjean	Lotus-Renault	1:42.046	1:41.620	1:41.778	9
10	12	(Germany) Nico Hülkenberg	Force India-Mercedes	1:42.579	1:42.019		10
11	15	(Mexico) Sergio Pérez	Sauber-Ferrari	1:42.624	1:42.084		11
12	11	(United Kingdom) Paul di Resta	Force India-Mercedes	1:42.572	1:42.218		12
13	7	(Germany) Michael Schumacher	Mercedes	1:42.735	1:42.289		13
14	19	(Brazil) Bruno Senna	Williams-Renault	1:43.298	1:42.330		14
15	14	(Japan) Kamui Kobayashi	Sauber-Ferrari	1:43.582	1:42.606		15
16	16	(Australia) Daniel Ricciardo	Toro Rosso-Ferrari	1:43.280	1:42.765		16
17	17	(France) Jean-Éric Vergne	Toro Rosso-Ferrari	1:44.058			17
18	20	(Finland) Heikki Kovalainen	Caterham-Renault	1:44.956			18
19	25	(France) Charles Pic	Marussia-Cosworth	1:45.089			19
20	21	(Russia) Vitaly Petrov	Caterham-Renault	1:45.151			20
21	24	(Germany) Timo Glock	Marussia-Cosworth	1:45.426			21
22	22	(Spain) Pedro de la Rosa	HRT-Cosworth	1:45.766			22
23	23	(India) Narain Karthikeyan	HRT-Cosworth	1:46.382			23
EX	1	(Germany) Sebastian Vettel	Red Bull-Renault	1:42.160	1:41.511	1:41.073	PL^{1}
107% time: 1:48.601

Notes
^1 – Sebastian Vettel, who set a 1:41.073 qualifying time in Q3 and subsequently would have started from third position, was excluded from the qualifying results for violating the rules by not having enough fuel to return to the pits. However, the stewards allowed him to start the race from the last grid position. Red Bull opted to make set-up changes before the race, violating parc fermé regulations, which meant that Sebastian Vettel had to start from the pit lane.

== Race ==
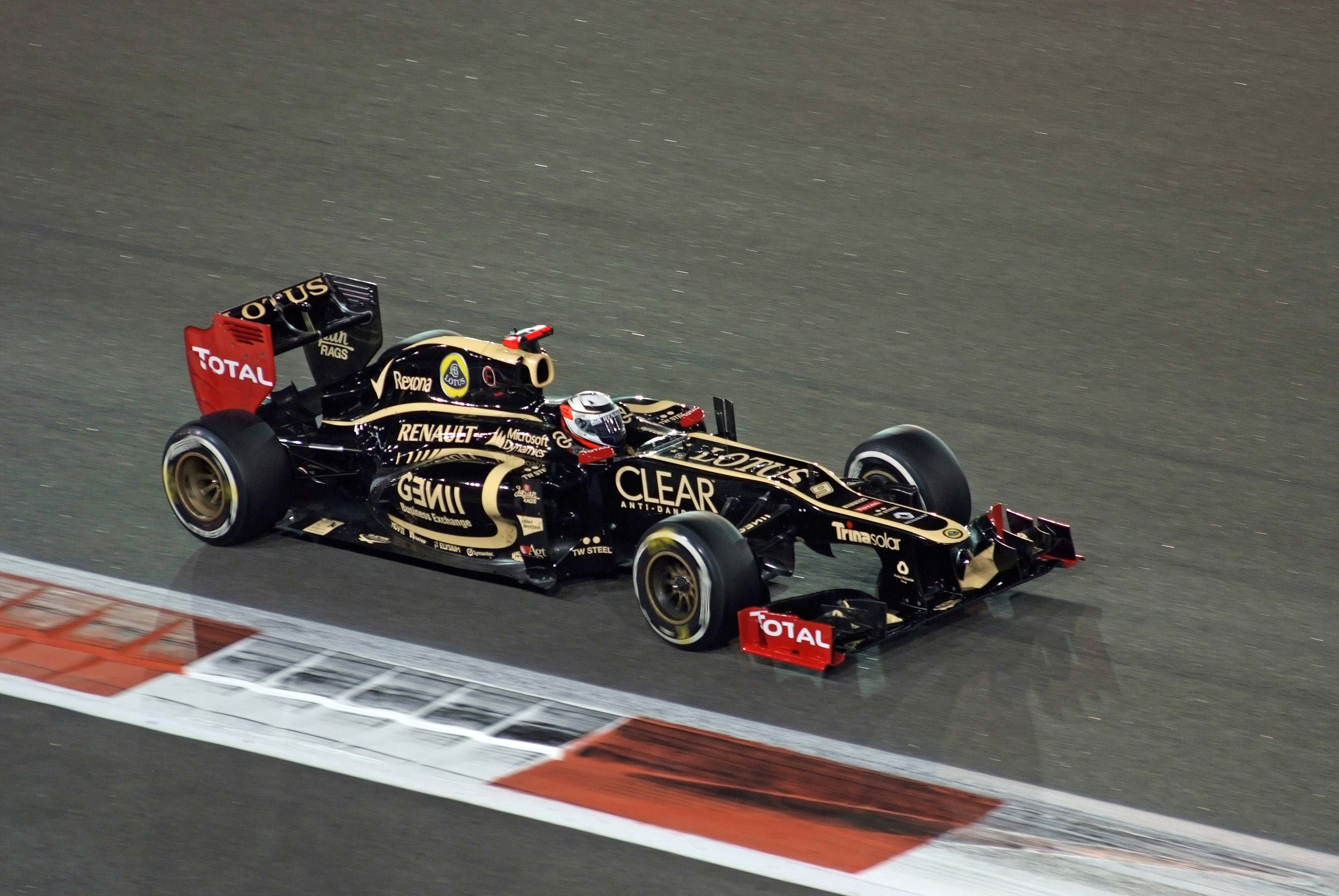
Kimi Räikkönen won his (and Lotus') only victory of the season.

The race started at 17:00 GST (UTC+4). The conditions on the grid were dry before the race; the air temperature ranged between 29–30 °C (84–86 °F) and the track temperature was between 29–34 °C (84–93 °F). Most of the drivers started on the soft compound tyres with Vettel, Schumacher and Senna starting on medium compound tyres. Red Bull elected to start Vettel in the pit lane after taking his car out of parc fermé and changed his gear ratios along with his suspension as well as the creation of a low-drag aerodynamic setup to allow overtaking easier for the driver. de la Rosa did the same when a thread on a rear tyre blanket got tangled on his car at the start of the formation lap. As the five red lights went out to signal the start of the race, Hamilton maintained his pole position advantage heading into the first corner. Räikkönen made a quick start and passed Webber and Maldonado to run in second. Force India teammates Hülkenberg and di Resta, along with Grosjean and Senna tangled heading into the first corner. Hülkenberg was forced to retire, while di Resta and Grosjean pitted at the end of the first lap for repairs; Grosjean for a replacement for a right-front punctured tyre. Alonso made a good start when he passed Button and overtook Webber after he got a run on the Red Bull after leaving turn nine. At the completion of the first lap, Hamilton led from Räikkönen, Maldonado, Alonso, Webber, Button, Massa, Kobayashi, Pérez, Schumacher, Ricciardo, Rosberg, Vergne, Glock, Kovalainen, Petrov, Pic, Karthikeyan, Senna, Vettel, de la Rosa, Grosjean and di Resta.

Hamilton complained of cold tyres and locked up heading into turn eight on lap two allowing Räikkönen to gain advantage but Hamilton withstood pressure from the Lotus driver to retain the lead. Vettel had made early progress passing the HRT's, Marussia and Caterhams, but his early progress came at the expense of his right-front wing endplate when he made contact with Senna's left-rear at turn eight switchback on the same lap. Hamilton regained the optimum temperature needed for his tyres and began to pull away from Räikkönen after setting a fastest lap of the race. Alonso closed the gap to Maldonado in second place with the use of DRS in the main straights but was unable to close sufficiently to feign an overtaking manoeuvre because the Williams was fast in a straight line. Vettel chose not to pit for the time being, as the race was interrupted by the intervention of the safety car on lap nine. Rosberg was in the process of overtaking Karthikeyan when Karthikeyan's car began to fail due to a loss of hydraulic pressure which caused his steering to become heavy. Rosberg, caught unaware of Karthikeyan's troubles, hit the back of the HRT and was launched into the barrier, scattering debris onto the circuit in the process. Rosberg and Karthikeyan were unhurt. During the safety car period, Vettel was forced to pit when he swerved to avoid Ricciardo and crashed into the polystyrene bollard marking the start of the first DRS zone, further damaging his wing. Red Bull took the opportunity to pit him early, with the downside being that Vettel would have to do 42 laps on the soft tyre, if he were not to stop again, when supplier Pirelli predicted they could only do 36. Vettel's car was also fitted with a replacement front wing.

Racing resumed at the end of lap 14 when the safety car drove into the pit lane with Hamilton leading Räikkönen. Alonso drove slower than Webber, allowing the Red Bull driver to pull alongside Alonso, but the Ferrari driver maintained third position. Vettel moved up to 19th place after he overtook di Resta and de la Rosa. Hamilton again started to pull away from Räikkönen. Vettel started to battle Grosjean for 17th position and during an overtaking manoeuvre, Vettel drove off the racing line and onto the run-off area, and was required to give 17th back to Grosjean to avoid being issued with a penalty. Vettel came back onto the circuit and passed Grosjean to take over the position. Alonso began to close the gap to Maldonado who was running slower allowing Räikkonen to extend his hold over second place. Vergne allowed Vettel to move into eleventh on lap 20. Hamilton slowed and pulled over to the side of the track with a fuel pressure problem on the same lap, handing the lead to Räikkönen. Alonso passed Maldonado in the second DRS zone by using his KERS system heading into the chicane to move into second one lap later. Webber attempted to pass Maldonado by taking the outside line on lap 23, but the two drivers made contact with Webber spinning onto the run-off area. Both drivers were able to continue and Webber fell down to seventh. When Räikkönen's engineer gave him information over the radio about the gap to second-place Alonso, he responded "Just leave me alone, I know what to do". He later gave his Lotus team T-shirts with the phrase on, after it was widely covered in the media.

On the following lap Maldonado was passed by Button (who took the inside line) for third position, while Vettel moved into the points-scoring positions by passing Ricciardo for tenth on the same lap. Pérez moved in front of Massa for fifth on lap 25, while Vettel passed Schumacher for eighth place on the next lap. Kobayashi made the first scheduled pit stop for tyres on the 26th lap. Webber employed his DRS system on lap 26 on the straight linking turns ten and eleven in an attempt to overtake Massa, and ran on the outside line side-by-side with Massa. Webber ran wide onto the run-off area, and made contact with Massa who was sent into a spin after hitting the kerb at turn twelve. Massa and Schumacher pitted on lap 27 and rejoined in 14th and 15th positions respectively. Alonso pitted for medium compounds tyres on lap 29 and remerged in seventh behind Vettel. On lap 30, Pérez passed Maldonado with the assistance of DRS for fourth place. Maldonado made his pit stop on the same lap and Webber was ordered not to battle Vettel for position. Red Bull called Webber into the pit lane for medium compound tyres on lap 31 allowing Vettel into second. Räikkönen pitted from the lead on lap 32 for medium compound tyres and remained in the lead with Vettel close behind. Button closed the gap between himself and Alonso (after setting a new fastest lap–a 1:46.495–on lap 32) by lap 33 and feigned an overtake at turn 21 but had slight oversteer. Räikkönen began to extend the time gap between himself and Vettel on lap 34 who was preserving the lifespan of his soft compound tyres. Grosjean, fifth, had worn tyres and was caught by di Resta, Pérez and Webber. Vettel was called into the pit lane by Red Bull for their mechanics to fit a new set of soft tyres and remerged in fourth in front of Grosjean.

On lap 39 di Resta forced Pérez wide at turn 13; as Pérez rejoined the circuit, he cut back across the front of Grosjean and the two made contact at the next corner, which in turn forced Grosjean into the path of Webber who was attempting to drive on the inside line and the pair collided. Grosjean and Webber retired because of damage to their cars and the debris on-track from the accident called for the second safety car period of the race. The safety car remained out for three laps, during which marshals cleared the track of debris. Pérez was given a ten-second stop-go penalty by the stewards on the 42nd lap for which he served three laps later. Räikkönen began to rebuild his lead over Alonso once the safety car came in on the end of lap 42. Alonso was also being harried by Button; Button himself was being harried by Vettel in fourth. Vettel was in the tow of Button heading towards turn eight and got a run on the McLaren driver driving into turn eleven but was unable to pass. Button and Vettel's duel allowed Alonso to break free, and he started chasing down Räikkönen in the last five laps. Vettel tried again on lap 48 and took the outside line to attempt a pass heading into turn eleven, but Button defended his position. Four laps later Vettel lined up another passing manoeuvre on Button (who went wide heading into turn ten) by employing his DRS in the run up to turn eleven and passed the McLaren driver around the outside to take over third place.

Alonso drew to within 1.9 seconds of Räikkönen on lap 53, but was unable to get close enough to challenge the Lotus driver, who held on to secure his only victory of the season (and Lotus’ first ever), and became the eighth driver to win a race in the 2012 season. Alonso was second, 0.8 seconds behind Räikkönen with Vettel third. Button finished fourth. Maldonado took fifth despite not being able to use his car's KERS after the first safety car period. He was seven seconds ahead of a close group comprising Kobayashi, Massa, Senna and di Resta. Massa closed on the Sauber driver late in the race, who was affected by an issue with downshifting and was unable to fully recharge his KERS, and Senna and di Resta reduced the time gap to Massa who maintained their positions throughout the remainder of the race. Ricciardo held off Schumacher in the final five laps to secure the final points-scoring position in tenth. Vergne was classified in twelfth place, with Kovalainen, Glock, Pérez, Petrov and de la Rosa the last of the classified finishers.

=== Post-race ===
The top three drivers appeared on the podium to collect their trophies and in a later press conference. Räikkonen said that he was "very happy" for the Lotus team and himself after a difficult second half of the season. He also stated the development of his car helped to increase his straight line speed although he later revealed that he was using the same car from the Korean Grand Prix. Alonso was pleased with his second-place result but also felt Ferrari was not the most competitive team over the race weekend. He also felt the modifications that Ferrari brought helped him to become quicker. Vettel said that despite starting the race from the pit lane he still believed he could finish in the top three. He also denied that his result was a "surprise" to him and Red Bull as he believed that he was fast enough to catch up to the leaders. During the podium interviews which were conducted by former driver and BBC commentator David Coulthard, Räikkönen and Vettel swore. The swearing which was broadcast on live television prompted an apology from Vettel, and led to the FIA director of communications Norman Howell to write a letter to the teams at the request of FIA president Jean Todt reminding drivers over the issue and stated disciplinary action would be enacted in the future.

Hamilton said that he was disappointed after the race, having been the leader until he retired with a loss of fuel pressure on lap 20. The McLaren driver stated: "I'm gutted; I'd had really good pace all weekend and I feel certain we could have won today." Nevertheless, he also said that he would like to try and win the final two races of the season. Ricciardo said he was mystified as to how Vettel hit a trackside polystyrene board during the safety car period, "I have to look and see if I did anything wrong but he should be watching me. Everyone was doing the same thing, it's exactly what you do under the safety car." Vettel later represented the incident as less important and admitted that Ricciardo caught him off guard, "Maybe I should have paid more attention but I went to the right and I wasn't very lucky that there was the DRS board, which I took head-on."

=== Race classification ===
Pos	No	Driver	Constructor	Laps	Time/Retired	Grid	Points
1	9	(Finland) Kimi Räikkönen	Lotus-Renault	55	1:45:58.667	4	25
2	5	(Spain) Fernando Alonso	Ferrari	55	+0.852	6	18
3	1	(Germany) Sebastian Vettel	Red Bull-Renault	55	+4.163	PL	15
4	3	(United Kingdom) Jenson Button	McLaren-Mercedes	55	+7.787	5	12
5	18	(Venezuela) Pastor Maldonado	Williams-Renault	55	+13.007	3	10
6	14	(Japan) Kamui Kobayashi	Sauber-Ferrari	55	+20.076	15	8
7	6	(Brazil) Felipe Massa	Ferrari	55	+22.896	8	6
8	19	(Brazil) Bruno Senna	Williams-Renault	55	+23.542	14	4
9	11	(United Kingdom) Paul di Resta	Force India-Mercedes	55	+24.160	12	2
10	16	(Australia) Daniel Ricciardo	Toro Rosso-Ferrari	55	+27.463	16	1
11	7	(Germany) Michael Schumacher	Mercedes	55	+28.075	13	
12	17	(France) Jean-Éric Vergne	Toro Rosso-Ferrari	55	+34.906	17	
13	20	(Finland) Heikki Kovalainen	Caterham-Renault	55	+47.764	18	
14	24	(Germany) Timo Glock	Marussia-Cosworth	55	+56.473	21	
15	15	(Mexico) Sergio Pérez	Sauber-Ferrari	55	+56.768	11	
16	21	(Russia) Vitaly Petrov	Caterham-Renault	55	+1:04.595	20	
17	22	(Spain) Pedro de la Rosa	HRT-Cosworth	55	+1:11.778	PL^{1}	
Ret	25	(France) Charles Pic	Marussia-Cosworth	41	Engine	19	
Ret	10	(France) Romain Grosjean	Lotus-Renault	37	Collision	9	
Ret	2	(Australia) Mark Webber	Red Bull-Renault	37	Collision	2	
Ret	4	(United Kingdom) Lewis Hamilton	McLaren-Mercedes	19	Fuel pressure	1	
Ret	23	(India) Narain Karthikeyan	HRT-Cosworth	7	Hydraulics/Collision	23	
Ret	8	(Germany) Nico Rosberg	Mercedes	7	Collision	7	
Ret	12	(Germany) Nico Hülkenberg	Force India-Mercedes	0	Collision	10	

Notes:

- ^1 – Pedro de la Rosa failed to start the formation lap when a cord from one of his tyre blankets became caught up in the wheel, and he therefore started in the pit lane behind Sebastian Vettel.

== Championship standings after the race ==
Drivers' Championship standings

Pos.	Driver	Points
1	(Germany) **Sebastian Vettel***	255
2	(Spain) **Fernando Alonso***	245
3	(Finland) Kimi Räikkönen	198
4	(Australia) Mark Webber	167
5	(United Kingdom) Lewis Hamilton	165

Constructors' Championship standings

Pos.	Constructor	Points
1	(Austria) **Red Bull-Renault***	422
2	(Italy) **Ferrari***	340
3	(United Kingdom) McLaren-Mercedes	318
4	(United Kingdom) Lotus-Renault	288
5	(Germany) Mercedes	136

- Note: Only the top five positions are included for both sets of standings.
- Teams and drivers in bold and with an asterisk had a mathematical possibility of winning the title.

== See also ==
- 2012 Yas Marina Circuit V8 Supercar Event

Previous race: 2012 Indian Grand Prix	FIA Formula One World Championship; 2012 season	Next race: 2012 United States Grand Prix
Previous race: 2011 Abu Dhabi Grand Prix	Abu Dhabi Grand Prix	Next race: 2013 Abu Dhabi Grand Prix
