= Pastor Maldonado =

Venezuelan racing driver (born 1985)

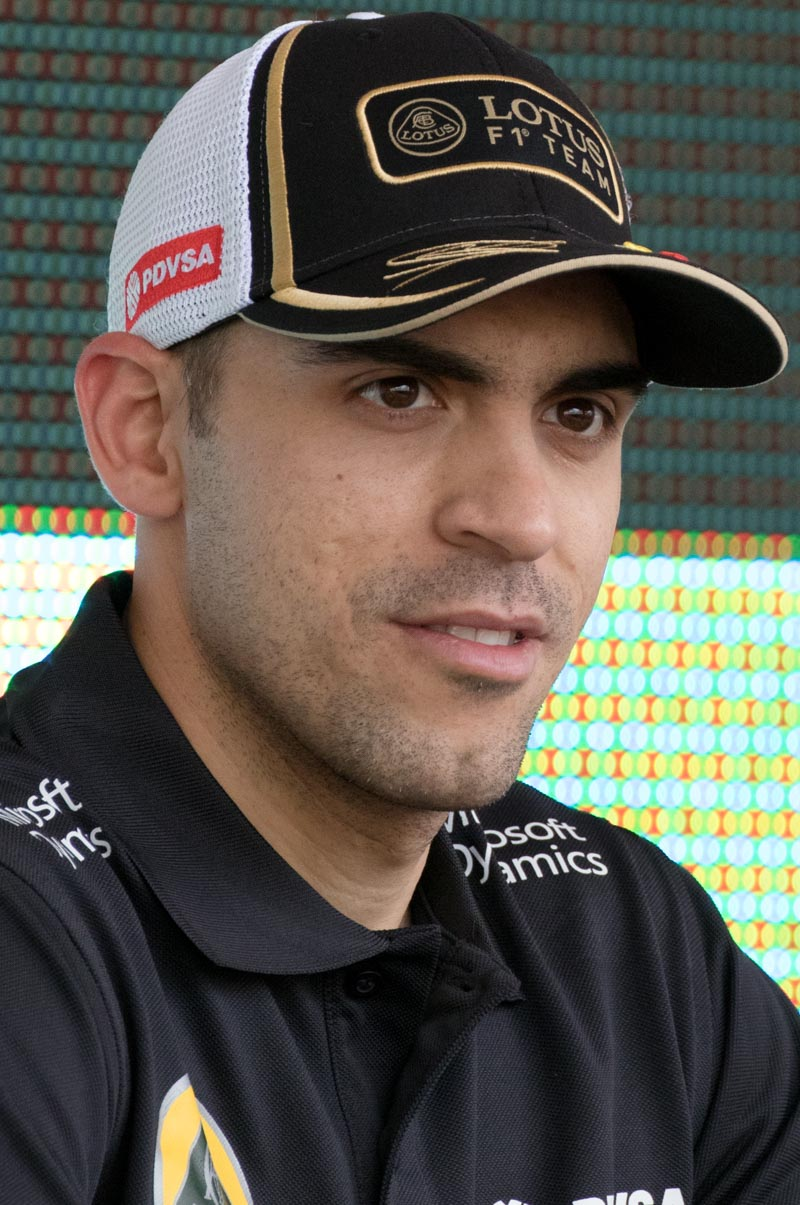
- Maldonado at the 2015 Malaysian Grand Prix
- Born: Pastor Rafael Maldonado Motta; 9 March 1985 (age 41); Maracay, Aragua, Venezuela
- Spouse: Gabriela Tarkanyi (m. 2012)
- Children: 2
- Family: Manuel Maldonado (cousin)

Formula One World Championship career
- Nationality: (Venezuela) Venezuelan
- Active years: 2011–2015
- Team(s): Williams, Lotus
- Car number: 13
- Entries: 96 (95 starts)
- Championships: 0
- Wins: 1
- Podiums: 1
- Career points: 76
- Pole positions: 1
- Fastest laps: 0
- First entry: 2011 Australian Grand Prix
- First win: 2012 Spanish Grand Prix
- Last entry: 2015 Abu Dhabi Grand Prix

FIA World Endurance Championship career
- Categorisation: FIA Platinum
- Years active: 2018–19
- Teams: DragonSpeed
- Starts: 8
- Championships: 0
- Wins: 1
- Podiums: 4
- Poles: 2
- Fastest laps: 1
- Best finish: 3rd in 2018–19 (LMP2)

24 Hours of Le Mans career
- Years: 2018–2019
- Teams: DragonSpeed
- Best finish: 9th (2018)
- Class wins: 0

Pastor Rafael Maldonado Motta (Spanish pronunciation: [pasˈtoɾ maldoˈnaðo]; born 9 March 1985) is a Venezuelan former racing driver, who competed in Formula One from 2011 to 2015. Maldonado won the 2012 Spanish Grand Prix with Williams.

After winning the GP2 Series in 2010 with Rapax, Maldonado competed in Formula One for Williams and Lotus, winning the Spanish Grand Prix in 2012 with the former. He was replaced by Kevin Magnussen at the reformed Renault team for 2016, becoming a test driver for Pirelli. Maldonado returned to racing in 2018 at the FIA World Endurance Championship, finishing third in the LMP2 class with DragonSpeed before taking a class win at the 24 Hours of Daytona in 2019.

== Early life ==
Maldonado was born on 9 March 1985 in Maracay, Venezuela. He showed an early interest in racing, preferring to watch his uncles driving their YMCA go-karts. When Maldonado was four years old, he started competing in BMX racing and won a national championship.

== Career ==
=== Karting ===
Maldonado was invited to Kartódromo Carmencita Hernández in 1992 and was impressed with the karts that were running on the track. After that, he convinced his father to let him drive one. A year later, Maldonado had his first appearances in karting championships. Since at the time there was no proper category for his age, he competed against kids that were 10–12 years old.

=== Formula Renault ===
Maldonado's first experience of formula racing was in Italy in 2003. He competed in the Italian Formula Renault Championship with Cram Competition, and was classified seventh in the drivers' championship. His notable results included three podium finishes and one pole position. Cram Competition also entered one round of the German Formula Renault Championship at Oschersleben.

In 2004, Maldonado ran a dual programme in Italian and Formula Renault 2000 Eurocup with Cram Competition. He won the Italian title, with eight wins and six pole positions from seventeen starts. In the European championship, he was classified eighth overall, with two wins. Maldonado also found the time to enter one round of the now defunct Formula Renault V6 Eurocup at Spa-Francorchamps, with a best finish of fifth place.

In November 2004, Maldonado was given an opportunity to test with the Minardi Formula One team at Misano in Italy. The team's former owner, Giancarlo Minardi, was present at the test and commented positively about Maldonado's performance.

=== Italian F3000 ===
In 2005, Maldonado progressed out of Formula Renault, but did not get the opportunity to complete a full season in any one series. He made four starts in the Italian F3000 Championship with Sighinolfi Auto Racing, in which one race win at the Autodromo dell'Umbria was enough to finish ninth overall. He also entered nine races (and made seven starts) in the Spanish-based World Series by Renault, with a best finish of seventh. However, his participation in the WSR was marred by a four-race ban for dangerous driving. He failed to slow down at the scene of an accident at Monaco, despite the presence of warning flags, and struck and seriously injured a marshal.

=== Formula Renault 3.5 ===
Maldonado secured a full-time drive in the Formula Renault 3.5 Series with Draco Racing in 2006. He was classified third overall, with three race wins, six further podium finishes, and five pole positions.

In a season that was marked by controversy, Maldonado could have won the title were it not for a disqualification from first place at Misano for a technical infringement. Draco Racing lodged an appeal and the results of the championship remained provisional until Italy's National Court of Appeal for Motorsport upheld the stewards' decision at a hearing in January 2007. The lost fifteen points would have been enough to move him up from third to first in the standings, ahead of Alx Danielsson and Borja García.

=== GP2 Series ===
Maldonado's performances in FR3.5 were enough to attract the interest of GP2 teams, and he signed a contract to drive for Trident Racing in 2007 after a successful test in late 2006. He took his first victory in only his fourth race in the series with a commanding win at Monaco. However, he had to miss the final four rounds of the season after breaking a collarbone during training, leaving him outside the championship top-ten.

Maldonado moved to the Piquet Sports team for 2008, his second year in the series. At midseason, he had two poles and two podiums. He had a farcical sprint race in the wet at Silverstone – he stalled on the dummy grid, picked up a penalty for speeding in the pitlane as he joined the race, another penalty for passing under yellow flags, and crashed into Adrián Vallés and Kamui Kobayashi on the final lap. He started at the back of the grid for the Hungary feature race, but he moved up to finish fifth after staying out for longer than any other driver, and setting a succession of quick laps on these worn tyres. Four podium finishes—including a win at Spa—in the final six races saw him rise to fifth place in the drivers' championship by the end of the season.

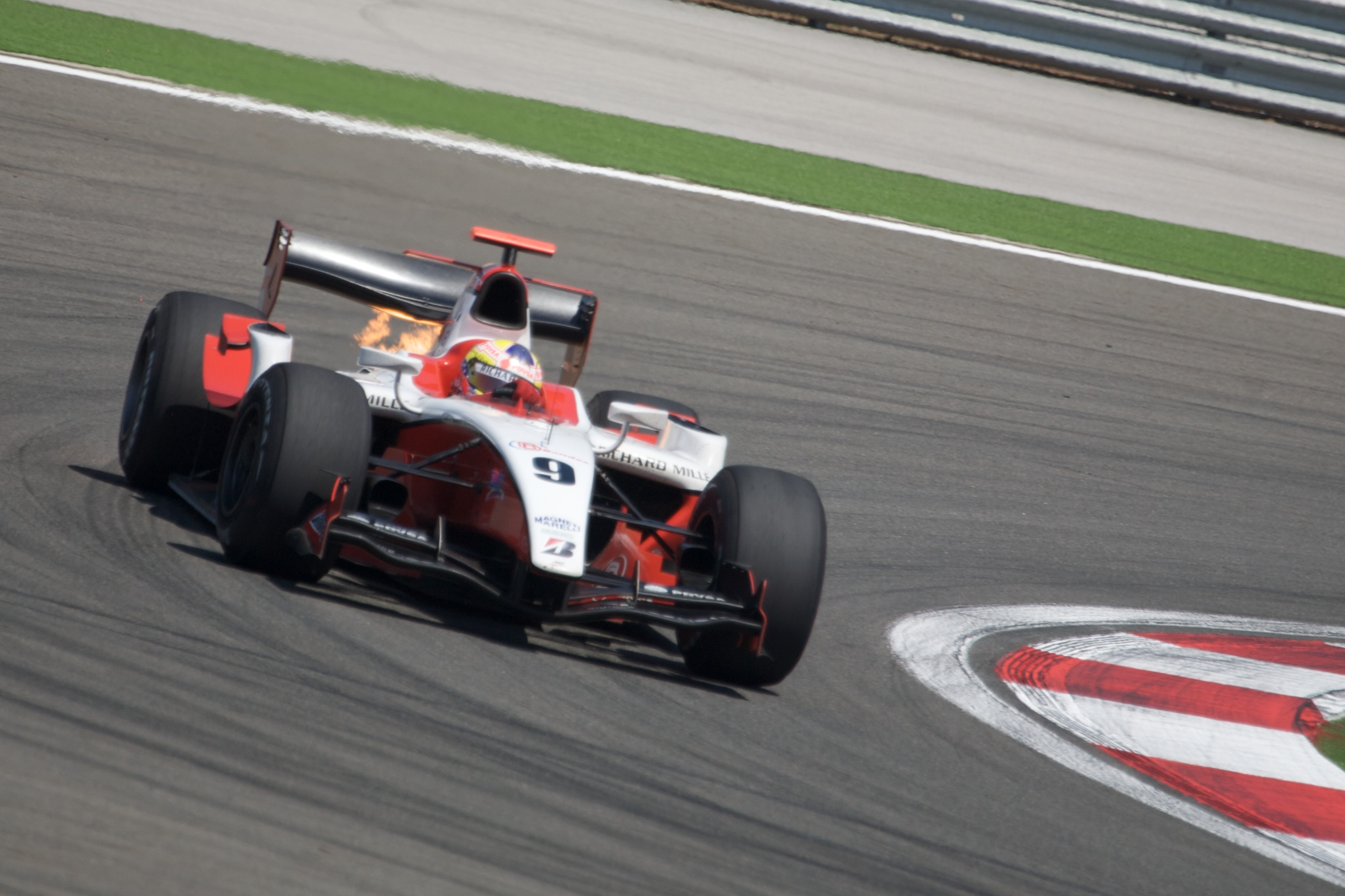
Maldonado driving for ART Grand Prix at the Turkish round of the 2009 GP2 Series season

Maldonado signed to drive for the ART Grand Prix team during the 2009 season. As part of the deal, he also joined the team for three rounds of the 2008–09 GP2 Asia Series. Maldonado was often overshadowed by team-mate and 2009 champion Nico Hülkenberg, but Maldonado still finished sixth overall, helping ART to the teams title. He competed in the first round of the 2009 Euroseries 3000 season at the Autódromo Internacional do Algarve for Teamcraft Motorsport to gain experience of the track for the GP2 season finale. Maldonado won the first race, having started from second position.

Maldonado drove for the Rapax Team in the 2010 GP2 Series alongside Luiz Razia. He clinched the Championship in the penultimate event at Monza, Maldonado won six consecutive feature races on his way to winning the title (from Istanbul Park to Spa), which also took him to a total of ten race victories in GP2, which is a series record. Maldonado finished sixteen points ahead of Barwa Addax's Sergio Pérez. Rapax also won the Teams' Championship, five points ahead of Barwa Addax.

=== Formula One ===
Maldonado was a target for a Campos Meta seat in 2010. Campos team principal Adrián Campos said that Bruno Senna's team mate could be Pedro de la Rosa, Vitaly Petrov or Maldonado, but the team's financial problems and change of ownership changed the situation, and Karun Chandhok got the drive. It was then reported that Maldonado was close to signing a deal to be test and reserve driver for the Stefan Grand Prix team, which attempted to compete in the 2010 season following the withdrawal of the US F1 Team, which left a theoretical space for another new team. Stefan was barred from competing in the 2010 season.

==== Williams (2011–2013) ====
Towards the end of the 2010 season, Maldonado was linked to the Williams team for 2011, replacing former GP2 team-mate Nico Hülkenberg alongside Rubens Barrichello. He took part in the end-of-season young driver test at the Yas Marina Circuit in Abu Dhabi, driving for Williams and Hispania Racing, the rebranded Campos team. On 15 November, Williams confirmed that Hülkenberg had been dropped from the team's 2011 line-up, and Maldonado was duly announced as his replacement on 1 December. In addition to his on-track record, Maldonado also brought sponsorship from the Venezuelan government (through the state-owned PDVSA oil company) to the team.

===== 2011 =====
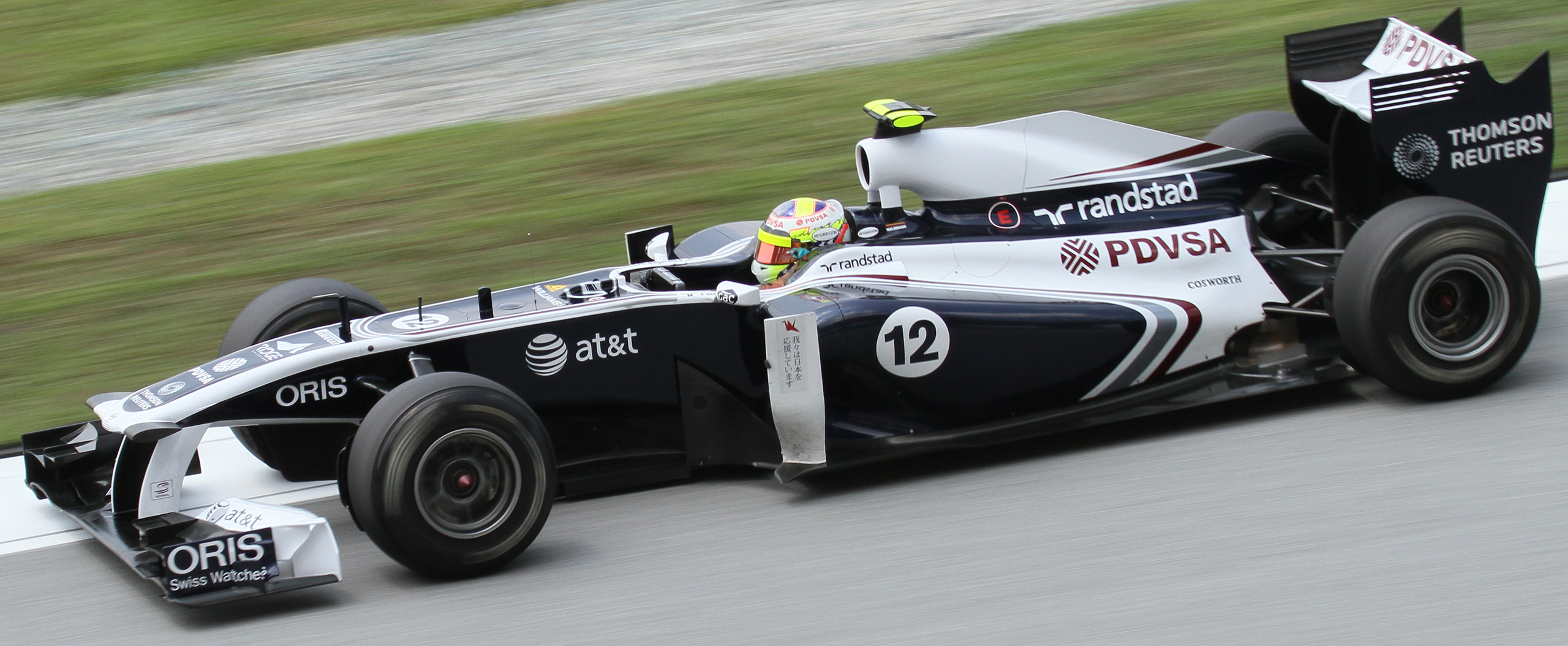
Maldonado driving for Williams at the Malaysian Grand Prix

Maldonado retired from his first race, the Australian Grand Prix, due to transmission problems. In the Malaysian Grand Prix, he failed to reach Q2 in qualifying and again dropped out of the race. He recorded his first finish in China, in eighteenth place. At the Spanish Grand Prix he reached Q3 for the first time, eventually qualifying in ninth position for the race. He made it into Q3 again in Monaco, qualifying eighth, and in the race was lying sixth with five laps remaining, when he collided with Lewis Hamilton, taking him out of the race. He then spun out of a very wet race in Canada. He then continued to have impressive qualifying pace with poor race pace at Britain, Germany, and Hungary, including a drive-through penalty at the latter for speeding in the pit lane. At the Belgian Grand Prix at Spa in qualifying, Maldonado was involved in an incident with Lewis Hamilton on an in-lap after Hamilton squeezed by him when both were on a hot lap. Maldonado appeared to swipe across Hamilton as they headed down to Eau Rouge. Maldonado received a five-place grid penalty for his actions and Hamilton a reprimand. But in the race he scored his first point in Formula One with a tenth-place finish. Maldonado did not score any more points for the rest of the season, nor did he reach Q3 for the rest of the season. His poor end to the season was magnified in Abu Dhabi; where he qualified 17th and started 23rd (after a ten-place grid penalty for using a ninth engine), and served a drive-through, and later a 30-second time penalty after the race, both for ignoring blue flags.

Maldonado finished nineteenth in the Drivers' Championship and on 1 December 2011, it was confirmed that he would be retained by Williams for the 2012 season.

===== 2012 =====
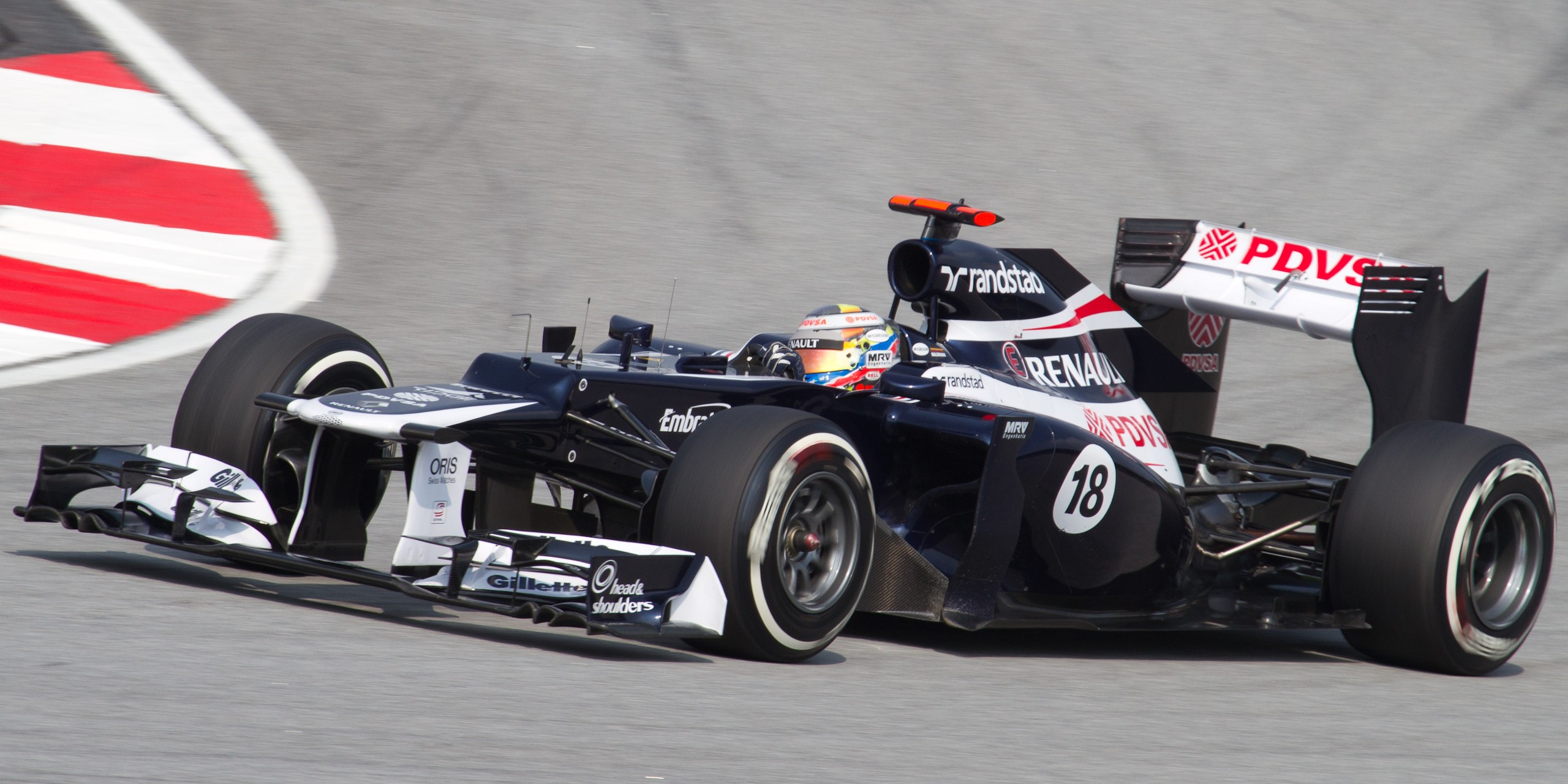
Maldonado driving for Williams at the 2012 Malaysian Grand Prix

Maldonado began the 2012 season alongside Brazil's Bruno Senna, for Williams. He started the season with promising pace, qualifying eighth for the Australian Grand Prix. In the race, he was running strongly until he crashed out on the final lap, fighting with Fernando Alonso for fifth position. In the Malaysian Grand Prix, Maldonado retired in the closing stages of the race while running in the points. He scored his first points of the season by finishing eighth in China. A puncture ended his race in Bahrain, after he qualified in seventeenth position. At the Spanish Grand Prix, Maldonado qualified second, next to Lewis Hamilton on the front row of the grid after strong pace from his Williams car during the race weekend. Maldonado was later promoted to his first pole position in his Formula One career after Hamilton was excluded from the results of qualifying, due to having insufficient fuel in his car. Maldonado was beaten to the first corner by Fernando Alonso, but regained the lead after the second round of pit stops. Maldonado held his lead after the third pit-stop phase, and held off Alonso and Kimi Räikkönen to win, becoming the first Venezuelan driver to finish on a Grand Prix podium in the process. He remains the most recent Williams driver to win a race as of September 2025. During post-race celebrations, a fire engulfed the Williams pit, and Maldonado was seen carrying his cousin to safety.

At Monaco, he received a ten-place grid penalty for causing an avoidable collision with Sergio Pérez during a practice session (which subsequently may have led to Pérez's crash in qualifying, which caused the session to be red-flagged) and an additional five-place penalty for a gearbox change, meaning he started 24th and last on the grid. He retired due to an accident at the start of the race, when he ran into the back of Pedro de la Rosa's HRT who also retired with rear wing damage. At the end of second qualifying session in Canada, Maldonado crashed into the infamous Wall of Champions at the end of the lap in which he set the quickest sector 1 time, and was on course to bump Jenson Button out of Q3. Maldonado finished the qualifying session 17th and started the race from 22nd position after a five-place grid penalty after he was forced to change his gearbox due to damage suffered in the crash. Maldonado made good progress in the first stint, running as high as tenth mid-race, however after his pitstop he dropped back to seventeenth and finished the race in thirteenth place.

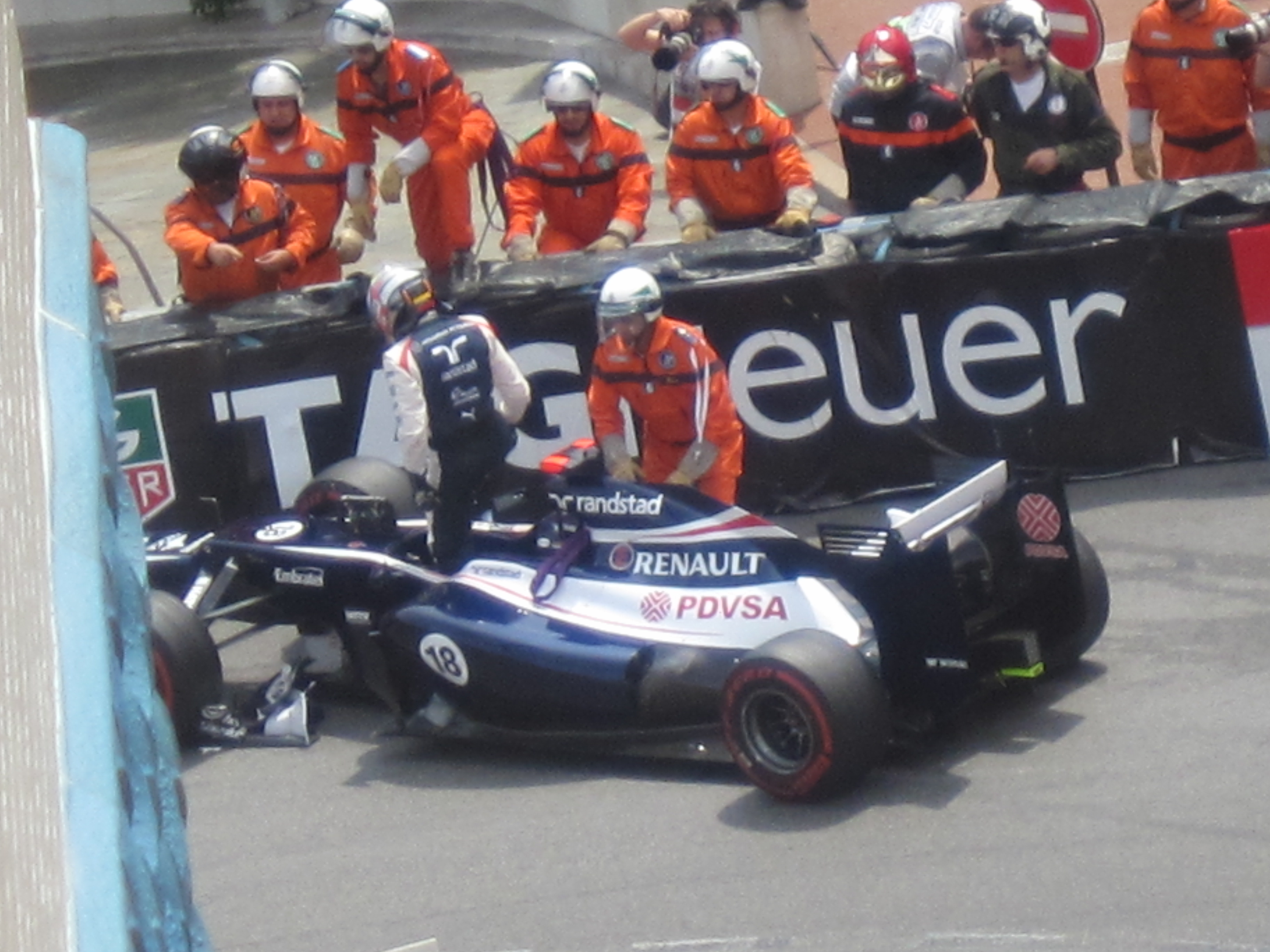
Maldonado crashes his car at the 2012 Monaco Grand Prix

In Europe, Maldonado qualified third but dropped to fifth after the start and tenth after pitting under a safety car halfway through the race. Maldonado then passed several drivers including Red Bull's Mark Webber and was running fourth in the closing stages of the race. On lap 56 (the penultimate lap of the race), Maldonado was battling with McLaren's Lewis Hamilton for third place, however Hamilton forced Maldonado off the track at turn 12 and Maldonado returned to track and collided with Hamilton in turn 13, with Maldonado losing steering on the high curbs. Maldonado was able to continue and finished tenth with a broken front wing; Hamilton retired after he crashed into the tyre wall. Maldonado blamed Hamilton for the incident, however the stewards gave Maldonado a 20-second time penalty which dropped Maldonado out of the points to twelfth position. Maldonado qualified seventh in the British Grand Prix and ran as high as sixth before a pit-stop on lap 11 which dropped him into the midfield. Maldonado was subsequently involved in a collision with Sergio Pérez, which dropped him to last while Pérez retired on the spot. Maldonado eventually finished sixteenth, a lap down on winner Mark Webber. In television interviews, Pérez was damning of Maldonado's driving, calling him too dangerous and claiming he ruined other people's races. Pérez also called for the stewards to take tough action against Maldonado. Maldonado said the collision was a racing incident. The stewards penalised Maldonado by a reprimand and a fine of €10,000 with two penalties given due to the "serious nature" of the incident.

In Germany, Maldonado qualified a strong sixth in the wet qualifying, however he lost pace from lap 12 of the race when he hit debris which damaged his car, and finished the race in fifteenth. In Hungary, Maldonado qualified eighth, but a poor start dropped him to twelfth after lap one and thirteenth after the pitstops. Maldonado received a drive-through penalty for "causing an avoidable collision" in an overtaking move on Force India's Paul di Resta for twelfth; he dropped behind di Resta after the penalty and finished thirteenth. Maldonado was eleventh in the World Championship on 29 points as Formula One entered a five-week summer break, with his only points finishes coming from his win in Spain and eighth in China.

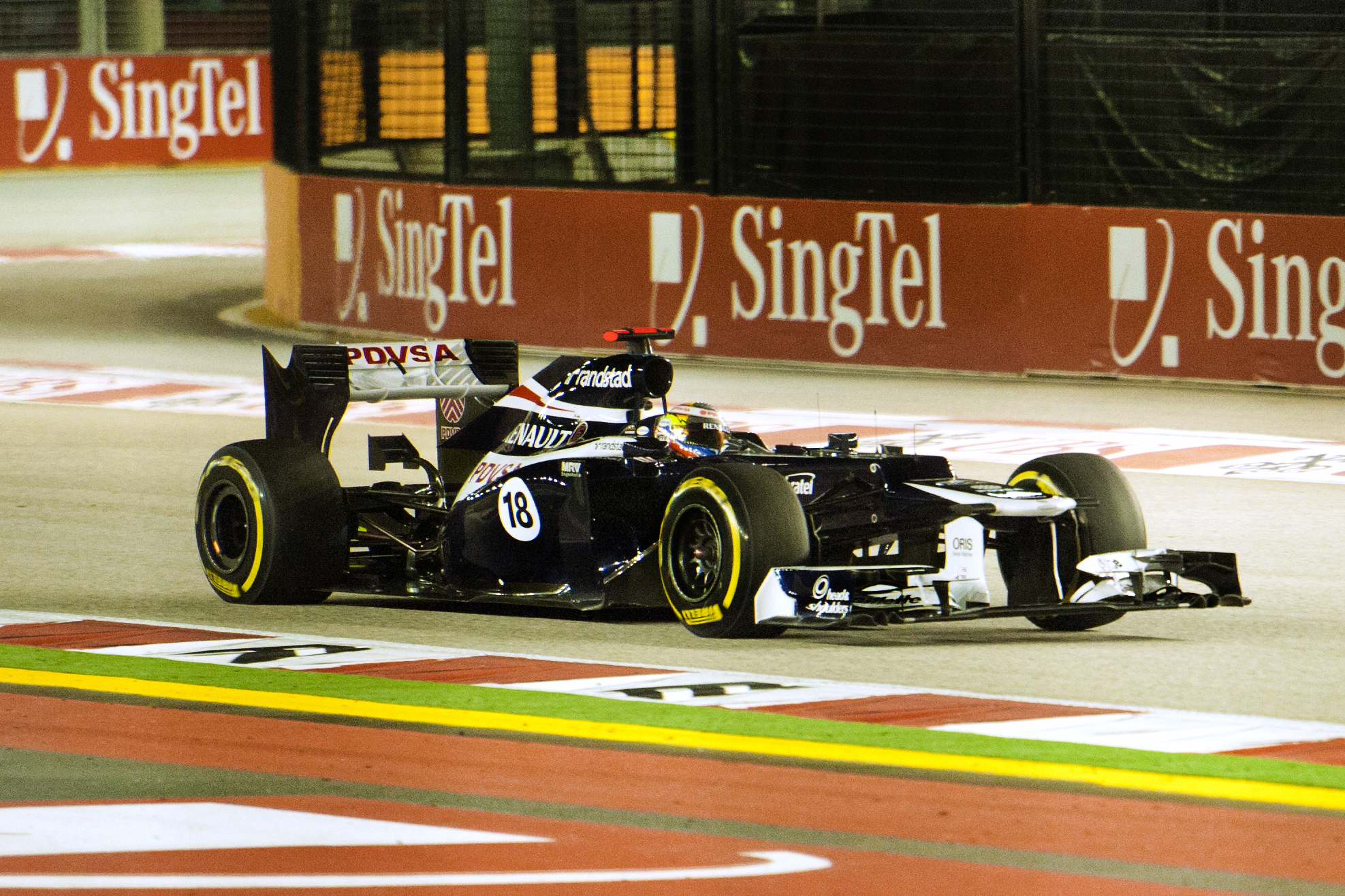
Maldonado started on the front row for the second time at Singapore.

At the Belgian Grand Prix, Maldonado received a further three penalties. He was demoted from third on the grid to sixth for impeding Nico Hülkenberg in Q1. He then jumped the start of the race, and was deemed to cause a collision with Marussia's Timo Glock, resulting in two separate five-place grid penalties, so was demoted by ten places in Monza. Maldonado started the race in 22nd and finished in 11th, just 0.5 seconds behind Senna, who finished in the final points-paying position. In Singapore he qualified second, alongside pole-sitter Lewis Hamilton. In the race, he was in contention for a podium finish, retiring on lap 37 due to a hydraulic failure. In Japan Maldonado qualified 14th, starting 12th and finished the race eighth, his first points finish since he won in Spain nearly five months earlier.

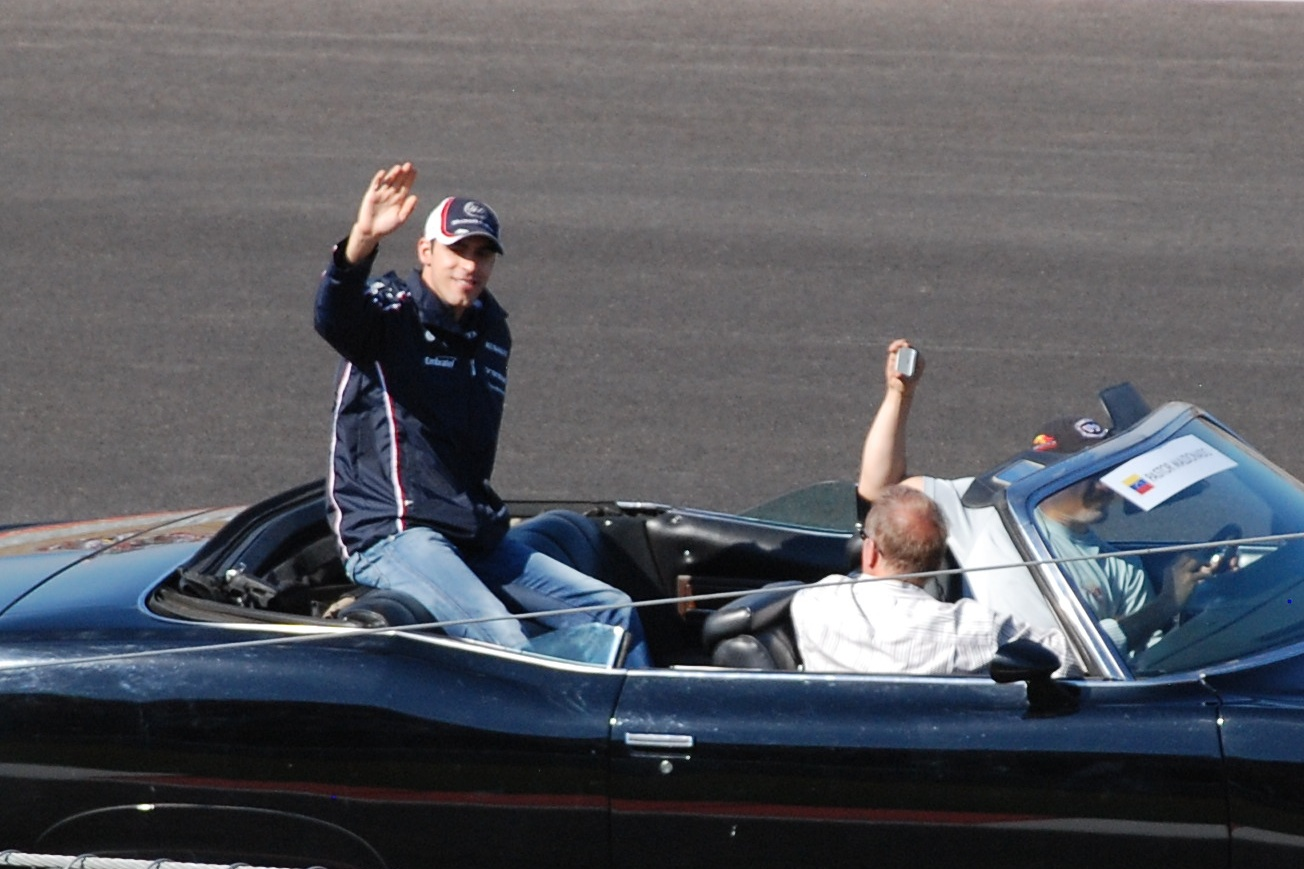
Maldonado at the 2012 United States Grand Prix

Williams' form took a turn for the worse in Korea and Maldonado finished in 14th place after qualifying 15th. He once again managed to get into Q3 in India, but a mistake on his final attempt left him 9th on the grid. His race was disappointing as he got his tyre punctured by Kobayashi after having passed the Sauber driver. He eventually finished 16th. Maldonado returned to the sharp end of the grid in Abu Dhabi where he qualified fourth, which became third as Vettel was excluded from qualifying due to having insufficient fuel in his car. He kept third place at the start and was running at the same pace as cars around him until his KERS unit failed after the first safety car period of the race. Without KERS his car lost pace and he fell back to eventually finish fifth. Maldonado finished the season with a ninth place from ninth on the grid in the USA and a DNF after a second lap crash from sixteenth from the grid after a ten place penalty for a third reprimand after missing a weighbridge check in Brazil, as he finished fifteenth in the Championship on 45 points, the lowest Championship standing for a driver who won a race during an F1 season. Maldonado also received 14 penalties throughout the season, five ahead of Sergio Pérez and Michael Schumacher, Maldonado's grid penalties for both driving offences and gearbox changes totaled to 38 grid places, 1.8 per race.

===== 2013 =====
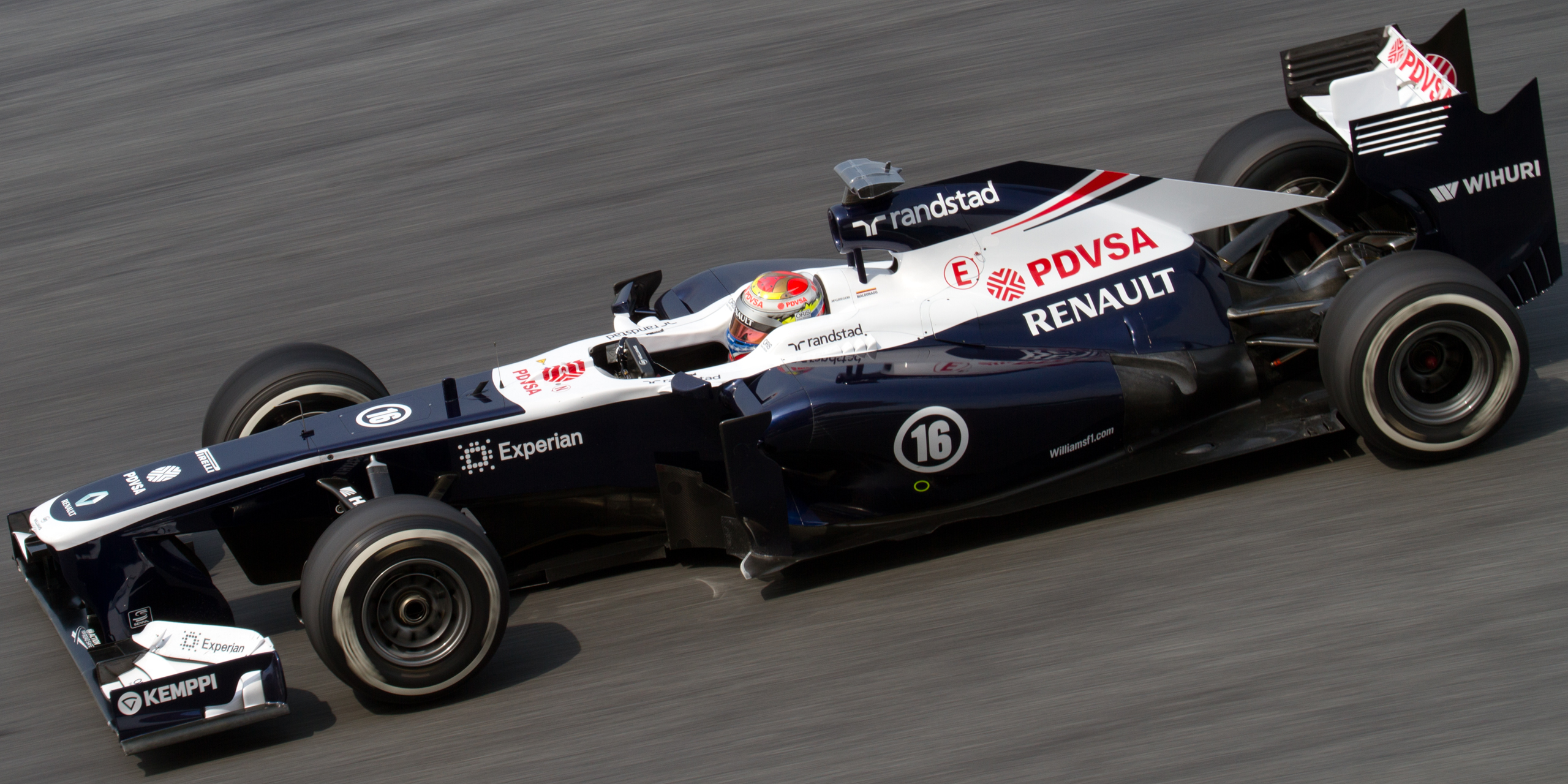
Maldonado during practice at the 2013 Malaysian Grand Prix

On 28 November 2012, Maldonado was retained by Williams for the 2013 season, where he was partnered by Finnish rookie Valtteri Bottas. At the start of the season Maldonado commented that the new FW35 chassis was a step back towards where the team were in 2011. He failed to make it out of the first qualifying session at the first race, the Australian Grand Prix, and qualified in 17th position, one place behind Bottas. Maldonado spun out in the race after 24 laps and consequently retired. At the following round in Malaysia, Maldonado did make the second qualifying session but was caught out by the rain meaning he failed to set a time and started the race 16th. He was running in 15th place in the closing stages of the race when he retired again – his third in succession in Malaysia – due to a KERS failure.

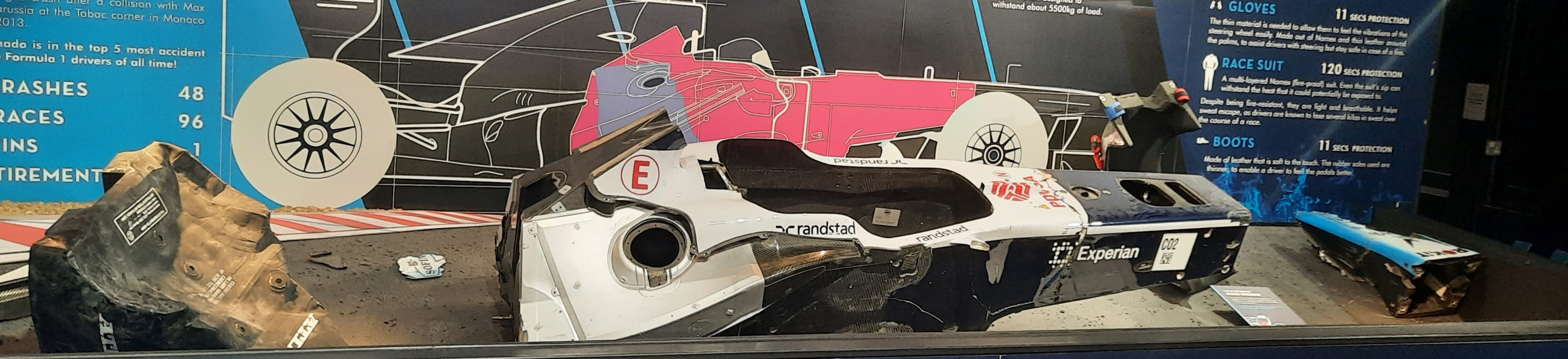
The recovered remains of Maldonado's crashed Williams from the 2013 Monaco Grand Prix. Photographed at the Haynes International Motor Museum in 2024.

At the 2013 Monaco Grand Prix, Maldonado and Chilton collided – when Maldonado overtook Chilton who stated he had not seen the Williams next to him entering the corner – and this brought out the red flag as the barrier became dislodged in the incident. Maldonado was not hurt in the crash. In the week following the announcement that Maldonado would not remain with the Williams team in 2014, Maldonado accused his team of sabotage at the United States Grand Prix.

==== Lotus (2014–2015) ====
On 29 November 2013, Maldonado was signed by the Lotus F1 team, to partner Romain Grosjean in 2014. He drove with number 13, which was barely used in Formula One before. Maldonado's engineer was Mark Slade, who previously engineered for Kimi Räikkönen.

===== 2014 =====
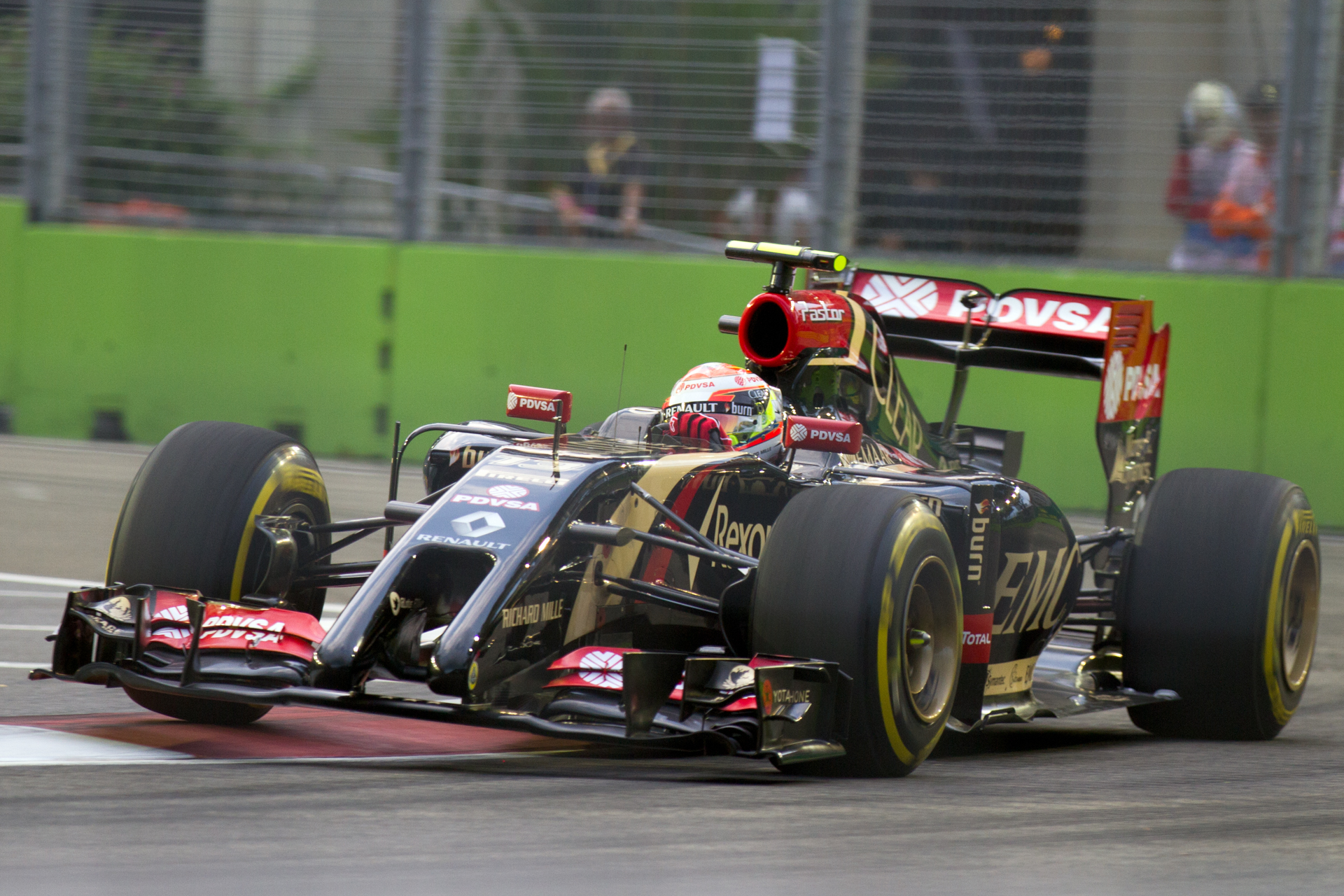
Maldonado at the 2014 Singapore Grand Prix

At the Bahrain Grand Prix, Maldonado collided with Esteban Gutiérrez after making a pit stop, causing Gutiérrez's car to roll. For causing the incident, Maldonado was given a ten-second stop-go penalty during the race, and after the race, three points on his FIA Super Licence, and a five-place grid penalty for the Chinese Grand Prix. At the Chinese Grand Prix, Maldonado crashed into a wall in the pit lane during free practice. At the Spanish Grand Prix, Maldonado crashed into the wall in the first part of qualifying. During the race the following day, Maldonado was deemed to have caused a collision when trying to pass Marcus Ericsson, and was given a five-second stop-go penalty. He was also given a point on his FIA Super Licence after the race, his fourth of the season. At Silverstone, Maldonado again collided with Esteban Gutiérrez, launching his car spectacularly into the air although he was able to finish the race.

In Hungary, Maldonado lost control of his Lotus while heading to the grid, and in the race he crashed in to Jules Bianchi when attempting an overtake. At Spa-Francorchamps, Maldonado crashed during the second free practice session; the force of the impact required Maldonado to have a precautionary check-up at the circuit's medical centre. At the Singapore Grand Prix, Maldonado crashed during the second free practice session, causing a red flag. At the United States Grand Prix, Maldonado received a penalty for speeding behind the safety car, and another penalty for speeding in the pit lane, but still came home in ninth, registering his first – and ultimately, only – points-scoring finish of the 2014 season. He finished the season 16th in the Drivers' Championship.

===== 2015 =====
Maldonado continued to drive for Lotus in the 2015 season. In March 2015, before the season started, the Lotus car suffered a brake failure causing him to crash during testing at Catalunya. At the Australian Grand Prix, Maldonado was hit by Felipe Nasr and crashed out of the race at the second corner of the first lap after he overtook three cars at the start and was in sixth position. At the Malaysian Grand Prix, Maldonado's car suffered a puncture after he was hit by Valtteri Bottas, and he was later given a ten-second time penalty for speeding behind the safety car. He accrued three penalty points on his licence for the infringement, taking his tally to eight within the previous year. At the Chinese Grand Prix, Maldonado suffered a brake issue that caused him to go off-track when entering the pits, and had to be recovered by the marshals. A couple of laps later, he spun the car. On lap 49, Maldonado was hit by Jenson Button in a braking zone and spun; Maldonado was later forced to retire. At the start of the Bahrain Grand Prix, Maldonado parked his car in the wrong grid slot, and accordingly, was given a five-second time penalty. On the first lap of the race, Maldonado was hit by Max Verstappen, damaging Verstappen's front wing; Maldonado also was hit by Massa's car, damaging its floor. Following the race, Maldonado admitted that his reputation for crashing comes because he takes more risks as he approaches the limits.

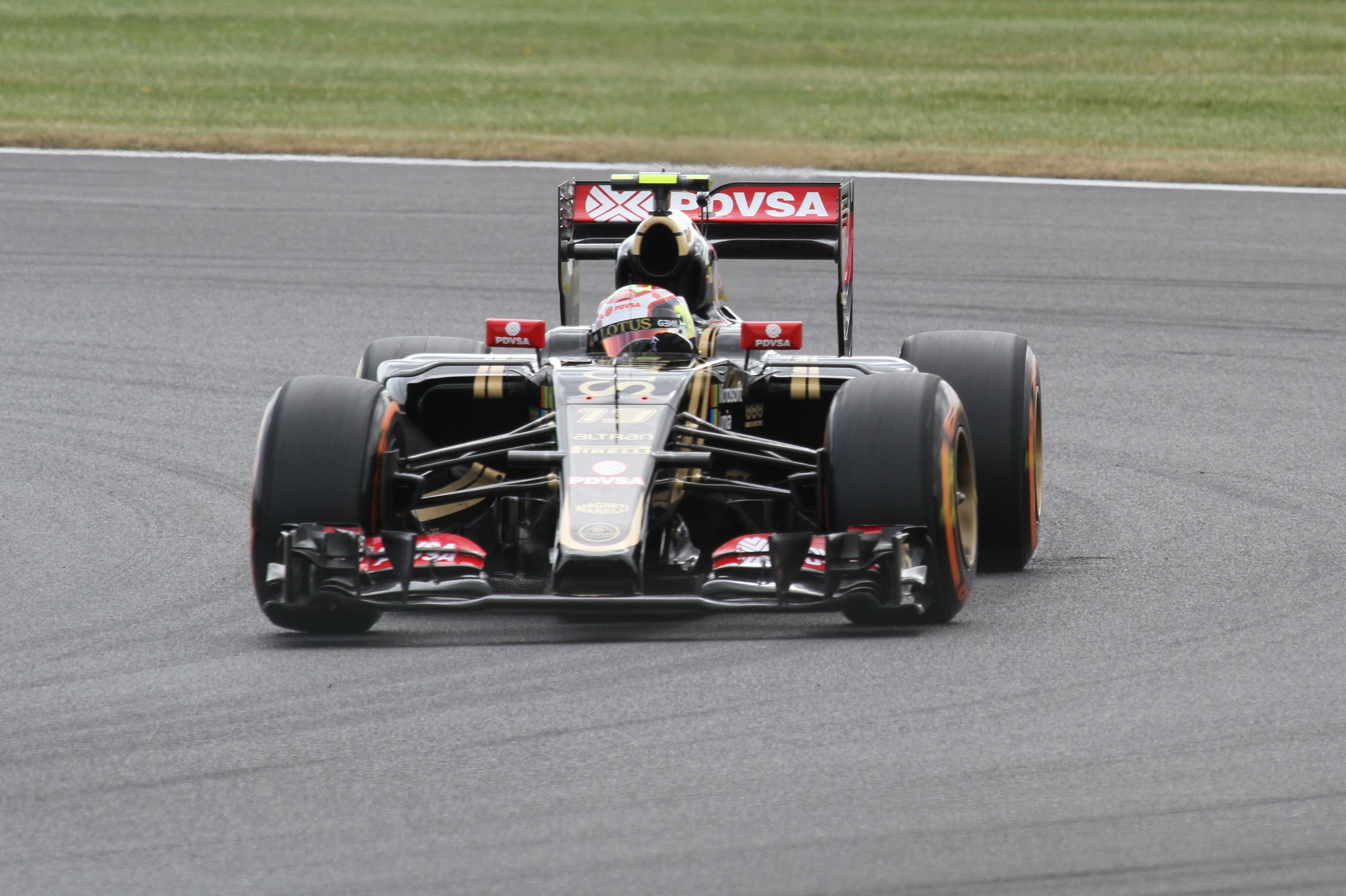
Maldonado at the 2015 British Grand Prix

At the Spanish Grand Prix, Maldonado was again involved in an incident – he was hit by team mate Romain Grosjean, who had just returned to the track after missing a braking point, causing rear wing damage to Maldonado's car. Despite the damage, Maldonado did not lose pace and was initially able to continue in seventh place; however, during his pitstop the team deemed the damage to be substantial enough to retire the car. At the Monaco Grand Prix, Maldonado was not able to profit from a season-best qualifying result of eighth due to a brake issue from the start of the race; Maldonado and Verstappen collided on the sixth lap, with Maldonado subsequently forced to retire from the race. After two seventh-place finishes in Canada and Austria, Grosjean lost control of his car causing him to crash into his team mate Maldonado on the first lap at Silverstone, causing both Lotus cars to retire. At the Hungarian Grand Prix, Sérgio Pérez tried to overtake Maldonado at the outside of the corner, Maldonado failed to leave enough room so the two collided, causing Pérez to spin. Maldonado was later penalised for his role in the incident. Maldonado was among numerous others that were penalised for speeding in the pit lane, and overtaking a Manor car under neutralised safety car conditions. Although the Manor (being lapped) let Maldonado deliberately pass him by the penalty was not withdrawn. At the midpoint of the season, the BBC journalist Andrew Benson rated Maldonado as the worst driver to that point, and stated that he "seems to be trying his utmost to find new ways to infuriate his employers and collect as many penalty points from the stewards as possible."

Following the mid-season break during first practice at Spa, Maldonado crashed the car into the barriers. It was reported that the incident justified Lotus's decision to save their sole example of a new front-wing design they had brought to this race for his team-mate Romain Grosjean. On the second lap of the race, Maldonado was in seventh but ran off track and hit a curb, sending a 17G shock through the car, which broke a clutch control valve, forcing him to retire. Despite the incident, Maldonado was ambivalent saying "I don't care" about the damage he had caused to his car. At the next race, Monza, Maldonado tried to avoid the chaos in the first chicane but hit Hülkenberg damaging the suspension, forcing Maldonado to retire. Following this incident Mark Webber said that he does not think that Maldonado is talented enough to justify his drive in F1.

At the Singapore Grand Prix, Maldonado ran off track, and when he rejoined he and Button collided. The diffuser of Maldonado's car was damaged in the incident. Immediately after the incident, world champion Button took to the radio to say about Maldonado "I should have known, he's mental". Soon after the incident, Lotus confirmed that Maldonado would drive for the team in 2016. In Japan, Maldonado started from outside the top-ten, but got up to seventh immediately after the start. However, he was overtaken by Hülkenberg during the first stop, dropping him to eighth, where he remained until the end of the race. In Russia, he started in 14th position. He had made up six positions during the race to finish in eighth place, which became seventh as Räikkönen was penalised for causing an accident on the last lap. In the US Grand Prix, Maldonado started 13th, but had to take avoiding action in the first corner, which dropped him to 18th. Despite this, he managed to get back in the battle for the points, because of the high attrition in the race and two safety car periods, when he caught up the cars in front of him. In the end, he finished eighth. At the Brazilian Grand Prix, Maldonado ran into the side of Ericsson. Maldonado's Lotus team described the incident as an "oops", but the stewards considered the incident to be serious so imposed a five-second penalty on Maldonado. Despite the penalty, he managed to finish in the points. At the Abu Dhabi Grand Prix Maldonado and Alonso collided, damaging Maldonado's car and forcing him to retire. Maldonado ended the season with 27 points and 14th place in the Drivers' World Championship. Commentators looked back at his career fondly while commenting on the inconsistency that had earned him the nickname "Crashtor".

Maldonado was originally due to continue with Lotus for 2016, however, the team was bought by Renault, and Maldonado's contract was terminated following several problems with Maldonado's sponsor, PDVSA. He was replaced by former McLaren driver Kevin Magnussen.

==== Pirelli test driver (2017) ====
Maldonado became a test driver for Pirelli, testing a GP2 car for 2017, to be able to develop the tires of the season. Maldonado had his first tests at the Mugello and Barcelona circuits.

=== Attempts to return to Formula One or enter IndyCar ===
With the announcement of the retirement of Nico Rosberg following the conclusion of the 2016 championship, Maldonado negotiated with Sauber Motorsport for a return to Formula One, with no agreement being reached.

Maldonado also negotiated with IndyCar team KV Racing Technology, with no agreement being reached, and the team being sold due to financial difficulties.

=== World Endurance Championship and 24 Hours of Daytona ===
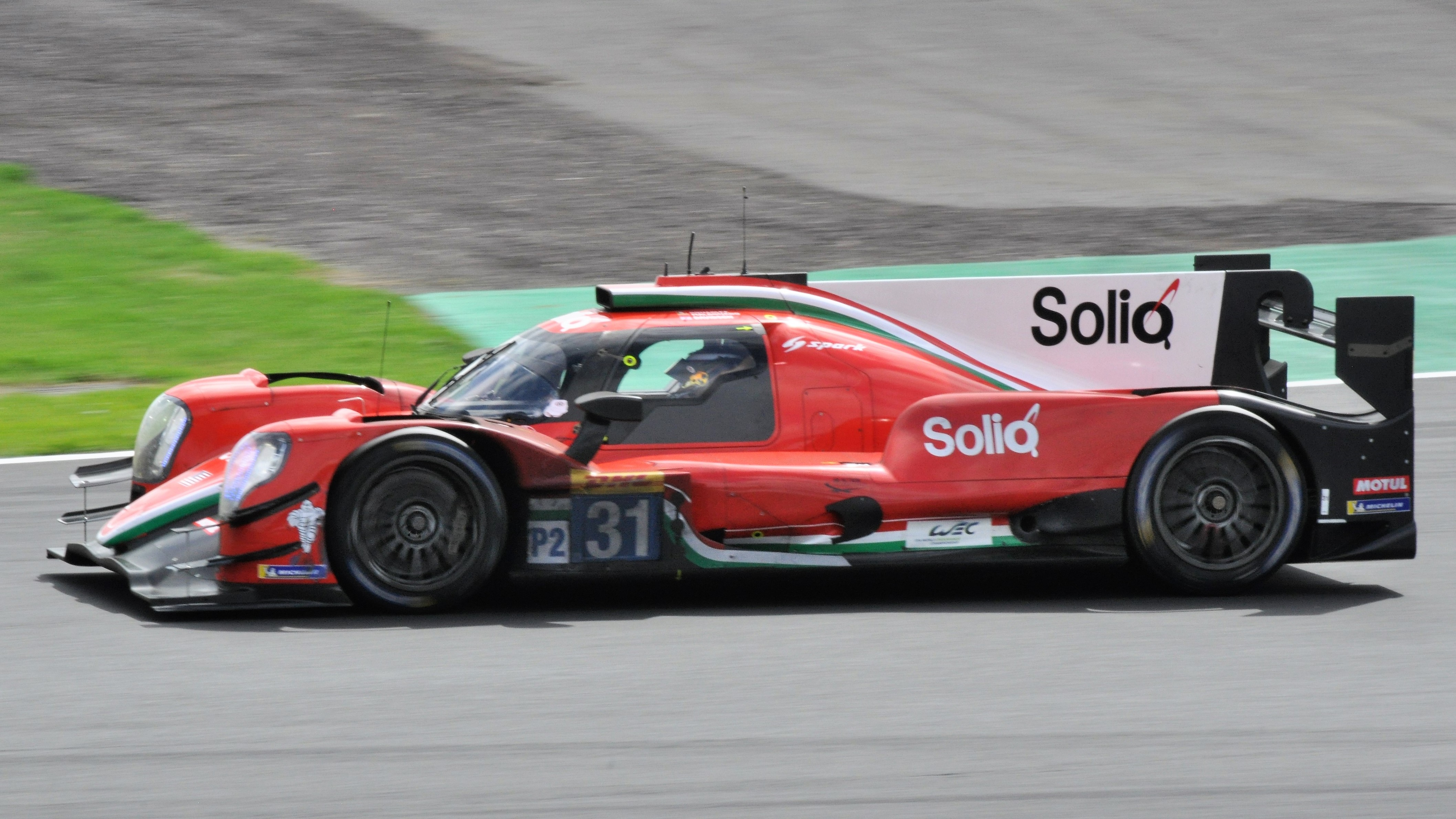
Maldonado driving in the 2018 6 Hours of Silverstone.

==== 2018–19 ====
On 21 March 2018, DragonSpeed confirmed that Maldonado would contest the entire "superseason" of the World Endurance Championship, in the LMP2 category with an Oreca 07, together with Roberto González, as well as Nathanaël Berthon in the first two rounds, and Anthony Davidson in the rest. They finished third in their category in the championship.

Maldonado also competed in the 2019 24 Hours of Daytona in the LMP2 category, also with DragonSpeed and alongside Roberto González, Sebastián Saavedra and Ryan Cullen. They finished first in their category.

== Personal life ==
Maldonado is an outspoken political figure; he considers himself a socialist and was a friend of the late Venezuelan president Hugo Chávez. He was one of the guards of honour at Chávez's funeral.

Maldonado married Venezuelan journalist Gabriela Tarkanyi on 15 December 2012, in Canaima, Venezuela. They have two daughters born in September 2013 and November 2017.

== Racing record ==
=== Career summary ===
Season	Series	Team	Races	Wins	Poles	F/Laps	Podiums	Points	Position
2003	Formula Renault 2.0 Italy	Cram Competition	12	0	1	1	3	118	7th
2003	Formula Renault 2000 Masters	Cram Competition	8	0	0	0	0	0	28th
2003	Formula Renault 2.0 Germany	Cram Competition	2	0	0	0	0	3	43rd
2003	Formula Renault 2.0 Italy Winter Cup	Cram Competition	?	?	?	?	?	?	**1st**
2004	Formula Renault 2.0 Italy	Cram Competition	17	8	6	11	12	326	**1st**
2004	Formula Renault 2000 Eurocup	Cram Competition	15	2	0	1	3	134	8th
2004	Formula Renault V6 Eurocup	Cram Competition	2	0	0	0	0	12	21st
2004	Formula One	Minardi F1 Team	Test driver						
2005	Formula Renault 3.5 Series	DAMS	8	0	0	0	0	4	25th
2005	Italian Formula 3000	Sighinolfi Auto Racing	4	1	1	1	1	14	9th
2006	Formula Renault 3.5 Series	Draco Racing	17	3	5	6	5	103	**3rd**
2007	GP2 Series	Trident Racing	13	1	1	0	2	25	11th
2007	Euroseries 3000	G-Tec	2	1	1	1	1	12	10th
2007	Formula 3000 Italy	G-Tec	2	1	1	1	1	12	8th
2008	GP2 Series	Piquet Sports	20	1	2	4	6	60	5th
2008	International GT Open – GTS	Scuderia Latorre	2	0	0	0	1	8	22nd
2008	Euroseries 3000	GP Racing	1	1	0	1	1	11	12th
2008	International GT Open	Scuderia Latorre	?	?	?	?	?	18	32nd
2008–09	GP2 Asia Series	ART Grand Prix	5	0	0	0	1	7	15th
2009	GP2 Series	ART Grand Prix	20	2	0	1	2	36	6th
2009	Euroseries 3000	Teamcraft Motorsport	2	1	0	0	1	10	10th
2010	GP2 Series	Rapax Team	20	6	0	5	8	87	**1st**
2010	Formula One	Hispania Racing F1 Team	Test driver						
2011	Formula One	AT&T Williams	19	0	0	0	0	1	18th
2012	Formula One	Williams F1 Team	20	1	1	0	1	45	15th
2013	Formula One	Williams F1 Team	19	0	0	0	0	1	18th
2014	Formula One	Lotus F1 Team	19	0	0	0	0	2	16th
2015	Formula One	Lotus F1 Team	19	0	0	0	0	27	14th
2016	Formula One	Pirelli	Test driver						
2017	Formula One	Pirelli	Test driver						
2018	24 Hours of Le Mans - LMP2	DragonSpeed	1	0	0	0	0	N/A	5th
2018–19	FIA World Endurance Championship - LMP2	DragonSpeed	8	1	2	1	4	117	**3rd**
2019	IMSA SportsCar Championship - LMP2	DragonSpeed	1	1	0	0	1	35	8th
2019	24 Hours of Le Mans - LMP2	DragonSpeed	1	0	0	0	0	N/A	DNF

=== Complete Formula Renault 2.0 Italia results ===
(key) (Races in bold indicate pole position; races in italics indicate fastest lap)

Year	Entrant	1	2	3	4	5	6	7	8	9	10	11	12	13	14	15	16	17	DC	Points
2003	Cram Competition	VLL; 7	VLL; 2	MGI; 14	SPA; 5	SPA; 3	A1R; 3	A1R; 18	MIS; Ret	MIS; 7	VAR; 9	ADR; 4	**MNZ**; 9						7th	118
2004	Cram Competition	VLL; 1; 2	VLL; 2; 1	VAR; 2	MGI; 4	**SPA**; **1**; 1	**SPA**; **2**; 1	**MNZ1**; **1** Ret	MNZ1; 2; 6	MNZ1; 3; 3	MIS; 1; 10	MIS; 2; 3	MIS; 3 Ret	**ADR**; 1	HOC; 1; 1	**HOC**; **2**; 1	MNZ2; 1; 1	**MNZ2**; **2**; 1	1st	362

=== Complete Formula Renault 2.0 Eurocup results ===
(key) (Races in bold indicate pole position; races in italics indicate fastest lap)

Year	Entrant	1	2	3	4	5	6	7	8	9	10	11	12	13	14	15	16	17	DC	Points
2003	Cram Competition	BRN; 1 Ret	BRN; 2; 16	ASS; 1; 9	ASS; 2 Ret	OSC; 1 Ret	OSC; 2; 29	DON; 1; 11	DON; 2 Ret										28th	0
2004	Cram Competition	MNZ; 1; 1	MNZ; 2; 1	VAL; 1; 2	VAL; 2; 7	MAG; 1 Ret	MAG; 2; 7	HOC; 1; 15	HOC; 2 Ret	BRN; 1; 7	BRN; 2; 7	DON; 1	DON; 2	SPA; Ret	IMO; 1; 8	IMO; 2 Ret	OSC; 1 Ret	OSC; 2; 8	8th	132

=== Complete Formula Renault 3.5 Series results ===
(key) (Races in bold indicate pole position; races in italics indicate fastest lap)

Year	Entrant	1	2	3	4	5	6	7	8	9	10	11	12	13	14	15	16	17	DC	Points
2005	DAMS	ZOL; 1; 20	ZOL; 2 Ret	MON; 1 DNS	VAL; 1	VAL; 2	LMS; 1	LMS; 2	BIL; 1	BIL; 2	OSC; 1	OSC; 2	DON; 1; 25	DON; 2; 7	EST; 1; 12	EST; 2 Ret	MNZ; 1 Ret	MNZ; 2 Ret	25th	4
2006	Draco Racing	ZOL; 1; 8	ZOL; 2; 3	MON; 1; 1	IST; 1; 11	**IST**; **2** Ret	**MIS**; **1** DSQ	MIS; 2 Ret	**SPA**; **1**; 1	**SPA**; **2**; 2	NUR; 1; 6	**NUR**; **2**; 22	DON; 1; 8	DON; 2 Ret	LMS; 1 Ret	LMS; 2; 1	CAT; 1; 10	CAT; 2; 2	3rd	102

=== Complete Italian Formula 3000 results ===
(key) (Races in bold indicate pole position; races in italics indicate fastest lap)

Year	Entrant	1	2	3	4	5	6	7	8	DC	Points
2005	Sighinolfi Auto Racing	ADR	VAL	BRN; Ret	IMO; Ret	MUG; 7	**MGI**; 1	MNZ	MIS	9th	14
2007	G-Tec	VLL; 1	VLL; 2	**HUN**; **1**; 1	HUN; 2 Ret	MUG; 1	MUG; 2	MNZ; 1	MNZ; 2	8th	12

=== Complete Euroseries 3000 results ===
(key) (Races in bold indicate pole position; races in italics indicate fastest lap)

Year	Entrant	1	2	3	4	5	6	7	8	9	10	11	12	13	14	15	16	DC	Points
2007	G-Tec	VLL; 1	VLL; 2	**HUN**; **1**; 1	HUN; 2 Ret	MAG; 1	MAG; 2	MUG; 1	MUG; 2	NUR; 1	NUR; 2	SPA; 1	SPA; 2	MNZ; 1	MNZ; 2	CAT; 1	CAT; 2	11th	12
2008	GP Racing	VLL; 1	VLL; 2	SPA; 1; 1	SPA; 2 C	VAL; 1	VAL; 2	MUG; 1	MUG; 2	MIS; 1	MIS; 2	JER; 1	JER; 2	CAT; 1	CAT; 2	MGI; 1	MGI; 2	12th	11
2009	Teamcraft Motorsport	ALG; 1; 1	ALG; 2; 10	MAG; 1	MAG; 2	DON; 1	DON; 2	ZOL; 1	ZOL; 2	VAL; 1	VAL; 2	VAL; 3	VLL; 1	VLL; 2	MNZ; 1	MNZ; 2		10th	10

=== Complete GP2 Series results ===
(key) (Races in bold indicate pole position; races in italics indicate fastest lap)

Year	Entrant	1	2	3	4	5	6	7	8	9	10	11	12	13	14	15	16	17	18	19	20	21	DC	Points
2007	Trident Racing	BHR; FEA; DNS	BHR; SPR; 16†	CAT; FEA; Ret	CAT; SPR; 17†	**MON**; **FEA**; 1	MAG; FEA; 10	MAG; SPR; 8	SIL; FEA; 7	SIL; SPR; 2	NÜR; FEA; 6	NÜR; SPR; 4	HUN; FEA; Ret	HUN; SPR; Ret	IST; FEA	IST; SPR	MNZ; FEA	MNZ; SPR	SPA; FEA	SPA; SPR	VAL; FEA	VAL; SPR	11th	25
2008	Piquet Sports	**CAT**; **FEA**; 12	CAT; SPR; Ret	IST; FEA; Ret	IST; SPR; Ret	**MON**; **FEA**; 2	MON; SPR; Ret	MAG; FEA; 3	MAG; SPR; 7	SIL; FEA; Ret	SIL; SPR; 15†	HOC; FEA; 6	HOC; SPR; 17	HUN; FEA; 5	HUN; SPR; 18†	VAL; FEA; 2	VAL; SPR; Ret	SPA; FEA; 3	SPA; SPR; 1	MNZ; FEA; 2	MNZ; SPR; 4		5th	60
2009	ART Grand Prix	CAT; FEA; 5	CAT; SPR; 6	MON; FEA; 8	MON; SPR; 1	IST; FEA; 6	IST; SPR; 5	SIL; FEA; 7	SIL; SPR; 1	NÜR; FEA; Ret	NÜR; SPR; 9	HUN; FEA; 4	HUN; SPR; Ret	VAL; FEA; DSQ	VAL; SPR; 8	SPA; FEA; 4	SPA; SPR; Ret	MNZ; FEA; Ret	MNZ; SPR; 15†	ALG; FEA; 11	ALG; SPR; 20		6th	36
2010	Rapax	CAT; FEA; 6	CAT; SPR; 3	MON; FEA; 2	MON; SPR; 11	IST; FEA; 1	IST; SPR; 6	VAL; FEA; 1	VAL; SPR; 4	SIL; FEA; 1	SIL; SPR; 4	HOC; FEA; 1	HOC; SPR; 20†	HUN; FEA; 1	HUN; SPR; DSQ	SPA; FEA; 1	SPA; SPR; Ret	MNZ; FEA; Ret	MNZ; SPR; Ret	YMC; FEA; 17	YMC; SPR; 9		1st	87

=== Complete GP2 Asia Series results ===
(key) (Races in bold indicate pole position; races in italics indicate fastest lap)

Year	Entrant	1	2	3	4	5	6	7	8	9	10	11	12	DC	Points
2008–09	ART Grand Prix	SHI; FEA	SHI; SPR	DUB; FEA; Ret	DUB; SPR; C	BHR1; FEA	BHR1; SPR	LSL; FEA	LSL; SPR	SEP; FEA; 7	SEP; SPR; 2	BHR2; FEA; Ret	BHR2; SPR; Ret	15th	7

=== Complete Formula One results ===
(key) (Races in bold indicate pole position; races in italics indicate fastest lap)

Year	Entrant	Chassis	Engine	1	2	3	4	5	6	7	8	9	10	11	12	13	14	15	16	17	18	19	20	WDC	Points
2011	AT&T Williams	Williams FW33	Cosworth CA2011 2.4 V8	AUS; Ret	MAL; Ret	CHN; 18	TUR; 17	ESP; 15	MON; 18^{†}	CAN; Ret	EUR; 18	GBR; 14	GER; 14	HUN; 16	BEL; 10	ITA; 11	SIN; 11	JPN; 14	KOR; Ret	IND; Ret	ABU; 14	BRA; Ret		19th	1
2012	Williams F1 Team	Williams FW34	Renault RS27-2012 V8	AUS; 13^{†}	MAL; 19^{†}	CHN; 8	BHR; Ret	**ESP**; 1	MON; Ret	CAN; 13	EUR; 12	GBR; 16	GER; 15	HUN; 13	BEL; Ret	ITA; 11	SIN; Ret	JPN; 8	KOR; 14	IND; 16	ABU; 5	USA; 9	BRA; Ret	15th	45
2013	Williams F1 Team	Williams FW35	Renault RS27-2013 V8	AUS; Ret	MAL; Ret	CHN; 14	BHR; 11	ESP; 14	MON; Ret	CAN; 16	GBR; 11	GER; 15	HUN; 10	BEL; 17	ITA; 14	SIN; 11	KOR; 13	JPN; 16	IND; 12	ABU; 11	USA; 17	BRA; 16		18th	1
2014	Lotus F1 Team	Lotus E22	Renault Energy F1-2014 1.6 V6 t	AUS; Ret	MAL; Ret	BHR; 14	CHN; 14	ESP; 15	MON; DNS	CAN; Ret	AUT; 12	GBR; 17^{†}	GER; 12	HUN; 13	BEL; Ret	ITA; 14	SIN; 12	JPN; 16	RUS; 18	USA; 9	BRA; 12	ABU; Ret		16th	2
2015	Lotus F1 Team	Lotus E23 Hybrid	Mercedes PU106B Hybrid 1.6 V6 t	AUS; Ret	MAL; Ret	CHN; Ret	BHR; 15	ESP; Ret	MON; Ret	CAN; 7	AUT; 7	GBR; Ret	HUN; 14	BEL; Ret	ITA; Ret	SIN; 12	JPN; 8	RUS; 7	USA; 8	MEX; 11	BRA; 10	ABU; Ret		14th	27

^{†} Did not finish, but was classified as he had completed more than 90% of the race distance.

=== Complete FIA World Endurance Championship results ===
(key) (Races in bold indicate pole position; races in italics indicate fastest lap)

Year	Entrant	Class	Chassis	Engine	1	2	3	4	5	6	7	8	Rank	Points
2018–19	DragonSpeed	LMP2	Oreca 07	Gibson GK428 4.2 L V8	SPA; 5	**LMS**; 3	SIL; 4	**FUJ**; 6	SHA; 2	SEB; 3	SPA; 1	LMS; Ret	3rd	117

=== 24 Hours of Le Mans results ===
Year	Team	Co-Drivers	Car	Class	Laps	Pos.	Class Pos.
2018	(United States) DragonSpeed	(Mexico) Roberto González (France) Nathanaël Berthon	Oreca 07-Gibson	LMP2	360	9th	5th
2019	(United States) DragonSpeed	(Mexico) Roberto González (United Kingdom) Anthony Davidson	Oreca 07-Gibson	LMP2	245	DNF	DNF

=== Complete IMSA SportsCar Championship results ===
(key) (Races in bold indicate pole position; races in italics indicate fastest lap)

Year	Entrant	Class	Make	Engine	1	2	3	4	5	6	7	8	Rank	Points
2019	DragonSpeed	LMP2	Oreca 07	Gibson GK428 4.2 L V8	DAY; 1	SEB	MDO	WGL	MOS	ELK	LGA	PET	8th	35

== See also ==
- Formula One drivers from Venezuela

Awards and achievements
Sporting positions
Preceded by Toni Vilander	Italian Formula Renault 2.0; Winter Series Champion; 2003	Succeeded by Mikhail Aleshin
Preceded by Franck Perera	Italian Formula Renault Championship; Champion; 2004	Succeeded by Kamui Kobayashi
Preceded by Nico Hülkenberg	GP2 Series; Champion; 2010	Succeeded by Romain Grosjean
