= 2011 Abu Dhabi Grand Prix =

Race 18 of 19 in the 2011 Formula One World Championship
← Previous race	Next race →

Race details
- Date: 13 November 2011
- Official name: 2011 Formula 1 Etihad Airways Abu Dhabi Grand Prix
- Location: Yas Island, Abu Dhabi, United Arab Emirates
- Course: Yas Marina Circuit
- Course length: 5.554 km (3.451 miles)
- Distance: 55 laps, 305.470 km (189.810 miles)
- Weather: Fine and Dry Air Temp 25 °C (77 °F)

Pole position
Driver	(Germany) Sebastian Vettel	Red Bull Racing-Renault
- Time: 1:38.481

Fastest lap
Driver	(Australia) Mark Webber	Red Bull Racing-Renault
- Time: 1:42.612 on lap 51

Podium
First	(United Kingdom) Lewis Hamilton	McLaren-Mercedes
Second	(Spain) Fernando Alonso	Ferrari
Third	(United Kingdom) Jenson Button	McLaren-Mercedes

The 2011 Abu Dhabi Grand Prix (formally the 2011 Formula 1 Etihad Airways Abu Dhabi Grand Prix) was the eighteenth and penultimate round of the 2011 Formula One season. It was held on 13 November 2011 at the Yas Marina Circuit on Yas Island, a man-made island on the outskirts of Abu Dhabi in the United Arab Emirates. It was the third running of the Abu Dhabi Grand Prix. As is customary with the race, it was the only twilight Grand Prix of the 2011 Formula One season, with a start time of 17:00 local time.

The race was won by McLaren's Lewis Hamilton. Second was Ferrari's Fernando Alonso, with Jenson Button coming third in the other McLaren.

Sebastian Vettel, having won both of the previous iterations of the race for Red Bull Racing-Renault, had been in pole position, but retired after a puncture in the first lap, near the second corner, which was his first retirement since the 2010 Korean Grand Prix, where he encountered a problem with his engine. As a result, this prevented him from equalling Michael Schumacher's record of 13 wins in one season, but Vettel did equal Nigel Mansell's 1992 record of 14 pole positions in one season. This was also the only race of 2011 in which neither Red Bull finished on the podium, as Vettel's teammate Mark Webber finished fourth.

== Report ==
=== Background ===
Vitantonio Liuzzi returned to Hispania for the race, having been replaced by Narain Karthikeyan for the Indian Grand Prix to make way for him to drive in front of his home crowd.

Williams driver Pastor Maldonado took a ten-place grid penalty for exceeding his engine quota for the season. Drivers are entitled to use up to eight engines over the course of the season without penalty, but Maldonado's eighth and final engine was damaged beyond repair when he retired from the Indian Grand Prix.

In the week before the race, it was announced that the teams would trial several new compounds of tyre rubber in Friday practice, to offer tyre supplier Pirelli more feedback on their planned 2012 tyre compounds. Tyre supplier Pirelli brought its white-banded medium compound tyre as the harder "prime" tyre and the yellow-banded soft compound as the softer "option" compound, as opposed to the previous year where Bridgestone brought the red-banded super-soft compound as the option.

Formula Renault 3.5 Series champion Robert Wickens and runner-up Jean-Éric Vergne drove during free practice; Vergne drove for Toro Rosso, while Wickens drove for Virgin in place of Jérôme d'Ambrosio. GP2 Series champion Romain Grosjean also drove during free practice, for Renault.

The circuit included two DRS zones, each with their own independent detection points. The first detection point was located just before the Turn 7 hairpin, with its corresponding activation point positioned halfway down the long back straight; the second detection point was set after the exit of Turn 9, with its activation point adjacent to the secondary pit lane at Turn 10.

The drivers' representative on the stewards panel for the Grand Prix weekend was Derek Warwick.

=== Free practice ===
The first practice session saw Jenson Button set the fastest lap time, one tenth of a second ahead of Mark Webber and Lewis Hamilton. Hamilton had set the early pace, using Pirelli's experimental development tyres, but Webber and Sebastian Vettel surpassed him, and Button set his fastest lap time as the session drew to a close. Ferrari drivers Fernando Alonso and Felipe Massa experienced several off-track excursions between them. Romain Grosjean set a faster lap time than teammate Vitaly Petrov, though Petrov was forced to abandon his car during his final run with engine troubles. Rubens Barrichello was also forced out with technical problems, failing to set a lap time.

The second session was known for two separate incidents at Turn 1; Vettel spun and became stuck in the outside barrier early in the session, while Alonso crashed at the same place. Hamilton went on to set the fastest time, two-tenths faster than Button's fastest time in the first session.

=== Qualifying ===
Qualifying began with dusk approaching in Abu Dhabi, with Vettel looking to equal Nigel Mansell's record of 14 poles in a season. In the first session Rubens Barrichello had an oil leak, therefore unable to set a lap time, but was allowed to race. He joined the Lotuses, HRTs and Virgins in failing to make it to the second part of qualifying. In the second qualifying session, which took place as the sun went down, there was a red flag mid way, due to a loose bollard, which Massa drove over but escaped without damage. When the bollard was removed the session resumed. Sauber, Renault, Toro Rosso, and the remaining Williams car of Pastor Maldonado were all knocked out. Pastor Maldonado had been given a 10 place grid penalty for a ninth engine, so started in 23rd, just in front of his teammate on the back row of the grid. Hamilton led most of the final qualifying session, only to be beaten to pole position by Vettel, on Vettel's last lap. The order then followed with Button in 3rd, Webber 4th, then Alonso, Massa, Rosberg, Schumacher, Sutil, and di Resta, having not set a time in order to save tyres for the race.

=== Race ===
Vettel led into the first corner, but an unexplained puncture on his right rear tyre caused him to spin off the track at Turn 2 and suffer his first retirement of the season. Hamilton led the race afterwards, and won the race mostly untroubled. Alonso finished second after he overtook Button on lap 1, Button eventually finished third. Webber dropped to behind Alonso at the start, but remained fourth after Vettel's retirement. He battled with Button throughout the race, but to no avail, eventually finishing fourth. He was followed by Felipe Massa, the two Mercedes, the two Force Indias, and the two Saubers - with Kobayashi taking the final point and Pérez missing out in eleventh. Jérôme d'Ambrosio, Sébastien Buemi and Daniel Ricciardo were the other retirements of the race.

== Classification ==
=== Qualifying ===
Pos	No	Driver	Constructor	Part 1	Part 2	Part 3	Grid
1	1	(Germany) Sebastian Vettel	Red Bull Racing-Renault	1:40.478	1:38.516	1:38.481	1
2	3	(United Kingdom) Lewis Hamilton	McLaren-Mercedes	1:39.782	1:38.434	1:38.622	2
3	4	(United Kingdom) Jenson Button	McLaren-Mercedes	1:40.227	1:39.097	1:38.631	3
4	2	(Australia) Mark Webber	Red Bull Racing-Renault	1:40.167	1:38.821	1:38.858	4
5	5	(Spain) Fernando Alonso	Ferrari	1:41.380	1:39.058	1:39.058	5
6	6	(Brazil) Felipe Massa	Ferrari	1:41.592	1:39.623	1:39.695	6
7	8	(Germany) Nico Rosberg	Mercedes	1:41.120	1:39.420	1:39.773	7
8	7	(Germany) Michael Schumacher	Mercedes	1:42.605	1:40.554	1:40.662	8
9	14	(Germany) Adrian Sutil	Force India-Mercedes	1:40.595	1:40.205	1:40.768	9
10	15	(United Kingdom) Paul di Resta	Force India-Mercedes	1:41.064	1:40.414	no time	10
11	17	(Mexico) Sergio Pérez	Sauber-Ferrari	1:41.311	1:40.874		11
12	10	(Russia) Vitaly Petrov	Renault	1:40.955	1:40.919		12
13	18	(Switzerland) Sébastien Buemi	Toro Rosso-Ferrari	1:41.737	1:41.009		13
14	9	(Brazil) Bruno Senna	Renault	1:41.391	1:41.079		14
15	19	(Spain) Jaime Alguersuari	Toro Rosso-Ferrari	1:41.386	1:41.162		15
16	16	(Japan) Kamui Kobayashi	Sauber-Ferrari	1:41.613	1:41.240		16
17	12	(Venezuela) Pastor Maldonado	Williams-Cosworth	1:42.258	1:41.760		23^{1}
18	20	(Finland) Heikki Kovalainen	Lotus-Renault	1:42.979			17
19	21	(Italy) Jarno Trulli	Lotus-Renault	1:43.884			18
20	24	(Germany) Timo Glock	Virgin-Cosworth	1:44.515			19
21	22	(Australia) Daniel Ricciardo	HRT-Cosworth	1:44.641			20
22	25	(Belgium) Jérôme d'Ambrosio	Virgin-Cosworth	1:44.699			21
23	23	(Italy) Vitantonio Liuzzi	HRT-Cosworth	1:45.159			22
107% time: 1:46.766
24	11	(Brazil) Rubens Barrichello	Williams-Cosworth	no time			24^{2}

Notes
^1 – Pastor Maldonado was given a ten-place grid penalty for using his ninth engine of the season, exceeding the limit of eight engines.
^2 – Rubens Barrichello failed to set a lap time after his team discovered an oil leak following an engine change. As he had set practice times within 107% of the fastest driver's time, he was given permission to start the race.

=== Race ===
Pos	No	Driver	Constructor	Laps	Time/Retired	Grid	Points
1	3	(United Kingdom) Lewis Hamilton	McLaren-Mercedes	55	1:37:11.886	2	25
2	5	(Spain) Fernando Alonso	Ferrari	55	+8.457	5	18
3	4	(United Kingdom) Jenson Button	McLaren-Mercedes	55	+25.871	3	15
4	2	(Australia) Mark Webber	Red Bull Racing-Renault	55	+35.784	4	12
5	6	(Brazil) Felipe Massa	Ferrari	55	+50.578	6	10
6	8	(Germany) Nico Rosberg	Mercedes	55	+52.317	7	8
7	7	(Germany) Michael Schumacher	Mercedes	55	+1:15.964	8	6
8	14	(Germany) Adrian Sutil	Force India-Mercedes	55	+1:17.122	9	4
9	15	(United Kingdom) Paul di Resta	Force India-Mercedes	55	+1:41.087	10	2
10	16	(Japan) Kamui Kobayashi	Sauber-Ferrari	54	+1 Lap	16	1
11	17	(Mexico) Sergio Pérez	Sauber-Ferrari	54	+1 Lap	11	
12	11	(Brazil) Rubens Barrichello	Williams-Cosworth	54	+1 Lap	24	
13	10	(Russia) Vitaly Petrov	Renault	54	+1 Lap	12	
14	12	(Venezuela) Pastor Maldonado	Williams-Cosworth	54	+1 Lap^{3}	23	
15	19	(Spain) Jaime Alguersuari	Toro Rosso-Ferrari	54	+1 Lap^{3}	15	
16	9	(Brazil) Bruno Senna	Renault	54	+1 Lap	14	
17	20	(Finland) Heikki Kovalainen	Lotus-Renault	54	+1 Lap	17	
18	21	(Italy) Jarno Trulli	Lotus-Renault	53	+2 Laps	18	
19	24	(Germany) Timo Glock	Virgin-Cosworth	53	+2 Laps	19	
20	23	(Italy) Vitantonio Liuzzi	HRT-Cosworth	53	+2 Laps	22	
Ret	22	(Australia) Daniel Ricciardo	HRT-Cosworth	47	Alternator	20	
Ret	18	(Switzerland) Sébastien Buemi	Toro Rosso-Ferrari	18	Hydraulics	13	
Ret	25	(Belgium) Jérôme d'Ambrosio	Virgin-Cosworth	17	Brakes	21	
Ret	1	(Germany) Sebastian Vettel	Red Bull Racing-Renault	1	Puncture damage	1	

Notes
^3 – Pastor Maldonado (30 seconds) and Jaime Alguersuari (20 seconds) were given time penalties for ignoring blue flags, but did not alter their respective finishing positions.

== Championship standings after the race ==
Drivers' Championship standings

Pos.	Driver	Points
1	(Germany) **Sebastian Vettel**	374
2	(United Kingdom) Jenson Button	255
3	(Spain) Fernando Alonso	245
4	(Australia) Mark Webber	233
5	(United Kingdom) Lewis Hamilton	227

Constructors' Championship standings

Pos.	Constructor	Points
1	(Austria) **Red Bull Racing-Renault**	607
2	(United Kingdom) McLaren-Mercedes	482
3	(Italy) Ferrari	353
4	(Germany) Mercedes	159
5	(United Kingdom) Renault	72

- Note: Only the top five positions are included for both sets of standings.
- **Bold text** indicates the 2011 World Champions.

== See also ==
- 2011 GP2 Final

Previous race: 2011 Indian Grand Prix	FIA Formula One World Championship; 2011 season	Next race: 2011 Brazilian Grand Prix
Previous race: 2010 Abu Dhabi Grand Prix	Abu Dhabi Grand Prix	Next race: 2012 Abu Dhabi Grand Prix
