= Formula One drivers from Venezuela =

List of Formula One drivers from Venezuela

- Drivers: 3
- Grands Prix: 120
- Entries: 120
- Starts: 114
- Best season finish: 14th (2015)
- Wins: 1
- Podiums: 1
- Pole positions: 1
- Fastest laps: 0
- Points: 77
- First entry: 1960 Argentine Grand Prix
- First win: 2012 Spanish Grand Prix
- Latest win: 2012 Spanish Grand Prix
- Latest entry: 2015 Abu Dhabi Grand Prix
- 2026 drivers: None

There have been 3 Formula One drivers from Venezuela.

== Former drivers ==
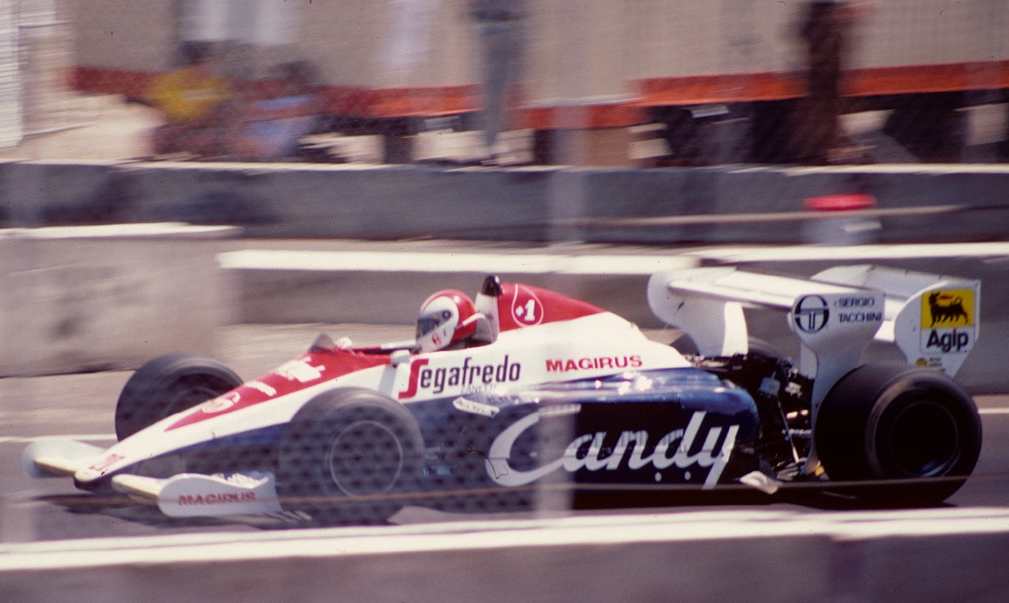
Cecotto driving for Toleman at the 1984 Dallas Grand Prix.

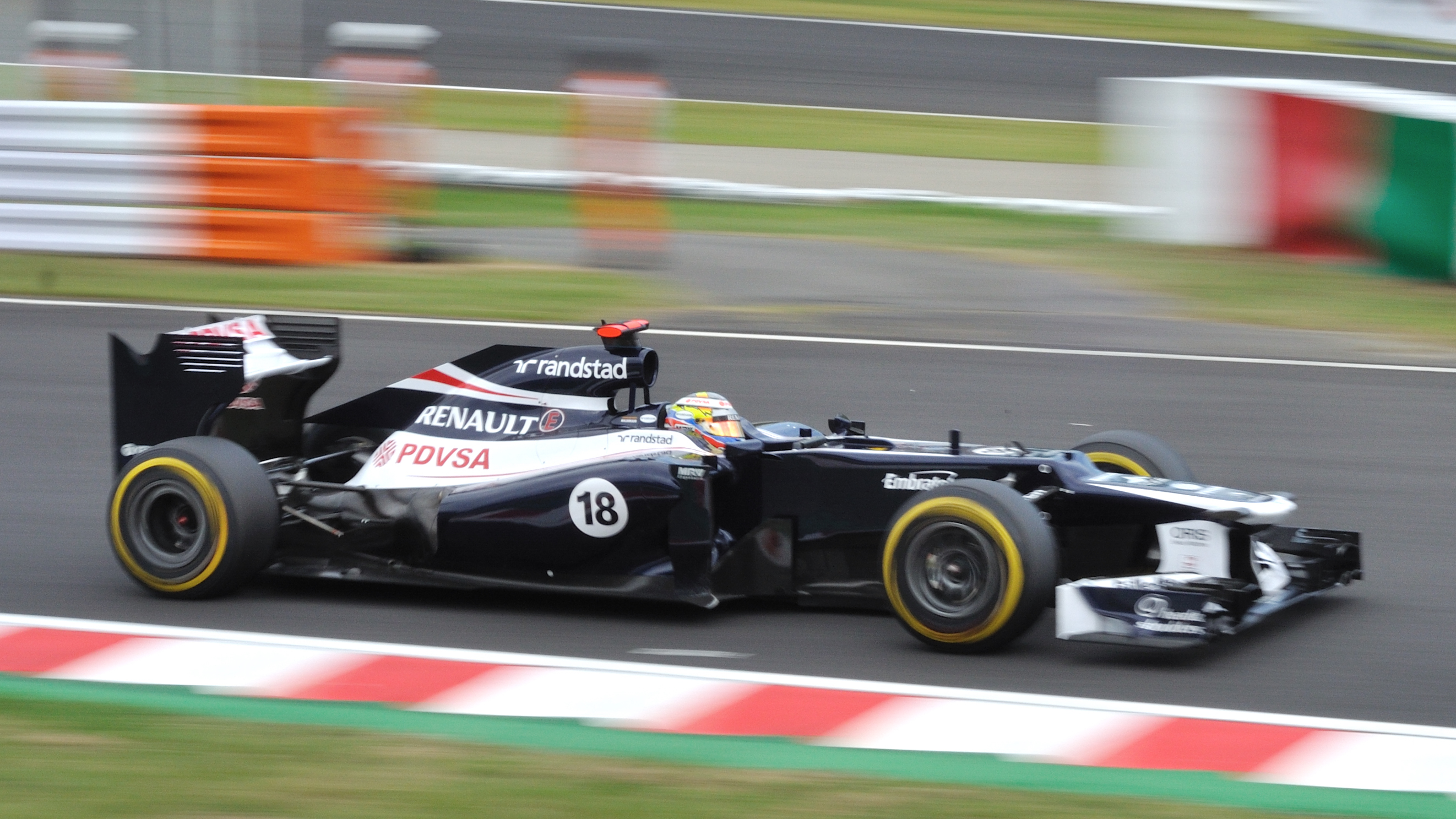
Maldonado driving for Williams at the 2012 Japanese Grand Prix.

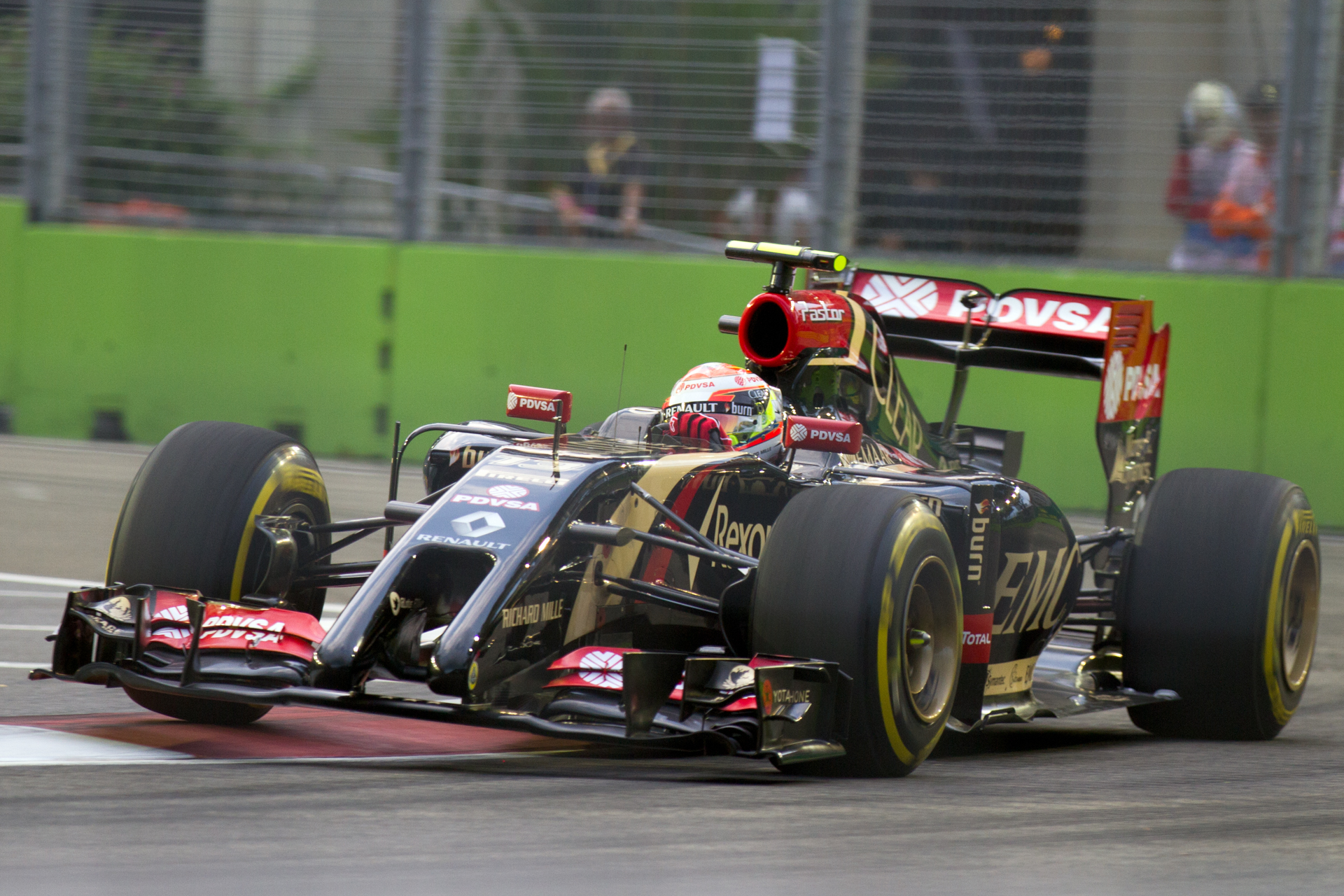
Maldonado driving for Lotus at the 2014 Singapore Grand Prix.

The first Venezuelan F1 racer was Ettore Chimeri. He raced in one Grand Prix, the 1960 Argentine Grand Prix in a Maserati 250F, but retired due to fatigue. It was supposed to be the first of many entries for Chimeri, who was killed in practice for the Gran Premio Libertad sports car race in Havana, Cuba two weeks later.

Accomplished motorcycle racer Johnny Cecotto made his debut in Formula One with Theodore Racing at the 1983 Brazilian Grand Prix. He scored his only points in the following race, however the luck didn't last as the team was forced to pull out of the sport before the penultimate race of the 1983 season. Cecotto landed a drive alongside debutant Ayrton Senna at Toleman for 1984, but was a classified finisher in only one of the ten races he participated in that season. His final appearance was the 1984 British Grand Prix.

27 years later, Pastor Maldonado made his Formula One debut for Williams at the 2011 Australian Grand Prix. He spent his first 3 seasons in Formula One with the team, and quickly became known for his overly aggressive style of racing. He raced for Lotus in 2014 and 2015, struggling with a mid-field car. Maldonado's career was heavily reliant on PDVSA backing, and when the Venezuelan economy went bust in early 2016, Renault (who had bought back Lotus in the off-season) opted out of keeping him on for the upcoming season and he was replaced by Kevin Magnussen. The highlight of his career was an unlikely pole position and win at the 2012 Spanish Grand Prix, becoming the first (and so far only) Venezuelan to take victory in a Grand Prix.

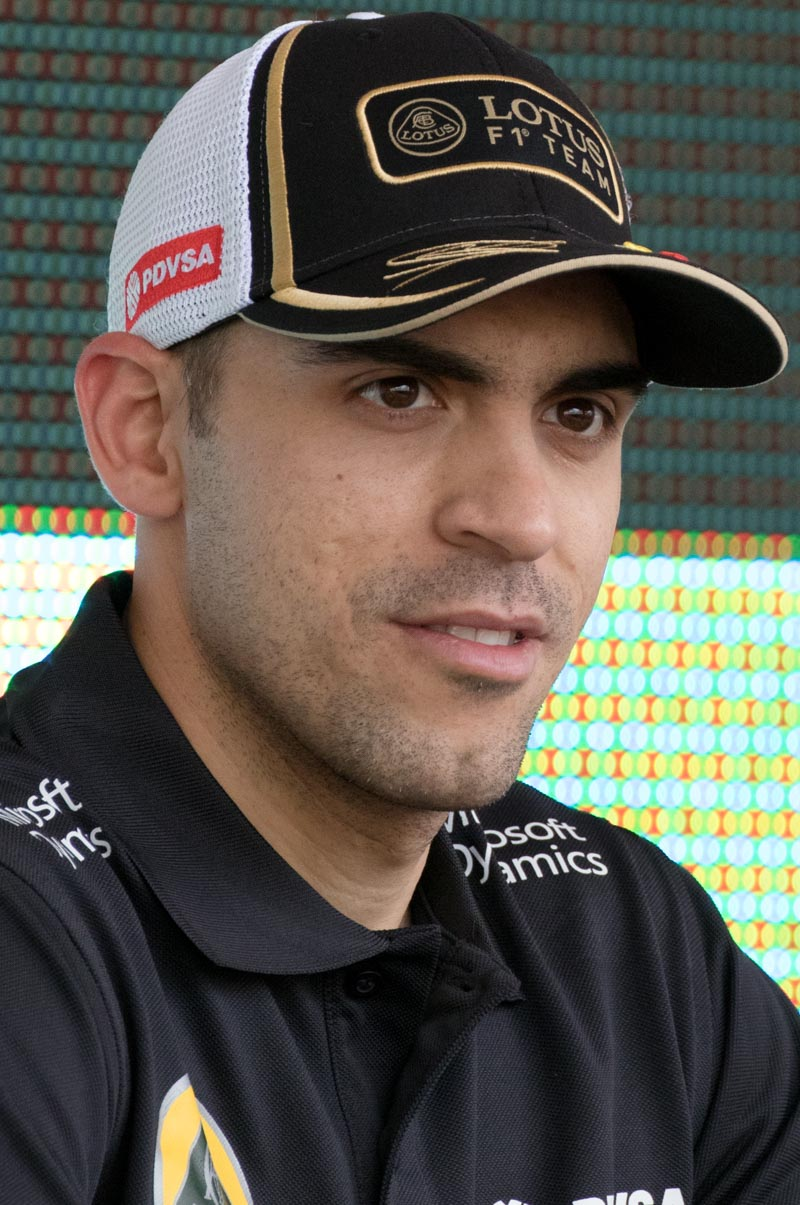
Pastor Maldonado

== Statistics ==
Drivers	Active Years	Entries	Wins	Podiums	Career Points	Poles	Fastest Laps
Ettore Chimeri	1960	1	0	0	0	0	0
Johnny Cecotto	1983–1984	23 (18 starts)	0	0	1	0	0
Pastor Maldonado	2011–2015	96 (95 starts)	1	1	76	1	0

== See also ==
- List of Formula One Grand Prix winners
