= Hispania F110 =

2010 Formula One motor racing car

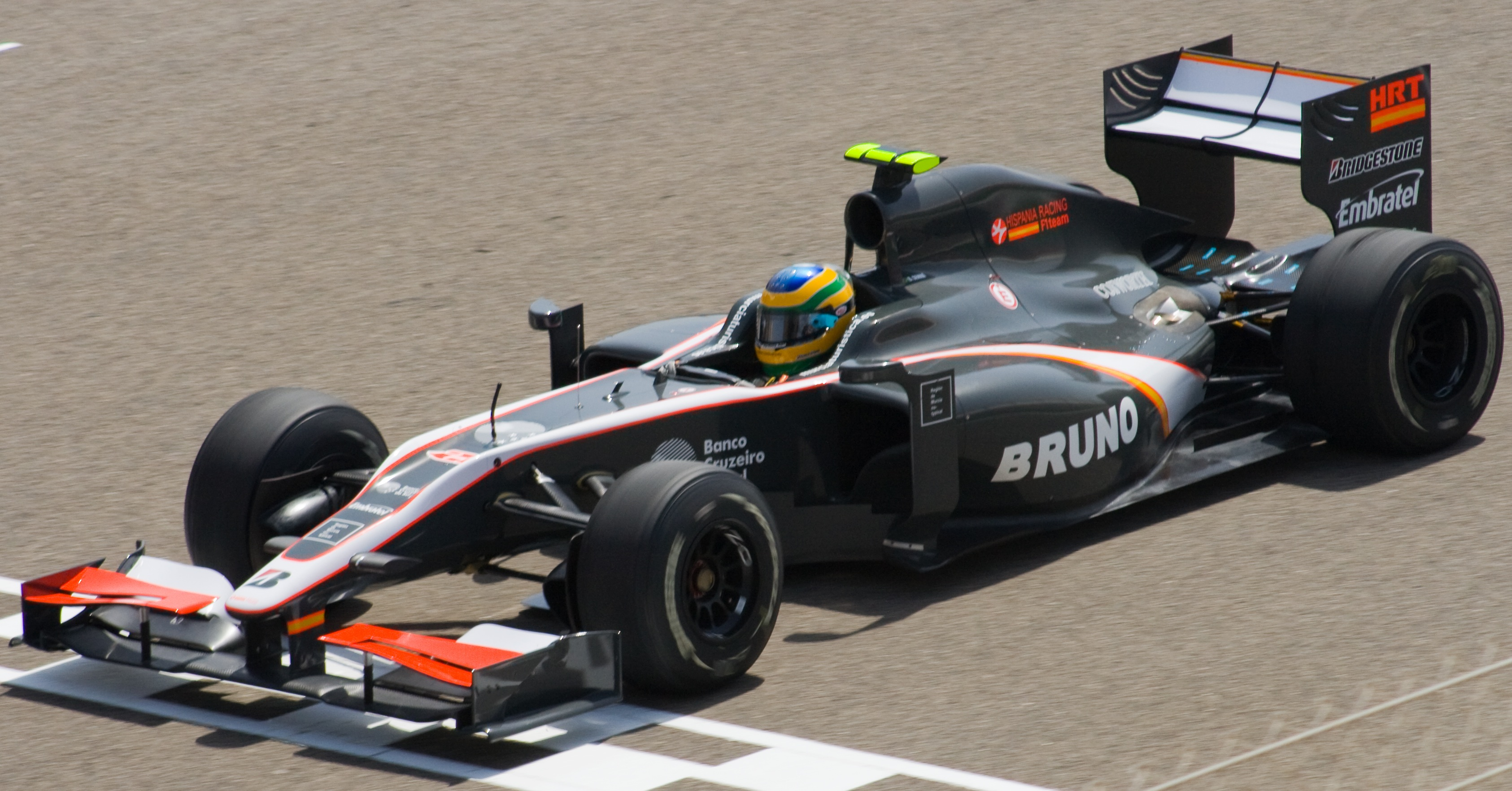
- Bruno Senna driving the F110 at the Bahrain Grand Prix
- Category: Formula One
- Constructor: Dallara
- Designers: Luca Pignacca (Technical Director); Ben Agathangelou (Chief Aerodynamicist); Gabriele Tredozi (Designer)
- Successor: Hispania F111

Technical specifications
- Chassis: carbon-fibre and honeycomb composite monocoque
- Suspension (front): carbon-fibre double wishbone with pushrod and rocker operated inboard damper units
- Suspension (rear): As front
- Length: ~4,800 mm (189.0 in)
- Width: 1,800 mm (70.9 in)
- Height: 1,000 mm (39.4 in)
- Wheelbase: 3,219 mm (126.7 in)
- Engine: Cosworth CA2010 2.4 L (146.5 cu in) V8 (90°), limited to 18,000 RPM, naturally aspirated, mid-mounted
- Transmission: Xtrac Seven-speed with reverse gear, longitudinal sequential semi-automatic
- Weight: 620 kg (1,367 lb) (including driver and camera)
- Fuel: BP
- Tyres: Bridgestone Potenza; OZ Wheels (front and rear): 13"

Competition history
- Notable entrants: Hispania Racing F1 Team
- Notable drivers: 20. (India) Karun Chandhok; 21. (Brazil) Bruno Senna; 20/21. (Japan) Sakon Yamamoto; 20. (Austria) Christian Klien
- Debut: 2010 Bahrain Grand Prix
- Last event: 2010 Abu Dhabi Grand Prix
Races	Wins	Podiums	Poles	F/Laps
19	0	0	0	0

The Hispania F110, also known as the HRT F110, is a Formula One motor racing car designed and built by Dallara for Hispania Racing, for the 2010 season. It was driven by Karun Chandhok, Bruno Senna, Christian Klien and Sakon Yamamoto and was unveiled in Murcia, Spain, on 4 March 2010. It was the first car Hispania Racing entered in Formula One.

The car used a Cosworth engine throughout the course of the 2010 season, of which it competed in every race with two of the four drivers who raced it. The team scored no points with the car during the season and gained the highest result of fourteenth place. This was scored by both Chandhok and Senna and meant that the team were placed eleventh and second-last in the 2010 World Constructors' Championship standings. The car gained no title sponsor from the team, and the car was never developed. Hispania's successor for their 2011 season campaign, the F111, was largely based upon the F110.

== Concept and construction ==
The team was originally entered for the 2010 season by Adrián Campos under the name of "Campos Meta 1", and commissioned Dallara to design and build the car. Financial problems during the winter, however, prevented the team from preparing or testing the chassis, as Campos was unable to pay Dallara, or engine suppliers Cosworth. As a result, the team was sold to shareholder José Ramón Carabante and the team was renamed Hispania Racing F1 less than two weeks before the opening race of the season. Under the guidance of new team principal Colin Kolles, the cars were hurriedly prepared and shipped to Bahrain for the first race of the season.

The F110 was powered by a Cosworth engine, as was also used by the Williams, Lotus and Virgin teams, the latter two of which were also F1 débutants. It also featured a seven-speed Xtrac gearbox, again in common with Lotus. After the car's launch, Gary Anderson described the chassis as "a neat and tidy, if simple, package". He noted the precise aerodynamic sculpting around the sidepods and engine air intake, the "V" profile of the nose derived from the previous year's Red Bull RB5 chassis, and the triple-plane front wing.

Craig Scarborough noted the F110's similarities with the Virgin VR-01 chassis, and Dallara's own IndyCar Series chassis. Geoff Willis, who was later recruited as the team's technical consultant, said that he was "disappointed at the level of engineering in the car" and that he did not think that it "reflects current F1 practise by quite some margin", even allowing for the disrupted construction process. The team's test driver, Christian Klien, also described the F110 as "not quite on an F1 standard", and after driving it in Singapore, he likened it to handling like a rally car. Hispania and Dallara officially parted company on May 26, 2010.

In 2020, Karun Chandhok – who took part in 10 Grands Prix for Hispania – claimed that the battle between Campos and Dallara over the chassis payment led to the team's launch car being raced all season without any upgrades. As a result, the only alteration made to the cars all year was the movement of side-mirrors inboard ahead of a sidepod-mirror ban in China.

== Racing history ==
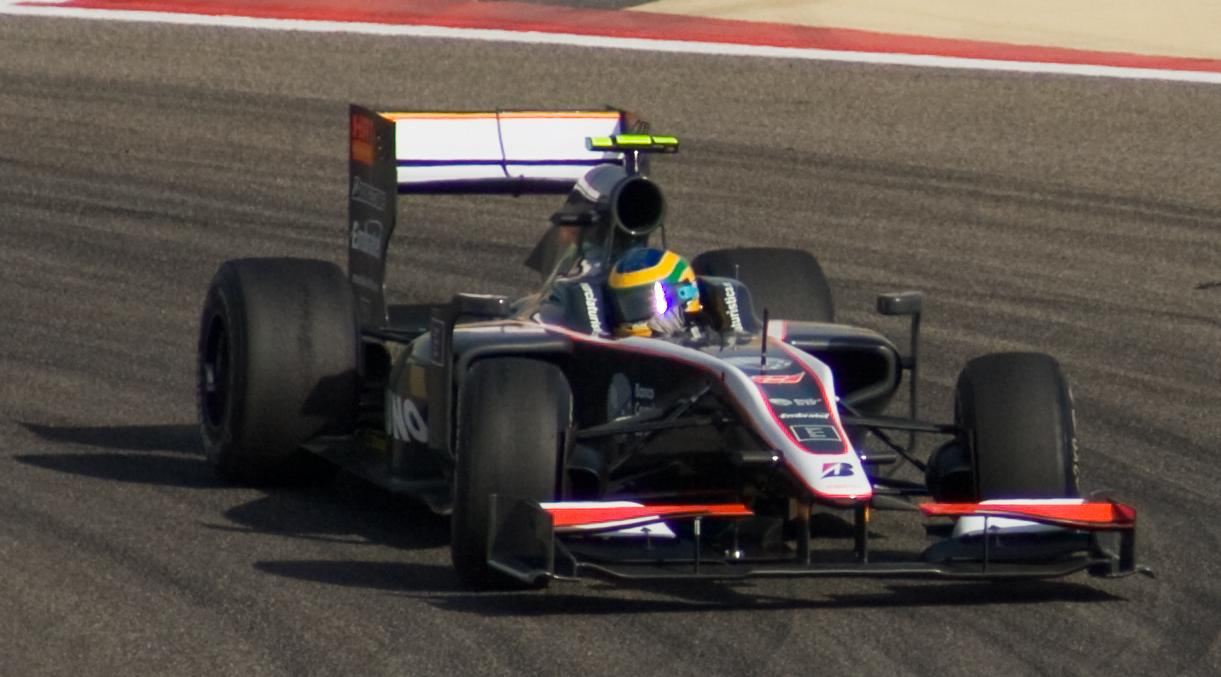
Senna completed the F110's shakedown test during practice for the Bahrain Grand Prix.

With no pre-season testing, the F110 completed its first laps during the weekend of the Bahrain Grand Prix. Senna's car was completed in time for him to complete three installation laps in the first free practice session. In the second session, he completed 17 laps, setting a best time over 11 seconds off the pace, but slid off the road after completing his final lap due to one of his car's wheels coming loose. Senna described the day's work as a "great start", considering the team's lack of preparation. By contrast, the mechanics were unable to make the clutch and gearbox on Chandhok's car work, and he did not complete any laps on Friday. During Saturday's sole practice session, Senna completed 11 more laps, and trimmed his time to within ten seconds of the pace, but Chandhok was further delayed by a hydraulic problem. In qualifying, Senna and Chandhok set the 23rd and 24th-quickest times to share the back row of the starting grid: Chandhok was finally able to complete his car's first laps in anger and set a time 1.7 seconds slower than his team-mate, who was in turn just over eight seconds behind polesitter Sebastian Vettel. For the race, both cars started from the pit lane; Chandhok crashed out on the second lap and Senna retired on lap 18 with an overheating engine.

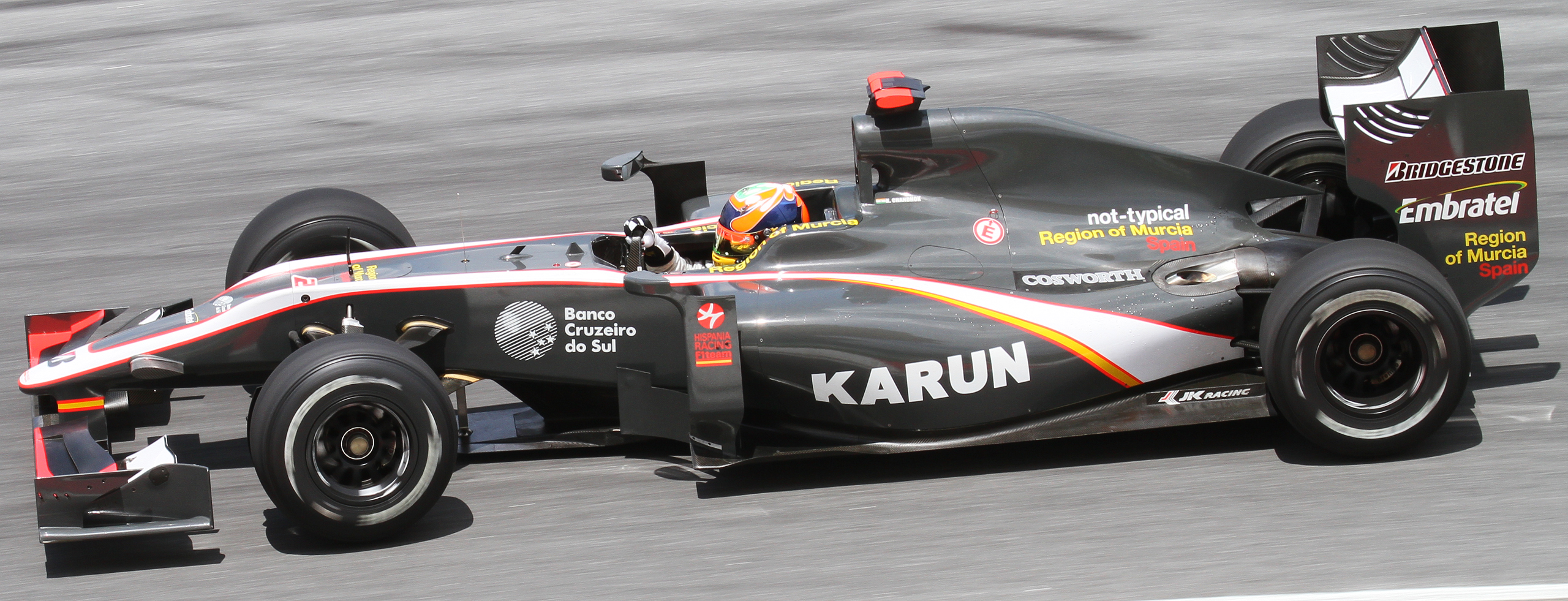
Chandhok recorded the F110's first finish with fourteenth position in Australia and led home the car's first double finish in Malaysia (pictured).

At the Australian Grand Prix, the cars again occupied the back row of the grid, with Senna ahead of Chandhok. The F110s were both 6.6 seconds off the polesitter's time, but only 0.34 seconds behind the Virgin of Lucas di Grassi. Senna's car only lasted four laps of the race before retiring with a hydraulic failure, but Chandhok finished 14th and last for the car's first classified finish, albeit five laps adrift of the winner and three laps behind Heikki Kovalainen's 13th-placed Lotus. This was partly due to a damaged floor caused by Chandhok coming off the track twice during the race.

In Malaysia, Chandhok achieved the F110's best qualifying position without grid rearrangement in 22nd position. In the race both cars ran efficiently and achieved the F110's first double-finish, with Chandhok and Senna finishing in 15th and 16th positions respectively, ahead of the two delayed Lotus drivers. Chandhok finished three laps down, while Senna was another lap behind the leader. At the Chinese Grand Prix, Chandhok received a five-place grid penalty as the team broke the Fédération Internationale de l'Automobile (FIA) seal on his car's gearbox without a representative of the governing body being present; he was then further penalised for his mechanics changing a hydraulic pump assembly with parts of a different specification to the originals, and was made to start from the pit lane. In the race, the F110 achieved another double finish, with Senna leading Chandhok home in 16th and 17th positions respectively.

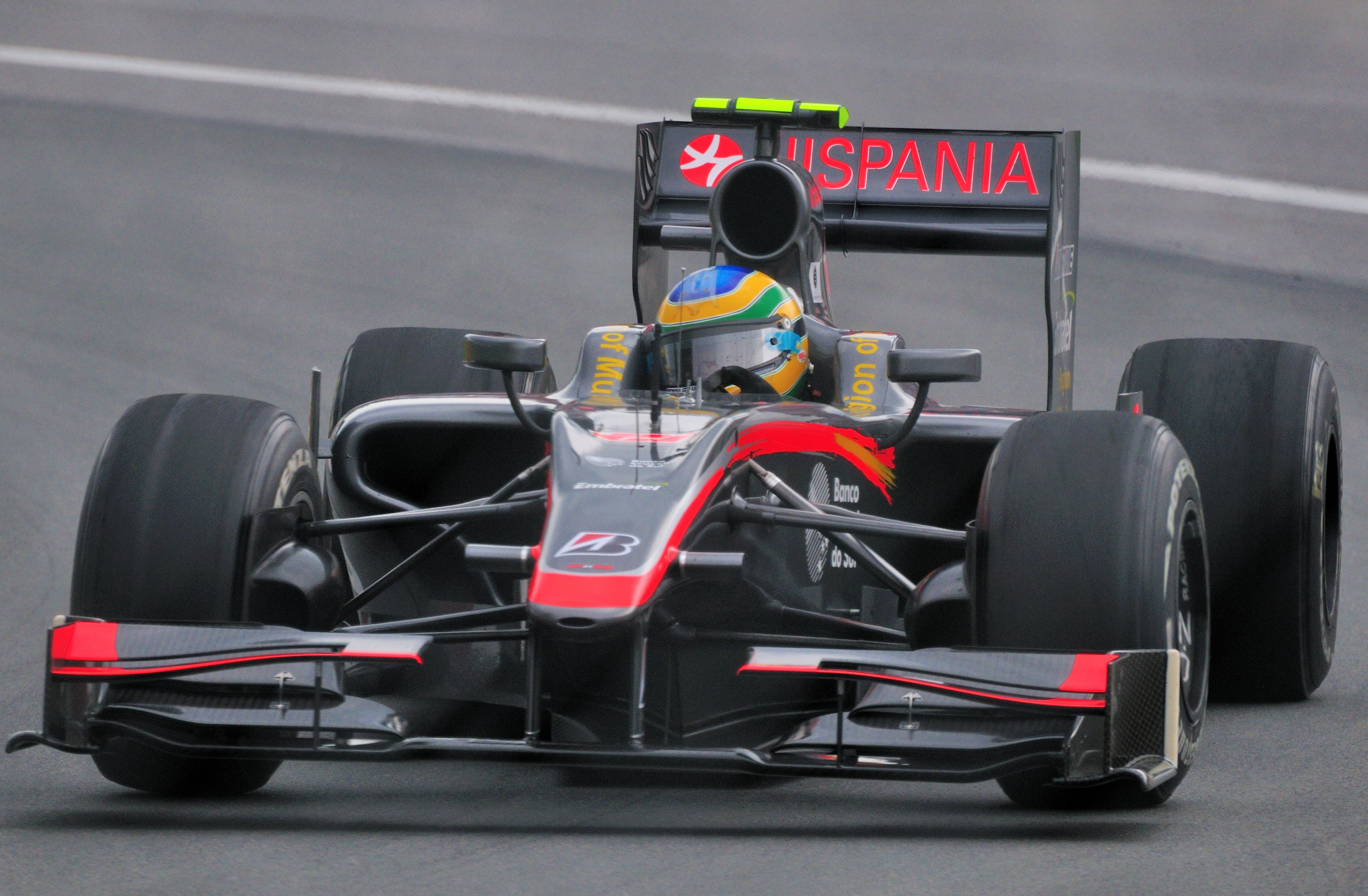
Senna retired his reliveried F110 from the Canadian Grand Prix with gearbox problems.

The team's test driver, Christian Klien, drove the F110 for the first time in free practice for the Spanish Grand Prix, replacing Chandhok for the first session. Chandhok and Senna qualified 23rd and 24th, but Chandhok was again penalised five places on the starting grid, this time for an unscheduled gearbox change. Senna crashed out on the first lap of the race, whilst Chandhok sustained damage to the front end of his F110 after colliding with Jaime Alguersuari as the Toro Rosso driver lapped him, forcing him to retire. At the Monaco Grand Prix, Senna outqualified Chandhok by over a second after new parts were fitted to his car; the drivers started from 22nd and 23rd on the grid as Fernando Alonso was unable to take part in qualifying. In the race, both cars ran ahead of Jarno Trulli's delayed Lotus in the closing stages, but Senna retired with a hydraulic failure on lap 58, whilst Trulli's attempt to pass Chandhok eight laps from the finish resulted in the two cars colliding and retiring from the race, although Chandhok was classified in 14th position. Both drivers also hit Rubens Barrichello's steering wheel, which the Williams driver had thrown from his car after crashing earlier in the race. At the Turkish Grand Prix, Sakon Yamamoto drove the car for the first time in the first practice session instead of Senna.

Senna outqualified Di Grassi whilst Chandhok qualified last, but both cars retired with mechanical problems in the race. At the Canadian Grand Prix, Chandhok missed the third free practice session and did not set a representative time in qualifying due to hydraulic and sensor problems, but Senna outqualified Di Grassi to take 22nd place on the grid. In the race, both drivers were able to race with the Virgin cars; Chandhok finished in 18th position, whilst Senna retired after losing second gear.

Klien returned to drive Senna's car in the first session of Friday free practice for the European Grand Prix. The regular drivers again shared the back row of the grid after qualifying, with Chandhok ahead of Senna. The following day, Chandhok again finished in 18th place, with Senna two places behind after making an unscheduled pit stop for a new front wing, after losing his original part in a collision with Timo Glock's Virgin as the pair were being lapped. At the British Grand Prix, Yamamoto was promoted to the race team in favour of Senna. The drivers again qualified on the back row, with Chandhok ahead, and achieved another double finish in the same order, despite Chandhok sustaining aerodynamic damage to his car from debris. For the German Grand Prix, Senna reclaimed his seat, whilst Yamamoto moved across to the No. 20 car to replace Chandhok. Yamamoto qualified in 23rd position, ahead of Di Grassi, who did not set a time due to a gearbox problem, whilst Senna set the 21st-quickest time, ahead of Vitantonio Liuzzi (Force India), who crashed during the session. Both drivers were then moved up an additional place on the grid when Glock was penalised for an unscheduled gearbox change. After racing with the other new teams, Senna was delayed by a slow puncture and finished in 19th place, and Yamamoto retired on lap 19 when his engine cut out. At the Hungarian Grand Prix, the drivers qualified on the back row of the grid. Senna, who qualified ahead, was then elevated to 22nd position when Kamui Kobayashi (Sauber) was given a penalty for failing to stop at the pit-lane weighbridge when requested. Yamamoto, along with four other drivers, was given a reprimand for failing to achieve the maximum permitted lap time throughout the qualifying session. In the race, the two cars sandwiched Di Grassi at the finish, with Senna and Yamamoto in 17th and 19th places, three and four laps down on the winner respectively.

At the Belgian Grand Prix, a qualifying session held in mixed weather conditions and grid penalties for three drivers allowed the team to claim its best grid positions of the season, as Senna took 18th, one position ahead of Yamamoto. In the race, however, Senna retired early after suffering a suspension failure which caused him to spin, whilst Yamamoto finished, albeit a place lower than he had started. The Italian Grand Prix that followed was held at the high-speed Monza circuit, where the F110 was particularly disadvantaged by the team's lack of a low-downforce aerodynamic package. The drivers qualified slowest, with Senna again ahead, and were then elevated a position each when Glock received a grid penalty for an unscheduled gearbox change. In the race, Senna was another early retirement with a failure in his car's hydraulic system, whilst Yamamoto extended his run of finishes with a 19th place, ahead of Di Grassi, who retired with three laps to go but was classified as a finisher. Yamamoto struck one of his mechanics as he pulled away from his mid-race pit stop, but the man was not seriously injured. During preparation for the Singapore Grand Prix, the team announced that Yamamoto was to be replaced by Klien for the weekend because he was suffering from food poisoning, although several journalists noticed a seemingly healthy Yamamoto in the paddock, indicating that he had been dropped for sponsorship reasons instead. In his first competitive outing since the 2006 Brazilian Grand Prix, Klien outqualified Senna by more than a second; both Hispania cars lined up ahead of Felipe Massa's Ferrari on the grid, as he had failed to set a time during the session. In the race, Klien ran ahead of Senna until Senna collected the crashed Sauber of Kobayashi, who lost control in front of him, on his 30th lap. Klien retired two laps later when his F110's hydraulics failed.

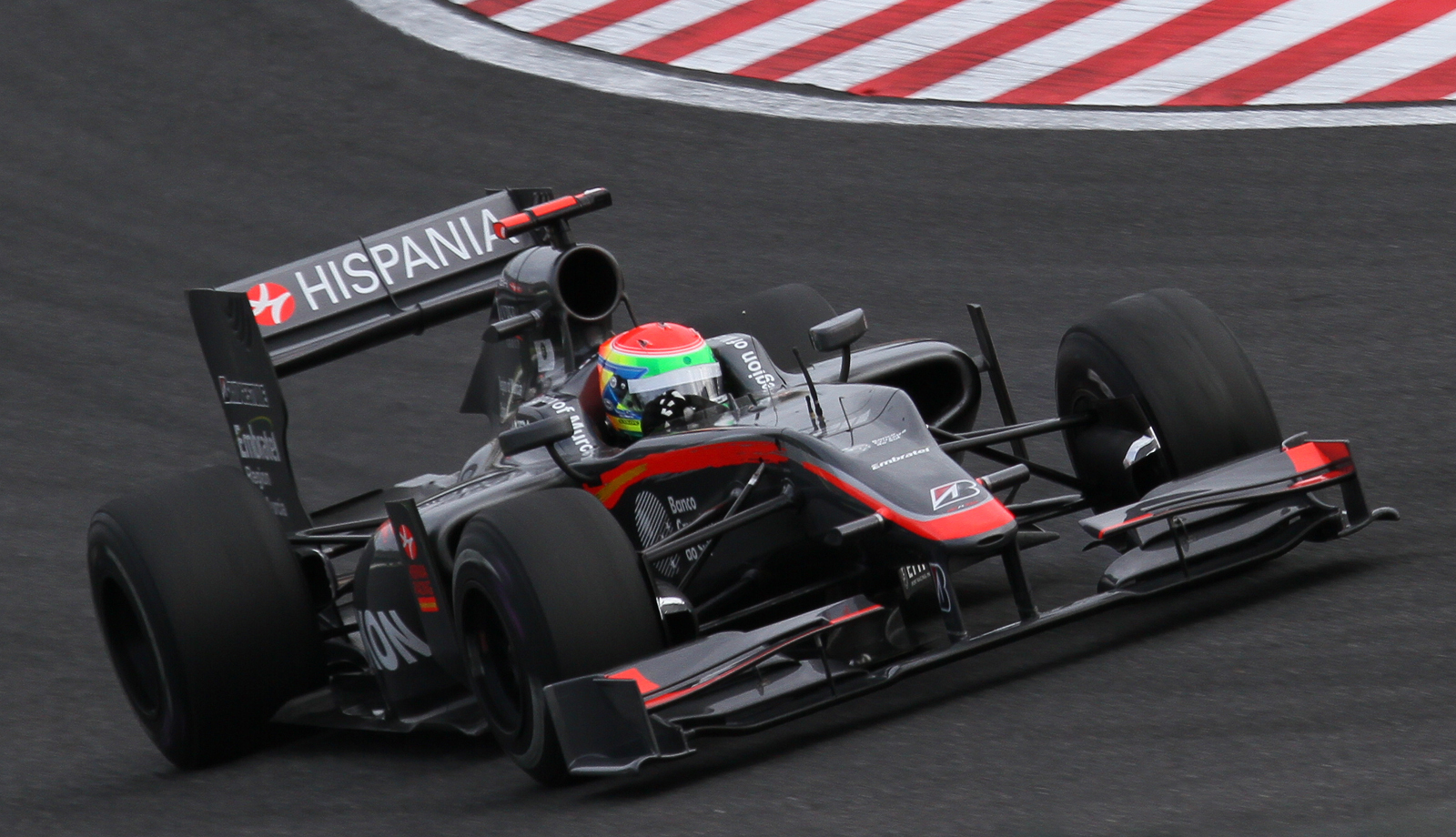
Yamamoto, pictured at the Japanese Grand Prix, took over driving duties in the latter part of the season.

Yamamoto returned to the driving seat for his home race in Japan; he qualified a tenth of a second behind Senna on the back row of the grid. In the race, Senna made a pit stop on the first lap, along with several other drivers, in response to a safety-car period caused by two first-lap accidents. Yamamoto, meanwhile, remained on track, keeping Trulli and Glock behind him for until lap 15 and his own stop on lap 31 respectively, whereupon he dropped behind Senna. The two drivers achieved a double finish, with Senna in 15th position and Yamamoto in 16th, despite the latter suffering from fuel pressure problems.

Yamamoto outqualified Senna for the first time at the inaugural Korean Grand Prix, taking 23rd place on the grid, only a tenth of a second behind Di Grassi. In a race which was delayed by heavy rain, both drivers kept their F110s on track to record their best finishes of the season, with Senna in 14th and Yamamoto in 15th (albeit still the last drivers to be classified). Yamamoto also survived almost being taken out by Di Grassi when the Virgin driver lost control whilst trying to overtake him on lap 26. Klien replaced Yamamoto again for the Brazilian Grand Prix, and again outqualified Senna for 23rd place. Senna also received a grid penalty for an unscheduled gearbox change, which had no effect upon him as he had qualified last anyway. In the race, Senna raced competitively with the drivers in the other new teams; the gap between Kovalainen, Trulli, Glock and Senna was just eight seconds at the end of the 71-lap race, although he finished only 21st due to a very low attrition rate. Klien failed to take the start due to fluctuating fuel pressure, and joined the race from the pit lane after losing four laps, eventually finishing a place behind Senna and six laps behind the winner. At the final race of the season in Abu Dhabi, the Hispania drivers again occupied the final row of the grid, with Senna ahead of Klien this time, and they maintained this order in the race, finishing fourteen seconds apart in 19th and 20th positions respectively.

Competing with the F110, the Hispania team scored no points, with a best classified finish of 14th achieved on three occasions: Chandhok at the Australian and Monaco Grands Prix, and Senna at the Korean Grand Prix. The team's best qualifying performance was Senna's 18th position on the grid at the Belgian Grand Prix, but the F110 had the worst qualifying record of all the cars that competed in the 2010 season: of the 27 drivers who took part, Senna, Yamamoto, Klien and Chandhok had the lowest average grid position overall (in that order). Nevertheless, the team finished ahead of Virgin in the World Constructors' Championship due to a better finishing record: Glock and Di Grassi only managed two 14th-place finishes between them compared to the Hispania drivers' three.

== Sponsorship and livery ==
The F110 was liveried in dark grey, with a white, yellow and red stripe running down each sidepod and meeting at the nosecone. The car had no title sponsor, with small stickers for Embratel, the Banco Cruzeiro do Sul and the Murcia tourist board. The sidepods were liveried with the drivers' first names. The livery was tweaked slightly from the Spanish Grand Prix onwards and several other minor sponsors also appeared on the car from race to race; however, the car itself was not developed over the course of the season.

At the Chinese Grand Prix, the logo of the Chinese motorsport brand FCACA was seen on the cars. From the British Grand Prix onwards through the end of the season, the Jaypee Group logo appeared on the engine cover.

== Hispania F111 ==
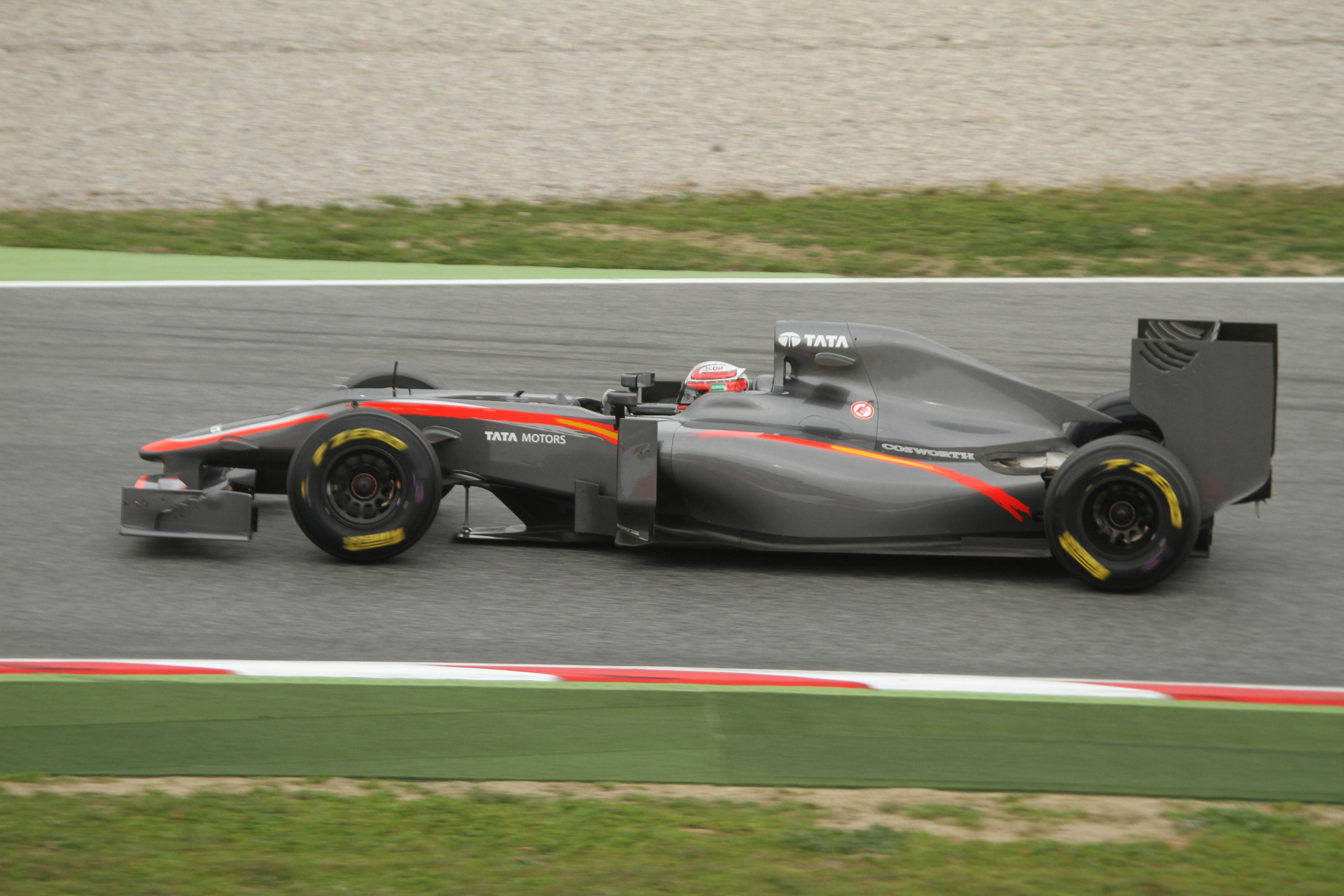
The F110 being driven during the pre-season testing for the 2011 season.

Hispania used the F110 in pre-season testing for the 2011 season, and continued to do so until the new car, designed by Willis and featuring a Williams hydraulic system, was completed. The new car, designated F111, was itself a development of the F110.

== Complete Formula One results ==
(key) (results in bold indicate pole position; results in italics indicate fastest lap)

Year	Entrant	Engine	Tyres	Drivers	1	2	3	4	5	6	7	8	9	10	11	12	13	14	15	16	17	18	19	Points	WCC
2010	Hispania Racing F1 Team	Cosworth CA2010 V8	**B**		BHR	AUS	MAL	CHN	ESP	MON	TUR	CAN	EUR	GBR	GER	HUN	BEL	ITA	SIN	JPN	KOR	BRA	ABU	0	11th
2010	Hispania Racing F1 Team	Cosworth CA2010 V8	**B**	(India) Karun Chandhok	Ret	14	15	17	Ret	14^{†}	20^{†}	18	18	19										0	11th
2010	Hispania Racing F1 Team	Cosworth CA2010 V8	**B**	(Brazil) Bruno Senna	Ret	Ret	16	16	Ret	Ret	Ret	Ret	20		19	17	Ret	Ret	Ret	15	14	21	19	0	11th
2010	Hispania Racing F1 Team	Cosworth CA2010 V8	**B**	(Japan) Sakon Yamamoto										20	Ret	19	20	19		16	15			0	11th
2010	Hispania Racing F1 Team	Cosworth CA2010 V8	**B**	(Austria) Christian Klien															Ret			22	20	0	11th

^{†} Driver did not finish the race, but was classified as they had completed >90% of the race distance.
