= Geoff Willis =

Formula One designer

- Born: 23 December 1959 (age 66); Southampton, England
- Education: University of Cambridge – Mechanical Engineering; Exeter University PhD Hydrodynamics
- Occupation: Chief Technical Director
- Employer: INEOS Britannia
- Predecessor: Dr. Finlay Evans

Geoffrey Willis (born 23 December 1959) is a British engineer and the Chief Technical Director of INEOS Britannia. Previously, Willis held senior technical positions with a range of Formula One teams including Mercedes, Red Bull Racing and British American Racing.

== Early life and career ==
Willis was born in Southampton in December 1959. As a youngster, Willis recounted spending time sailing on the Solent, along with a keen interest in Airfix model kits. He spent a year in civil engineering before attending Gonville and Caius College, Cambridge, where he completed his undergraduate degree in Engineering with a focus on mathematics. Cambridge offered Willis the opportunity to follow on with a PhD, but he declined and left to join the National Physical Laboratory. He later would complete his PhD externally with Exeter University, focused on his work in hydrodynamics.

Whilst working in Oxfordshire at the NPL, Willis was approached to join the design team of the Peter de Savary's British America's Cup challenger Blue Arrow and he spent the next three years designing and developing hull and keel designs for the team in preparation for the competition in San Diego.

== Formula One ==
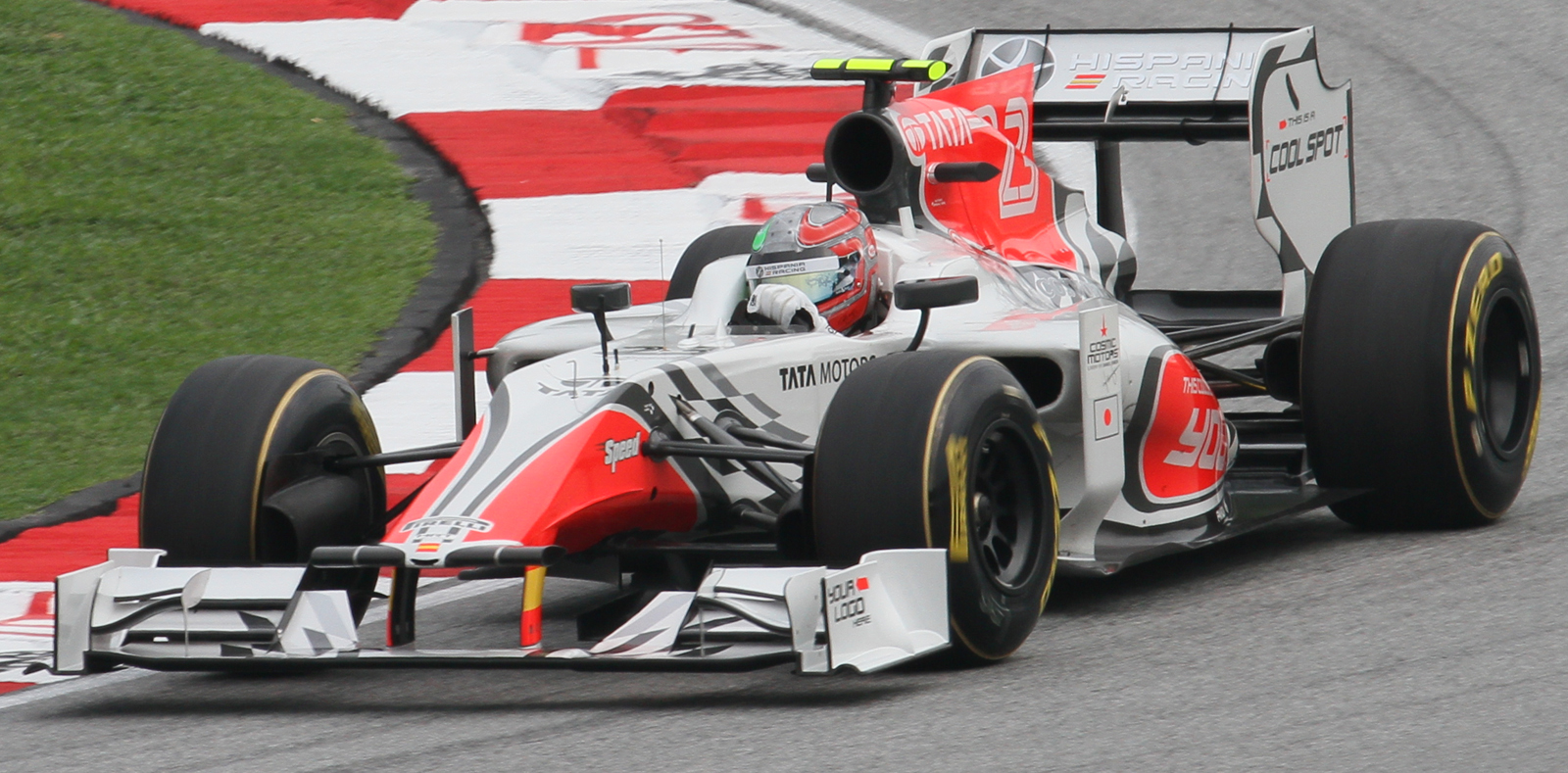
Willis work on the Hispania F111 was lauded but he left mid-way through the season

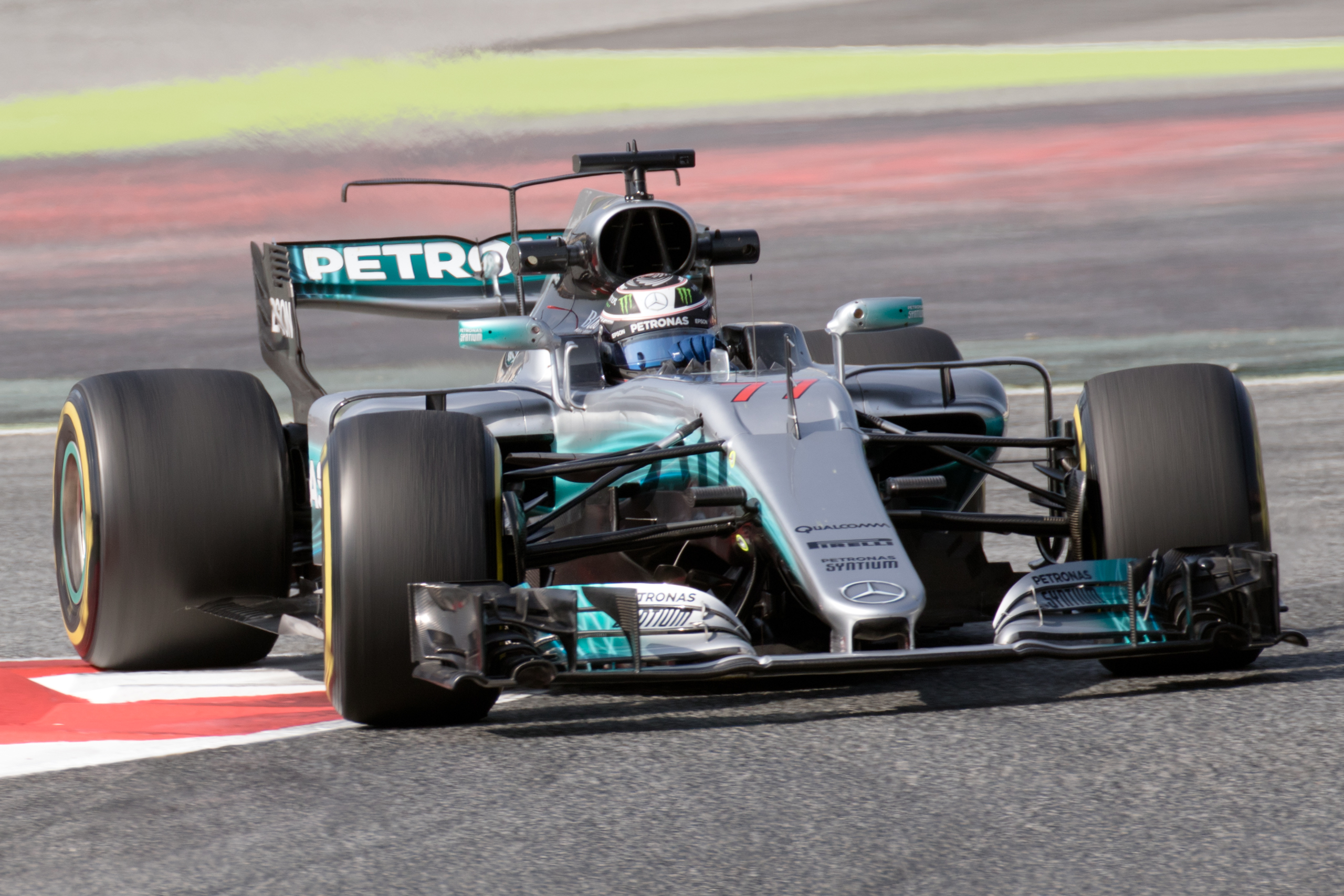
Willis was Technology Director for the Mercedes AMG F1 W08 EQ Power+ which won both World Championships

In 1990, Willis moved into Formula One and joined the Leyton House team where he met, and worked alongside, Adrian Newey. It was through this association that he joined Williams, after Newey was recruited by the British team. Willis worked extensively on computational fluid dynamics at Williams, a new concept of aerodynamics and engineering in Formula One at the time. When Newey moved to rival McLaren in 1997, Willis was promoted, alongside Gavin Fisher, to become chief aerodynamicist beneath Patrick Head.

Willis joined BAR in late 2001, recruited by outgoing team principal Craig Pollock. David Richards joined the team for the 2002 campaign at a time when Honda reaffirmed their commitment to engine supply. The team struggled during 2002 as the changes took shape, with Olivier Panis leaving ahead of 2003 to be replaced by British driver Jenson Button. The 2004 season was the most successful for the team, under Willis technical stewardship, the team finished 2nd in the constructors championship behind Ferrari. At the end of the season, Honda took a 45% acquisition of the team, and whilst Richards would move on, Willis remained as Technical Director for the final season as BAR in 2005.

Willis oversaw the new Honda RA106 built to the new Formula One specifications for the 2006 season. However, by late June, his role within the team became unclear when Honda appointed Shuhei Nakamoto as Senior Technical Director. Willis had been told to stop going to races in order to focus on aerodynamics, which appeared to conflict with the appointment of Mariano Alperin to head the aerodynamics group using Honda's new full-size wind tunnel. Willis would leave the team shortly afterwards.

On 17 July 2007, Willis was hired by Red Bull Racing as the team's Technical Director, once again under Newey. His tenure coincided with the teams Renault customer engine era, along with the transition from David Coulthard to Sebastian Vettel. He left Red Bull in July 2009 after his role was made redundant.

In early 2010, Willis joined the new entry Hispania Racing F1 Team. However, the season began poorly with both cars starting from the pitlane in the opening round, and Chandhok retiring on the opening lap leading to speculation Willis would leave the team by April. He was connected with joining Force India, however remained at the team. Having vocalised his concerns about the car design, Willis was a critic of the lack of in-season testing available to the new teams. Hispania would have a poor debut season with no points scored and finishing in 11th place in the constructors championship. Having been lauded by new owner José Ramón Carabante ahead of the 2011 season, Willis became increasingly vocal about the lack of finance and resources of the Spanish team, and demanded improvements. However by September 2011, Willis had left the team, to be replaced in 2012 by Toni Cuquerella, formerly of Seat's World Touring Car Championship team.

Willis signed a contract to join Mercedes as Technology director in October 2011 alongside Aldo Costa. Willis played a key part in the technical team that delivered drivers world championship titles for Lewis Hamilton and Nico Rosberg and eight consecutive constructors championship titles for Mercedes.

== Return to sailing ==
In 2022, Willis joined INEOS Britannia as Chief Technical Director, supporting the team in the America's Cup yacht race.
