= Sakon Yamamoto =

Japanese racing driver and politician (born 1982)

- 山本 左近
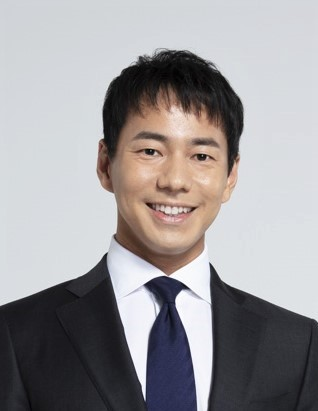
- Official portrait, 2022

Member of the House of Representatives
- Incumbent
- Assumed office 9 February 2026
- Constituency: Tōkai PR
- In office 5 November 2021 – 9 October 2024
- Constituency: Tōkai PR

Personal details
- Born: 9 July 1982 (age 44) Toyohashi, Aichi, Japan
- Party: Liberal Democratic
- Education: Nanzan University
- Website: sakonyamamoto.com

Formula One World Championship career
- Nationality: (Japan) Japanese
- Active years: 2006–2007, 2010
- Team(s): Super Aguri, Spyker, HRT
- Entries: 21
- Championships: 0
- Wins: 0
- Podiums: 0
- Career points: 0
- Pole positions: 0
- Fastest laps: 0
- First entry: 2006 German Grand Prix
- Last entry: 2010 Korean Grand Prix

Previous series
- 2020 2015 2009 2008–2009 2007–2008 2005–2006 2005–2006 2001, 2004 2003 2002 2001: Super Formula Lights; Formula E ADAC GT Masters; GP2 Asia Series; GP2 Series; Formula Nippon; Super GT; Japanese F3; F3 Euro Series; German F3; British F3

Sakon Yamamoto (Japanese: 山本 左近, Hepburn: Yamamoto Sakon; born 9 July 1982) is a Japanese politician and former racing driver who is a member of the House of Representatives since 2026, previously serving from 2021 to 2024. He is a member of the Liberal Democratic Party.

He previously competed in Formula One between 2006 and 2010. (Note: The exact years Yamamoto competed in Formula One: 2006–2007, 2010.)

== Before Formula One ==
Yamamoto was born in Toyohashi, Aichi Prefecture. He began his racing career in 1994 at the Suzuka Circuit Racing School (Karting), and worked his way up through the ranks, to become the test/third driver for the Jordan Formula One team for one weekend (Japan) during the 2005 Formula One season.

== Formula One ==
=== Super Aguri (2006) ===
On 8 June 2006, Yamamoto joined the Super Aguri F1 team as their test driver and third driver on grand prix weekends, helping Takuma Sato and Franck Montagny in Friday's free practice sessions. Yamamoto replaced Montagny in the second team car at the German Grand Prix in Hockenheim. He did not enjoy a particularly successful start to his career, however, with a mechanical failure and a stalled engine restricting him to a total of one lap in his first two races. He also damaged one of the team's new SA06 chassis in a crash during Free Practice at the German Grand Prix. He then spun out of his third Grand Prix in Turkey, a disappointment after outqualifying Sato for the first time.

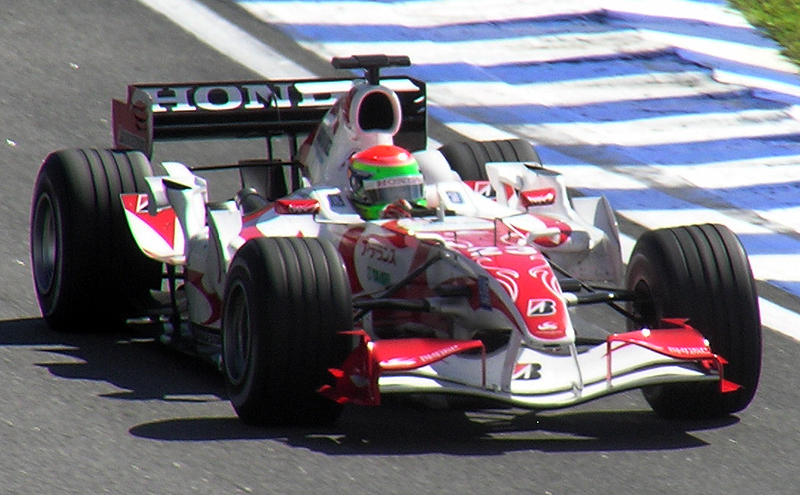
Yamamoto driving the Super Aguri SA06 at the 2006 Brazilian Grand Prix where he set the 7th fastest lap of the race.

At the 2006 Italian Grand Prix, Yamamoto had a major effect on the championship after suffering a tyre delamination during qualifying, which consigned him to last place on the grid. Later on in the session, Fernando Alonso punctured a tyre on debris from this incident, an occurrence which would eventually result in the points leader being penalised for blocking Felipe Massa and dropping from fifth to tenth on the grid. During the race, Yamamoto suffered hydraulic problems and had to start from the pit lane, eventually retiring when it became terminal.

At the 2006 Chinese Grand Prix, however, Yamamoto finished for the first time, albeit four laps down in sixteenth place. After the race, his enjoyment was spoiled when Nick Heidfeld admonished him for an incident on the last lap which had dropped the German from fourth to seventh place. However, Heidfeld had mistaken Yamamoto for Sato, the driver who caused the incident, and apologised for his mistake before the 2006 Japanese Grand Prix.

Yamamoto finished the season strongly with three consecutive finishes, an upturn in form after retiring from his first four Grands Prix. He also set the seventh fastest lap and second fastest middle sector during the 2006 Brazilian Grand Prix. However, this was not enough to prevent him losing out to Anthony Davidson in the race for the second Super Aguri race drive in 2007. However, he remained as a test driver at Super Aguri. This was combined with him competing in the 2007 GP2 Series season with BCN Competicion.

=== Spyker (2007) ===
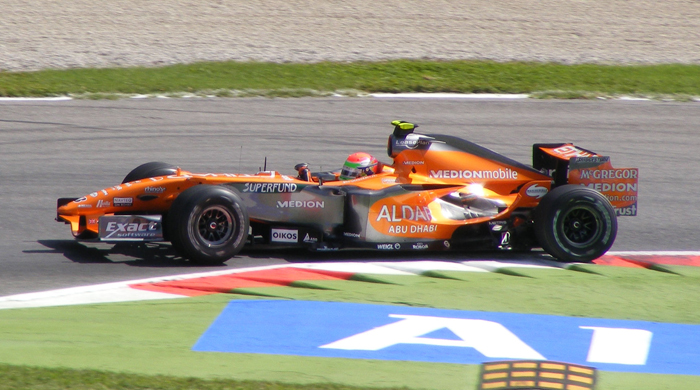
Yamamoto driving for Spyker F1 at the 2007 Italian Grand Prix

With the departure of Christijan Albers from the Spyker F1 team after the 2007 British Grand Prix, a position on the grid became available. On 26 July 2007, after Markus Winkelhock filled the seat at the eventful 2007 European Grand Prix, Spyker confirmed that they hired Yamamoto from Super Aguri for the remainder of the 2007 Formula One season by Spyker. During his first Grand Prix for Spyker at Hungary, he crashed out on lap 4. After that, he finished all the races in last position, except the 2007 Japanese Grand Prix, where he finished ahead of Jarno Trulli, and in the 2007 Brazilian Grand Prix where Giancarlo Fisichella crashed into him on the first laps. After the season ended, Yamamoto did not participate in any other event for the team.

=== Renault (2008) ===
It was announced on 4 February 2008 that Yamamoto would be one of the test drivers for the Renault F1 Team. According to the press release, he would only drive the car in public demonstrations and not in circuit tests, with Lucas di Grassi and Romain Grosjean being announced as circuit test drivers at the launch of the Renault R28. Sanho Human Service sponsored Spyker F1 when Yamamoto was a driver, and it was announced at the R28 launch that Sanho Human Service would sponsor Renault in 2008.

=== Return to GP2 (2008–2009) ===
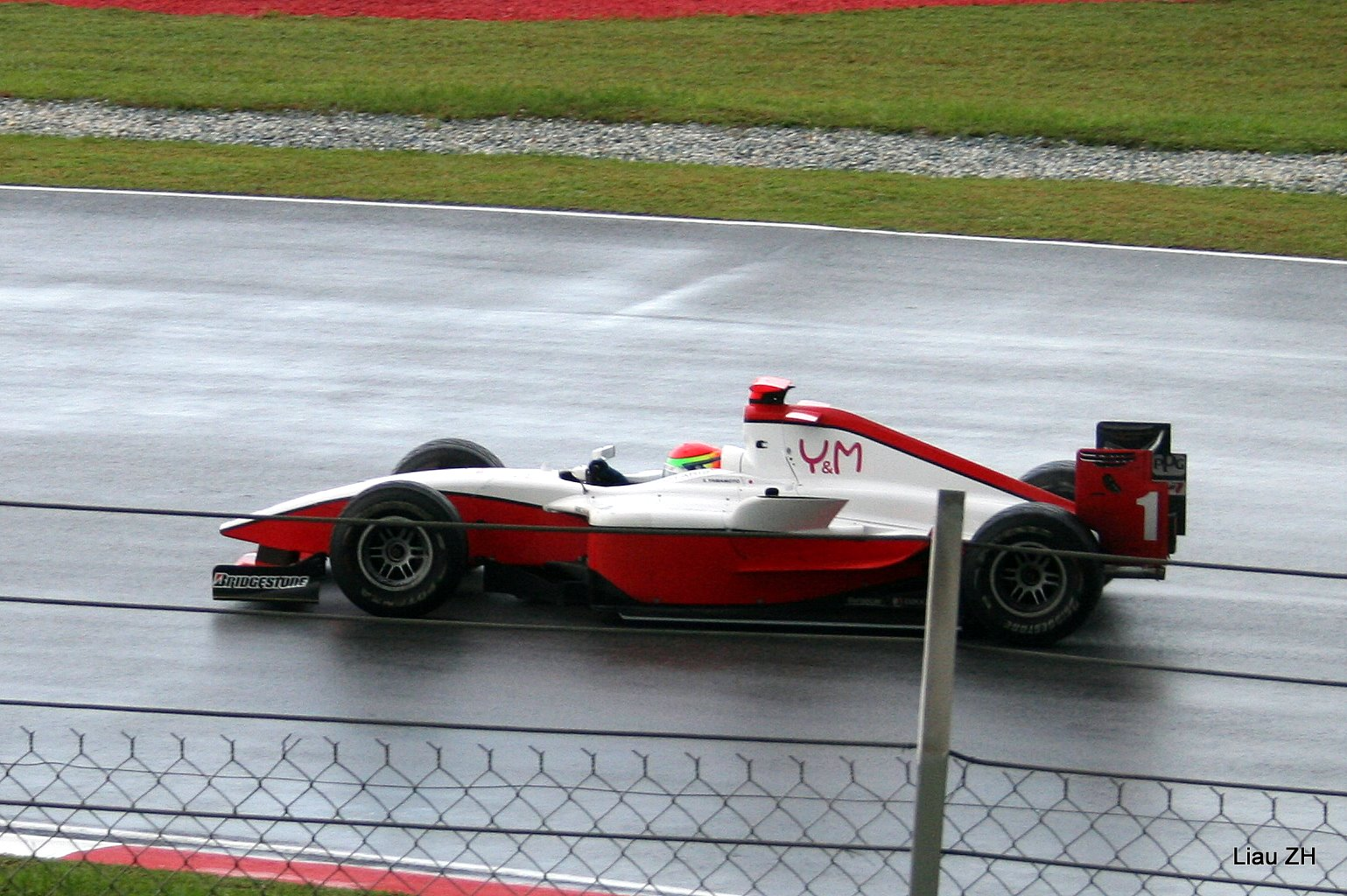
Yamamoto racing for ART Grand Prix in Sepang

Yamamoto made his return to the GP2 series halfway through the 2008 season, as the ART Grand Prix team elected to employ him in place of the underperforming Luca Filippi. Finishing fourth in the sprint race at Hungaroring, he scored his first ever points in any racing class outside Japan.

Yamamoto kept his seat at ART for the 2008–09 GP2 Asia Series where he was looking to emulate the success of Grosjean, who won the inaugural championship with the team. However, he was somewhat overshadowed by team-mates Nico Hülkenberg and Pastor Maldonado, but managed to finish ninth in the championship, with a podium at the opening race in Shanghai.

=== HRT (2010) ===
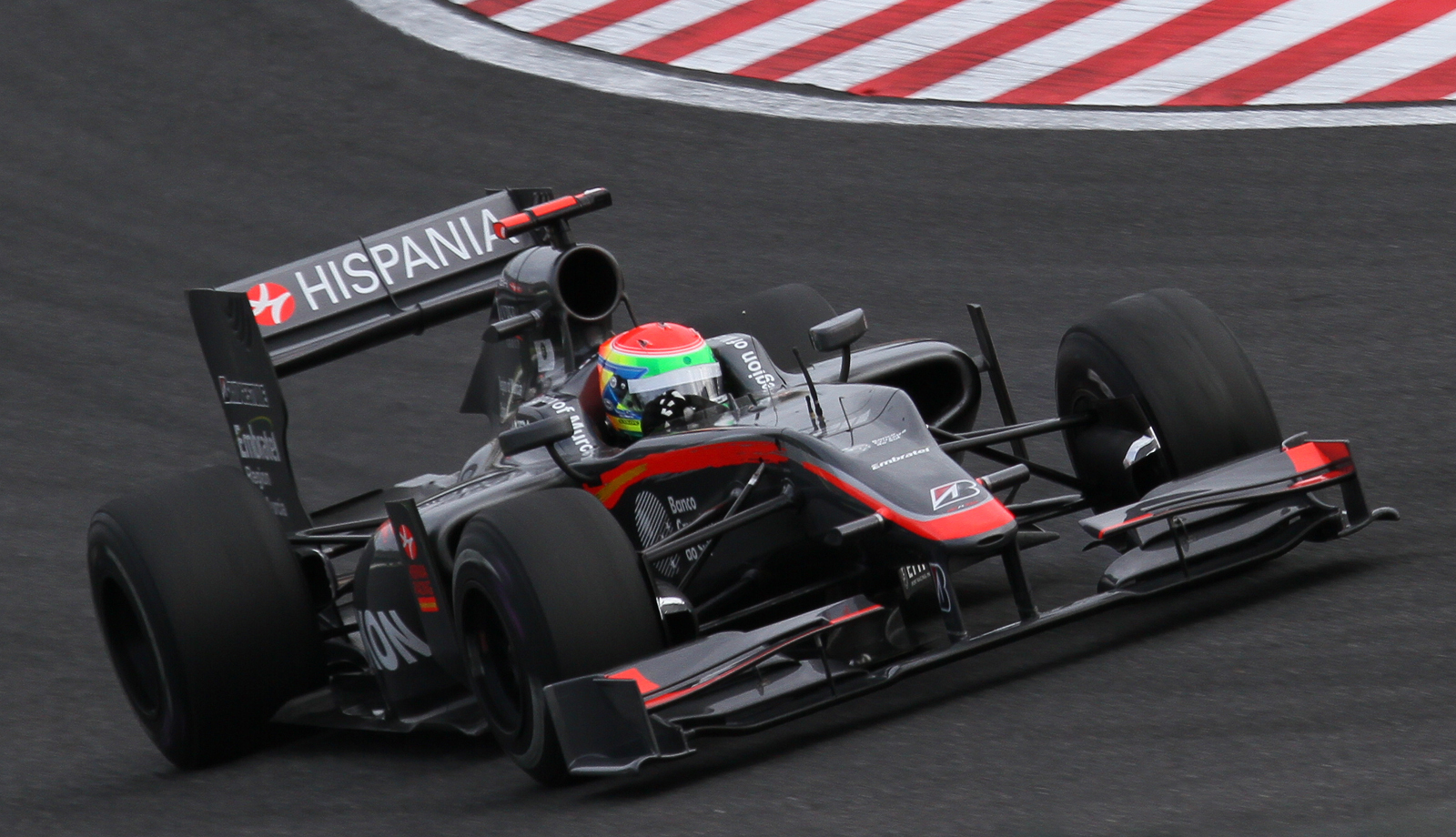
Yamamoto driving for Hispania Racing at the 2010 Japanese Grand Prix

On 17 April 2010, the Hispania Racing team announced that Yamamoto would become the test and reserve driver for the team, and that he would drive the car in free practice sessions over the course of the 2010 season, helping Hispania develop their car. He took part in his first practice session for the team at the Turkish Grand Prix where he set the slowest lap time of the session. On 8 July 2010, HRT team principal Colin Kolles announced that Yamamoto was to replace Bruno Senna for the British Grand Prix, where he qualified 24th and last, he went on to finish 20th and last, just behind his team-mate Karun Chandhok. Yamamoto replaced Chandhok at the German Grand Prix, where he retired after 19 laps with an engine problem. He kept this seat for the Hungarian Grand Prix, in which he was lapped by his team-mate Senna. At the Italian Grand Prix, Yamamoto accelerated from the pits as a mechanic was fixing the radio connection to his helmet. His rear wing struck the mechanic resulting in him being taken to hospital where he stayed for ten days before being discharged and returning home to Germany. He was replaced at the Singapore Grand Prix by test driver Christian Klien after reportedly suffering food poisoning. He returned at the following race in Japan, finishing in 16th place, albeit last of the 16 cars to make the flag. He bettered this result by coming 15th in Korea, but was again replaced by Klien for the final two races in Brazil and Abu Dhabi.

=== Virgin (2011) ===
On 23 March 2011, Marussia Virgin Racing announced that Yamamoto would be the team's reserve driver for the first three races of the 2011 season.

== Later career ==
=== Formula E ===
Yamamoto was called in to replace António Félix da Costa for the 2015 London ePrix. He raced for Amlin Aguri, partnering Salvador Duran. Round 10 saw Yamamoto qualify his car in 18th position but he retired from the race after a problem with the battery coming out of the pits. The next race saw him suffer a similar fate. He failed to set a time in qualifying after the tricky rain conditions caused him to hit the wall and then also retired from the race after running into the back of Jarno Trulli. He finished the season with no points and 35th and last in the standings.

=== Super Formula Lights ===
Yamamoto entered the last round of the 2020 Super Formula Lights at Fuji for B-Max, scoring a best finish of seventh in the third race.

== After racing ==
Yamamoto has not raced regularly since his Formula E outings, and has concentrated on a career in medicine and social welfare. In 2012, he became the head of a medical and social welfare corporation in Japan, with particular emphasis on improving the social welfare of the elderly. He also lectures and provides support to schools in the same field. He also still works in racing, in broadcasting and the media.

On 31 October 2021, Yamamoto was elected to the Japanese House of Representatives.

== Racing record ==
=== Career summary ===
Season	Series	Team	Races	Wins	Poles	F/Laps	Podiums	Points	Position
2001	Japanese Formula 3 Championship	TOM'S	18	0	0	0	5	117	4th
2001	British Formula 3 Championship	Team Avanti	4	0	0	0	0	0	25th
2002	German Formula 3 Championship	GM Motorsport	11	0	0	0	0	0	20th
2002	German Formula 3 Championship	Team Kolles Racing	6	0	0	0	0	0	20th
2003	Formula 3 Euro Series	Superfund TME	20	0	0	0	0	0	27th
2004	Japanese Formula 3 Championship	TOM'S	20	1	0	4	4	131	7th
2005	Super GT	TOM'S	8	1	0	0	1	43	7th
2005	Formula Nippon	Kondo Racing	9	0	0	0	1	9	10th
2005	Formula One	Jordan Grand Prix	Test driver						
2006	Formula One	Super Aguri F1	7	0	0	0	0	0	26th
2006	Super GT	Nismo	3	0	0	0	1	15	21st
2006	Formula Nippon	Kondo Racing	3	0	0	0	0	3.5	11th
2007	GP2 Series	BCN Competición	11	0	0	0	0	0	30th
2007	Formula One	Etihad Aldar Spyker F1	7	0	0	0	0	0	24th
2008	GP2 Series	ART Grand Prix	10	0	0	0	0	3	23rd
2008	Formula One	ING Renault F1 Team	Test driver						
2008–09	GP2 Asia Series	ART Grand Prix	11	0	0	0	1	13	9th
2009	ADAC GT Masters	Team Rosberg	13	0	0	0	0	1	32nd
2010	Formula One	Hispania Racing F1 Team	7	0	0	0	0	0	26th
2011	Formula One	Marussia Virgin Racing	Reserve driver						
2014-15	Formula E	Amlin Aguri	2	0	0	0	0	0	35th
2020	Super Formula Lights	B-Max Racing	3	0	0	0	0	0	16th
2020	Super Taikyu - ST-TCR	Rebellion Team Mars	1	0	1	0	1	77.5‡	**3rd‡**

‡ Team standings.

=== Complete Japanese Formula Three Championship results ===
(key) (Races in bold indicate pole position) (Races in italics indicate fastest lap)

Year	Entrant	Chassis	Engine	1	2	3	4	5	6	7	8	9	10	11	12	13	14	15	16	17	18	19	20	DC	Points
2001	TOM'S	Dallara F301	Toyota-TOM'S 3S-GE	SUZ1; 1 DNS	SUZ1; 2; 9	TSU; 1; 12	TSU; 2; 10	FUJ; 1; 10	FUJ; 2 Ret	MIN; 1 Ret	MIN; 2; 9	MOT1; 1; 5	MOT1; 2; 4	SUZ2; 3	SUG; 1 Ret	SUG; 2; 3	SEN; 1; 3	SEN; 2; 4	OKA; 1; 2	OKA; 2; 2	MOT2; 1; 5	MOT2; 2; 4		4th	117
2004	TOM'S	Dallara F304	Toyota-TOM'S 3S-GE	SUZ1; 1; 3	SUZ1; 2; 10	TSU; 1; 5	TSU; 2; 6	OKA; 1 Ret	OKA; 2; 5	MOT1; 1; 8	MOT1; 2; 5	SUZ2; 1 Ret	SUZ2; 2; 4	SUG; 1; 8	SUG; 2 Ret	MIN1; 1; 7	MIN1; 2; 4	SEN; 1 Ret	SEN; 2; 8	MIN2; 1; 3	MIN2; 2; 5	MOT2; 1; 2	**MOT2**; **2**; 1	7th	131

=== Complete British Formula Three Championship results ===
(key) (Races in bold indicate pole position) (Races in italics indicate fastest lap)

Year	Entrant	Chassis	Engine	1	2	3	4	5	6	7	8	9	10	11	12	13	14	15	16	17	18	19	20	21	22	23	24	25	26	DC	Points
2001	Team Avanti	Dallara F301	Spiess-Opel	SIL1; 1	SIL1; 2	SNE; 1	SNE; 2	DON1; 1	DON1; 2	OUL; 1	OUL; 2	CRO; 1	CRO; 2	ROC; 1	ROC; 2	CAS; 1	CAS; 2	BRH1; 1	BRH1; 2	DON2; 1	DON2; 2	KNO; 1	KNO; 2	THR; 1	THR; 2	BRH2; 1 Ret	BRH2; 2; 15	SIL2; 1 Ret	SIL2; 2 Ret	25th	0

=== Complete German Formula Three Championship/Formula 3 Euro Series results ===
(key) (Races in bold indicate pole position) (Races in italics indicate fastest lap)

Year	Entrant	Chassis	Engine	1	2	3	4	5	6	7	8	9	10	11	12	13	14	15	16	17	18	19	20	DC	Points
2002	GM Motorsport	Dallara F302	Toyota	HOC1; 1; 22	HOC1; 2 Ret	NÜR1; 1 C	NÜR1; 2 C	SAC; 1; 11	SAC; 2; 20†	NOR; 1; 14	NOR; 2 Ret	LAU; 1; 18	LAU; 2; 25	HOC2; 1; 17	HOC2; 2; 8	NÜR2; 1 DNQ	NÜR2; 2 Ret							20th	0
2002	Team Kolles Racing	Dallara F302	Mugen-Honda															A1R; 1; 16	A1R; 2 Ret	ZAN; 1 Ret	ZAN; 2; 21	HOC3; 1; 9	HOC3; 2; 18	20th	0
2003	Superfund TME	Dallara F303/001	Toyota	HOC; 1; 15	HOC; 2; 10	ADR; 1; 22	ADR; 2; 9	PAU; 1; 23†	PAU; 2; 18	NOR; 1 Ret	NOR; 2; 11	LMS; 1; 9	LMS; 2; 26†	NÜR; 1; 19	NÜR; 2; 19	A1R; 1; 22	A1R; 2; 15	ZAN; 1 Ret	ZAN; 2; 16	HOC; 1 Ret	HOC; 2; 18	MAG; 1; 17	MAG; 2; 11	27th	0

† Driver did not finish the race, but was classified as he completed over 90% of the race distance.

=== Complete Formula Nippon results ===
(key)

Year	Entrant	1	2	3	4	5	6	7	8	9	DC	Points
2005	Kondo Racing	MOT; 14	SUZ; Ret	SUG; Ret	FUJ; Ret	SUZ; 4	MIN; 8	FUJ; Ret	MOT; 2	SUZ; 11	10th	9
2006	Kondo Racing	FUJ; 6‡	SUZ; 4	MOT; 14	SUZ	AUT	FUJ	SUG	MOT	SUZ	11th	3.5

‡ Race stopped earlier due to heavy rain. Only half-points were awarded.

=== Complete Super GT results ===
(key) (Races in bold indicate pole position) (Races in italics indicate fastest lap)

Year	Team	Car	Class	1	2	3	4	5	6	7	8	9	DC	Pts	Ref
2005	Toyota Team TOM'S	Toyota Supra	GT500	OKA; 6	FUJ; 6	SEP; 13	SUG; 1	MOT; 8	FUJ; 7	AUT; Ret	SUZ; 7		7th	43	
2006	NISMO	Nissan Fairlady Z	GT500	SUZ; 12	OKA; 3	FUJ; 9	SEP	SUG	SUZ	MOT	AUT	FUJ	21st	15	

=== Complete Formula One results ===
(key)

Year	Entrant	Chassis	Engine	1	2	3	4	5	6	7	8	9	10	11	12	13	14	15	16	17	18	19	WDC	Points
2005	Jordan Grand Prix	Jordan EJ15B	Toyota RVX-05 3.0 V10	AUS	MAL	BHR	SMR	ESP	MON	EUR	CAN	USA	FRA	GBR	GER	HUN	TUR	ITA	BEL	BRA	JPN; TD	CHN	–	–
2006	Super Aguri F1 Team	Super Aguri SA05	Honda RA806E 2.4 V8	BHR	MAL	AUS	SMR	EUR	ESP	MON	GBR; TD	CAN; TD	USA; TD	FRA; TD									26th	0
2006	Super Aguri F1 Team	Super Aguri SA06	Honda RA806E 2.4 V8												GER; Ret	HUN; Ret	TUR; Ret	ITA; Ret	CHN; 16	JPN; 17	BRA; 16		26th	0
2007	Etihad Aldar Spyker F1 Team	Spyker F8-VII	Ferrari 056H 2.4 V8	AUS	MAL	BHR	ESP	MON	CAN	USA	FRA	GBR	EUR	HUN; Ret	TUR; 20								24th	0
2007	Etihad Aldar Spyker F1 Team	Spyker F8-VIIB	Ferrari 056H 2.4 V8													ITA; 20	BEL; 17	JPN; 12	CHN; 17	BRA; Ret			24th	0
2010	Hispania Racing F1 Team	Hispania F110	Cosworth CA2010 2.4 V8	BHR	AUS	MAL	CHN	ESP	MON	TUR; TD	CAN	EUR	GBR; 20	GER; Ret	HUN; 19	BEL; 20	ITA; 19	SIN	JPN; 16	KOR; 15	BRA	ABU	26th	0

=== Complete GP2 Series results ===
(key) (Races in bold indicate pole position) (Races in italics indicate fastest lap)

Year	Entrant	1	2	3	4	5	6	7	8	9	10	11	12	13	14	15	16	17	18	19	20	21	DC	Points
2007	BCN Competición	BHR; FEA; 11	BHR; SPR; 14	CAT; FEA; 9	CAT; SPR; 18†	MON; FEA; Ret	MAG; FEA; 11	MAG; SPR; 13	SIL; FEA; 16	SIL; SPR; Ret	NÜR; FEA; 13	NÜR; SPR; 11	HUN; FEA	HUN; SPR	IST; FEA	IST; SPR	MNZ; FEA	MNZ; SPR	SPA; FEA	SPA; SPR	VAL; FEA	VAL; SPR	30th	0
2008	ART Grand Prix	CAT; FEA	CAT; SPR	IST; FEA	IST; SPR	MON; FEA	MON; SPR	MAG; FEA	MAG; SPR	SIL; FEA	SIL; SPR	HOC; FEA; 12†	HOC; SPR; NC	HUN; FEA; 10	HUN; SPR; 4	VAL; FEA; Ret	VAL; SPR; Ret	SPA; FEA; 18	SPA; SPR; Ret	MNZ; FEA; Ret	MNZ; SPR; Ret		23rd	3

==== Complete GP2 Asia Series results ====
(key) (Races in bold indicate pole position) (Races in italics indicate fastest lap)

Year	Entrant	1	2	3	4	5	6	7	8	9	10	11	12	DC	Points
2008–09	ART Grand Prix	SHI; FEA; 3	SHI; SPR; 14	DUB; FEA; 8	DUB; SPR; C	BHR; FEA; 17	BHR; SPR; 11	LSL; FEA; Ret	LSL; SPR; 14	SEP; FEA; 12	SEP; SPR; Ret	BHR; FEA; 6	BHR; SPR; 4	9th	13

=== Complete ADAC GT Masters results ===
(key) (Races in bold indicate pole position) (Races in italics indicate fastest lap)

Year	Entrant	Car	1	2	3	4	5	6	7	8	9	10	11	12	13	14	DC	Points
2009	Team Rosberg	Audi R8 LMS	OSC; 1; 12	OSC; 2; 14	ASS; 1; 9	ASS; 2 Ret	HOC; 1; 8	HOC; 2 Ret	LAU; 1 Ret	LAU; 2; 14	NÜR; 1; 18	NÜR; 2; 18	SAC; 1 Ret	SAC; 2 DNS	OSC; 1; 14	OSC; 2; 12	32nd	1

=== Complete Formula E results ===
(key) (Races in bold indicate pole position; races in italics indicate fastest lap)

Year	Team	Chassis	Powertrain	1	2	3	4	5	6	7	8	9	10	11	Pos	Points
2014–15	Amlin Aguri	Spark SRT01-e	SRT01-e	BEI	PUT	PDE	BUE	MIA	LBH	MCO	BER	MSC	LDN; Ret	LDN; Ret	35th	0

=== Complete Super Formula Lights results ===
(key) (Races in bold indicate pole position) (Races in italics indicate fastest lap)

Year	Entrant	Engine	1	2	3	4	5	6	7	8	9	10	11	12	13	14	15	16	17	DC	Points
2020	B-Max Racing Team	Spiess A41	MOT; 1	MOT; 2	MOT; 3	OKA; 1	OKA; 2	SUG; 1	SUG; 2	SUG; 3	AUT; 1	AUT; 2	AUT; 3	SUZ; 1	SUZ; 2	SUZ; 3	FUJ; 1; 12	FUJ; 2; 8	FUJ; 3; 7	16th	0
