= HRT Formula 1 Team =

Former Spanish Formula 1 Team

HRT
- Full name: HRT Formula 1 Team (2011–2012); Hispania Racing F1 Team (2010–2011); Campos Meta 1 (2009)
- Base: Madrid, Spain
- Founder(s): Adrián Campos; José Ramón Carabante
- Noted staff: Colin Kolles; Geoff Willis; Luis Pérez-Sala; Daniele Audetto; Toni Cuquerella
- Noted drivers: (India) Karun Chandhok (Austria) Christian Klien (Brazil) Bruno Senna (India) Narain Karthikeyan (Australia) Daniel Ricciardo (Italy) Vitantonio Liuzzi (Spain) Pedro de la Rosa (Japan) Sakon Yamamoto

Formula One World Championship career
- First entry: 2010 Bahrain Grand Prix
- Races entered: 58 (56 starts)
- Engines: Cosworth
- Constructors' Championships: 0
- Drivers' Championships: 0
- Race victories: 0
- Podiums: 0
- Points: 0
- Pole positions: 0
- Fastest laps: 0
- Final entry: 2012 Brazilian Grand Prix

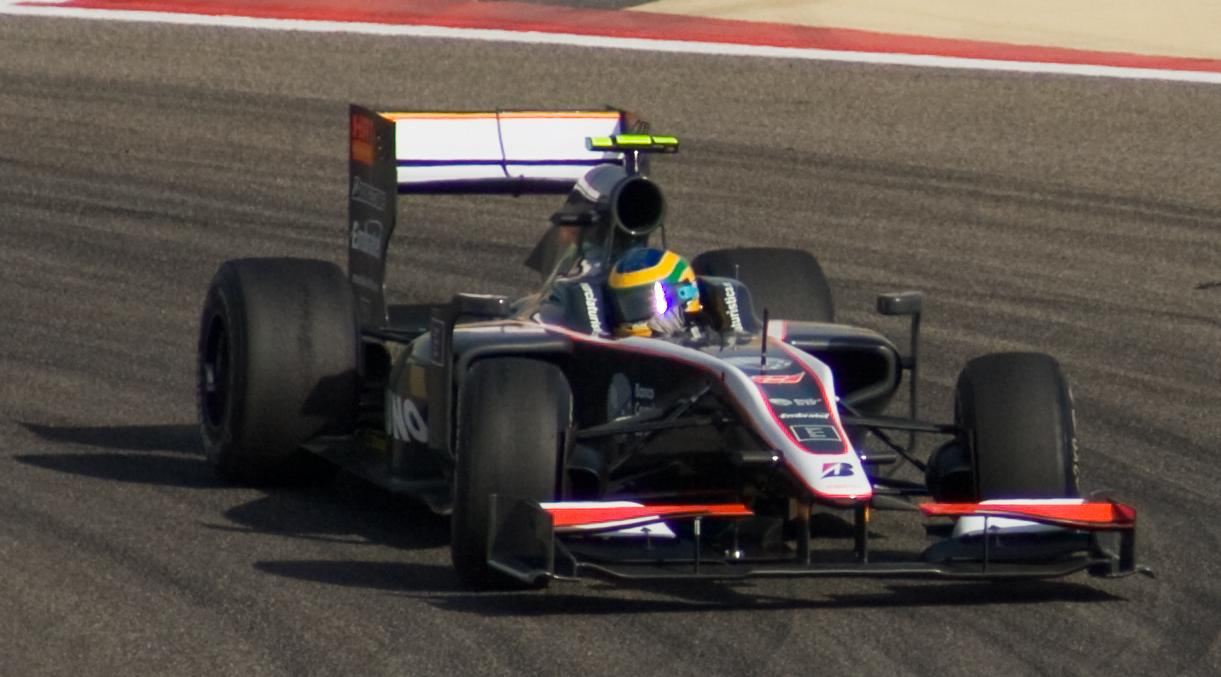
Bruno Senna completed 17 laps of the 2010 Bahrain Grand Prix before retiring with an overheating engine.

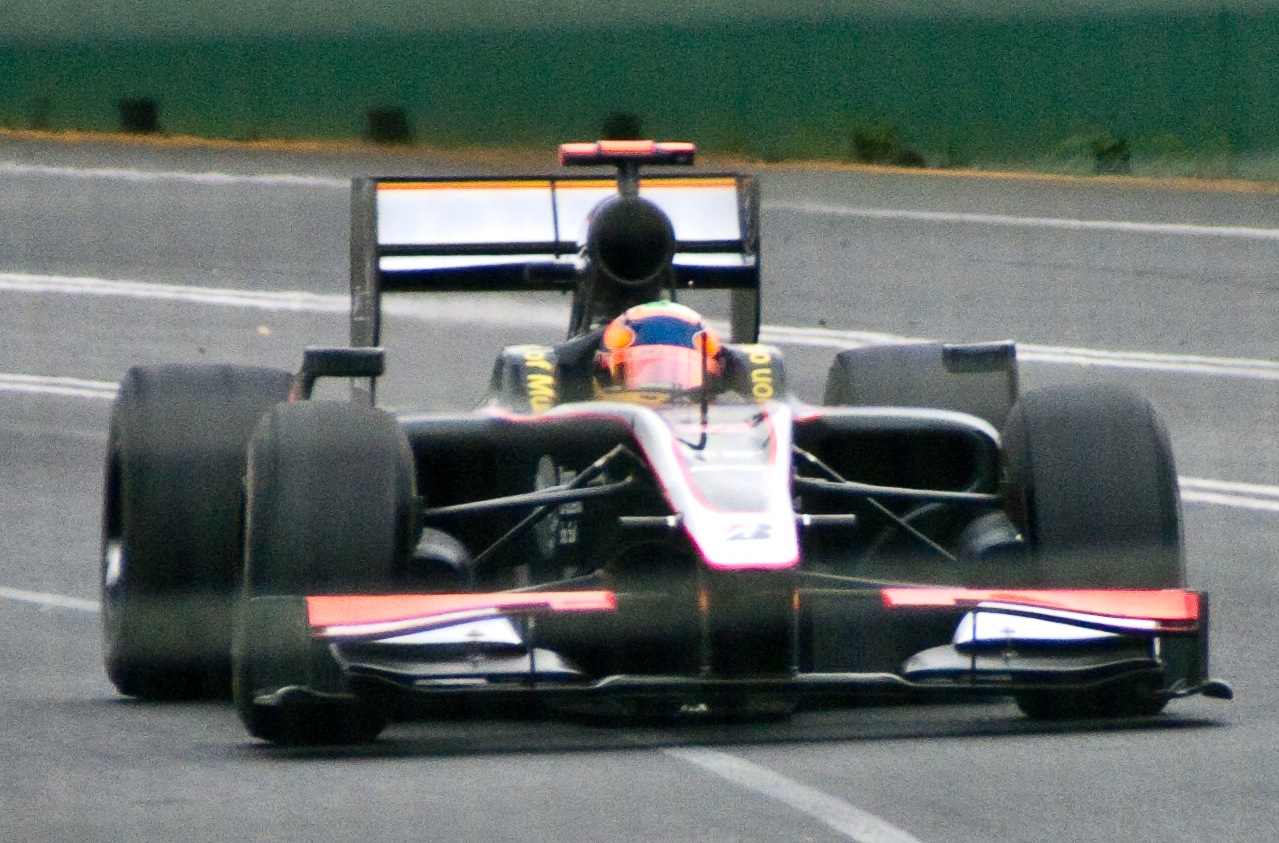
Karun Chandhok recorded Hispania Racing's first finish with fourteenth position at the Australian Grand Prix.

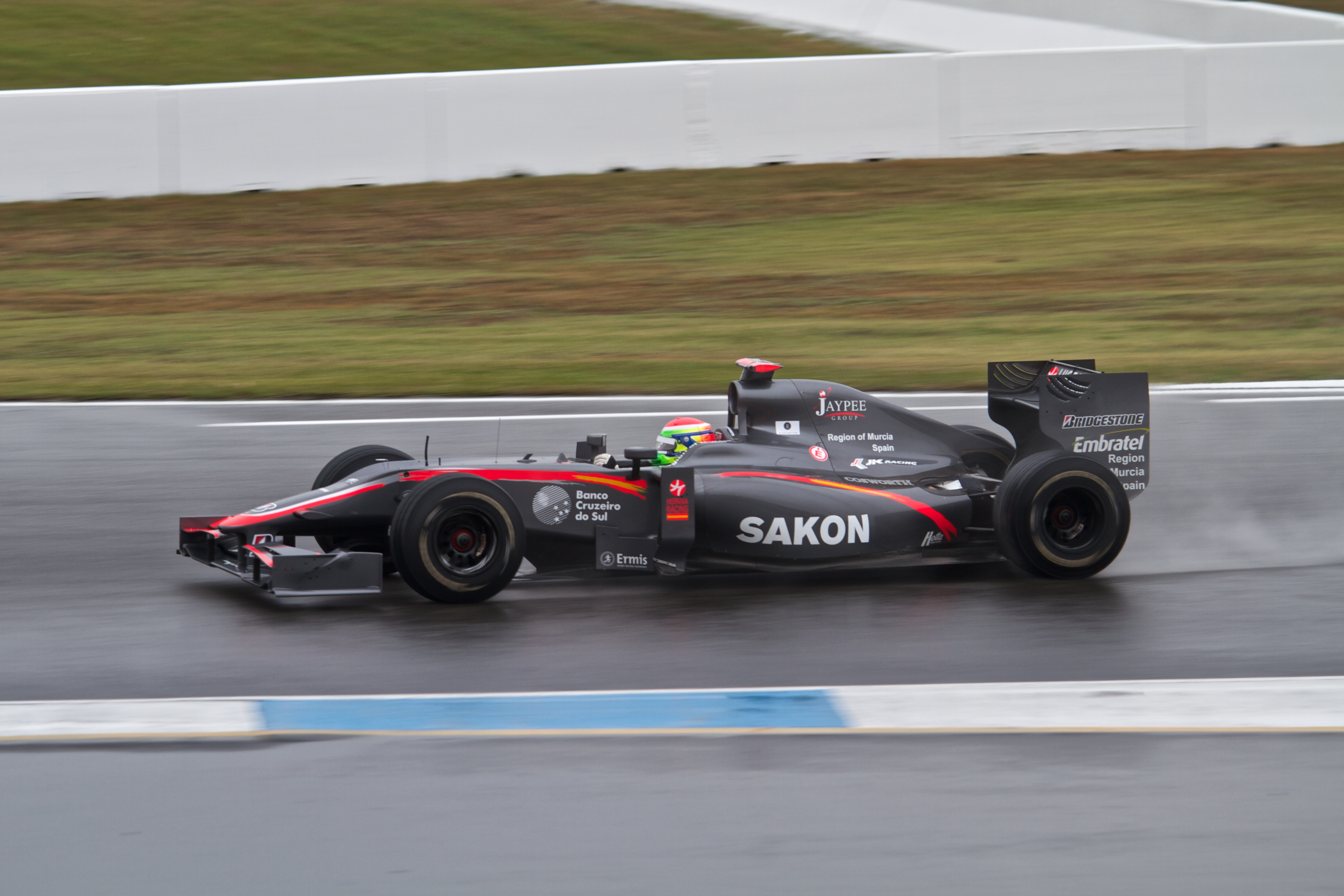
Sakon Yamamoto replaced Chandhok for the 2010 German Grand Prix.

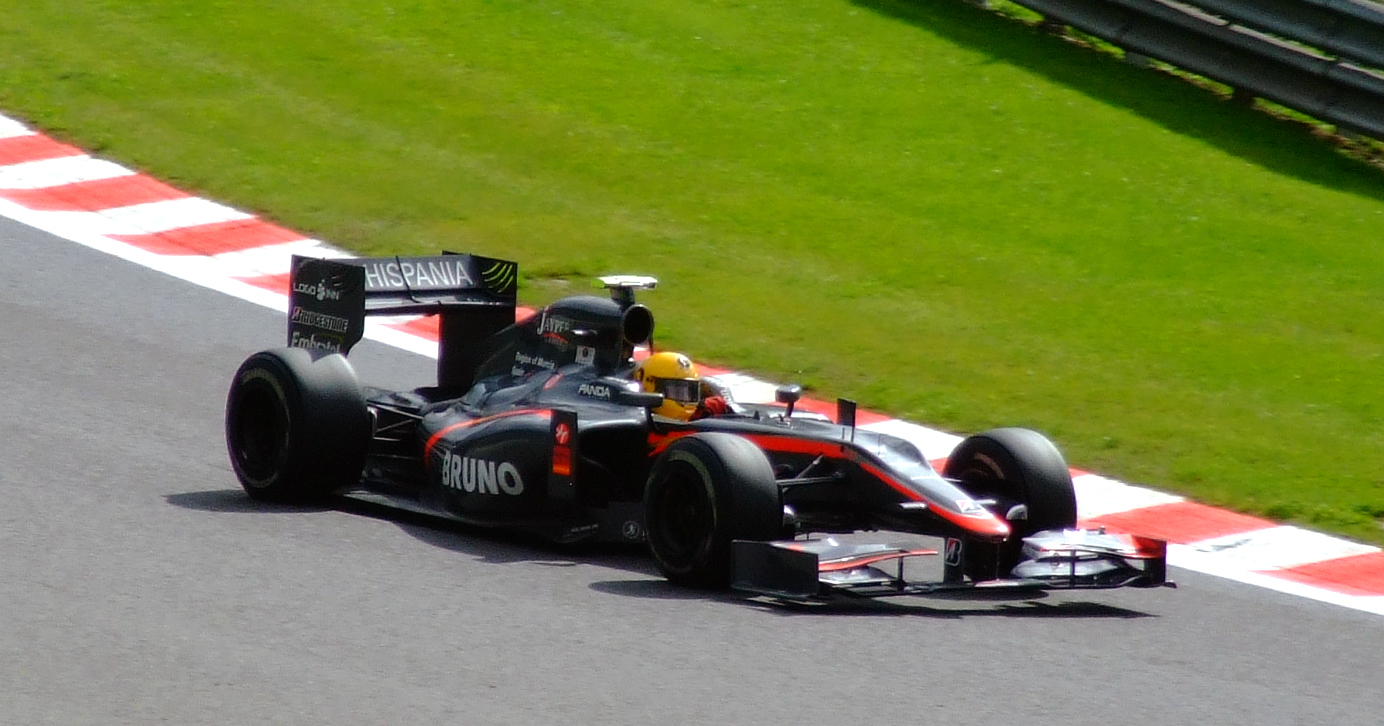
Bruno Senna continued to drive for the rest of the season after missing the 2010 British Grand Prix. He is seen here at the 2010 Belgian Grand Prix.

HRT Formula 1 Team, formerly known as Campos Meta 1 and Hispania Racing, was a Spanish Formula One team founded by former driver Adrián Campos. It was sold to José Ramón Carabante before its debut in 2010, and then to investment group Thesan Capital in July 2011. It was the first Spanish team to race in Formula One; a previous effort known as "Bravo F1" failed to enter the sport in 1993.

In November 2012, HRT's owners announced that they were looking to sell the team. When they were unable to find a buyer before the deadline of 30 November, the team was subsequently omitted from the 2013 entry list.

== History ==
=== Formation ===
The team began as a collaboration between Adrián Campos of Campos Racing and Enrique Rodríguez of Meta Image, under the name of Campos Meta. At the time, Campos Racing was running a team in the European F3 Open Championship and had formerly run the GP2 Series team subsequently known as Addax Team. Campos was running the Formula One operation in conjunction with Meta Image, a Madrid-based sports agency, who managed one of Campos' F3 Open drivers at the time, Bruno Méndez. Campos and Rodríguez began looking at the possibility of creating Spain's first Formula One team in February 2009. In March, the team gained shareholders such as Spanish businessman José Ramón Carabante and basketball players Pau Gasol and Jorge Garbajosa.

The team's headquarters were originally located at Meta Images's offices in Madrid, housing marketing and administration, while its technical centre is located at Campos Racing's headquarters in Alzira, Valencia. In October 2009 the team completed a deal with the local government of the Region of Murcia to build new facilities for the team at the Parque Tecnológico Fuente Álamo science park. Italian constructor Dallara built the 2010 cars in Parma, which used Cosworth engines.

On 12 June, Campos Meta were named by the FIA as one of three new teams granted entry to the 2010 season, along with US F1 Team and Manor Grand Prix.

On the weekend of the 2009 Abu Dhabi Grand Prix, Campos confirmed that Bruno Senna, the nephew of former world champion Ayrton Senna, would be one of their racing drivers for 2010.

=== Financial struggles and rebranding ===
On 22 December 2009, Bernie Ecclestone voiced concerns about the team's ability to be on the grid for the first race of the 2010 F1 season. In January 2010, A1 Grand Prix principal Tony Teixeira was one of several potential investors linked to the team in an effort to open up a revenue stream in the build-up to the 2010 testing season. Teixeira, who had previously been rumoured as a potential buyer of Honda at the end of 2008 has stated his intentions to make Campos the Formula One "arm" of the struggling A1 Grand Prix series. On 27 January, the team admitted that they may not be able to participate in the 2010 winter testing season at all and that their second driver may not be announced until the eve of their first race. Despite this admission, Teixeira claimed the team was aiming to make the second test session and believed that they would "definitely" make the third session at Jerez. However, it was reported in early February that Teixeira's proposed buy-out of the team was being met with resistance from the established teams.

On 5 February 2010, Campos boss Adrián Campos told BBC Sport that the team were struggling to find funding. It was paying the €7 million to Dallara stating that "sometime we have the money sometime we don't". He confirmed that the funding should be finalised and within place the following week. He also denied the fact that F1-hopefuls Stefan GP had taken the Campos' car stating that "we've got a contract and as long as we're paying the contract is valid". Later in February, speculation began to spread as to whether Campos would actually make the 2010 field, and the team admitted budgetary problems.

On 19 February, it was announced that majority shareholder José Ramón Carabante had taken over full control of the team from Adrián Campos, who was also replaced as team principal by Colin Kolles. The team was renamed to Hispania Racing F1 Team (HRT) ahead of their first race, with the name taken from Grupo Hispania, one of Carabante's companies. The team's headquarters were moved from Meta Image's offices in Madrid to Grupo Hispania's offices in Murcia. On 4 March, Karun Chandhok was confirmed as the team's second driver. The team launched their Cosworth-powered, Dallara-designed car later the same day; it was called the F110.

=== 2010 season ===
With no pre-season testing, the F110 completed its first laps during the weekend of the 2010 Bahrain Grand Prix. Senna's car was completed in time for him to complete three installation laps in the first free practice session. In the second session, he completed 17 laps, setting a best time over 11 seconds off the pace, but slid off the road after completing his final lap due to one of his car's wheels coming loose. Senna described the day's work as a "great start", considering the team's lack of preparation. By contrast, the mechanics were unable to make the clutch and gearbox on Chandhok's car work, and he did not complete any laps on Friday. In qualifying, Senna and Chandhok set the 23rd and 24th-quickest times to share the back row of the starting grid: Chandhok was finally able to complete his car's first laps in anger and set a time 1.7 seconds slower than his team-mate, who was in turn just over eight seconds behind polesitter Sebastian Vettel. For the race, both cars started from the pit lane; Chandhok crashed out on the second lap and Senna retired on lap 18 with an overheating engine.

At the Australian Grand Prix, the cars again occupied the back row of the grid, with Senna ahead of Chandhok. The F110s were both 6.6 seconds off the polesitter's time, but only 0.34 seconds behind the Virgin of Lucas di Grassi. Senna's car only lasted four laps of the race before retiring with a hydraulic failure, but Chandhok finished 14th and last for the car's first classified finish, albeit five laps adrift of winner Jenson Button and three laps behind Heikki Kovalainen's 13th-placed Lotus. This was partly due to a damaged floor caused by Chandhok coming off the track twice during the race.

Hispania recorded its first double finish at the Malaysian Grand Prix with Chandhok finishing in front of Senna, albeit 3 and 4 laps down respectively. The team repeated this feat at the Chinese Grand Prix with Senna in 16th and Chandhok 17th, the last of the cars still running.

The fifth start in Spain wasn't so successful for both Hispania drivers. Senna retired in the first corner after an accident, Chandhok remained on the track for 30 laps, then retired with a broken suspension. However the team's new test driver Christian Klien drove for the team in first practice.

Hispania started well in Monaco, leapfrogging their rivals (Lotus and Virgin) at the start of the race. Senna later retired, but Chandhok was looking set to finish until he was involved in a frightening accident with Jarno Trulli who, when trying to overtake Chandhok, hit the side of the Hispania car and was sent over the top of it and into the barrier. Both drivers were unhurt. The crash almost cost Mark Webber the race win as he was following the pair closely when the accident occurred.

In Turkey, the team's other test driver Sakon Yamamoto completed the first practice session, setting the slowest time of the session.

On the eve of the British Grand Prix at Silverstone, Hispania announced that Bruno Senna had been dropped for the race, and that test driver Sakon Yamamoto would take his place. However, it was announced that Senna would race after Silverstone, saying that they "want to confirm that Bruno Senna has all the support of the Spanish team" and "that he remains one of the Hispania Racing HRT F1 team's official drivers and that he will be continuing to drive in the remaining races." Yamamoto replaced Chandhok for the next four races, before being replaced by Christian Klien for the Singapore Grand Prix due to food poisoning. Yamamoto returned for the following two races, but was again replaced by Klien for the final two races of the season.

In 2020, Chandhok claimed that the battle between Campos and Dallara over the chassis payment led to the teams' launch car being raced all season without any upgrades. As a result, the only alteration made to the cars all year was the movement of side-mirrors inboard ahead of a sidepod-mirror ban in China.

=== 2011 season ===
Hispania parted company with Dallara in May 2010 after the partnership between the two companies had become tense due to the car's lack of performance. The team sought an alternative technical deal to assist in the construction of its 2011 chassis. When Hispania was still under the Campos name, team owner José Ramón Carabante said in an interview with Autosport that Campos Meta F1/HRT were eyeing a Ferrari engine supply for the 2011 season. Colin Kolles said in an interview with Diario AS in July 2010, that talks about a partnership with Toyota was an option for 2011. Kolles confirmed in October that the team had enough financing to complete its maiden Formula One campaign.

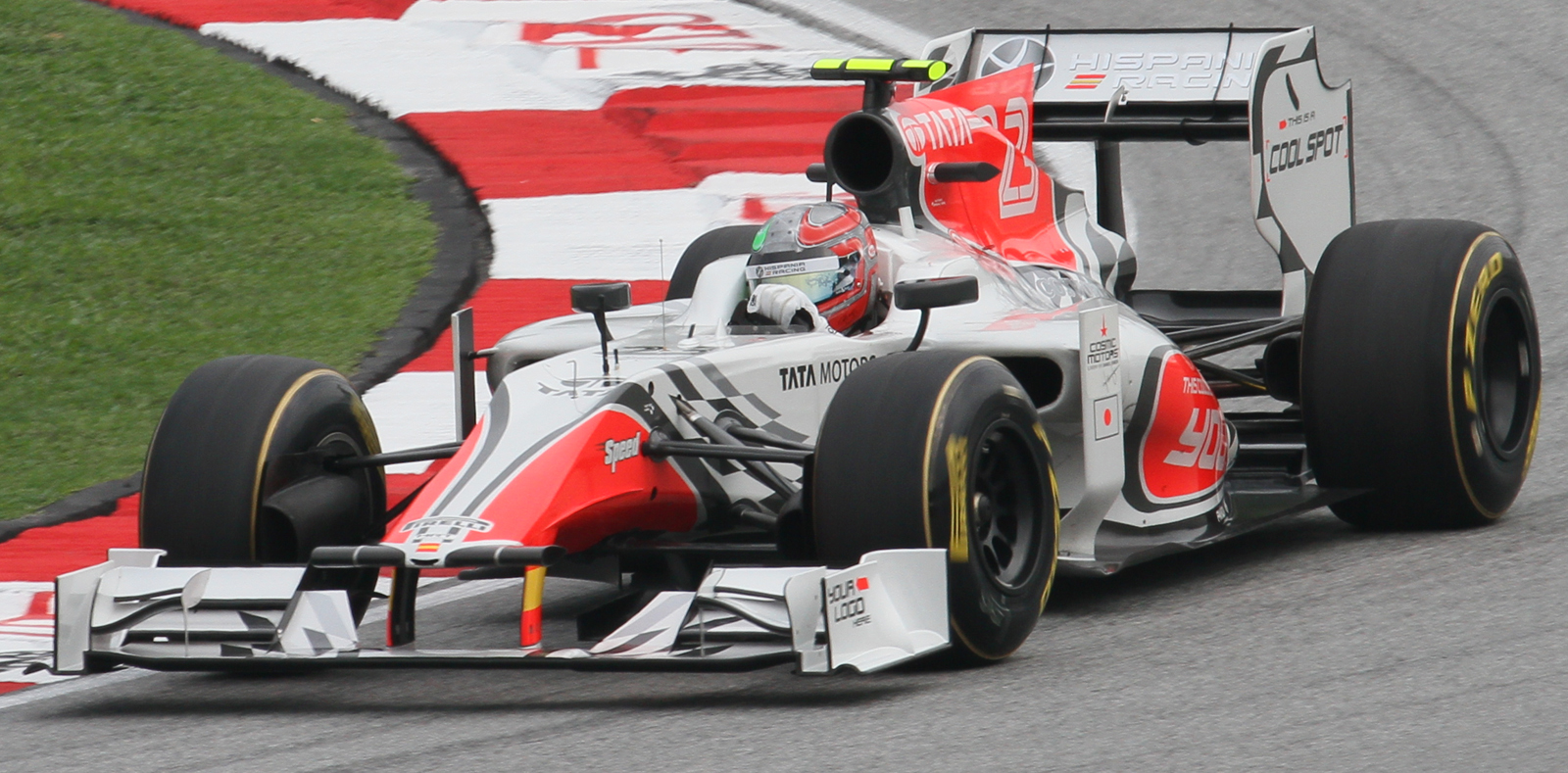
Vitantonio Liuzzi qualifying at the 2011 Malaysian Grand Prix

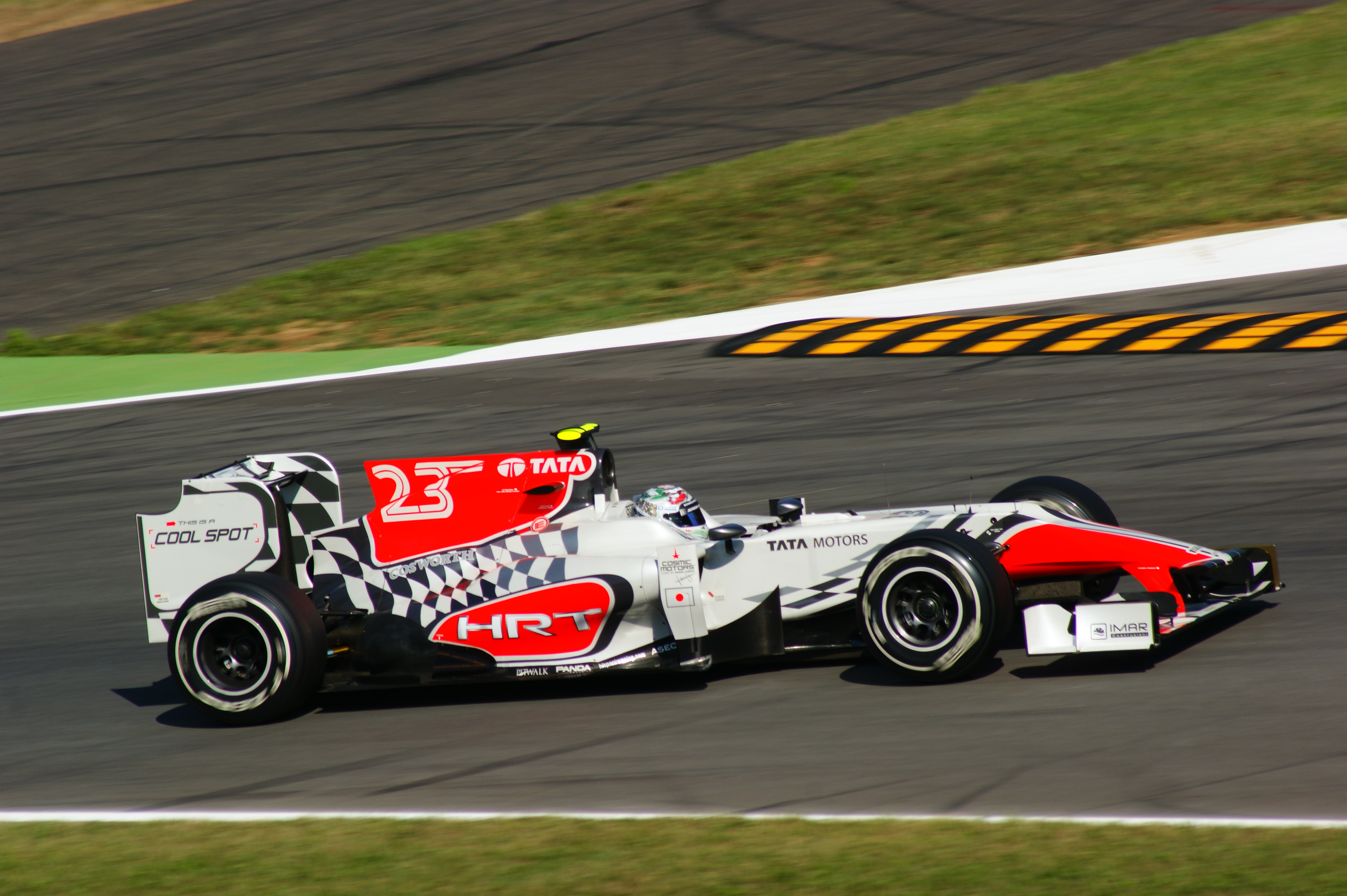
Vitantonio Liuzzi driving at the 2011 Italian Grand Prix

Former chief executive officer of Telefónica, Juan Villalonga joined the team in November 2010. His main role is to help with communications, technology and sponsorship. It was later announced that the team would give a test to GP2 champion Pastor Maldonado who later secured a drive with Williams. Fellow GP2 drivers Josef Král and Davide Valsecchi also tested for the team in Abu Dhabi. After the final race of the 2010 season, it emerged that Hispania had signed a deal in the summer of 2010 with Toyota Motorsport GmBH which would have seen it use Toyota's never-raced 2010 car, the Toyota TF110, as the basis of its 2011 challenger as well as making use of Toyota Motorsport's technical resources. In November 2010, Toyota announced that they had cancelled the agreement because HRT failed to make payments. In December 2010 there were reports that the team has been placed up for sale, but had been denied by its owners. Hispania also left the Formula One Teams Association at this point, blaming the organisation's bias against the smaller teams for its decision. The FOTA secretary-general, however, claimed that Hispania was expelled from the organisation because it did not pay its 2010 membership fee.

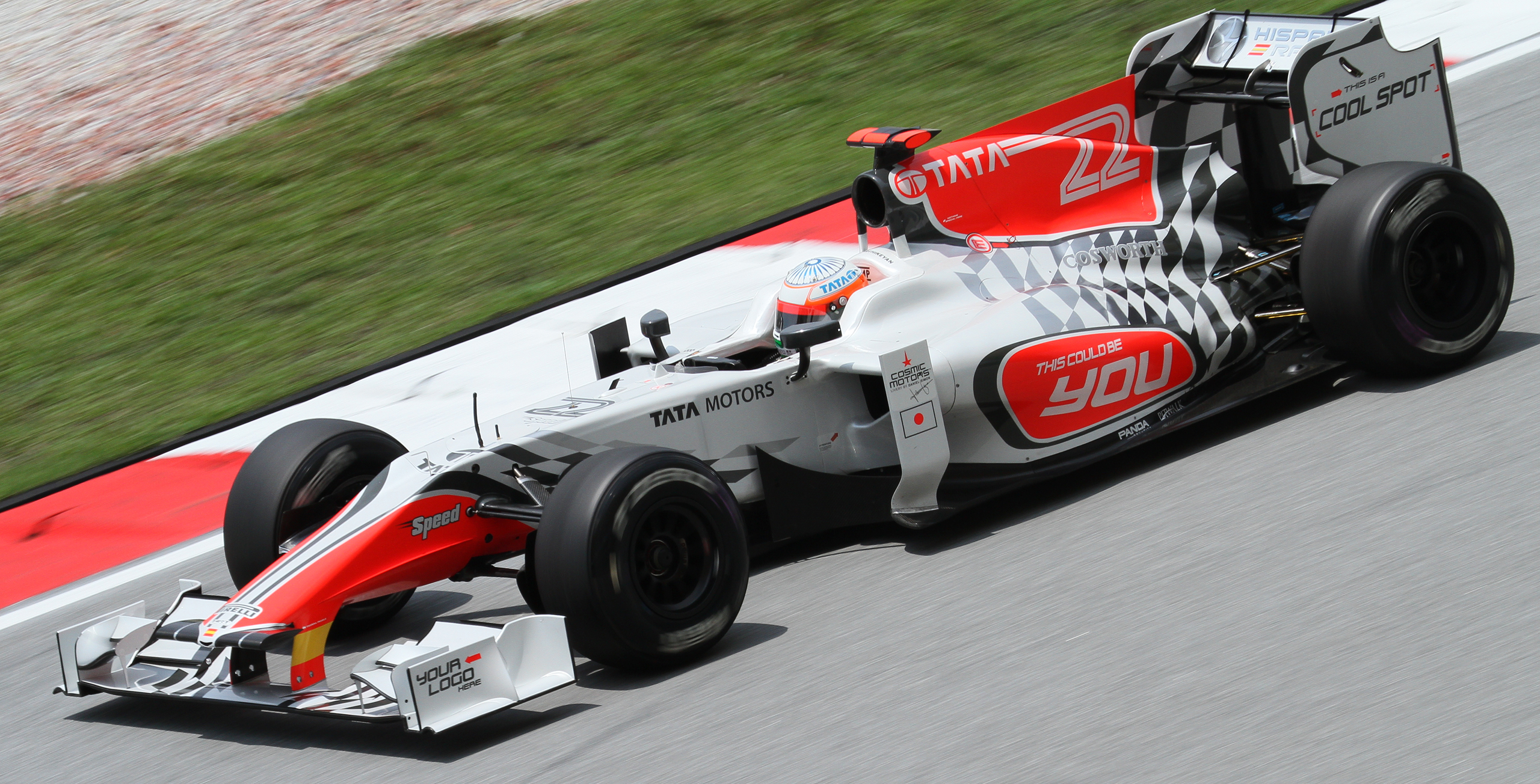
Narain Karthikeyan (pictured) and Vitantonio Liuzzi joined the team for the 2011 season.

On 6 January, Narain Karthikeyan announced that he would drive for Hispania in the 2011 season. He previously drove for the Jordan team in 2005. By February, it had emerged that the team was considering Vitantonio Liuzzi as an option for their second driver. Liuzzi confirmed that it was in consideration and took part in the third pre-season test with the team, in Barcelona. The team also tested former Formula Renault V6 Eurocup champion Giorgio Mondini at Barcelona. Liuzzi was confirmed as Hispania's second driver on 9 March 2011.

The team's 2011 car, the Hispania F111 made its debut during the second practice session of the Australian Grand Prix, with Vitantonio Liuzzi completing an installation lap three minutes before the end of the session. The 2011 season saw the re-introduction of the 107% rule, and in qualifying, both drivers failed to score a time under the 107% of the pole. In Malaysia, the team showed improved pace, with Liuzzi only half a second from the slowest of the Virgin cars. Both cars were within 107% of the polesitter's time, and were thus able to take the start of the race. However both cars retired with technical problems. In China, Liuzzi and Karthikeyan qualified again, and completed the race as the last two classified finishers in 22nd and 23rd respectively.

In Turkey, Liuzzi started the race in front of both Virgins, but finished 22nd thanks to brake problems, with Karthikeyan in 21st. Spain saw both cars starting ahead of Jérôme d'Ambrosio, but meanwhile Karthikeyan finished 21st, Liuzzi retired with gearbox problems; in Monaco, both drivers crashed in practice and did not enter qualifying, but were allowed to start the race by the stewards. Liuzzi finished 16th and Karthikeyan 17th, taking advantage of multiple retirements. In Canada, the team achieved their best result with both drivers finishing in 13th and 14th positions, placing them ahead of Virgin in the Constructors' Championship. However, Karthikeyan was hit with a post race penalty for cutting a chicane during the race, which dropped him to 17th place. At Valencia, Liuzzi and Karthikeyan finished 23rd and 24th.

On 4 July 2011, it was announced that Thesan Capital, a Madrid-based investment company purchased a controlling stake in the team from owner Jose Ramon Carabante. Thesan Capital announced the team's operations would continue as they had before the purchase, and that they had no plans to change the team name or alter its operational structure. In a statement released to the media, Thesan Capital described their intentions as making the team "more Spanish" and settling the team within Spain.

For the British Grand Prix, Karthikeyan was replaced by Red Bull protégé Daniel Ricciardo. He qualified 24th with Liuzzi in 23rd, and they finished 19th and 18th respectively. Ricciardo again finished 19th in Germany, while Liuzzi retired. In Hungary, Liuzzi finished 20th and Ricciardo 18th. Despite not setting a time within 107% of the best time in Q1, both cars were allowed to race in Belgium. Liuzzi finished 19th and Ricciardo retired with a vibration in his car. In Italy, Liuzzi lost control at the start after making contact with Kovalainen, slid across the grass, cut the first corner and slammed sideways in to Vitaly Petrov and Nico Rosberg, taking all three out of the race.

On 22 October 2011, a few days before the inaugural Indian Grand Prix, Hispania announced that Karthikeyan would drive in place of Liuzzi rather than Ricciardo. Despite picking up damage in the first lap of the race, Karthikeyan managed to beat Ricciardo by 31.8 seconds in the race to finish 17th. Liuzzi returned to replace Karthikeyan for the final two races.

Hispania finished 11th in the World Constructors' Championship, ahead of Virgin.

=== 2012 season ===
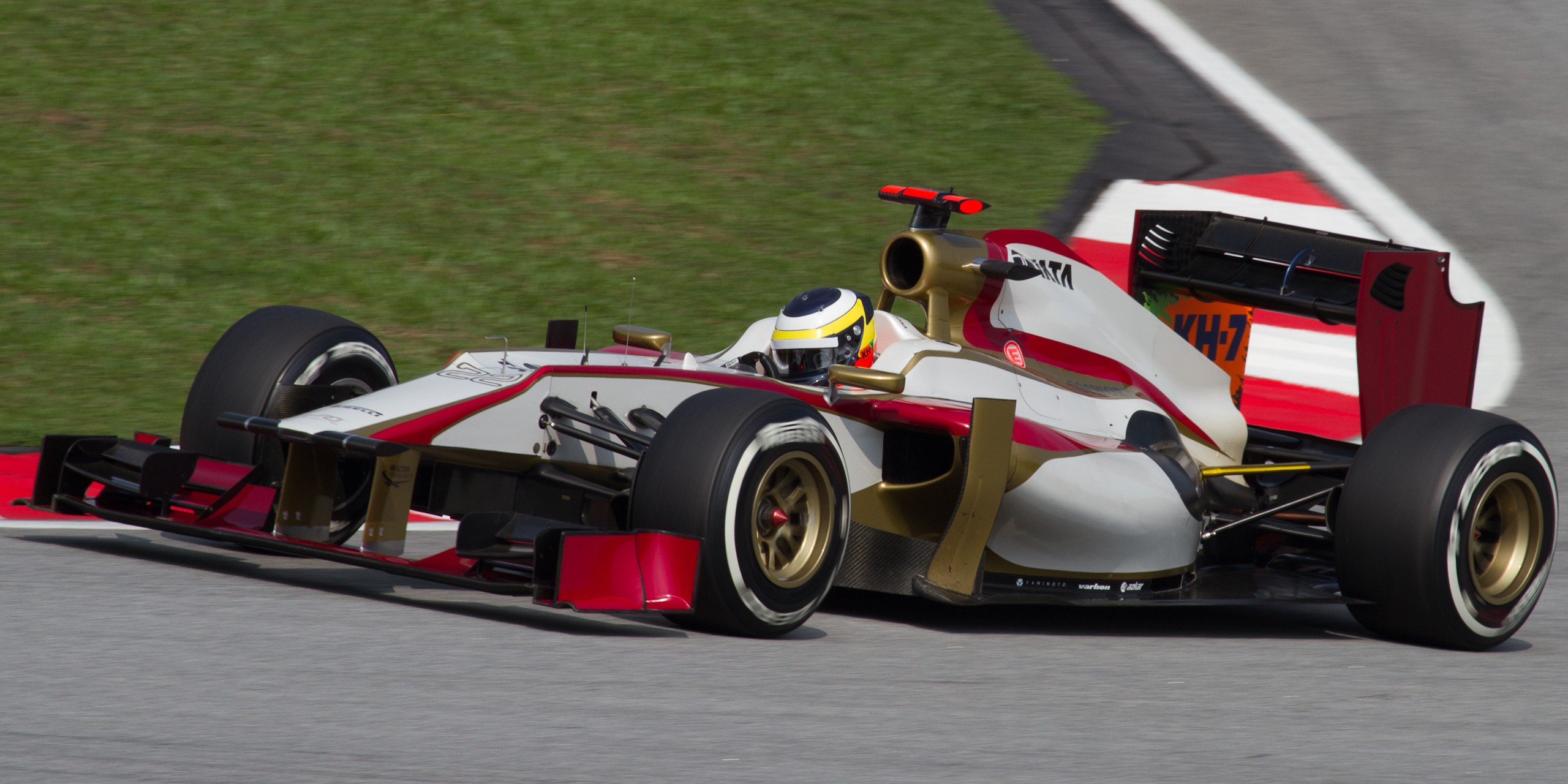
Pedro de la Rosa in qualifying for the 2012 Malaysian Grand Prix.

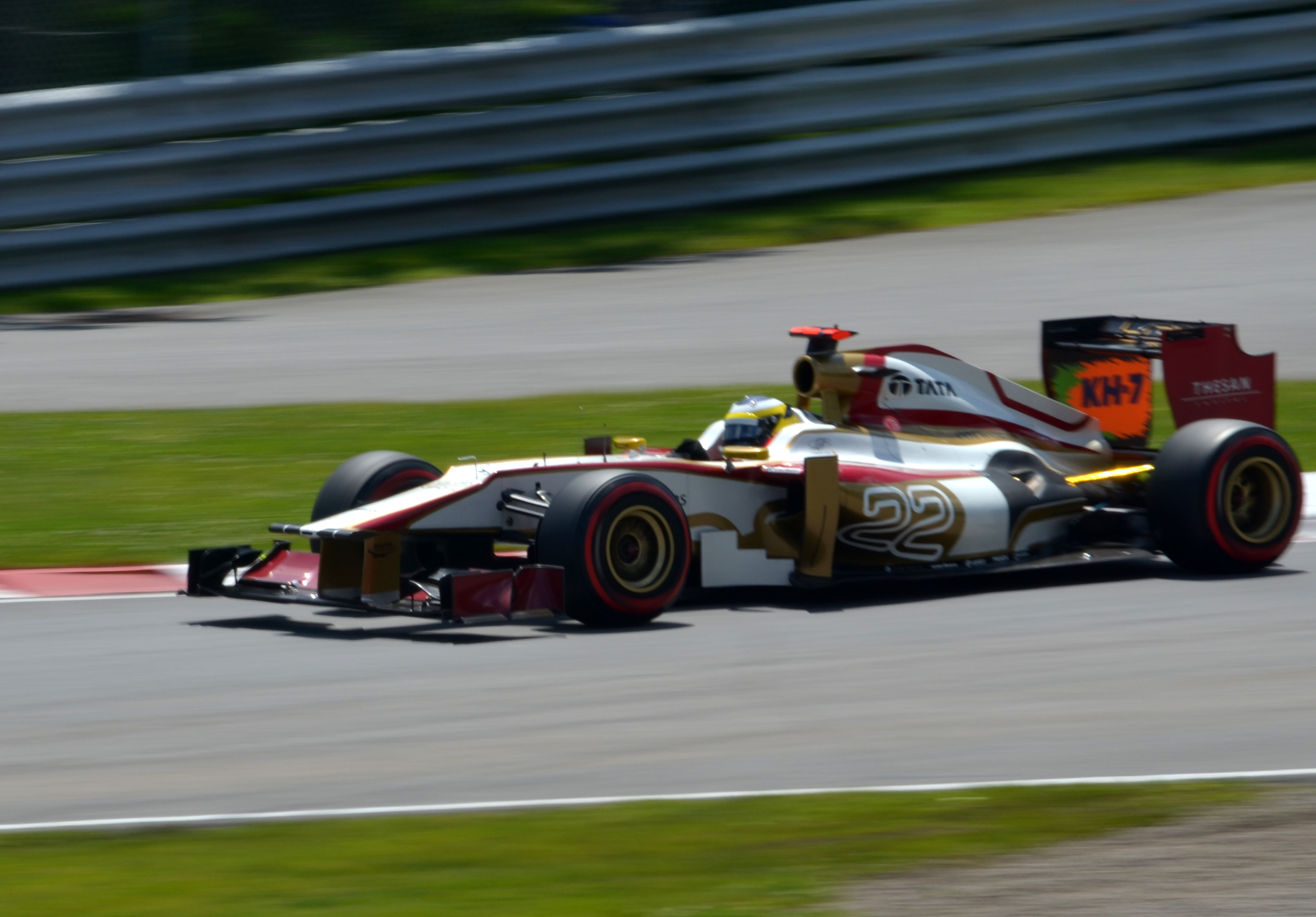
De la Rosa driving the F112 with revised livery at the 2012 Canadian Grand Prix.

On 21 November 2011, it was announced that Pedro de la Rosa had signed for the team on a two-year contract. On 14 December 2011, the team announced that team principal Colin Kolles was leaving, effective from the following day, "due to the new direction that the team has taken and the decision of the new management to move the team headquarters to Spain". He was replaced by Luis Pérez-Sala.

In February 2012 it was announced that the team would move its operations to the Caja Mágica complex in Madrid, using 11,000 square metres. The team's car, the F112, was originally scheduled to complete its first running during the second pre-season test in Barcelona in late February, but was delayed due to the car failing mandatory crash tests. At the Australian Grand Prix, de la Rosa and Karthikeyan were not permitted to race, as both drivers failed to set a lap time within 107% of the fastest time in the first part of qualifying. On 12 November 2012, the team's owner Thesan Capital confirmed that they were in talks with several parties in regard to the sale of the Spanish outfit.

=== Team closure ===
In November 2012, the owners of HRT F1 announced that they were putting the team up for sale. The team needed to find a buyer by 30 November – the date by which entry fees for the 2013 were due to be paid – or else face closure and a departure from the sport. HRT failed to find a buyer in time, and the team was omitted from the 2013 entry list. They were later reported to be in liquidation. Despite bids to purchase and revive the team under a new name, their assets were ultimately sold to Teo Martín, owner of a firm specialising in recycling automotive parts. Martín intends to race the cars in the EuroBOSS Series.

Czech driver Josef Král later stated that he had signed a contract to race for the Spanish team if it had made the grid for 2013.

== Complete Formula One results ==
(key) (results in bold indicate pole position; races in italics indicate fastest lap)

Year	Chassis	Engine	Tyres	Drivers	1	2	3	4	5	6	7	8	9	10	11	12	13	14	15	16	17	18	19	20	Points	WCC
2010	F110	Cosworth CA2010 2.4 V8	B		BHR	AUS	MAL	CHN	ESP	MON	TUR	CAN	EUR	GBR	GER	HUN	BEL	ITA	SIN	JPN	KOR	BRA	ABU		0	11th
2010	F110	Cosworth CA2010 2.4 V8	B	(India) Karun Chandhok	Ret	14	15	17	Ret	14^{†}	20^{†}	18	18	19											0	11th
2010	F110	Cosworth CA2010 2.4 V8	B	(Brazil) Bruno Senna	Ret	Ret	16	16	Ret	Ret	Ret	Ret	20		19	17	Ret	Ret	Ret	15	14	21	19		0	11th
2010	F110	Cosworth CA2010 2.4 V8	B	(Japan) Sakon Yamamoto										20	Ret	19	20	19		16	15				0	11th
2010	F110	Cosworth CA2010 2.4 V8	B	(Austria) Christian Klien															Ret			22	20		0	11th
2011	F111	Cosworth CA2011 2.4 V8	P		AUS	MAL	CHN	TUR	ESP	MON	CAN	EUR	GBR	GER	HUN	BEL	ITA	SIN	JPN	KOR	IND	ABU	BRA		0	11th
2011	F111	Cosworth CA2011 2.4 V8	P	(India) Narain Karthikeyan	DNQ	Ret	23	21	21	17	17	24									17				0	11th
2011	F111	Cosworth CA2011 2.4 V8	P	(Australia) Daniel Ricciardo									19	19	18	Ret	NC	19	22	19	18	Ret	20		0	11th
2011	F111	Cosworth CA2011 2.4 V8	P	(Italy) Vitantonio Liuzzi	DNQ	Ret	22	22	Ret	16	13	23	18	Ret	20	19	Ret	20	23	21		20	Ret		0	11th
2012	F112	Cosworth CA2012 2.4 V8	P		AUS	MAL	CHN	BHR	ESP	MON	CAN	EUR	GBR	GER	HUN	BEL	ITA	SIN	JPN	KOR	IND	ABU	USA	BRA	0	12th
2012	F112	Cosworth CA2012 2.4 V8	P	(Spain) Pedro de la Rosa	DNQ	21	21	20	19	Ret	Ret	17	20	21	22	18	18	17	18	Ret	Ret	17	21	17	0	12th
2012	F112	Cosworth CA2012 2.4 V8	P	(India) Narain Karthikeyan	DNQ	22	22	21	Ret	15	Ret	18	21	23	Ret	Ret	19	Ret	Ret	20	21	Ret	22	18	0	12th

Notes

- ^{†} – The driver did not finish the Grand Prix, but was classified, as he completed over 90% of the race distance.
