= 2010 Italian Grand Prix =

Race 14 of 19 in the 2010 Formula One World Championship
← Previous race	Next race →
- Autodromo Nazionale di Monza

Race details
- Date: 12 September 2010
- Official name: Formula 1 Gran Premio Santander d'Italia 2010
- Location: Autodromo Nazionale di Monza, Monza, Italy
- Course: Permanent racing facility
- Course length: 5.793 km (3.6 miles)
- Distance: 53 laps, 306.720 km (190.58 miles)
- Weather: Sunny

Pole position
Driver	(Spain) Fernando Alonso	Ferrari
- Time: 1:21.962

Fastest lap
Driver	(Spain) Fernando Alonso	Ferrari
- Time: 1:24.139 on lap 52

Podium
First	(Spain) Fernando Alonso	Ferrari
Second	(United Kingdom) Jenson Button	McLaren-Mercedes
Third	(Brazil) Felipe Massa	Ferrari

The 2010 Italian Grand Prix (formally the Formula 1 Gran Premio Santander d'Italia 2010) was the fourteenth round of the 2010 Formula One season. It was held in Autodromo Nazionale di Monza, Monza, Italy, on 12 September 2010. Ferrari's Fernando Alonso won the race from pole position, taking Ferrari's first win on home soil since 2006 and their last until 2019.

Webber managed to reclaim the championship lead again after losing it at the preceding Belgian Grand Prix, five points clear from the non-finishing Hamilton, while Alonso leapfrogged both Button and Vettel to claim third place in the championship following his third win of the season, one point ahead of Button and a further two ahead of Vettel. Red Bull maintained their lead in the Constructors' Championship, clearing second-placed McLaren by just three points.

== Report ==
=== Background ===
On the Wednesday before the race, Ferrari were summoned before the FIA World Motor Sport Council to answer charges related to fixing a race outcome through the use of team orders – banned since 2003 under Article 39.1 of the sporting regulations following an infamous incident at the 2002 Austrian Grand Prix – and subsequently bringing the sport into disrepute at the German Grand Prix. Although Ferrari were fined US$100,000 at the time of the incident, the special meeting of the WMSC opened the door for further sanctions. The tribunal eventually decided against punishing the team further, with a promise to review the ban on team orders, a decision that was received negatively by fans.

Following increased speculation over Red Bull and Ferrari appearing to use flexible bodywork – banned under the sporting regulations – the FIA announced its intention to intensify testing procedures for the second time, having increased lateral load-bearing tests on the front wings at Spa-Francorchamps. Speculation within the Belgian paddock suggested that both teams had been using flexible floors to lower the front wings closer to the roadway, giving rise to the FIA's plan for stricter testing at Monza. On the Wednesday before the race, McLaren admitted to changing the floor of the MP4-25 to meet the increased load tests.

Lewis Hamilton led the drivers' championship and Mark Webber went into this race 3 points behind, since Sebastian Vettel, Jenson Button and Fernando Alonso did not score in Belgium. They were over a race win behind Hamilton and Webber. Sakon Yamamoto took Karun Chandhok's seat again for the Italian Grand Prix.

=== Qualifying ===
KThe first qualifying session saw all six cars from the new teams knocked out, with Jarno Trulli in the Lotus leading among them in 18th. His teammate Heikki Kovalainen was 19th and then came Vitantonio Liuzzi, whose Force India had had technical issues. Timo Glock had originally been ahead of Liuzzi in his Virgin, but he was handed a five place grid penalty for changing his gearbox, putting him at the very back. Lucas di Grassi was 21st in the other Virgin ahead of Bruno Senna and Sakon Yamamoto in the HRTs.

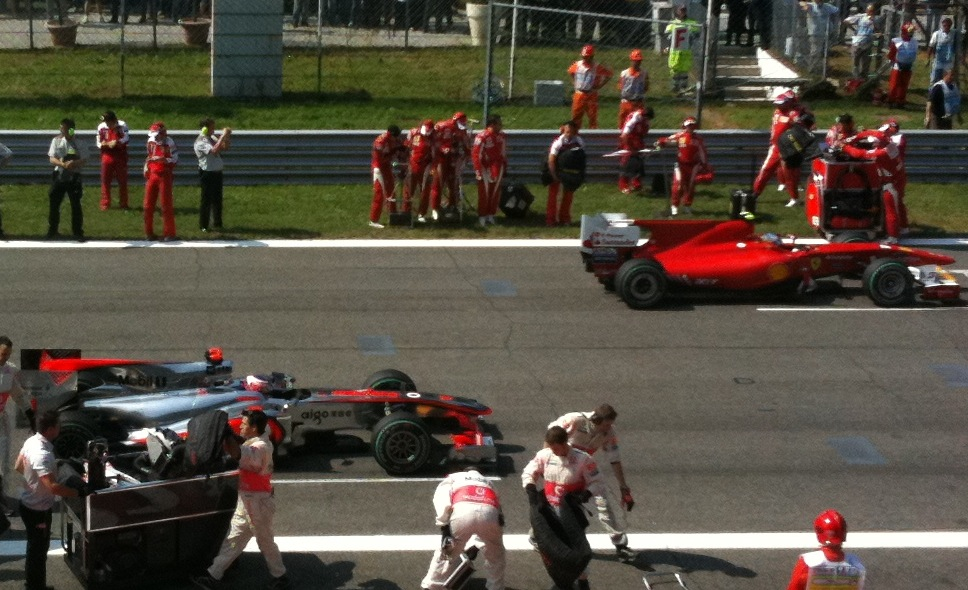
Fernando Alonso and Jenson Button started on the front row.

There were no real surprises in the second qualifying session either, as the two BMW Saubers of Kamui Kobayashi (13th) and Pedro de la Rosa (17th) were eliminated along with the Toro Rossos of Sébastien Buemi and Jaime Alguersuari, the Force India of Adrian Sutil and Michael Schumacher's Mercedes. Also eliminated was Vitaly Petrov, who qualified his Renault 15th but was given a five place grid drop for blocking Glock in the first session.

Rubens Barrichello scraped into the top 10 and qualified tenth in his Williams, just behind Robert Kubica in the other Renault. It was a good performance from the other Williams of Nico Hülkenberg, who out qualified his teammate to qualify eighth. Nico Rosberg was probably pleased with seventh in the Mercedes, but then came the championship contenders. A mistake put Sebastian Vettel sixth, and it was a tough day for his Red Bull team as Mark Webber could only qualify fourth in the sister RB6. The two McLarens of Lewis Hamilton and Jenson Button had chosen completely different car set ups, and it did not work out for Hamilton who could qualify only fifth. It was looking good for Ferrari in front of their home crowd, and Felipe Massa qualified third. It was their day as Button was pipped to pole by Fernando Alonso, the 19th pole of the Spaniard's career.

=== Race ===
At the start of the race, Jenson Button had a fantastic start, jumping his McLaren from second past Fernando Alonso's Ferrari. Alonso, who was alongside his teammate Felipe Massa through the turn one chicane, just clipped the rear of Button's diffuser, but there was only light damage to the McLaren. As the pack headed down to the second chicane of turns three and four, Button's teammate Lewis Hamilton, who was in fourth, tried to pull a move on Massa, but there was contact between the two. Although Lewis tried to carry on, the front track rod was broken and he pulled up at the next corner. Massa managed to carry on unscathed. Kamui Kobayashi did start the race but retired his BMW Sauber on the first lap with a gearbox failure.

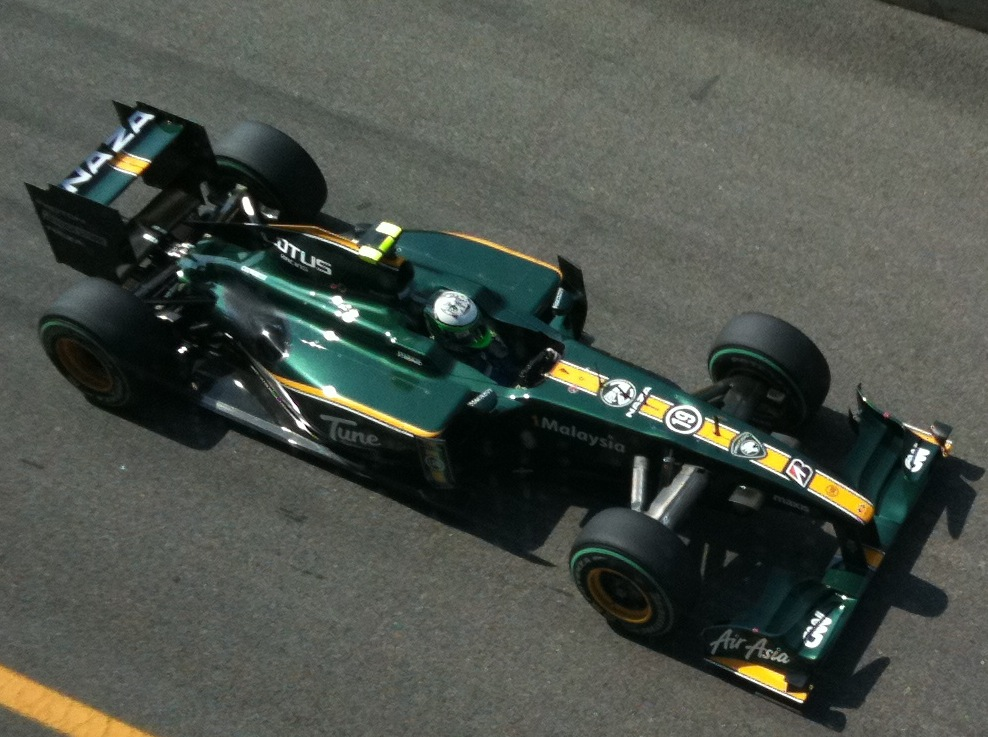
Heikki Kovalainen was slower than teammate Jarno Trulli for much of the weekend, and finished the race 18th.

Meanwhile, Mark Webber in the Red Bull was going backwards from his fourth place grid slot, and he was ninth at the end of the first lap. He soon re-passed Michael Schumacher's Mercedes at the second chicane on lap 6, with a calm and collected move on the seven times world champion. A hydraulic failure made Bruno Senna's HRT the race's third retirement on lap 11.

Alonso was harrying Button all the way, and drama occurred further back on lap 20 as Webber's teammate Sebastian Vettel, who had also had a bad start, dropping from 6th to 7th and was harrying Nico Hülkenberg in the Williams to take the place back, complained of an engine issue in the Red Bull's Renault power unit. Webber sailed past and Vettel was just dropping back into the clutches of compatriot Schumacher when he suddenly regained power, and began to close in on Hülkenberg and Webber.

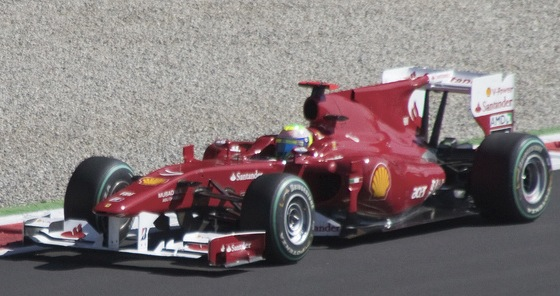
Felipe Massa finished third, days after Ferrari were spared any further sanction in relation to events at the German Grand Prix.

Button made his pit stop on lap 36, and by staying out for one lap longer Alonso rejoined ahead of Button after his stop, although his teammate Massa actually held 1st for two laps before his own pit-stop relegated him back to 3rd. It was very tight as Alonso exited the pits, but the Spaniard just managed to stay ahead by holding the racing line as the two were side by side through turns one and two. Jarno Trulli was the race's next retirement in the Lotus with a gearbox failure on lap 46.

After even more off track adventures for Hülkenberg, he was finally passed by Webber with just four laps to go, and the Aussie was visibly frustrated by then. On the same lap, Lucas di Grassi's Virgin suffered a suspension failure. After his phantom technical failure, the Red Bull mechanics had decided to leave Vettel's stop to the last lap, which they did, and the gamble paid off handsomely as the German emerged from the pits still in fourth place, ahead of his teammate.

Alonso crossed the line in first place to the delight of the Tifosi, with Button still less than three seconds in arrears. Massa was third to complete a double home podium for the Scuderia, while Vettel drove a recovery drive to bring the Red Bull home fourth, holding off a late challenge from Nico Rosberg, who had had a quiet race for Mercedes. Webber, Hülkenberg and Robert Kubica's Renault were all in close attendance, while Schumacher and Rubens Barrichello's Williams rounded out the points.

== Classification ==
=== Qualifying ===
Pos	No	Driver	Constructor	Part 1	Part 2	Part 3	Grid
1	8	(Spain) Fernando Alonso	Ferrari	1:22.646	1:22.297	1:21.962	1
2	1	(United Kingdom) Jenson Button	McLaren-Mercedes	1:23.085	1:22.354	1:22.084	2
3	7	(Brazil) Felipe Massa	Ferrari	1:22.421	1:22.610	1:22.293	3
4	6	(Australia) Mark Webber	Red Bull-Renault	1:23.431	1:22.706	1:22.433	4
5	2	(United Kingdom) Lewis Hamilton	McLaren-Mercedes	1:22.830	1:22.394	1:22.623	5
6	5	(Germany) Sebastian Vettel	Red Bull-Renault	1:23.235	1:22.701	1:22.675	6
7	4	(Germany) Nico Rosberg	Mercedes	1:23.529	1:23.055	1:23.027	7
8	10	(Germany) Nico Hülkenberg	Williams-Cosworth	1:23.516	1:22.989	1:23.037	8
9	11	(Poland) Robert Kubica	Renault	1:23.234	1:22.880	1:23.039	9
10	9	(Brazil) Rubens Barrichello	Williams-Cosworth	1:23.695	1:23.142	1:23.328	10
11	14	(Germany) Adrian Sutil	Force India-Mercedes	1:23.493	1:23.199		11
12	3	(Germany) Michael Schumacher	Mercedes	1:23.840	1:23.388		12
13	23	(Japan) Kamui Kobayashi	BMW Sauber-Ferrari	1:24.273	1:23.659		13
14	16	(Switzerland) Sébastien Buemi	Toro Rosso-Ferrari	1:23.744	1:23.681		14
15	12	(Russia) Vitaly Petrov	Renault	1:24.086	1:23.819		20^{1}
16	17	(Spain) Jaime Alguersuari	Toro Rosso-Ferrari	1:24.083	1:23.919		15
17	22	(Spain) Pedro de la Rosa	BMW Sauber-Ferrari	1:24.442	1:24.044		16
18	18	(Italy) Jarno Trulli	Lotus-Cosworth	1:25.540			17
19	19	(Finland) Heikki Kovalainen	Lotus-Cosworth	1:25.742			18
20	15	(Italy) Vitantonio Liuzzi	Force India-Mercedes	1:25.774			19
21	24	(Germany) Timo Glock	Virgin-Cosworth	1:25.934			24^{2}
22	25	(Brazil) Lucas di Grassi	Virgin-Cosworth	1:25.974			21
23	21	(Brazil) Bruno Senna	HRT-Cosworth	1:26.847			22
24	20	(Japan) Sakon Yamamoto	HRT-Cosworth	1:27.020			23

Notes:

1. Vitaly Petrov was handed a 5-place grid penalty for blocking Timo Glock in the first part of qualifying.
2. Timo Glock was handed a 5-place grid penalty for a gearbox change.

=== Race ===
Pos	No	Driver	Constructor	Laps	Time/Retired	Grid	Points
1	8	(Spain) Fernando Alonso	Ferrari	53	1:16:24.572	1	25
2	1	(United Kingdom) Jenson Button	McLaren-Mercedes	53	+2.938	2	18
3	7	(Brazil) Felipe Massa	Ferrari	53	+4.223	3	15
4	5	(Germany) Sebastian Vettel	Red Bull-Renault	53	+28.196	6	12
5	4	(Germany) Nico Rosberg	Mercedes	53	+29.942	7	10
6	6	(Australia) Mark Webber	Red Bull-Renault	53	+31.276	4	8
7	10	(Germany) Nico Hülkenberg	Williams-Cosworth	53	+32.812	8	6
8	11	(Poland) Robert Kubica	Renault	53	+34.028	9	4
9	3	(Germany) Michael Schumacher	Mercedes	53	+44.948	12	2
10	9	(Brazil) Rubens Barrichello	Williams-Cosworth	53	+1:04.213	10	1
11	16	(Switzerland) Sébastien Buemi	Toro Rosso-Ferrari	53	+1:05.056	14	
12	15	(Italy) Vitantonio Liuzzi	Force India-Mercedes	53	+1:06.106	19	
13	12	(Russia) Vitaly Petrov	Renault	53	+1:18.919	20	
14	22	(Spain) Pedro de la Rosa	BMW Sauber-Ferrari	52	+1 Lap	16	
15	17	(Spain) Jaime Alguersuari	Toro Rosso-Ferrari	52	+1 Lap	15	
16	14	(Germany) Adrian Sutil	Force India-Mercedes	52	+1 Lap	11	
17	24	(Germany) Timo Glock	Virgin-Cosworth	51	+2 Laps	24	
18	19	(Finland) Heikki Kovalainen	Lotus-Cosworth	51	+2 Laps	18	
19	20	(Japan) Sakon Yamamoto	HRT-Cosworth	51	+2 Laps	23	
20	25	(Brazil) Lucas di Grassi	Virgin-Cosworth	50	Suspension^{4}	21	
Ret	18	(Italy) Jarno Trulli	Lotus-Cosworth	46	Gearbox	17	
Ret	21	(Brazil) Bruno Senna	HRT-Cosworth	11	Hydraulics	22	
Ret	2	(United Kingdom) Lewis Hamilton	McLaren-Mercedes	0	Collision	5	
Ret	23	(Japan) Kamui Kobayashi	BMW Sauber-Ferrari	0	Gearbox	PL	

^3 Kamui Kobayashi started from the pit lane. ^4 Di Grassi was classified for completing 90% of the race winner's distance.

== Championship standings after the race ==
Drivers' Championship standings

	Pos.	Driver	Points
1	1	(Australia) Mark Webber*	187
1	2	(United Kingdom) Lewis Hamilton*	182
2	3	(Spain) Fernando Alonso*	166
	4	(United Kingdom) Jenson Button*	165
2	5	(Germany) Sebastian Vettel*	163

Constructors' Championship standings

Pos.	Constructor	Points
1	(Austria) Red Bull-Renault*	350
2	(United Kingdom) McLaren-Mercedes*	347
3	(Italy) Ferrari*	290
4	(Germany) Mercedes*	158
5	(France) Renault	127

- Note: Only the top five positions are included for both sets of standings.
- Bold text and an asterisk indicates competitors who still had a theoretical chance of becoming World Champion.

== See also ==
- 2010 Monza GP2 Series round
- 2010 Monza GP3 Series round

Previous race: 2010 Belgian Grand Prix	FIA Formula One World Championship; 2010 season	Next race: 2010 Singapore Grand Prix
Previous race: 2009 Italian Grand Prix	Italian Grand Prix	Next race: 2011 Italian Grand Prix
