= Toni Cuquerella =

Spanish motor racing engineer and television presenter

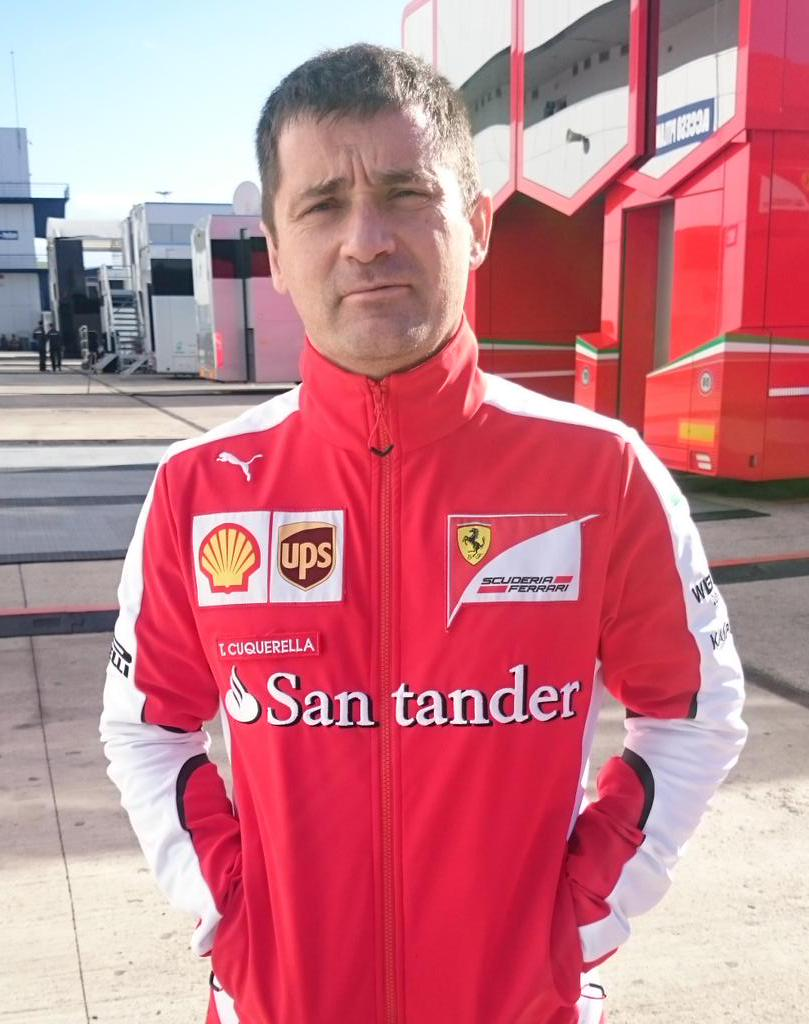
- Cuquerella in 2015
- Born: Antonio Cuquerella; 14 April 1973 (age 53); Gandia, Valencia, Spain
- Education: Technical University of Valencia
- Occupations: Engineer, television presenter
- Years active: 1999–present
- Employer: DAZN

Antonio Cuquerella (born 14 April 1973) is a Spanish engineer and television presenter. He currently works for DAZN as Formula One commentator.

== Biography ==
Cuquerella was graduated from Technical University of Valencia with a degree in industrial engineering. After working for Campos Racing and Cupra Racing, he made his Formula One debut in 2006 as the race engineer for Super Aguri F1. He moved to the BMW Sauber F1 Team in 2008, when he became the race engineer of Robert Kubica. He joined HRT Formula 1 Team at the end of 2009, and got promoted to technical director for the 2012 season.

Cuquerella moved across to the Deutsche Tourenwagen Masters series following the omission of the HRT team. He returned to the F1 paddock in 2015, joining Scuderia Ferrari as chief race engineer. He left the team ahead of the 2017 season.

Cuquerella was signed by Movistar in 2017 as the commentator for Formula One. He switched to Formula E one year later, and working under multiple titles for Mahindra Racing from 2018 to 2022. In 2023, he joined DAZN as Formula One commentator.
