= José Ramón Carabante =

Spanish businessman

José Ramón Carabante (born 1952 in Málaga) is a Spanish businessman, who owned the Hispania Racing Formula One team. Carebante owns a number of Spanish businesses including Grupo Hispania, a property management company with a variety of interests in Europe and America, and the CB Murcia basketball team. He was a shareholder in the Campos Meta F1 team, which had gained an entry for the 2010 Formula One season, before taking full control when the team ran into financial difficulties shortly before the start of the season. The team was renamed to Hispania Racing F1 Team (HRT) after Carabante's Grupo Hispania company. HRT continued to struggle financially throughout its first year of racing, and Carabante sold the team to investment company Thesan Capital in July 2011. The HRT team eventually folded at the end of 2012.
