= 2010 German Grand Prix =

11th round of the 2010 Formula One season

Race 11 of 19 in the 2010 Formula One World Championship
| ← Previous race | Next race → |
- Layout of the Hockenheimring circuit

Race details
- Date: 25 July 2010
- Official name: Formula 1 Grosser Preis Santander von Deutschland 2010
- Location: Hockenheimring, Hockenheim, Baden-Württemberg, Germany
- Course: Permanent racing facility
- Course length: 4.574 km (2.842 miles)
- Distance: 67 laps, 306.458 km (190.424 miles)
- Weather: Mainly cloudy, dry

Pole position
| Driver | (Germany) Sebastian Vettel | Red Bull-Renault |
- Time: 1:13.791

Fastest lap
| Driver | (Germany) Sebastian Vettel | Red Bull-Renault |
- Time: 1:15.824 on lap 67

Podium
| First | (Spain) Fernando Alonso | Ferrari |
| Second | (Brazil) Felipe Massa | Ferrari |
| Third | (Germany) Sebastian Vettel | Red Bull-Renault |

The 2010 German Grand Prix (formally the Formula 1 Grosser Preis Santander von Deutschland 2010) was a Formula One motor race held on 25 July at the Hockenheimring in Hockenheim, Baden-Württemberg, Germany. It was the 11th round of the 2010 Formula One World Championship and the 71st German Grand Prix. Ferrari driver Fernando Alonso won the 67-lap race starting from second position. His teammate Felipe Massa finished second, and Red Bull driver Sebastian Vettel took third.

Lewis Hamilton led the World Drivers' Championship and his team McLaren led the World Constructors' Championship heading into the race. Although Vettel and Alonso were on the grid's front row, both drivers were passed by Massa at the start of the race. Alonso and Massa traded the fastest times in the first 12 laps until a sequence of pit stops. Massa struggled with tyre temperatures and Alonso challenged him on the 21st lap but fended off his efforts to take the lead. Massa pulled away slightly from Alonso until traffic slowed him and reduced the time deficit between the two drivers. Alonso took over the lead after Ferrari invoked team orders on Massa to allow Alonso past. Massa resisted pressure from Vettel while Alonso maintained the lead for the rest of the race to take the 23rd victory of his career.

Ferrari's team orders resulted in a fine of $100,000 by the race stewards but avoided further punishment from the FIA World Motor Sport Council in September 2010. Alonso's victory put him within 13 championship points of Vettel in the World Drivers' Championship, while the leader Lewis Hamilton extended his advantage over teammate Jenson Button by two championship points. Red Bull slightly reduced the deficit to McLaren in the World Constructors' Championship, while Ferrari moved further ahead of Mercedes, with eight races left in the season.

== Background ==
The 2010 German Grand Prix was the 11th scheduled race of the 2010 Formula One World Championship and was held on 25 July 2010 at the Hockenheimring, Hockenheim, Baden-Württemberg, Germany. The Grand Prix was contested by twelve teams with two drivers each. The teams (also known as constructors) were: McLaren, Mercedes, Red Bull, Ferrari, Williams, Renault, Force India, Toro Rosso, Lotus, Hispania, Sauber and Virgin. Tyre supplier Bridgestone brought four types of tyre to the race; two dry compounds (super-soft "options" and hard "primes") and two wet-weather compounds (intermediate and full wet). Bridgestone selected those compounds in an attempt to improve the excitement of Formula One after a large amount of degradation and graining was observed during the Canadian Grand Prix. The soft compounds were denoted by a green stripe on their side-walls; the wet compound tyres were identified by a green line at the bottom of their central groove.

Before the race, McLaren driver Lewis Hamilton led the Drivers' Championship with 145 championship points, 12 ahead of teammate Jenson Button in second who was five championship points in front of Mark Webber in third. Webber's teammate Sebastian Vettel was fourth on 121 championship points and Fernando Alonso was fifth on 98 championship points. McLaren were leading the Constructors' Championship with 278 championship points; Red Bull and Ferrari were second and third with 249 and 165 championship points, while Mercedes (126 championship points) and Renault (89) contended for fourth place. McLaren and Red Bull had dominated the championship, while Alonso won the season-opening Bahrain Grand Prix. His teammate Felipe Massa and Robert Kubica had finished in second place, and Nico Rosberg (three times) Massa and Kubica (once) had taken third-place finishes.

After the previous German Grand Prix (at the Nürburgring) in July 2009, the future of the race was in doubt after the government of Baden-Württemberg and the town of Hockenheim withdrew their funding for the event. Planned discussions between the owner of Formula One's commercial rights Bernie Ecclestone and Günther Oettinger, the Minister-President of Baden-Württemberg, to renegotiate the expenses for hosting the event had ended after Ecclestone made controversial comments regarding Adolf Hitler, and the organisers of the Nürburgring circuit announced that they would not hold the race in 2010 because of a commitment to hold the event in 2011. An agreement was reached in September which would see the event run until 2018 with both circuit's management and Formula One Management agreeing to cover any losses incurred.

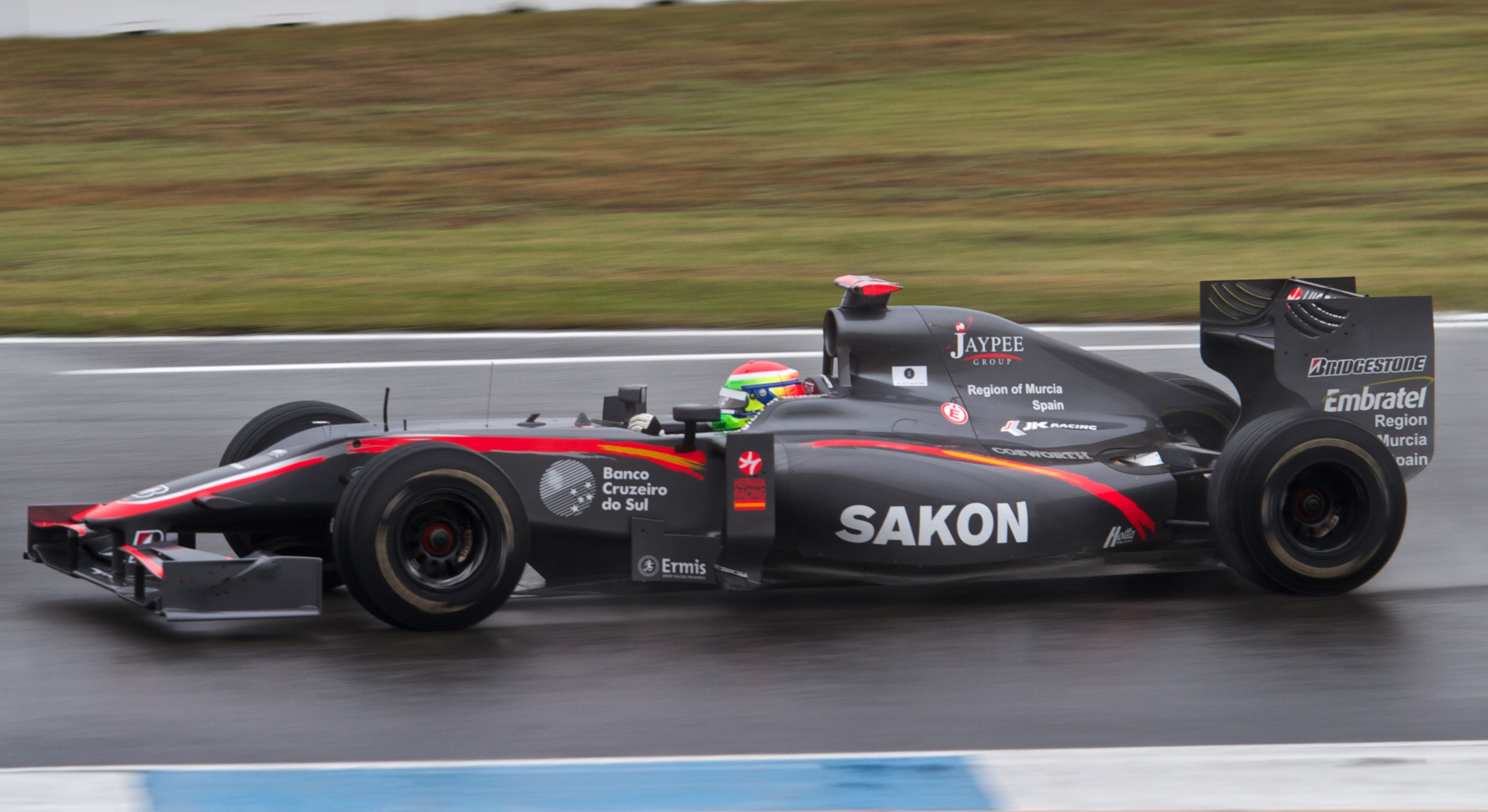
After replacing Bruno Senna at the British Grand Prix, Sakon Yamamoto replaced Karun Chandhok in Hispania Racing's second car.

Despite winning the season-opening Bahrain Grand Prix, Alonso faced pressure heading into the second half of the season; he was 47 championship points behind Hamilton in the World Drivers' Championship after scoring four championship points in the last two races. Alonso had been largely affected by safety car periods in Valencia and Silverstone despite his team having narrowed the performance gap on their championship rivals. However, Alonso remained upbeat about his title chances and said his team had more motivation to succeed despite his recent results. Journalist Tony Dodgins wrote that Ferrari had decided the marque had to prioritise Alonso over teammate Massa at this point in the season. Hamilton, the defending race winner at the Hockenheimring, spoke of his feeling the race would provide an indication on form for the second half of the year and believed McLaren should have a successful car balance to be competitive at the track.

Several teams made alterations to their cars in preparation for the event. Mercedes introduced a new version of their car's rear wing which was designed to work more efficiently with their F-duct system. Ferrari brought a refinement to their exhaust system and modified their diffuser's side channels. Red Bull introduced minor improvements to their car's F-duct system and both of their drivers used a front wing specification which courted controversy at the preceding British Grand Prix. McLaren used a blown diffuser which was discarded after the Friday practice sessions at the previous Grand Prix and was changed for the German Grand Prix. The diffuser been moved outwards but had a longer inner section, the pipe was cut off at an angle, and the carbon materials for its side channel were changed. Sauber came to the circuit with their car carrying several aerodynamic upgrades which included a modified diffuser.

There was one driver change heading into the race. Karun Chandhok was dropped from the Hispania Racing team and was replaced by Sakon Yamamoto while Bruno Senna reclaimed his race seat after sitting out the British Grand Prix. Hispania released a statement which said Yamamoto was given another opportunity to race after impressing at the previous race and that Chandhok remained part of the team.

== Practice ==
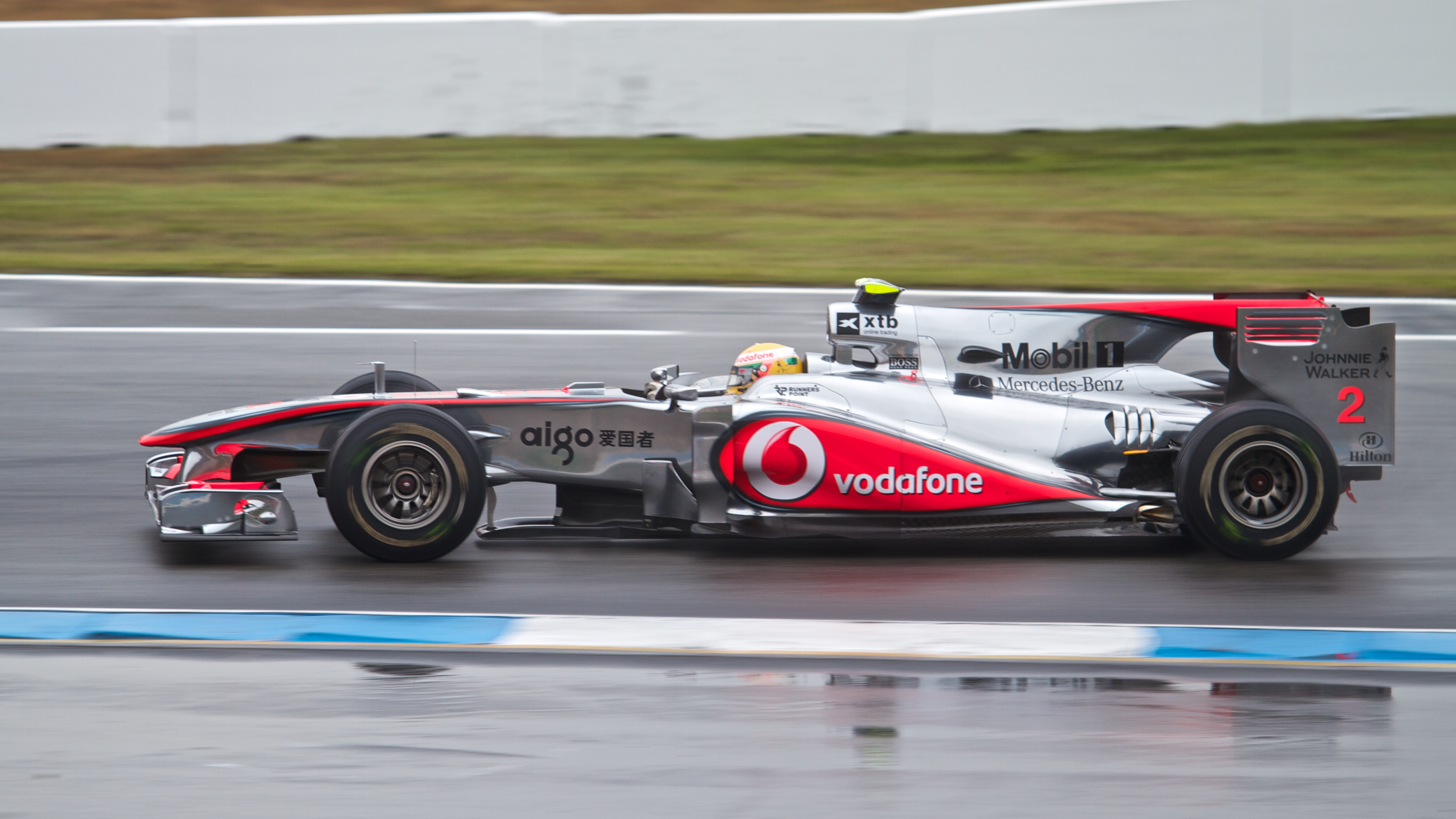
Lewis Hamilton crashed in the first practice session.

There were three practice sessions—two 90-minute sessions on Friday and a 60-minute session on Saturday—preceding Sunday's race. The first session was initially held in wet-weather conditions before less rain fell and drivers were required to adapt to changing levels of grip. Full wet tyres were used in the session's opening period before the field utilised intermediate tyres in its closing minutes. The conditions prevented the teams from collecting data on how the dry-compound tyres would perform. Adrian Sutil was the fastest driver with a time of 1:25.701, ahead of Massa who spun several times and had the fastest time until Sutil's lap. Jenson Button was third-fastest despite reporting a handling imbalance, ahead of Rubens Barrichello (who spun at high-speed at turn three after driving into a large amount of standing water) Vitaly Petrov, Rosberg and Sébastien Buemi. Nico Hülkenberg, Vitantonio Liuzzi and Pedro de la Rosa rounded out the session's top-ten drivers. Hamilton drove over standing water at the exit of the turn three left-hander twenty minutes before the session ended and slid sideways into the turn four tyre barrier, heavily damaging his car.

Most of the track dried up despite a light rain shower before the second practice session and drivers recorded more lap times to make up for the lack of running in the first session. Some drivers also went off the circuit. Alonso set the fastest lap of the day with a time of 1:16.265; Massa finished with the third-fastest time. The two Red Bull drivers were second and fourth (with Vettel ahead of Webber). All of the top four quickest drivers set their fastest lap times on the super-soft dry compound tyre. Rosberg was fifth-fastest (despite damaging his front wing after he collided with a kerb bollard), ahead of his Mercedes teammate Michael Schumacher in sixth. Hamilton, Kubica, Barrichello and Hülkenberg followed in the top ten. A heavy rain shower hit the circuit on Saturday morning which stopped before the final practice session started. Drivers were initially forced to use intermediate tyres before switching later to dry-weather conditions and the teams worked on car set-up for qualifying. Vettel set the fastest lap, a 1:15.503; Webber finished with the third-fastest time. They were separated by the Ferrari drivers in second and fourth (with Alonso ahead of Massa). Rosberg duplicated his second-session result in fifth. Hamilton, Schumacher, Barrichello, Kubica and Hülkenberg completed the top ten ahead of qualifying. Sutil was unable to record a lap time when his Force India's driveshaft broke though he managed to return to his garage and lost 45 minutes of running.

== Qualifying ==
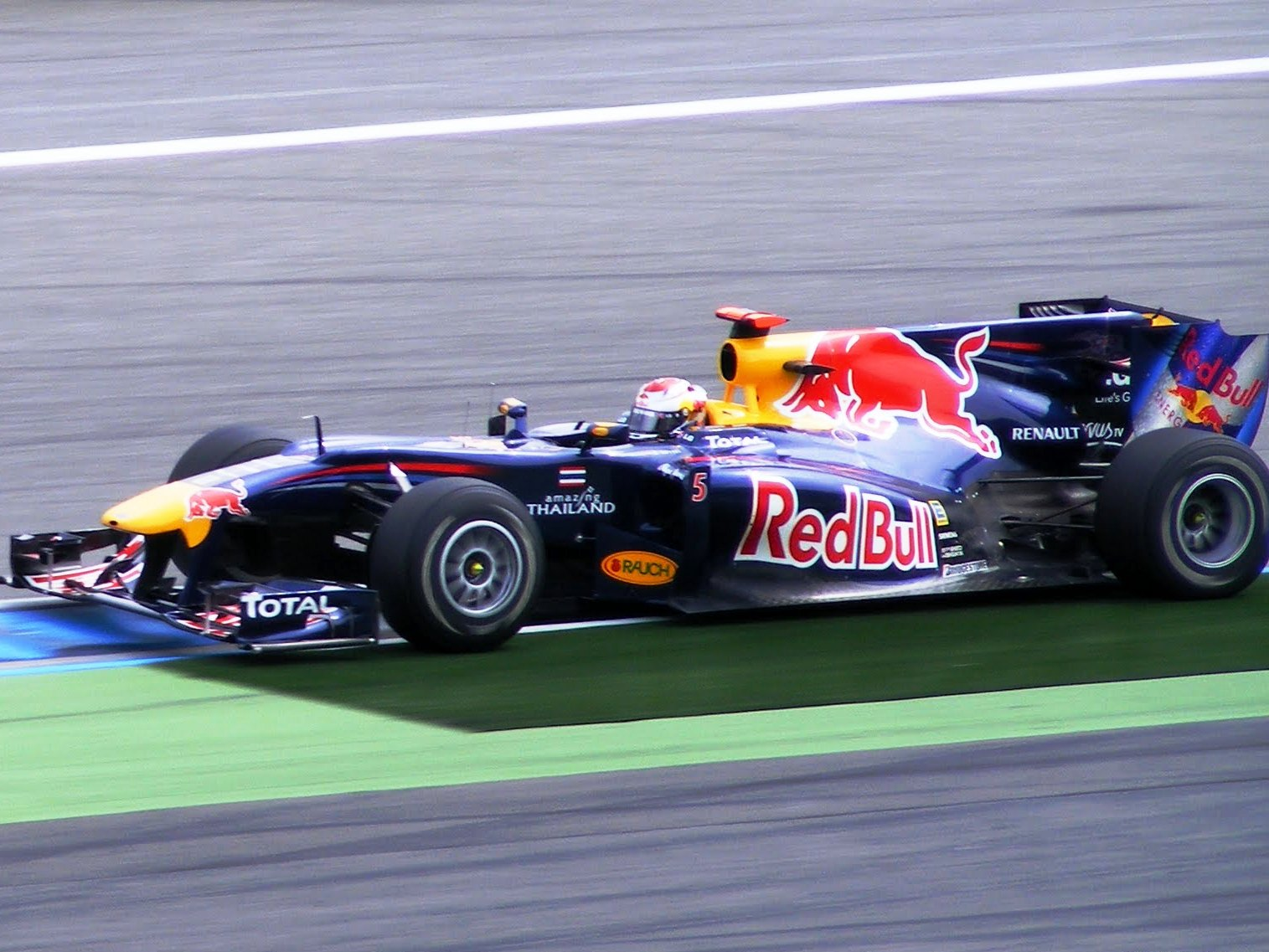
Sebastian Vettel took his sixth pole position of his season.

Saturday afternoon's qualifying session was divided into three parts. The first part ran for 20 minutes and eliminated the cars that finished 18th or lower. The second part of qualifying lasted 15 minutes and eliminated cars that finished in positions 11 to 17. The final session ran for ten minutes and determined pole position to 10th. Cars which competed in the final session were not allowed to change tyres before the race. They started the race fitted with the tyres used when they set their quickest lap times. The session was held in dry weather conditions but dark clouds brought a risk of further rain showers. With limited dry running in the final practice session grip levels rose as qualifying progressed.

Vettel set the fastest time in the final session which clinched him the sixth pole position of his season (and his third consecutive) with a lap of 1:13.791 which was recorded on his final timed lap. Although he was happy to start on the pole he said his lap was not "100% perfect" as he drove off the circuit after he pushed hard. Vettel was joined on the grid's front row by Alonso who was 0.002 seconds after Alonso had recorded the fastest times in the first and second sessions. Massa took third despite running wide on his final timed lap but was optimistic on a track where he felt comfortable. Webber, fourth, ran wide at the Nordkurve right-hand corner on his final lap when he turned in late and cut the kerb which cost him three seconds and he opted to abandon his lap. The two McLaren cars lined up on the grid's third row (with Button ahead of Hamilton). Button was happy with his lap whilst Hamilton said his qualifying pace was poor despite the McLaren drivers recording the fastest speeds on the circuit's main straight. Kubica qualified seventh and felt he could have set a faster lap time as he was held up in the track's final sector. Barrichello in eighth experienced understeer in the final session and lost his car's balance. Rosberg and Hülkenberg rounded out the top ten qualifiers.

Schumacher was the fastest driver not to advance to the final session, qualifying 11h; his best time of 1:15.026 was almost two seconds slower than Alonso's fastest time in the second session. He had been one tenth of a second quicker than his teammate Rosberg in the first session; Rosberg's lap caused Schumacher to be eliminated from qualifying and the latter stated he had brake problems. Kamui Kobayashi qualified in 12th was slowed by traffic, and his tyre temperatures dropped which resulted in a loss of grip. He was followed by Petrov in 13th position. Sutil was afflicted with a lack of grip in his Force India which caused him to slide sideways. Sutil was penalised five positions because this team changed his gearbox following his driveshaft failure in the final practice session. As a result, De la Rosa inherited 14th, and was ahead of the Toro Rosso drivers (Jaime Alguersuari in front of Buemi). Jarno Trulli was the quickest driver who was unable to advance beyond the first session, and was followed by his Lotus teammate Heikki Kovalainen. Timo Glock was penalised five positions on the grid twice because his team changed his gearbox and fitted a seventh-gear ratio that was undeclared on Friday. Senna took over the 20th place. Liuzzi exited turn 15 to complete his second timed lap, ran over a wet patch of astroturf causing him to lose control of the back-end of his Force India, sending him across the track to make heavy contact with the front of his car. He veered back towards the track and some grass and narrowly avoided collecting Glock. Sakon Yamamoto had a shifting issue on his fastest lap time and took 23rd. Lucas di Grassi had a gearbox problem in his car that was unable to be rectified and completed the field. He later incurred a five-place grid penalty for the gearbox change but it had no effect on his starting position.

=== Qualifying classification ===
The fastest lap in each of the three sessions is denoted in bold.

| Pos | No | Driver | Constructor | Q1 | Q2 | Q3 | Grid |
|---|---|---|---|---|---|---|---|
| 1 | 5 | (Germany) Sebastian Vettel | Red Bull-Renault | 1:15.152 | 1:14.249 | **1:13.791** | 1 |
| 2 | 8 | (Spain) Fernando Alonso | Ferrari | **1:14.808** | **1:14.081** | 1:13.793 | 2 |
| 3 | 7 | (Brazil) Felipe Massa | Ferrari | 1:15.216 | 1:14.478 | 1:14.290 | 3 |
| 4 | 6 | (Australia) Mark Webber | Red Bull-Renault | 1:15.334 | 1:14.340 | 1:14.347 | 4 |
| 5 | 1 | (United Kingdom) Jenson Button | McLaren-Mercedes | 1:15.823 | 1:14.716 | 1:14.427 | 5 |
| 6 | 2 | (United Kingdom) Lewis Hamilton | McLaren-Mercedes | 1:15.505 | 1:14.488 | 1:14.566 | 6 |
| 7 | 11 | (Poland) Robert Kubica | Renault | 1:15.736 | 1:14.835 | 1:15.079 | 7 |
| 8 | 9 | (Brazil) Rubens Barrichello | Williams-Cosworth | 1:16.398 | 1:14.698 | 1:15.109 | 8 |
| 9 | 4 | (Germany) Nico Rosberg | Mercedes | 1:16.178 | 1:15.018 | 1:15.179 | 9 |
| 10 | 10 | (Germany) Nico Hülkenberg | Williams-Cosworth | 1:16.387 | 1:14.943 | 1:15.339 | 10 |
| 11 | 3 | (Germany) Michael Schumacher | Mercedes | 1:16.084 | 1:15.026 | N/A | 11 |
| 12 | 23 | (Japan) Kamui Kobayashi | BMW Sauber-Ferrari | 1:15.951 | 1:15.084 | N/A | 12 |
| 13 | 12 | (Russia) Vitaly Petrov | Renault | 1:16.521 | 1:15.307 | N/A | 13 |
| 14 | 14 | (Germany) Adrian Sutil | Force India-Mercedes | 1:16.220 | 1:15.467 | N/A | 19^{1} |
| 15 | 22 | (Spain) Pedro de la Rosa | BMW Sauber-Ferrari | 1:16.450 | 1:15.550 | N/A | 14 |
| 16 | 17 | (Spain) Jaime Alguersuari | Toro Rosso-Ferrari | 1:16.664 | 1:15.588 | N/A | 15 |
| 17 | 16 | (Switzerland) Sébastien Buemi | Toro Rosso-Ferrari | 1:16.029 | 1:15.974 | N/A | 16 |
| 18 | 18 | (Italy) Jarno Trulli | Lotus-Cosworth | 1:17.583 | N/A | N/A | 17 |
| 19 | 19 | (Finland) Heikki Kovalainen | Lotus-Cosworth | 1:18.300 | N/A | N/A | 18 |
| 20 | 24 | (Germany) Timo Glock | Virgin-Cosworth | 1:18.343 | N/A | N/A | 23^{2} |
| 21 | 21 | (Brazil) Bruno Senna | HRT-Cosworth | 1:18.592 | N/A | N/A | 20 |
| 22 | 15 | (Italy) Vitantonio Liuzzi | Force India-Mercedes | 1:18.952 | N/A | N/A | 21 |
| 23 | 20 | (Japan) Sakon Yamamoto | HRT-Cosworth | 1:19.844 | N/A | N/A | 22 |
| 24 | 25 | (Brazil) Lucas di Grassi | Virgin-Cosworth | N/A | N/A | N/A | 24 ^{1} |

Notes

- **^1** – Adrian Sutil and Lucas di Grassi were both given five-place grid penalties for gearbox changes.
- **^2** – Timo Glock was given two five-place grid penalties for a gearbox change, and for fitting a seventh-gear ratio that was not declared on Friday.

== Race ==
The race took place in the afternoon from 14:00 Central European Summer Time (UTC+2). The conditions on the grid were cloudy before the start; there was an air temperature between 21 and 25 °C (70 and 77 °F), with a track temperature ranging from 28 to 35 °C (82 to 95 °F), and no rain was expected. The top ten qualifiers started on the super-soft compound tyre. As the five red lights went out to signal the start of the race, Vettel released his clutch pedal, found that he had poor acceleration driving off his starting position, but avoided stalling his engine. He drove right towards Alonso in an attempt to put the latter towards the pit lane wall heading into the first corner. Alonso was on the racing line and overtook Vettel. However, neither driver took the lead as Massa had made a fast start and passed both drivers around the outside. Button avoided hitting the back of Vettel's car by swerving and braking early for the first corner. Further round, Alguersuari committed to the braking zone late at the turn six hairpin, drove into the rear of his teammate Buemi, which removed Buemi's rear wing and his own front wing, and debris was littered across the track. Hamilton passed Webber for fourth place on the same lap. At the end of the first lap, the order was: Massa, Alonso, Vettel, Hamilton, Webber, Button, Kubica, Schumacher, Rosberg and Kobayashi.

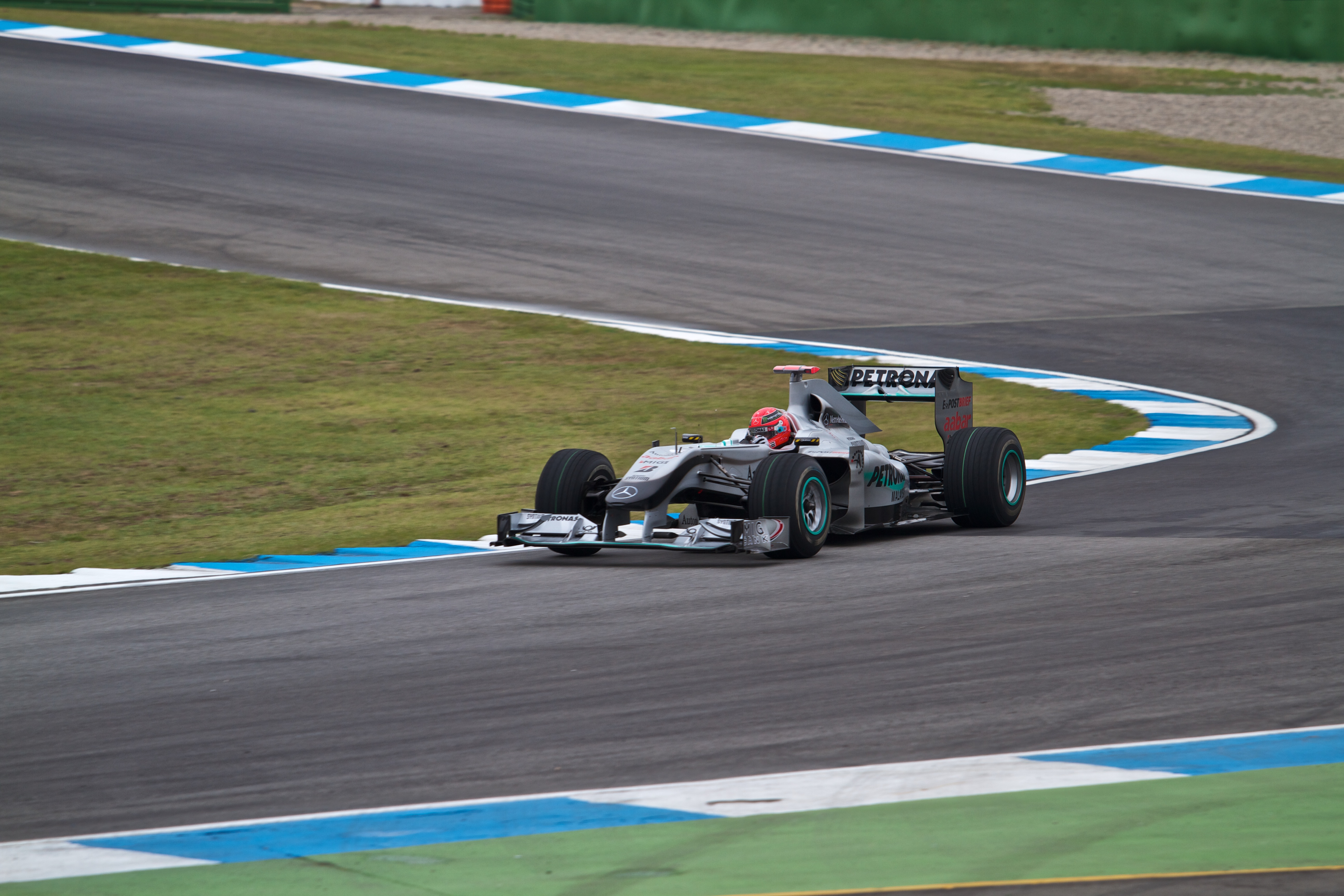
Michael Schumacher took two championship points at his home Grand Prix.

Elsewhere, Force India committed an error when bringing their drivers in early. Liuzzi made contact with Sutil which damaged his front wing. The team had been expecting Liuzzi to pit before Sutil, but the latter was the first to arrive into the team's pit stall. It was only after both drivers had returned to the circuit that the team realised they had accidentally placed Liuzzi's tyres on Sutil's car and Sutil's tyres on Liuzzi's. Buemi was pushed back into his garage and became the race's first retirement with accident damage on the second lap. Hamilton was running close behind Vettel but despite his car's straight-line speed advantage, he was unable to affect an overtaking manoeuvre. Hamilton later dropped further away from Vettel. Trulli became afflicted with a gearbox issue which meant he was unable to select second gear, and his mechanics pushed his Lotus T127 back into his garage where they attempted to rectify the issue without success. Alonso recorded lap times faster than teammate Massa which reduced the gap to 1.1 seconds by the conclusion of lap six. Trulli was released from his garage by his team but drove slowly around the circuit and elected to retire on the next lap.

Massa responded to Alonso's quick pace with his fastest lap time to increase the gap by four-tenths of a second. Button ran wide at the first corner and fell further behind sixth-place driver Webber. Hamilton set a slow time which allowed Webber to close the gap to the former. Vettel became the first driver to make a scheduled pit stop for the hard-compound tyres on the 12th lap, and rejoined in sixth in front of Kubica. It was part of a strategy by Red Bull to place him into clear air in the hopes that he could make up some time on the leading Ferrari cars. Alguersuari drove alongside Yamamoto over the start/finish line and he made a pass for 19th entering the first corner on the same lap. Ferrari responded to Red Bull's decision by bringing Alonso and Massa in for their stops in quick succession, handing the lead to Button. Alonso rejoined ahead of Vettel, and was followed by Webber, but he exited the pit lane among a pack of slower cars and was immediately challenged by Kobayashi. Massa began to struggle with tyre temperatures and locked-up at turn two, and lost the balance of his car at the turn six hairpin.

Alguersuari overtook Glock for 18th on lap 17, and started to reduce the gap between himself and Senna. Button, who was still to make a pit stop, set faster lap times than other cars despite being on a worn set of soft-compound tyres. The battle between the two Ferrari drivers allowed Vettel to quickly close the gap. Alguersuari passed Di Grassi to move into 16th place on the 21st lap. Alonso and Massa had caught up to slower cars by the same lap, which allowed the former to attempt a pass on the Brazilian by driving on the inside line heading into the turn six hairpin. But Massa held a quicker line leaving the corner which allowed him to defend his position. Alonso attempted to pass again heading into the following turn but backed out of the manoeuvre. He was angry and told his team "This is ridiculous" because he saw Massa placing him in danger of being challenged by both the Red Bull cars; it prompted intense discussion regarding the matter on the Ferrari pit wall. Yamamoto pulled over to the side of the track when his engine cut out on lap 19 while battling with both Force India drivers.

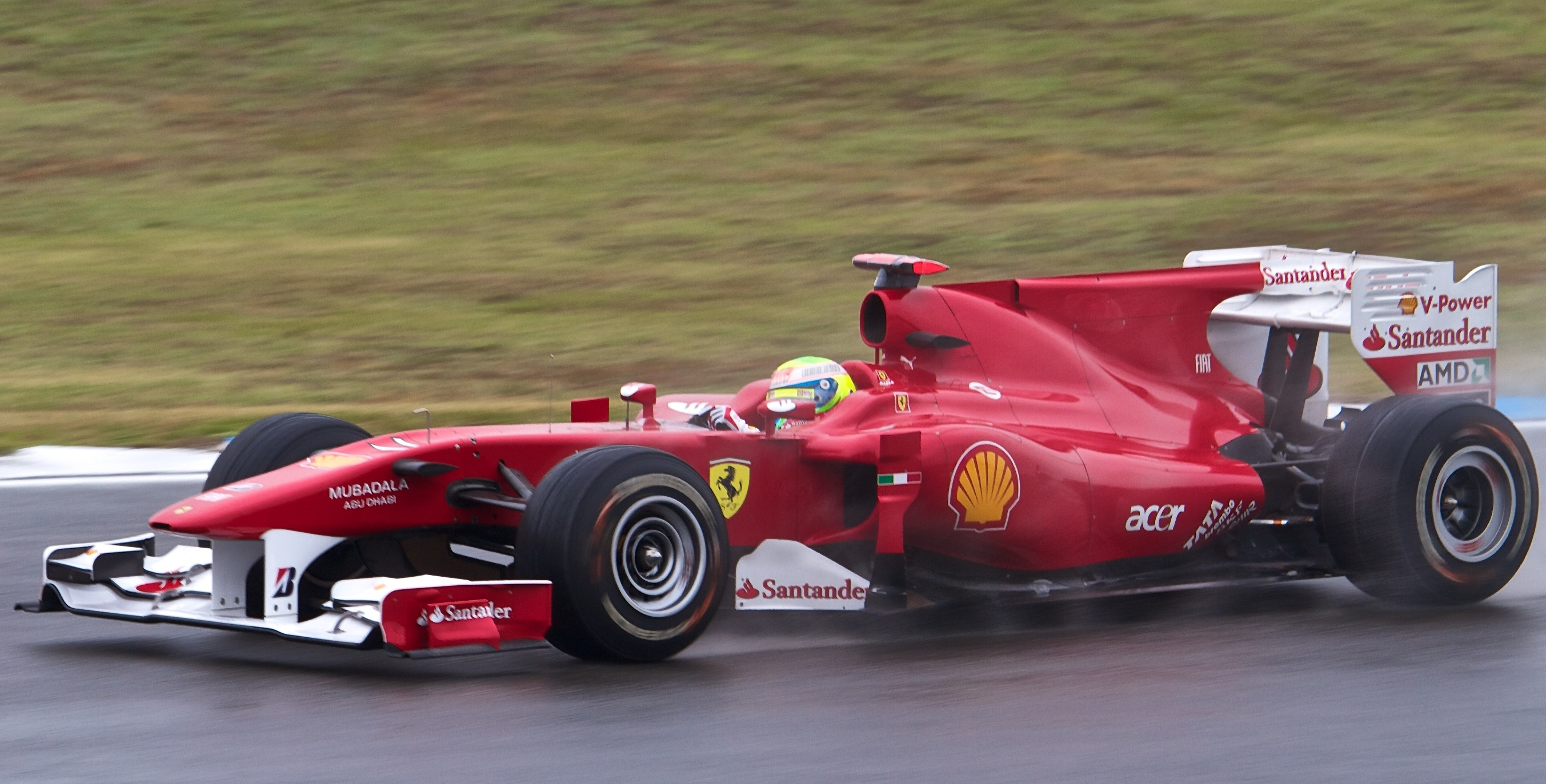
Felipe Massa controversially let teammate Fernando Alonso past into the lead.

After passing slower cars, Vettel began to resume his battle with the Ferrari drivers. Button made a pit stop on lap 22 and reemerged in fifth position behind his teammate Hamilton. The Ferrari cars began to set faster lap times than the rest of the field as Massa started to pull away from Alonso and held a lead of three seconds over his teammate. Alonso responded to Massa's newfound pace by recording a new fastest lap of the race, a 1:18.075 on lap 28, having backed out to see how fast his car was in clean air, before the two drivers began to trade fastest times over the next three laps. Webber attempted to place pressure on Button in a battle for fifth place, although Button was using a defensive strategy by using his McLaren's straight-line speed advantage. De la Rosa caught up to Hülkenberg and passed him at the turn six hairpin on lap 35. Three laps later, Hamilton was instructed by McLaren to conserve fuel usage in the event they could use an aggressive fuel saving mode towards the end of the race.

By lap 39, Alonso had reduced the time deficit between himself and Massa as the latter was lapping the two Virgin cars. At the start of lap 40, Massa held a 1.2 second lead over Alonso, who in turn, was 5.2 seconds in front of Vettel. Hamilton in fourth place was 18.1 seconds behind, but was maintaining a steady gap to teammate Button in fifth. Webber was told by Red Bull over the radio to increase the gap to Button, because his car was suffering from an issue with its oil consumption, and was told that braking harder into the track's turns would possibly assist in moving some oil around the inside of his car. Petrov made an error which allowed Kobayashi to take advantage but Petrov held off the challenge. A radio transmission from Rob Smedley, Massa's race engineer, was intercepted on lap 48, with Smedley telling Massa, "OK, so, Fernando (Alonso) is faster than you. Can you confirm you understood that message?" Based on Smedley's tone, commentators surmised that it had been a coded message from engineer to driver telling Massa to move over and allow Alonso through, something Smedley was instructed to tell Massa by Ferrari.

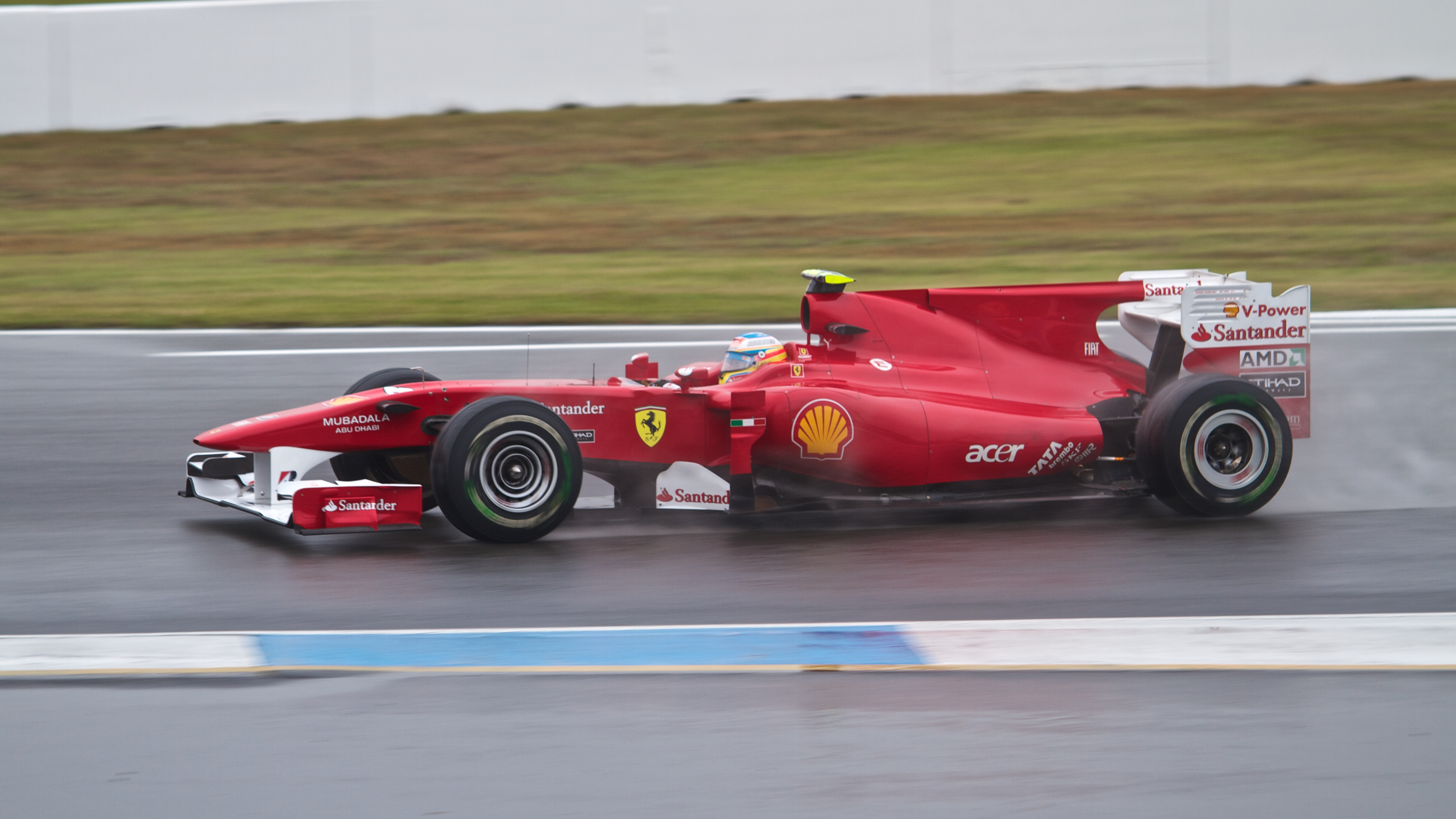
Fernando Alonso took the 23rd victory of his career.

Massa was slow to accelerate leaving the turn six hairpin on lap 49, giving Alonso the opening he needed to take the lead. Smedley was later heard thanking and apologising to Massa over the radio, further suggesting that the previous message was a coded team order. De la Rosa made his solitary pit stop of the event for super-soft compound tyres on lap 51. Di Grassi, at turn one on the same lap, hit a kerb damaging his car's rear suspension, which rendered him unable to continue in the race. He was pushed into his garage by his team to retire. Vettel pressured Massa by setting consecutive fastest laps to reduce the time gap between them. Petrov was on course to score one point but was told by his team to shift early into seventh gear on lap 58 otherwise his maximum revolutions per minute would be changed to a lower setting.

De la Rosa attempted to lap Kovalainen around the inside of the second corner on the 60th lap but the two cars made contact. De la Rosa sustained damage to a section of his front wing while Kovalainen drove to his garage and vacated his car to become the Grand Prix's final retirement on lap 61. Vettel continued to push hard in his effort to pass Massa for second place, while Hamilton was told he was no longer required to conserve fuel on the 63rd lap. Button ran wide at the first corner on the penultimate lap of the race but continued in fifth place. Alonso maintained the lead throughout the remainder of the event and crossed the start/finish line on lap 67 to secure the 23rd victory of his Formula One career. Massa finished second 4.1 seconds behind, and Vettel was third. Hamilton secured fourth, with teammate Button in fifth. Webber reduced his pace to finish in sixth place. Kubica, Rosberg, Schumacher and Petrov rounded out the points-scoring positions. Kobayashi, Barrichello, Hülkenberg, De la Rosa, Alguersuari, Liuzzi, Sutil, Glock and Senna were the final classified finishers.

=== Post-race ===
The top three drivers appeared on the podium to collect their trophies and spoke to the media at a later press conference. Alonso described his race weekend as "good overall" and felt the one-two finish for Ferrari was a deserving and strong result. He said he felt that the team's motivation would drop in the event of poor finishes and stated that Ferrari would get overexcited after finishing strongly and did not see a reason to be pessimistic for the next race of the season. Massa said it was a "very good" race for his team and that his tyres behaved better than he had expected. He felt he was not in the battle for the championship because he had lost a large number of valuable points and said every person recognised that he was able to win races and be competitive. Vettel said that despite losing two positions at the start of the race, he felt comfortable in his car and was happy to clinch a podium position at his home Grand Prix. Although he said he would have preferred to have scored more points, he felt third place was the best result his team could secure, a finish that Red Bull could be proud of.

Fourth-place finisher Hamilton said it had been a tough race for him because his car did not feel as good as he hoped. He had also hoped the gap would be closer than it was in qualifying. Webber stated that he enjoyed the first part of the event and was looking forward to the next race of the season. Kovalainen was issued with a reprimand for his role in the collision with De la Rosa. He admitted that he was at fault for causing the incident because he was allowing another car to pass him and had not seen De la Rosa approaching him. Force India's chief operating officer Otmar Szafnauer said the confusion resulting in the error of fitting the wrong tyres for both their drivers was an example of cause and effect. He wanted to disregard the issue and look forward to the next few races. The team received a warning from the stewards and avoided disqualification because they had recognised their mistake immediately.

Ferrari's use of team orders, which resulted in Massa relinquishing the lead to Alonso on lap 49, risked the team's exclusion from the race results. Team principal Stefano Domenicali, Ferrari manager Massimo Rivola, and Alonso and Massa were summoned by the stewards because they were considered have transgressed Article 39.1 of the 2010 Fédération Internationale de l'Automobile (FIA) Sporting Regulations, and were charged with violating Article 151c of the FIA's sporting code. The team was issued a $100,000 (£64,700) fine for the rule infringements, and the stewards decided that the result of the event would be unchanged. Ferrari was referred to the FIA World Motor Sport Council for further deliberation. The team was heavily criticised by the Formula One paddock. Red Bull team principal Christian Horner called it "the clearest team order I've ever seen". BBC Sport pundit and former team owner Eddie Jordan was more vocal, stating the orders were "unlawful", felt it was "theft", and prevented the chance of having a race-winning battle between the two Ferrari drivers. He felt the two cars should have been disqualified. Schumacher argued that Ferrari were concentrating on securing the Drivers' Championship.

Domenicali insisted there were no team orders and that it was Massa who chose to allow Alonso past. Alonso reaffirmed Domenicalli's statement and admitted he was surprised when Massa slowed and claimed that he felt Massa had a gearbox issue. FIA reporter Lars Österlind investigated the incident and sent a 160-page report to the World Motor Sport Council which concluded that Alonso should be given a five-second time penalty which would hand the victory to Massa. He also wanted a suspended penalty on the loss of Ferrari's Drivers' and Constructors' points scored in the event. At the World Motor Sport Council meeting held in Paris on 8 September, the tribunal elected to uphold the $100,000 fine imposed on Ferrari, decided that no further action would be taken against the team, and that Formula One's Sporting Working Group would review the rule that prohibited team orders. In December, the FIA announced a reversion on the rule barring team orders from the 2011 season onwards because it was difficult to enforce. Parallels were made between the race and the 2002 Austrian Grand Prix where Barrichello was ordered by Ferrari to concede the event's victory to Schumacher on its final lap, although team orders were allowed then.

The result extended Hamilton's lead in the World Drivers' Championship to 14 championship points over Button. Vettel's third-place finish tied him with Webber in third place on 136 championship points, and Alonso's victory put him within 13 championship points of the Red Bull drivers. McLaren maintained their lead in the World Constructors' Championship, although Red Bull's finish of third and sixth meant they reduced the gap by one championship point. Ferrari's one-two result allowed them to reduce the points deficit to Red Bull slightly. Mercedes and Renault remained in fourth and fifth positions, with eight races left in the season.

=== Race classification ===
Drivers who scored championship points are denoted in bold.

| Pos | No | Driver | Constructor | Laps | Time/Retired | Grid | Points |
|---|---|---|---|---|---|---|---|
| 1 | 8 | (Spain) **Fernando Alonso** | **Ferrari** | 67 | 1:27:38.864 | 2 | **25**^{1} |
| 2 | 7 | (Brazil) **Felipe Massa** | **Ferrari** | 67 | +4.196 | 3 | **18**^{1} |
| 3 | 5 | (Germany) **Sebastian Vettel** | **Red Bull-Renault** | 67 | +5.121 | 1 | **15** |
| 4 | 2 | (United Kingdom) **Lewis Hamilton** | **McLaren-Mercedes** | 67 | +26.896 | 6 | **12** |
| 5 | 1 | (United Kingdom) **Jenson Button** | **McLaren-Mercedes** | 67 | +29.482 | 5 | **10** |
| 6 | 6 | (Australia) **Mark Webber** | **Red Bull-Renault** | 67 | +43.606 | 4 | **8** |
| 7 | 11 | (Poland) **Robert Kubica** | **Renault** | 66 | +1 Lap | 7 | **6** |
| 8 | 4 | (Germany) **Nico Rosberg** | **Mercedes** | 66 | +1 Lap | 9 | **4** |
| 9 | 3 | (Germany) **Michael Schumacher** | **Mercedes** | 66 | +1 Lap | 11 | **2** |
| 10 | 12 | (Russia) **Vitaly Petrov** | **Renault** | 66 | +1 Lap | 13 | **1** |
| 11 | 23 | (Japan) Kamui Kobayashi | BMW Sauber-Ferrari | 66 | +1 Lap | 12 | |
| 12 | 9 | (Brazil) Rubens Barrichello | Williams-Cosworth | 66 | +1 Lap | 8 | |
| 13 | 10 | (Germany) Nico Hülkenberg | Williams-Cosworth | 66 | +1 Lap | 10 | |
| 14 | 22 | (Spain) Pedro de la Rosa | BMW Sauber-Ferrari | 66 | +1 Lap | 14 | |
| 15 | 17 | (Spain) Jaime Alguersuari | Toro Rosso-Ferrari | 66 | +1 Lap | 15 | |
| 16 | 15 | (Italy) Vitantonio Liuzzi | Force India-Mercedes | 65 | +2 Laps | 21 | |
| 17 | 14 | (Germany) Adrian Sutil | Force India-Mercedes | 65 | +2 Laps | 19 | |
| 18 | 24 | (Germany) Timo Glock | Virgin-Cosworth | 64 | +3 Laps | 23 | |
| 19 | 21 | (Brazil) Bruno Senna | HRT-Cosworth | 63 | +4 Laps | 20 | |
| Ret | 19 | (Finland) Heikki Kovalainen | Lotus-Cosworth | 56 | Collision damage | 18 | |
| Ret | 25 | (Brazil) Lucas di Grassi | Virgin-Cosworth | 50 | Suspension | 24 | |
| Ret | 20 | (Japan) Sakon Yamamoto | HRT-Cosworth | 19 | Gearbox | 22 | |
| Ret | 18 | (Italy) Jarno Trulli | Lotus-Cosworth | 3 | Gearbox | 17 | |
| Ret | 16 | (Switzerland) Sébastien Buemi | Toro Rosso-Ferrari | 1 | Collision damage | 16 | |

Notes

- **^1** – Ferrari were called before the Race Stewards after the race, and were found guilty of breaching Article 39.1 of the FIA Sporting Regulations, in relation to team orders and Article 151c of the FIA International Sporting Code for bringing the sport into disrepute. The result stood, although Ferrari were fined US$100,000 and the matter was referred to the FIA World Motor Sport Council.

== Championship standings after the race ==
Drivers' Championship standings

| Pos. | Driver | Points |
|---|---|---|
| 1 | (United Kingdom) Lewis Hamilton | 157 |
| 2 | (United Kingdom) Jenson Button | 143 |
| 3 | (Australia) Mark Webber | 136 |
| 4 | (Germany) Sebastian Vettel | 136 |
| 5 | (Spain) Fernando Alonso | 123 |

Constructors' Championship standings

| Pos. | Constructor | Points |
|---|---|---|
| 1 | (United Kingdom) McLaren-Mercedes | 300 |
| 2 | (Austria) Red Bull-Renault | 272 |
| 3 | (Italy) Ferrari | 208 |
| 4 | (Germany) Mercedes | 132 |
| 5 | (France) Renault | 96 |

- Note: Only the top five positions are included for both sets of standings.

== See also ==
- 2010 Hockenheimring GP2 Series round
- 2010 Hockenheimring GP3 Series round

| Previous race: 2010 British Grand Prix | FIA Formula One World Championship; 2010 season | Next race: 2010 Hungarian Grand Prix |
| Previous race: 2009 German Grand Prix | German Grand Prix | Next race: 2011 German Grand Prix |
