= 2010 British Grand Prix =

Race 10 of 19 in the 2010 Formula One World Championship
| ← Previous race | Next race → |
- Silverstone Circuit

Race details
- Date: 11 July 2010
- Official name: 2010 Formula 1 Santander British Grand Prix
- Location: Silverstone Circuit, Northamptonshire and Buckinghamshire, England
- Course: Permanent racing facility
- Course length: 5.901 km (3.667 miles)
- Distance: 52 laps, 306.747 km (190.604 miles)
- Weather: Mainly sunny

Pole position
| Driver | (Germany) Sebastian Vettel | Red Bull-Renault |
- Time: 1:29.615

Fastest lap
| Driver | (Spain) Fernando Alonso | Ferrari |
- Time: 1:30.874 on lap 52

Podium
| First | (Australia) Mark Webber | Red Bull-Renault |
| Second | (United Kingdom) Lewis Hamilton | McLaren-Mercedes |
| Third | (Germany) Nico Rosberg | Mercedes |

The 2010 British Grand Prix (formally the 2010 Formula 1 Santander British Grand Prix) was the tenth race of the 2010 Formula One season. On 7 December 2009, it was confirmed that the race would take place at Silverstone for the next seventeen years after the failure of Donington Park to raise the necessary funds to hold the race. The event was staged on 11 July, the same day as the 2010 FIFA World Cup final (as also happened in 1990, 1998 and 2026). The race was won by Red Bull driver Mark Webber, taking his third victory of the season.

This was the last time until the 2014 Japanese Grand Prix that Ferrari did not score a point.

== Race location ==
The 2009 British Grand Prix was due to be the last held at the Silverstone Circuit. Donington Park was due to hold the race from 2010 but was unable to find the money to redevelop its circuit due to financial problems. On 29 October 2009 Bernie Ecclestone confirmed that Donington Park would not host the British Grand Prix. Silverstone subsequently signed a 17-year deal to hold the race from 2010 onwards. Under this deal, the pit lane and paddock will be redeveloped with work starting as soon as possible after Christmas 2009 to be completed in 2011. The new track layout for the race featured a new complex of corners known as the "Arena" layout. The new corners from Abbey have been named; Farm, Village, The Loop, Aintree and the Wellington Straight leading to Brooklands on the old layout. This was also the last race to use the pit complex between Woodcote and Copse corners; the basic structure of the new complex was visible between Club and Abbey, and was used for the first time the following year.

== Report ==
=== Background ===
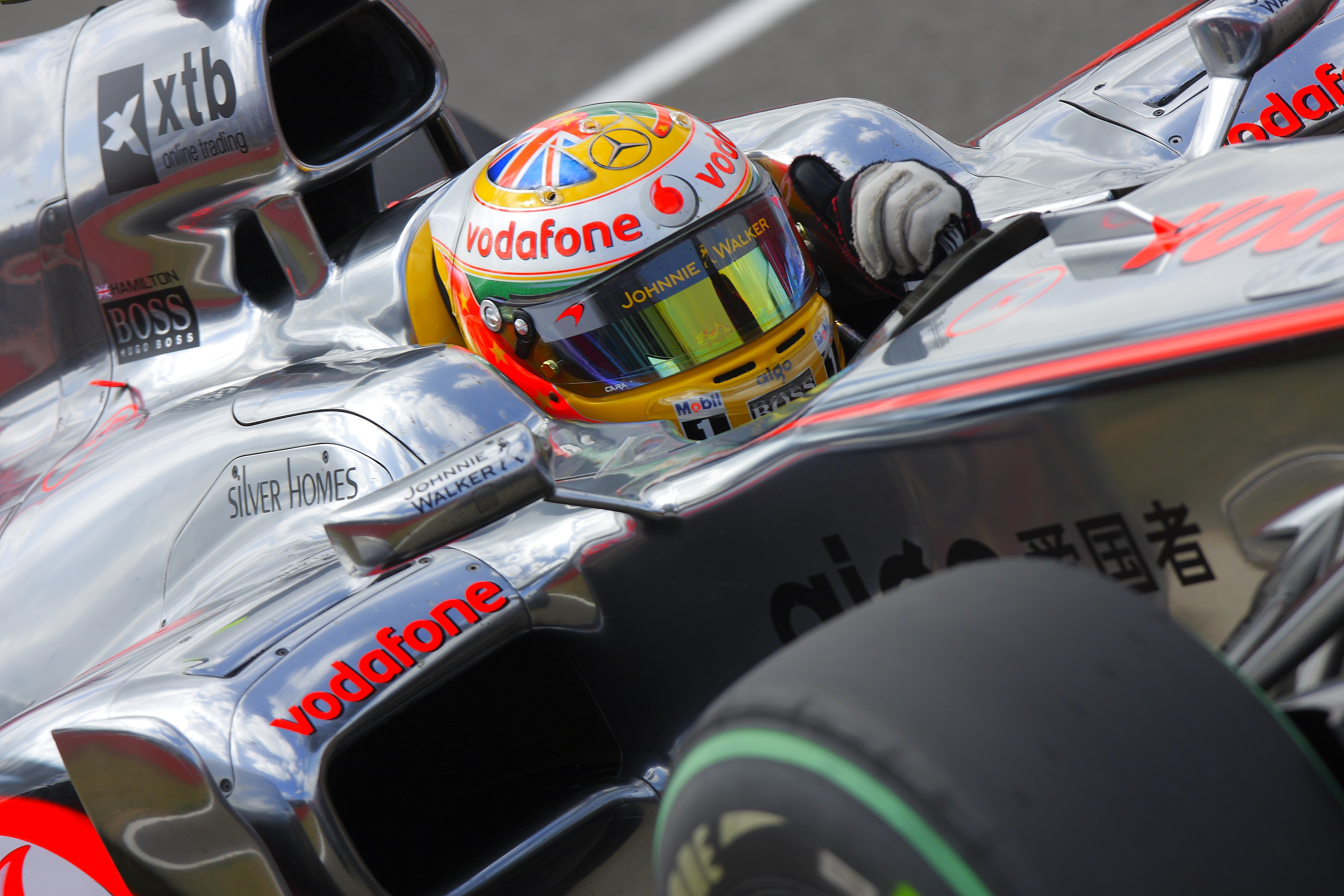
Lewis Hamilton wore a special helmet design to show his ancestry.

Sakon Yamamoto returned to a race seat after Hispania Racing decided to drop Bruno Senna in favour of the former Super Aguri and Spyker driver for reasons that remained undisclosed as the weekend began. Team principal Colin Kolles claimed that the switch was not related to sponsorship; the only new sponsor for the team was the Jaypee Group, owners of the new Jaypee Group Circuit in India, and attracted to the team by Karun Chandhok. Senna refused to speak on the subject, whilst Yamamoto claimed he would "talk" to the Brazilian driver, prompting speculation that the team was experiencing internal troubles and that Yamamoto's appointment had come after Senna had criticised the team in an internal e-mail. Nevertheless, the team refused to comment on why the change had been made and confirmed that Senna would return to his seat at Hockenheim.

Other line-up changes for the first practice session saw Paul di Resta stand in for Vitantonio Liuzzi at Force India and Fairuz Fauzy take over Jarno Trulli's driving duties at Lotus. The race also saw Virgin bring their most significant upgrade of the season, whilst Lotus brought their final update for 2010 as the team shifted its focus to the 2011 car. Meanwhile, McLaren introduced their interpretation of the blown diffuser concept pioneered by Red Bull at the start of the season and debuted by Ferrari and Mercedes at the European Grand Prix, only for the Woking-based team to abandon it after struggling during Friday practice.

The new addition to the circuit was well-received, but several drivers requested that changes be made to the high kerbs through the Maggotts-Becketts complex, one of the fastest corner combinations on the Formula One calendar.

The drivers' representative on the stewards' panel was Nigel Mansell.

=== Free practice ===
The Friday free practice sessions marked the first time the drivers experienced the new layout. The reception was mixed, with Mark Webber and Fernando Alonso enthusiastic about it, while Robert Kubica and Heikki Kovalainen expressed a preference for the older circuit. Almost every driver commented on a large bump on the approach to the reprofiled Abbey turn, with some drivers claiming it was potentially better than Copse corner.

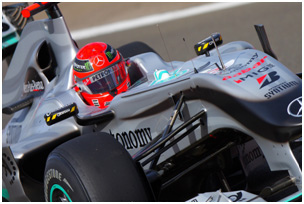
Many drivers, including Michael Schumacher, were caught out by the new Abbey layout.

The Friday sessions were once again dominated by the Red Bulls, with Vettel posting the fastest time in the first session and Webber in the second. The new layout caught several drivers out, with Lewis Hamilton and Michael Schumacher running wide at Abbey. Whether a byproduct of the new layout or another factor, the Friday session produced some unusual times, with the Ferraris of Alonso and Massa struggling to find any real pace in the first session, whilst Renault's Vitaly Petrov was quicker than teammate Kubica. In both sessions, just four drivers were within a second of the leader. Elsewhere, the new teams experienced troubles. While Lotus' Heikki Kovalainen slowly ate away at the difference to the established teams, Sakon Yamamoto was the slowest of the twenty-four drivers, seven and a half seconds off the pace. After surrendering his car to test driver Fairuz Fauzy for the first session, Jarno Trulli was hampered by reliability problems and limiting his time on the new layout before Kovalainen's car expired on the circuit late in the session.

The third and final session on Saturday morning continued the trend, with Sebastian Vettel returning to the top of the time sheets, with Mark Webber a close second; both drivers were the only two men to break the 1min 31sec barrier all weekend. Several drivers were hampered with mechanical issues, with Trulli losing more time to hydraulics problems, as did Adrian Sutil. Timo Glock also had little on-track time after this VR-01 fell victim to a throttle problem. Vettel also suffered his own mechanical problem when his front wing detached itself on the high-speed approach to Abbey late in the hour. The young German driver was able to slow the car down and prevent an accident, and his time remained unbeaten for the last few minutes of the session.

=== Qualifying ===
The beginning of qualifying was marked by controversy following Vettel's wing failure. Red Bull had brought a new aerodynamic package to the race that included a new front wing, and team principal Christian Horner made the decision to remove the new front wing from Webber's car and give it to Vettel. This prompted an angry outburst from the Australian, with public perception being that Red Bull had robbed Webber for the sake of favouring Vettel, particularly following the aftermath of their collision in Istanbul. Otherwise, the first session saw the elimination of Jaime Alguersuari and the Lotuses, Virgins and Hispanias. Timo Glock edged out Kovalainen in the dying moments to qualify as the best of the newcomers, only to have Kovalainen take the place back moments later.

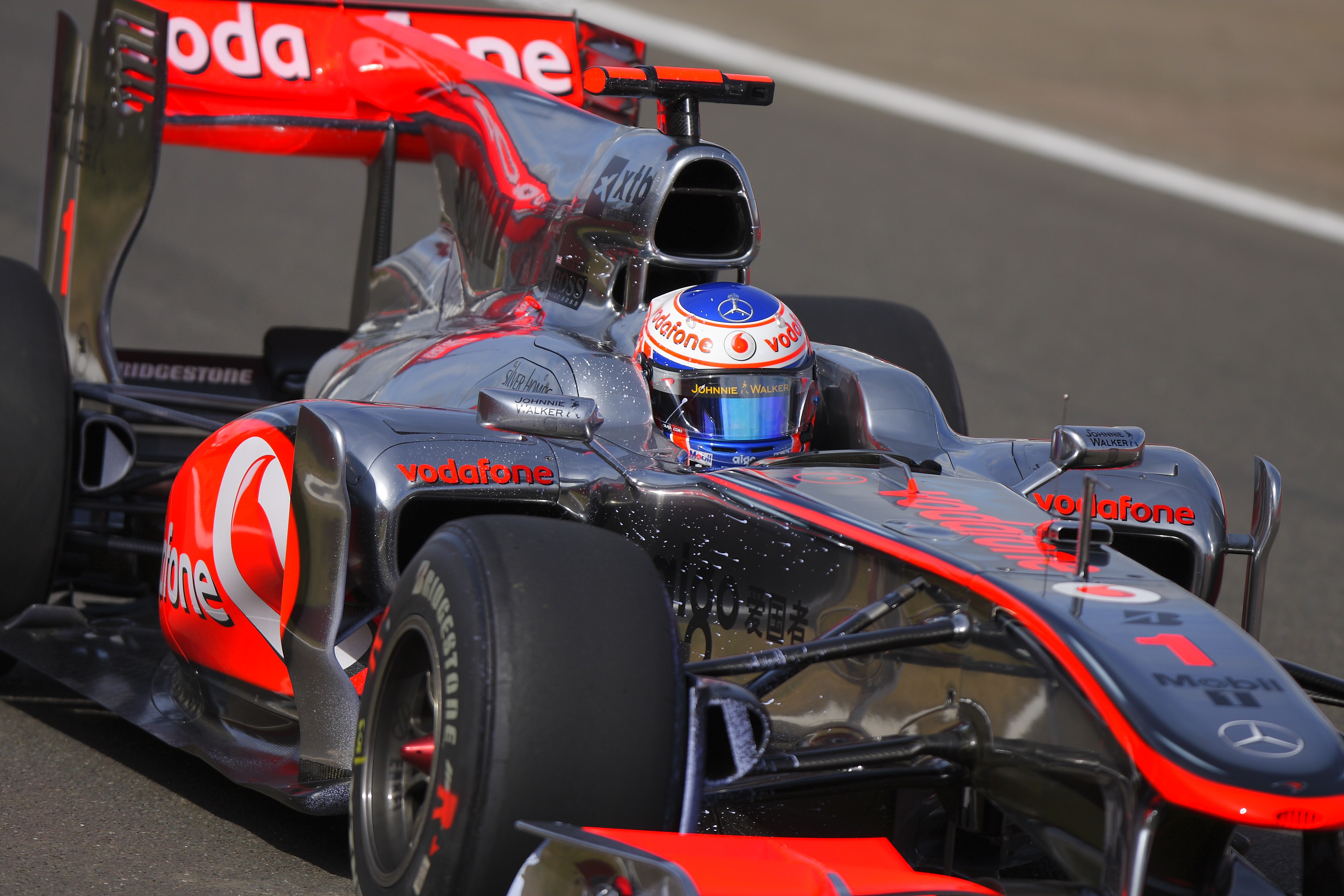
Jenson Button qualified in fourteenth after struggling to find the correct balance with his car.

The second session saw the elimination of Jenson Button, with commentator Martin Brundle noting that the McLaren MP4-25 was incredibly rough over the bumps in the circuit, particularly on the approach to the new section. The Renaults of Robert Kubica and Vitaly Petrov also struggled despite their promising form in practice, and while Kubica just made it through to Q3, Petrov's session ended early when the car developed a fuel problem. Although the team were able to get the Russian out for one final lap at the end of the session, it was a sedate effort that only elevated him to sixteenth. Following the worst qualifying performance of his career in Valencia, Michael Schumacher set the fifth-fastest time of the session, with the team attributing their recent run of poor results to upgrading the car without fully understanding the effects of their new parts. Vitantonio Liuzzi was issued with a five-place penalty after qualifying for impeding Nico Hülkenberg when the Italian violently cut across the Williams driver as he made a mistake at Abbey. At the end of the session, Adrian Sutil had qualified eleventh, ahead of Kamui Kobayashi, Hülkenberg, Button, Petrov and Sébastien Buemi, with Liuzzi relegated to twentieth place after his penalty.

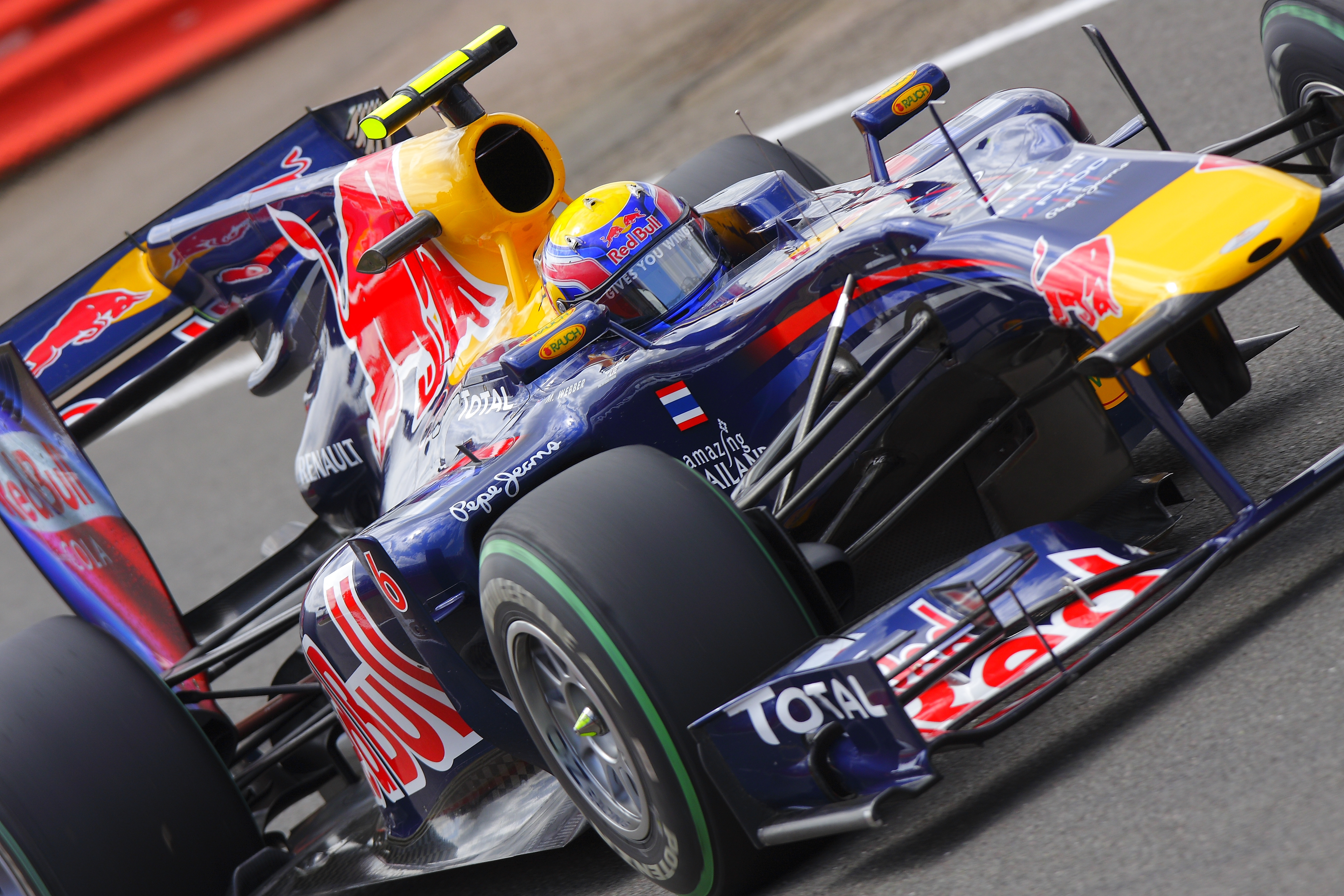
Mark Webber was fractionally out-qualified by teammate Sebastian Vettel and lined up second.

The final session was dominated by Red Bull, with Vettel and Webber going blow-for-blow. The German prevailed by a tenth of a second, prompting Webber's outburst, with the Australian expressing extreme dissatisfaction with lining up on the dirty side of the grid, which had traditionally been a bad starting place at Silverstone. Fernando Alonso out-qualified Lewis Hamilton after the Briton somehow managed to overcome the troubles experienced by teammate Button, with Nico Rosberg fifth. Despite earlier problems – suspected of being related to the car being caught in a crosswind – Robert Kubica managed sixth ahead of Felipe Massa, Rubens Barrichello and Pedro de la Rosa, the Spaniard's first time in Q3 all season. Michael Schumacher had to settle for the tenth and final place on the grid after only doing one lap as he had only had one set of tyres left over.

In addition to Liuzzi's penalty, Jaime Alguersuari was fined five thousand dollars for an unsafe pit release, and Sakon Yamamoto was warned for slowing other drivers.

=== Race ===
The race began with pole-sitter Sebastian Vettel pressuring teammate Mark Webber on the approach to Copse, but the Australian had made the better start and managed to claim the lead into the first corner. Vettel ran wide after contact with third-placed driver Lewis Hamilton, whose front wing clipped Vettel's right-rear tyre. As the field passed through the Maggotts-Becketts section, Vettel struggled for control and ran off track, having picked up a puncture seemingly caused by the contact with Hamilton. Another first-lap incident saw Felipe Massa also suffer a puncture after making contact with teammate Fernando Alonso. Both Massa and Vettel were forced to pit, dropping them to the back of the field.

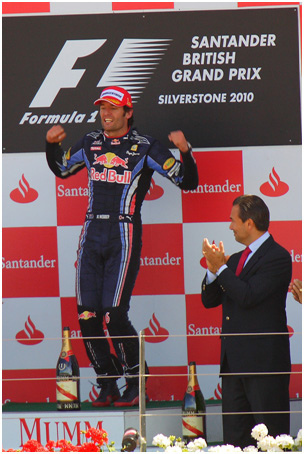
Mark Webber claimed victory for the third time in 2010.

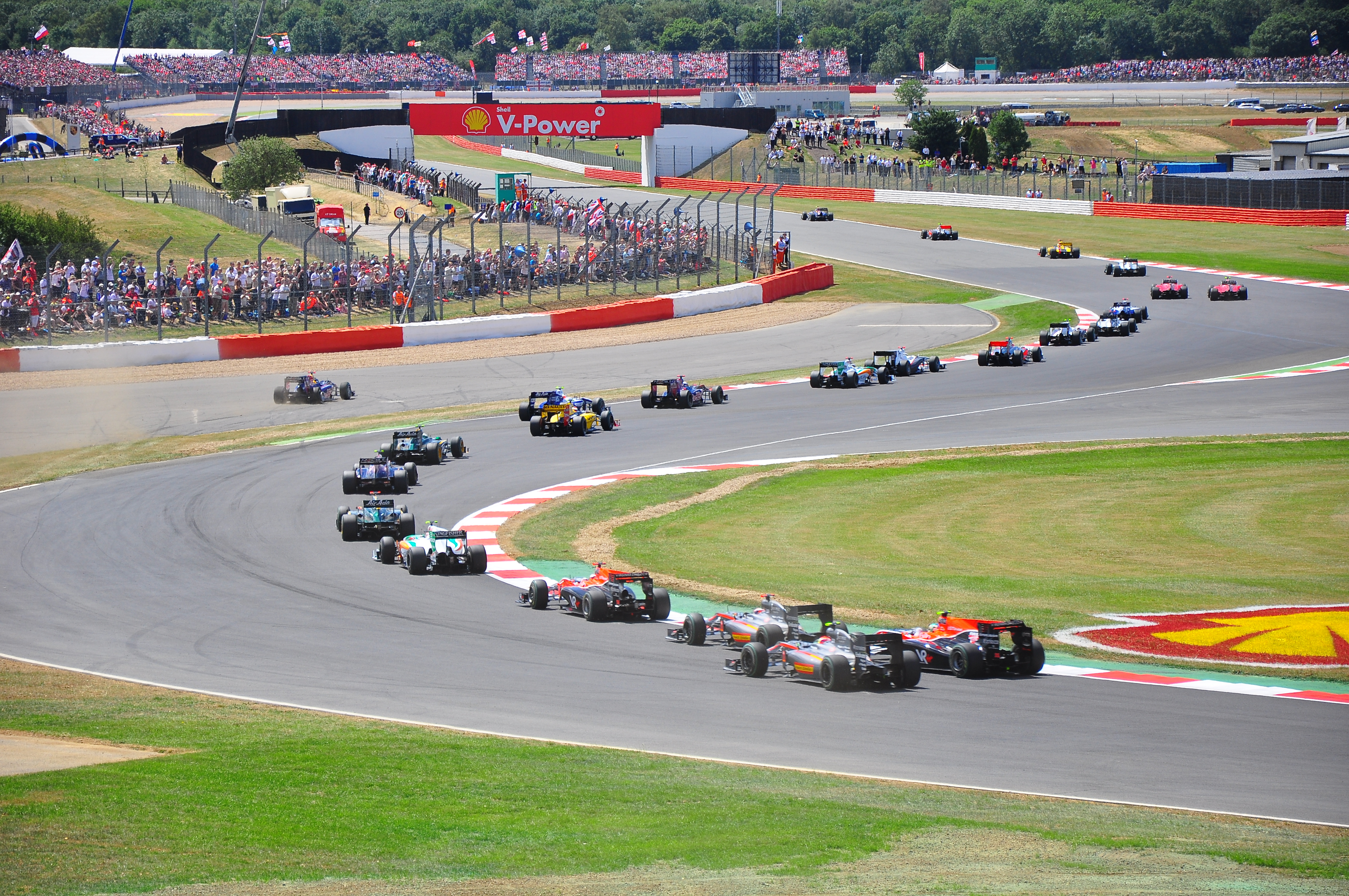
Sebastian Vettel runs wide with a punctured tyre as the field goes through the Maggotts-Becketts complex of corners on the first lap.

The first casualty of the race was Lucas di Grassi, his Virgin car once again crippled by a hydraulics failure. At the front, Hamilton kept in touch with Webber as they raced on the softer tyre, while his teammate Jenson Button worked his way through the field, having started fourteenth.

The early phase of the race saw a controversial moment as Fernando Alonso attempted to pass Robert Kubica on the entry to Vale. Alonso left the track as Kubica defended his position, passing the Polish driver in the process. Alonso was subsequently awarded a drive-through penalty for failing to give the place back to Kubica. Adrian Sutil then came together with Pedro de la Rosa on the main straight, scattering debris on the racing line. Although both drivers were able to continue for the time being, de la Rosa's rear wing was damaged and began to disintegrate as the Sauber took to the Hangar straight. He pitted and was released back into the race, but the damage proved terminal and de la Rosa was forced to retire.

The debris on the circuit prompted the deployment of the safety car, bunching the field back up. This compounded Alonso's problems as he was not allowed to serve his drive-through penalty while the safety car was deployed. Alonso served his penalty as soon as the safety car was withdrawn, but the now bunched pack saw him plummet down the order. Some commentators saw it as a harsh penalty, notably because Kubica had been forced to retire from the race shortly after the controversial overtake due to a driveshaft issue. Others were less sympathetic, feeling that Alonso could have avoided trouble by giving the place back to Kubica at the earliest opportunity. Charlie Whiting, the FIA's race director, later told reporters that Alonso and Ferrari had been advised to yield to Kubica as soon as the Spaniard had passed the Renault, and twice more after that before the penalty was issued. Ferrari later released a timeline of the Alonso-Kubica pass and following events, showing that Charlie Whiting had told them he "had to look at pictures" and did not recommend Alonso return the position until a full two minutes after the controversial pass, critically after Alonso had already passed another car in Jaime Alguersuari.

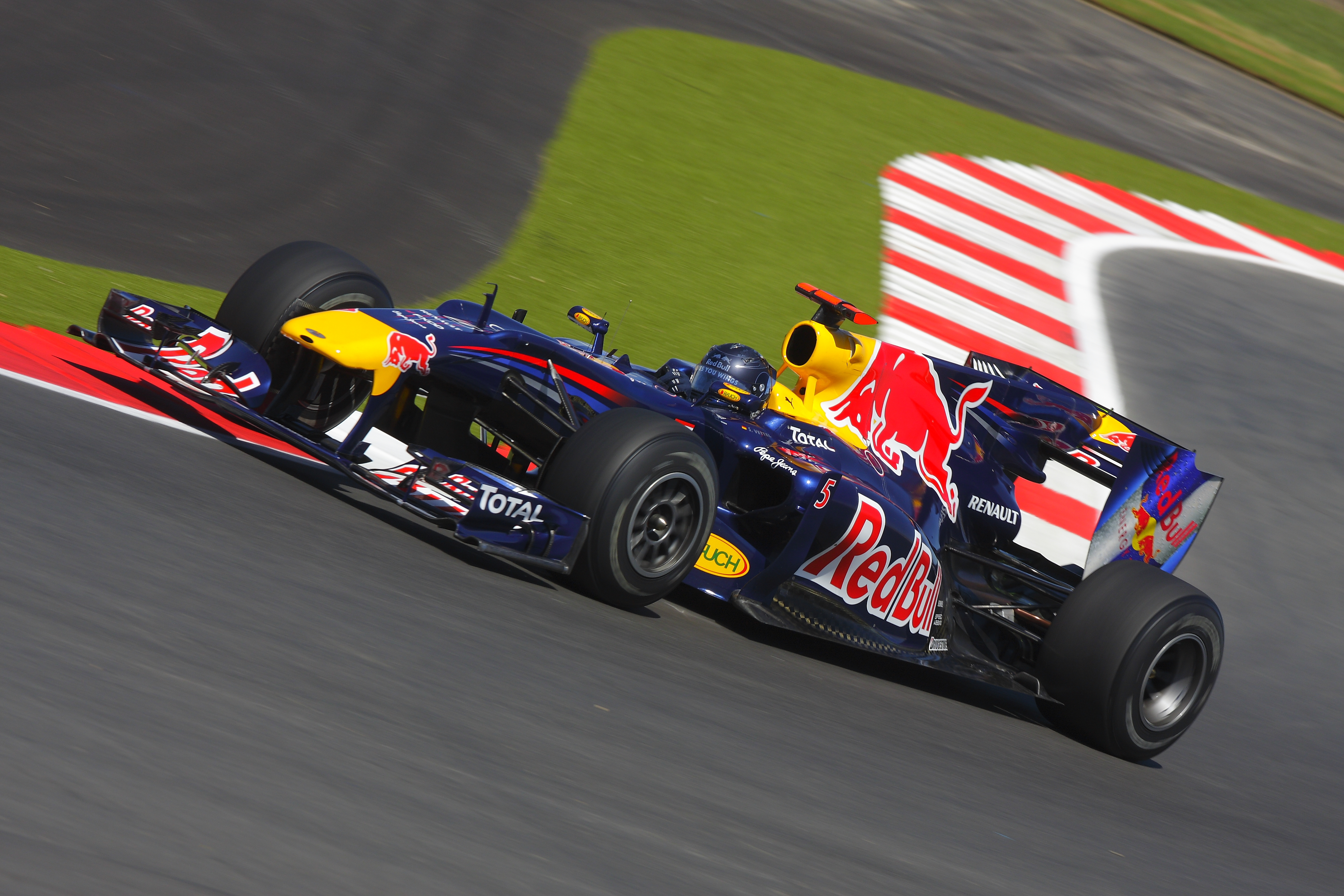
After his first-lap puncture, Sebastian Vettel recovered to finish the race in seventh place.

With the safety car bunching up the field, Vettel – who had at one point been just three seconds ahead of race leader Webber and in danger of being lapped – was able to join the back of the safety car train. After the restart, Vettel began a charge through the field, quickly completing several overtakes that moved him into the points-scoring positions. Several other battles also picked up, with Alonso and Liuzzi banging wheels and Vitaly Petrov threatening Nico Hülkenberg's tenth place until the Russian driver developed a slow puncture that forced him to pit. Vettel's recovery charge continued, although it was made more complicated by the retirement of Jaime Alguersuari, whose Toro Rosso became beached on the outside of Luffield with eight laps remaining. Marshalls waved yellow flags at the end of the Wellington Straight, denying Vettel an opportunity to pass Adrian Sutil into Brooklands. Vettel eventually completed a pass several laps later, forcing a gap at Aintree. Sutil came under further pressure from Michael Schumacher, who himself was being chased by Hülkenberg.

Red Bull's Mark Webber won the race, just over a second ahead of Lewis Hamilton's McLaren. Nico Rosberg claimed third place – Mercedes' first podium since the Chinese Grand Prix – with Jenson Button missing out on the rostrum by just half a second. Rubens Barrichello led Kamui Kobayashi across the line before the German quartet of Vettel, Sutil, Schumacher and Hülkenberg completed the points. The Ferraris of Alonso and Massa finished fourteenth and fifteenth, one minute down and the last drivers to finish on the lead lap. Jarno Trulli was the first driver for the new teams to finish, ahead of teammate Kovalainen, the sole surviving Virgin of Glock, and the two Hispanias.

=== Post-race ===
Race winner Mark Webber was still outspoken about the apparent favouritism within the Red Bull team; his first words after crossing the line were, "Fantastic, guys, not bad for a number two driver. Cheers.", prompting a response of "maybe you can smile now?" from Red Bull team principal Christian Horner. Webber also asked for his race engineer to be the team employee to join him on the podium, however Red Bull instead sent a member of their chassis design team. In the press conference he expressed dissatisfaction with the team, claiming that he never would have signed a contract for 2011 if he had known he would have been treated the way he had been. Elsewhere, Ferrari and Alonso accepted their penalty for the pass on Kubica, claiming that if harsh penalties were to be issued, then Silverstone was an example of how it should be done, briefly reigniting the controversy associated with the previous race.

Hamilton maintained in the lead of the World Drivers' Championship, extending his advantage over teammate Button to twelve points, while the Red Bull duo Webber and Vettel swapped places, with third place now being occupied by Webber as the Australian trailed Hamilton by a total of 17 points. The top five in the Constructors' Championship remained unchanged, with McLaren being 29 points clear of their nearest rival Red Bull.

== Classification ==
=== Qualifying ===
| Pos | No | Driver | Constructor | Part 1 | Part 2 | Part 3 | Grid |
|---|---|---|---|---|---|---|---|
| 1 | 5 | (Germany) Sebastian Vettel | Red Bull-Renault | 1:30.841 | 1:30.480 | 1:29.615 | 1 |
| 2 | 6 | (Australia) Mark Webber | Red Bull-Renault | 1:30.858 | 1:30.114 | 1:29.758 | 2 |
| 3 | 8 | (Spain) Fernando Alonso | Ferrari | 1:30.997 | 1:30.700 | 1:30.426 | 3 |
| 4 | 2 | (United Kingdom) Lewis Hamilton | McLaren-Mercedes | 1:31.297 | 1:31.118 | 1:30.556 | 4 |
| 5 | 4 | (Germany) Nico Rosberg | Mercedes | 1:31.626 | 1:31.085 | 1:30.625 | 5 |
| 6 | 11 | (Poland) Robert Kubica | Renault | 1:31.680 | 1:31.344 | 1:31.040 | 6 |
| 7 | 7 | (Brazil) Felipe Massa | Ferrari | 1:31.313 | 1:31.010 | 1:31.172 | 7 |
| 8 | 9 | (Brazil) Rubens Barrichello | Williams-Cosworth | 1:31.424 | 1:31.126 | 1:31.175 | 8 |
| 9 | 22 | (Spain) Pedro de la Rosa | BMW Sauber-Ferrari | 1:31.533 | 1:31.327 | 1:31.274 | 9 |
| 10 | 3 | (Germany) Michael Schumacher | Mercedes | 1:32.058 | 1:31.022 | 1:31.430 | 10 |
| 11 | 14 | (Germany) Adrian Sutil | Force India-Mercedes | 1:31.109 | 1:31.399 | | 11 |
| 12 | 23 | (Japan) Kamui Kobayashi | BMW Sauber-Ferrari | 1:31.851 | 1:31.421 | | 12 |
| 13 | 10 | (Germany) Nico Hülkenberg | Williams-Cosworth | 1:32.144 | 1:31.635 | | 13 |
| 14 | 1 | (United Kingdom) Jenson Button | McLaren-Mercedes | 1:31.435 | 1:31.699 | | 14 |
| 15 | 15 | (Italy) Vitantonio Liuzzi | Force India-Mercedes | 1:32.226 | 1:31.708 | | 20^{1} |
| 16 | 12 | (Russia) Vitaly Petrov | Renault | 1:31.638 | 1:31.796 | | 15 |
| 17 | 16 | (Switzerland) Sébastien Buemi | Toro Rosso-Ferrari | 1:31.901 | 1:32.012 | | 16 |
| 18 | 17 | (Spain) Jaime Alguersuari | Toro Rosso-Ferrari | 1:32.430 | | | 17 |
| 19 | 19 | (Finland) Heikki Kovalainen | Lotus-Cosworth | 1:34.405 | | | 18 |
| 20 | 24 | (Germany) Timo Glock | Virgin-Cosworth | 1:34.775 | | | 19 |
| 21 | 18 | (Italy) Jarno Trulli | Lotus-Cosworth | 1:34.864 | | | 21 |
| 22 | 25 | (Brazil) Lucas di Grassi | Virgin-Cosworth | 1:35.212 | | | 22 |
| 23 | 20 | (India) Karun Chandhok | HRT-Cosworth | 1:36.576 | | | 23 |
| 24 | 21 | (Japan) Sakon Yamamoto | HRT-Cosworth | 1:36.968 | | | 24 |

Notes:

1. – Vitantonio Liuzzi was demoted five places on the grid after he was penalised for impeding Nico Hülkenberg.

=== Race ===
| Pos | No | Driver | Constructor | Laps | Time/Retired | Grid | Points |
|---|---|---|---|---|---|---|---|
| 1 | 6 | (Australia) Mark Webber | Red Bull-Renault | 52 | 1:24:38.200 | 2 | 25 |
| 2 | 2 | (United Kingdom) Lewis Hamilton | McLaren-Mercedes | 52 | +1.360 | 4 | 18 |
| 3 | 4 | (Germany) Nico Rosberg | Mercedes | 52 | +21.307 | 5 | 15 |
| 4 | 1 | (United Kingdom) Jenson Button | McLaren-Mercedes | 52 | +21.986 | 14 | 12 |
| 5 | 9 | (Brazil) Rubens Barrichello | Williams-Cosworth | 52 | +31.456 | 8 | 10 |
| 6 | 23 | (Japan) Kamui Kobayashi | BMW Sauber-Ferrari | 52 | +32.171 | 12 | 8 |
| 7 | 5 | (Germany) Sebastian Vettel | Red Bull-Renault | 52 | +36.734 | 1 | 6 |
| 8 | 14 | (Germany) Adrian Sutil | Force India-Mercedes | 52 | +40.932 | 11 | 4 |
| 9 | 3 | (Germany) Michael Schumacher | Mercedes | 52 | +41.599 | 10 | 2 |
| 10 | 10 | (Germany) Nico Hülkenberg | Williams-Cosworth | 52 | +42.012 | 13 | 1 |
| 11 | 15 | (Italy) Vitantonio Liuzzi | Force India-Mercedes | 52 | +42.459 | 20 | |
| 12 | 16 | (Switzerland) Sébastien Buemi | Toro Rosso-Ferrari | 52 | +47.627 | 16 | |
| 13 | 12 | (Russia) Vitaly Petrov | Renault | 52 | +59.374 | 15 | |
| 14 | 8 | (Spain) Fernando Alonso | Ferrari | 52 | +1:02.385 | 3 | |
| 15 | 7 | (Brazil) Felipe Massa | Ferrari | 52 | +1:07.489 | 7 | |
| 16 | 18 | (Italy) Jarno Trulli | Lotus-Cosworth | 51 | +1 Lap | 21 | |
| 17 | 19 | (Finland) Heikki Kovalainen | Lotus-Cosworth | 51 | +1 Lap | 18 | |
| 18 | 24 | (Germany) Timo Glock | Virgin-Cosworth | 50 | +2 Laps | 19 | |
| 19 | 20 | (India) Karun Chandhok | HRT-Cosworth | 50 | +2 Laps | 23 | |
| 20 | 21 | (Japan) Sakon Yamamoto | HRT-Cosworth | 50 | +2 Laps | 24 | |
| Ret | 17 | (Spain) Jaime Alguersuari | Toro Rosso-Ferrari | 44 | Brakes | 17 | |
| Ret | 22 | (Spain) Pedro de la Rosa | BMW Sauber-Ferrari | 29 | Rear wing | 9 | |
| Ret | 11 | (Poland) Robert Kubica | Renault | 19 | Driveshaft | 6 | |
| Ret | 25 | (Brazil) Lucas di Grassi | Virgin-Cosworth | 9 | Hydraulics | 22 | |

== Championship standings after the race ==
Drivers' Championship standings

| | Pos. | Driver | Points |
|---|---|---|---|
| | 1 | (United Kingdom) Lewis Hamilton | 145 |
| | 2 | (United Kingdom) Jenson Button | 133 |
| 1 | 3 | (Australia) Mark Webber | 128 |
| 1 | 4 | (Germany) Sebastian Vettel | 121 |
| | 5 | (Spain) Fernando Alonso | 98 |

Constructors' Championship standings

| Pos. | Constructor | Points |
|---|---|---|
| 1 | (United Kingdom) McLaren-Mercedes | 278 |
| 2 | (Austria) Red Bull-Renault | 249 |
| 3 | (Italy) Ferrari | 165 |
| 4 | (Germany) Mercedes | 126 |
| 5 | (France) Renault | 89 |

- Note: Only the top five positions are included for both sets of standings.

== See also ==
- 2010 Silverstone GP2 Series round
- 2010 Silverstone GP3 Series round

| Previous race: 2010 European Grand Prix | FIA Formula One World Championship; 2010 season | Next race: 2010 German Grand Prix |
| Previous race: 2009 British Grand Prix | British Grand Prix | Next race: 2011 British Grand Prix |
