= 2010 European Grand Prix =

Formula One motor race held in 2010

Race 9 of 19 in the 2010 Formula One World Championship
← Previous race	Next race →
- The Valencia Street Circuit

Race details
- Date: 27 June 2010
- Official name: 2010 Formula 1 Telefónica Grand Prix of Europe
- Location: Valencia Street Circuit, Valencia, Spain
- Course: Temporary street circuit
- Course length: 5.419 km (3.367 miles)
- Distance: 57 laps, 308.883 km (191.931 miles)
- Weather: Dry

Pole position
Driver	(Germany) Sebastian Vettel	Red Bull-Renault
- Time: 1:37.587

Fastest lap
Driver	(United Kingdom) Jenson Button	McLaren-Mercedes
- Time: 1:38.766 on lap 54

Podium
First	(Germany) Sebastian Vettel	Red Bull-Renault
Second	(United Kingdom) Lewis Hamilton	McLaren-Mercedes
Third	(United Kingdom) Jenson Button	McLaren-Mercedes

The 2010 European Grand Prix (formally the 2010 Formula 1 Telefónica Grand Prix of Europe) was a Formula One motor race held on 27 June at the Valencia Street Circuit in Valencia, Spain. It was the ninth round of the 2010 Formula One World Championship. Red Bull driver Sebastian Vettel won the 57-lap race from pole position. Lewis Hamilton finished second for the McLaren team and his teammate Jenson Button was third. It was Vettel's second win of the season and the seventh of his Formula One career.

Hamilton led the World Drivers' Championship from teammate Button going into the race while their team McLaren led the World Constructors' Championship. Vettel achieved pole position by setting the fastest lap time in the third qualifying session and maintained his advantage heading into the first corner and resisted Hamilton's attempts to pass him. The safety car was deployed following a large accident involving Vettel's teammate Mark Webber and Heikki Kovalainen on the ninth lap. Hamilton passed the safety car and was later issued with a drive-through penalty for which he served on lap 27. Vettel remained the leader at the restart despite running deep in the track's final corner. Hamilton drew closer to Vettel but he was unable to get close and Vettel maintained the lead for the remainder of the race to win.

As a consequence of the race, Hamilton extended his lead in the World Drivers' Championship to six championship points ahead of teammate Button. This ensured the pair would enter the next, and their home race – the British Grand Prix – as first and second in the championship. Vettel's victory elevated him to third; he was six championship points behind Button after surpassing the totals of teammate Webber and Fernando Alonso. By gaining the most championship points from the race, McLaren extended their lead in the World Constructors' Championship to 30 over Red Bull.

== Background ==
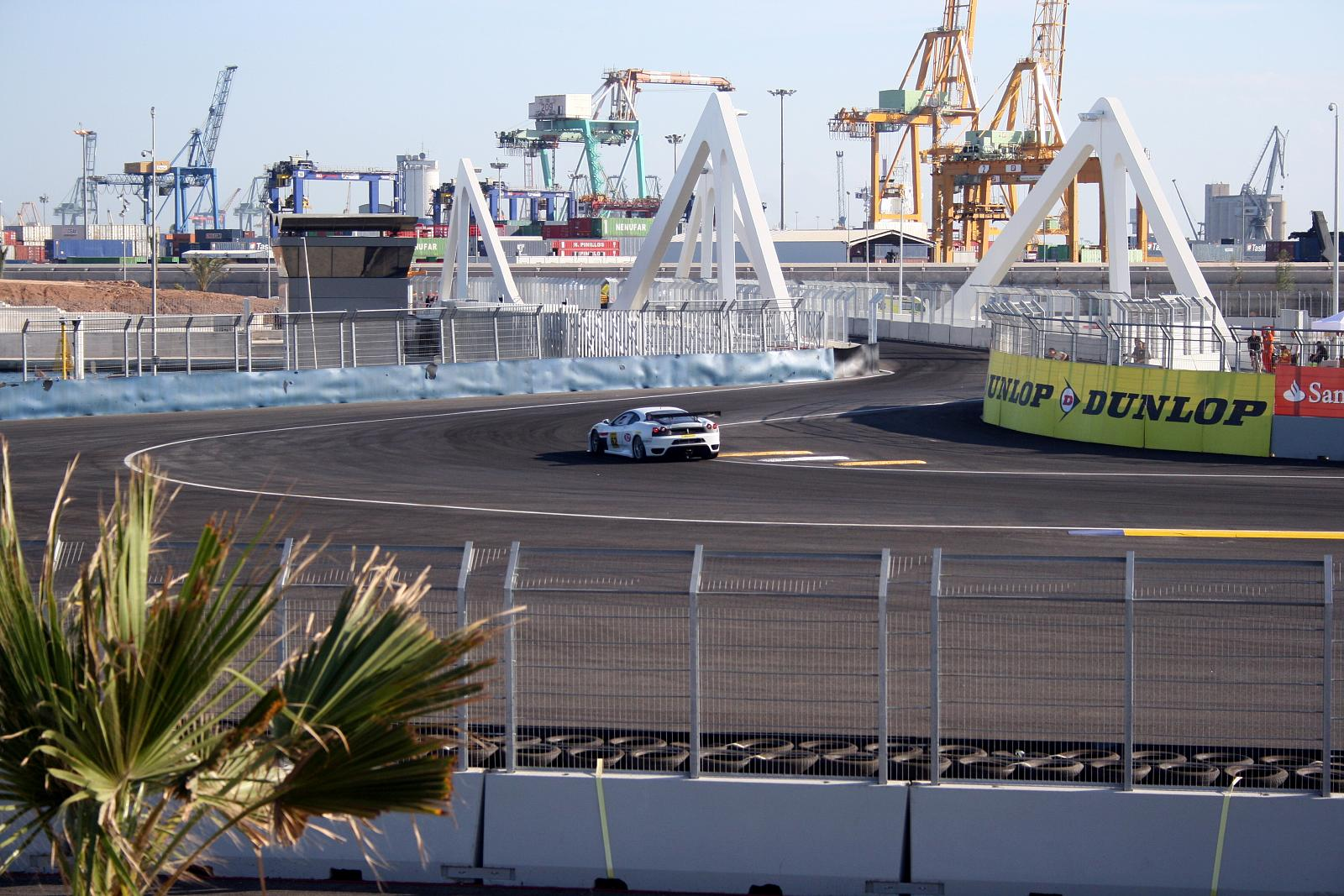
Valencia Street Circuit, where the race was held.

The 2010 European Grand Prix was the ninth out of 19 scheduled rounds of the 2010 Formula One World Championship, and was held on 27 June at the Valencia Street Circuit in Valencia, Spain. Tyre supplier Bridgestone brought two types of tyre to the race; two soft compounds (super soft "options" and medium "primes"). The super soft tyres were identified by a green stripe on their side-walls.

Before the race McLaren driver Lewis Hamilton led the World Drivers' Championship with 109 championship points, three championship points ahead of teammate Jenson Button in second, and Mark Webber in third. Fernando Alonso was fourth on 94 championship points, and Sebastian Vettel was four championship points behind in fifth place. McLaren were leading the World Constructors' Championship with 215 championship points; Red Bull and Ferrari were second and third with 193 and 161 championship points, while Mercedes (108) and Renault (79) contended for fourth place.

After winning the previous two races of the season which put him into the lead of the World Drivers' Championship, Hamilton said he did not fear a Red Bull resurgence in the following events having declared that the McLaren team was in a good state for the second half of the season. However, he did not consider himself a favourite to win the championship. Button became concerned that his team would lose its recent momentum but said he would get the maximum amount needed from his car to help him remain in contention. Despite being afflicted with reliability issues with his Red Bull car, Vettel said there was no reason for him or his team to panic and was looking forward to the European Grand Prix in Valencia. Alonso was optimistic that car updates to his Ferrari would allow him to become more competitive but was calm about his expectations.

Some teams made modifications to their cars in preparation for the event. Ferrari, Mercedes and Renault introduced diffuser designs similar to the Red Bull RB6. Ferrari's design largely changed the shape of their exhaust system, and introduced a new gearbox case for Felipe Massa's car to raise the pick-up points of its rear suspension to help him adjust to the changes. They constructed a larger radiator to deal with the additional heat. Mercedes elected not to bring a new gearbox casing, but introduced a new rear diffuser to fully utilise the air blowing from the car's exhaust. Renault's design had the exit of their car's exhaust which had thermal protection against high temperatures and the team introduced a new design of their gearbox casing to allow for the pick-up points for its rear suspension to be accommodated. After running the F-duct device (which increases a car's top speed) in Friday practice, Red Bull decided to use it for the remainder of the weekend.

Lotus celebrated the 500th Grand Prix for the brand. For this occasion, the team changed the usual decoration of its car, including the number 500 between laurels on both sides of the rear of the Lotus T127. The family of Colin Chapman, the founder of the original Team Lotus, attended this celebration.

== Practice ==
Per the regulations for the 2010 season, three practice sessions were held, two 90-minute sessions on Friday morning and afternoon and another 60-minute session on Saturday morning. Conditions were hot and sunny for the Friday practice sessions. Several drivers went off the track due to the track being dusty. Nico Rosberg recorded the first session's fastest lap with a time of 1:41.175, ahead of McLaren teammates Hamilton and Button. Robert Kubica, Massa, Vettel, Webber, Michael Schumacher, Alonso and Rubens Barrichello rounded out the session's top-ten drivers. Bruno Senna's left-side view mirror became detached from his Hispania F110, which grazed his helmet, and was run over by Sébastien Buemi heading into turn 12, which caused the session to be stopped to allow marshals to clear the track of debris.

In the second practice session, Alonso set the day's fastest lap of 1:39.283; Red Bull drivers Vettel and Webber finished with the second and third-fastest times. Rosberg, Hamilton, Kubica, Massa, Adrian Sutil, Button and Barrichello followed in the top-ten. Massa caused the session to be disrupted after spinning in the fourth corner and narrowly avoided making contact with a barrier. The session was stopped to allow Massa's car to be removed from the centre of the track for transport to the pit lane. Timo Glock's lost the use of his car's fifth gear and pulled over to the side of the track at turn 12 to prematurely end his running. Vitaly Petrov spun at the exit of turn 14 and reversed his car to rejoin the circuit, avoiding the need for a red-flag. Vettel was the fastest driver in the final practice session with a lap of 1:38.052; Webber was third-fastest. Kubica separated the two Red Bull drivers in second, with Sutil fourth. Alonso, Barrichello, Vitantonio Liuzzi, Massa, Button and Hamilton rounded out the top ten.

== Qualifying ==
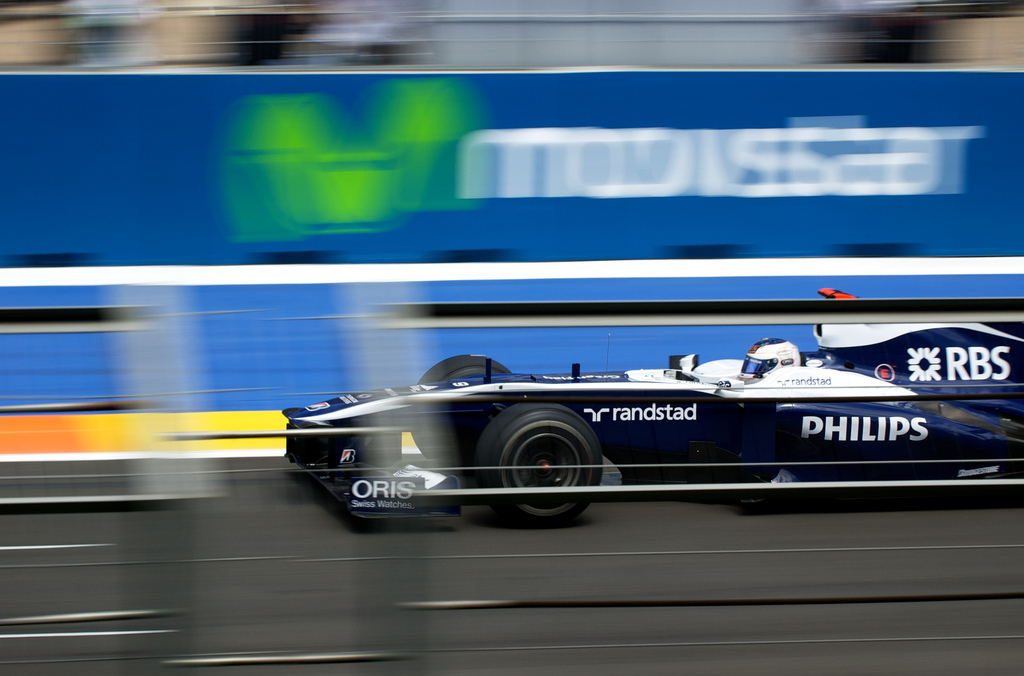
Rubens Barrichello qualified ninth and finished fourth, his best result of the season.

Saturday afternoon's qualifying session was divided into three parts. The first part ran for 20 minutes and eliminated the cars that finished 18th or lower. The second session lasted 15 minutes and eliminated cars that finished in positions 11 to 17. The final ten-minute session set pole position to 10th. Cars which competed in the final session were not allowed to change tyres before the race. They started the race fitted with the tyres on which they set their quickest lap times. Vettel set the fastest times in the second and third sessions to win his fourth pole position of the season with a time of 1:37.587. It was the Red Bull team's eighth pole in the season's nine races. He was joined on the grid's front row by Webber who recorded a lap time 0.075 seconds slower. Hamilton qualified third but locked his rear tyres on his final timed lap heading into turn 17 and slowed, preventing him from improving his grid position. The two Ferrari drivers were fourth and fifth (with Alonso ahead of Massa); Slower cars prevented Massa from gaining optimum tyre temperature and could not improve his fastest lap. Kubica took sixth position and felt more movement on his Renault when he had the medium compound tyres equipped. Button had oversteer through turn 24 and an error in the following corner restricted him to seventh. Nico Hülkenberg was eighth, ahead of Williams teammate Barrichello in ninth who had a brake-warm up problem. Petrov rounded out the top ten and mistakes on his final timed lap prevented him from obtaining a better starting position.

Buemi was the fastest driver not to advance into the final session; his best lap time of 1.38:586 was half a second off Vettel's pace in the second session. He was disappointed as he had Barrichello ahead of him driving towards turn 25 on his final timed lap which slowed Buemi and lost him two tenths of a second. Rosberg took 12th position. Sutil had no grip in his car and qualified in 13th. His teammate Liuzzi clinched 14th place after an oversteer and struggled on his car's soft tyres. Schumacher was unable to get his tyres working to his preference and had a right-front brake problem restricted him to qualifying in 15th. Schumacher's qualifying effort was criticised by the Formula One paddock. Pedro de la Rosa took 16th having struggled with a lack of grip on the super soft compound tyres. Jaime Alguersuari drove hard but a lack of top speed put him 17th. Kamui Kobayashi failed to advance beyond the first session; he flat-spotted his front super soft compound tyres on his first timed lap which caused him to feel vibrations in his car. The two Lotus cars of Jarno Trulli and Heikki Kovalainen qualified in 19th and 20th positions, ahead of both Virgin drivers Lucas di Grassi and Glock in 21st and 22nd. Both Hispania drivers lined up at the back of the field (with Karun Chandhok ahead of Senna).

=== Qualifying classification ===
The fastest lap in each of the three sessions is denoted in bold.

Pos	No	Driver	Constructor	Q1	Q2	Q3	Grid
1	5	(Germany) Sebastian Vettel	Red Bull-Renault	1:38.324	**1:38.015**	**1:37.587**	1
2	6	(Australia) Mark Webber	Red Bull-Renault	1:38.549	1:38.041	1:37.662	2
3	2	(United Kingdom) Lewis Hamilton	McLaren-Mercedes	1:38.697	1:38.158	1:37.969	3
4	8	(Spain) Fernando Alonso	Ferrari	1:38.472	1:38.179	1:38.075	4
5	7	(Brazil) Felipe Massa	Ferrari	1:38.657	1:38.046	1:38.127	5
6	11	(Poland) Robert Kubica	Renault	**1:38.132**	1:38.062	1:38.137	6
7	1	(United Kingdom) Jenson Button	McLaren-Mercedes	1:38.360	1:38.399	1:38.210	7
8	10	(Germany) Nico Hülkenberg	Williams-Cosworth	1:38.843	1:38.523	1:38.428	8
9	9	(Brazil) Rubens Barrichello	Williams-Cosworth	1:38.449	1:38.326	1:38.428	9
10	12	(Russia) Vitaly Petrov	Renault	1:39.004	1:38.552	1:38.523	10
11	16	(Switzerland) Sébastien Buemi	Toro Rosso-Ferrari	1:39.096	1:38.586	N/A	11
12	4	(Germany) Nico Rosberg	Mercedes	1:38.752	1:38.627	N/A	12
13	14	(Germany) Adrian Sutil	Force India-Mercedes	1:39.021	1:38.851	N/A	13
14	15	(Italy) Vitantonio Liuzzi	Force India-Mercedes	1:38.969	1:38.884	N/A	14
15	3	(Germany) Michael Schumacher	Mercedes	1:38.994	1:39.234	N/A	15
16	22	(Spain) Pedro de la Rosa	BMW Sauber-Ferrari	1:39.003	1:39.264	N/A	16
17	17	(Spain) Jaime Alguersuari	Toro Rosso-Ferrari	1:39.128	1:39.548	N/A	17
18	23	(Japan) Kamui Kobayashi	BMW Sauber-Ferrari	1:39.343	N/A	N/A	18
19	18	(Italy) Jarno Trulli	Lotus-Cosworth	1:40.658	N/A	N/A	19
20	19	(Finland) Heikki Kovalainen	Lotus-Cosworth	1:40.882	N/A	N/A	20
21	25	(Brazil) Lucas di Grassi	Virgin-Cosworth	1:42.086	N/A	N/A	21
22	24	(Germany) Timo Glock	Virgin-Cosworth	1:42.140	N/A	N/A	22
23	20	(India) Karun Chandhok	HRT-Cosworth	1:42.600	N/A	N/A	23
24	21	(Brazil) Bruno Senna	HRT-Cosworth	1:42.851	N/A	N/A	24

== Race ==
The race commenced at 14:00 Central European Summer Time (UTC+2). At the start, weather conditions were sunny and hot with an air temperature of 27 to 28 °C (81 to 82 °F) and a track temperature between 43 and 47 °C (109 and 117 °F). The top ten qualifiers started on the super soft compound tyre. When the five red lights extinguished to signal the start of the race, Vettel maintained his pole position advantage heading into the second corner. Hamilton accelerated faster than Webber off the line, overtaking him heading into the second turn. Vettel fended off a challenge from Hamilton who made contact with Vettel's right wheel in the second corner and Hamilton reported a vibration in his left-front tyre. The contact damaged Hamilton's front wing. Webber made contact with Button and dropped to ninth by the end of the first lap. Petrov lost the most places, falling from tenth to 16th by the conclusion of the lap. This was due to a large amount of wheelspin delaying Petrov when he drove away from his starting position. At the end of the first lap, Vettel led from Hamilton, Alonso, Massa, Kubica, Button, Barrichello, Hülkenberg, Webber and Buemi.

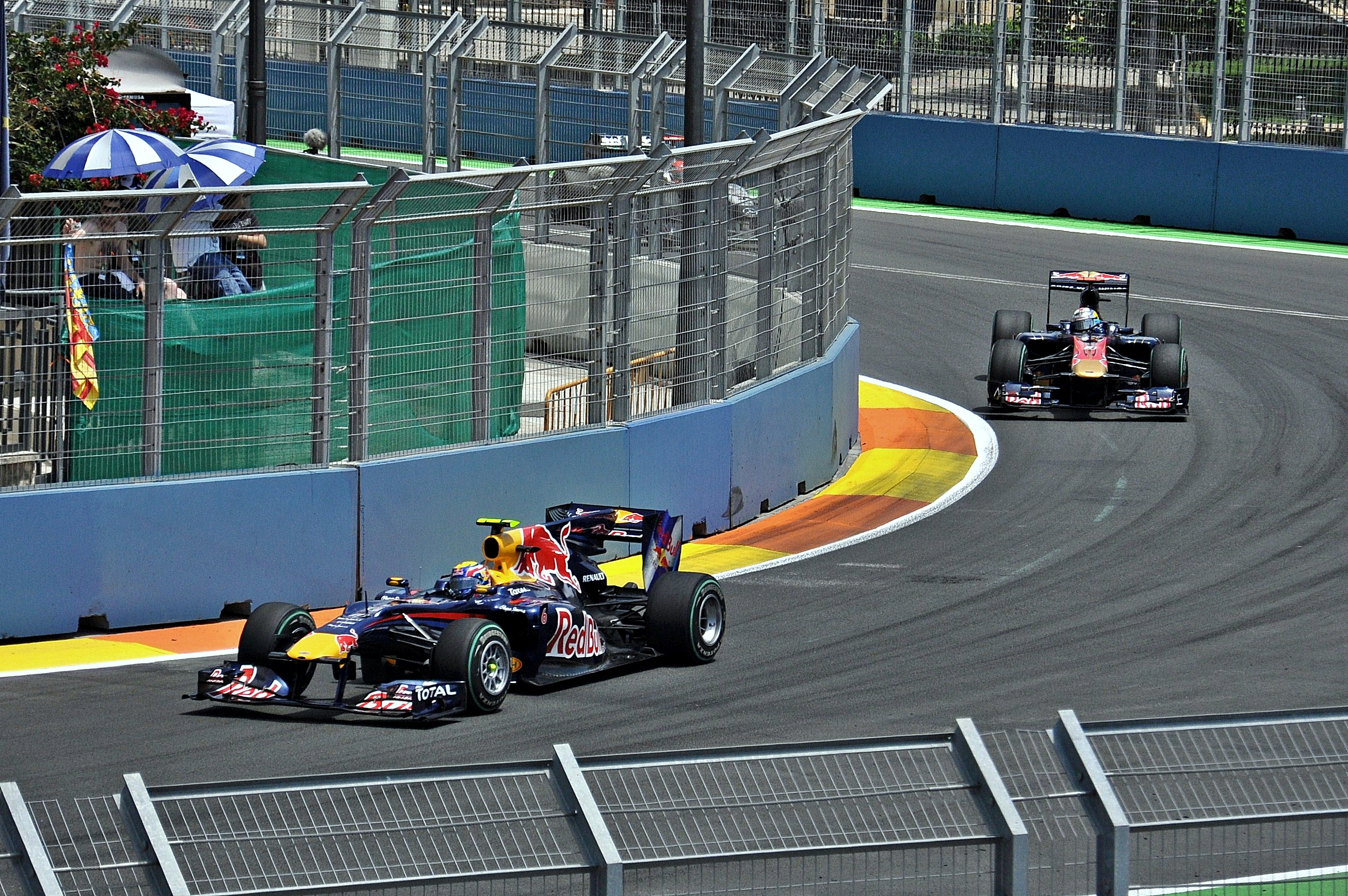
Mark Webber (left) was involved in a large accident with Heikki Kovalainen on the race's ninth lap.

Vettel began to pull away from the rest of the field. Trulli made a pit stop for a replacement nose cone at the start of the second lap after another car made contact with the rear end of his car and his front wing was removed. Webber battled Hülkenberg for eighth position but was unable to overtake the latter. Trulli made a second pit stop on the fifth lap to allow his mechanics to rectify a problem with his car's gearbox and turned off his engine to allow for repairs to occur. Vettel set a fastest lap of the race on lap five, a 1:43.055, and was three seconds ahead of Hamilton, who in turn was being caught by Alonso. It was reported by Red Bull on the following lap that eighth-placed Webber had no mechanical issues. Webber made an early pit stop on lap seven for the medium compound tyres but his crew had a minor problem fitting his left-front wheel which meant he was stationary for 7.9 seconds, and rejoined in 18th position. Rosberg made a similar stop on the next lap but he overshot his pit stall and rejoined in 19th place.

On lap nine, Webber attempted to pass Kovalainen for 17th, by running in his slipstream at 190 mph (310 km/h) on the main straight but the latter appeared to brake earlier than Webber expected, and the Red Bull made contact with Kovalainen's right-rear wheel, sending him airborne. He struck an advertising hoarding and somersaulted. Webber's car landed on its nose, careered into the turn 12 run-off area at high speed and collided with a tyre barrier. Webber was unhurt. The large force of the accident broke his brake pedal. The incident prompted the deployment of the safety car, to allow marshals to clear debris from the area and extricate Webber's car from the run-off area. Kubica, Button, Barrichello, Hülkenberg, Buemi, Sutil, Liuzzi, De la Rosa and Chandhok elected to make pit stops during the safety car period. The safety car was sent onto the circuit as the leaders completed the ninth lap but did not emerge in front of Vettel. Hamilton had the opportunity to overtake the safety car but initially hesitated prior to committing to going by and the delay meant that the safety car had just crossed the official pit-exit line.

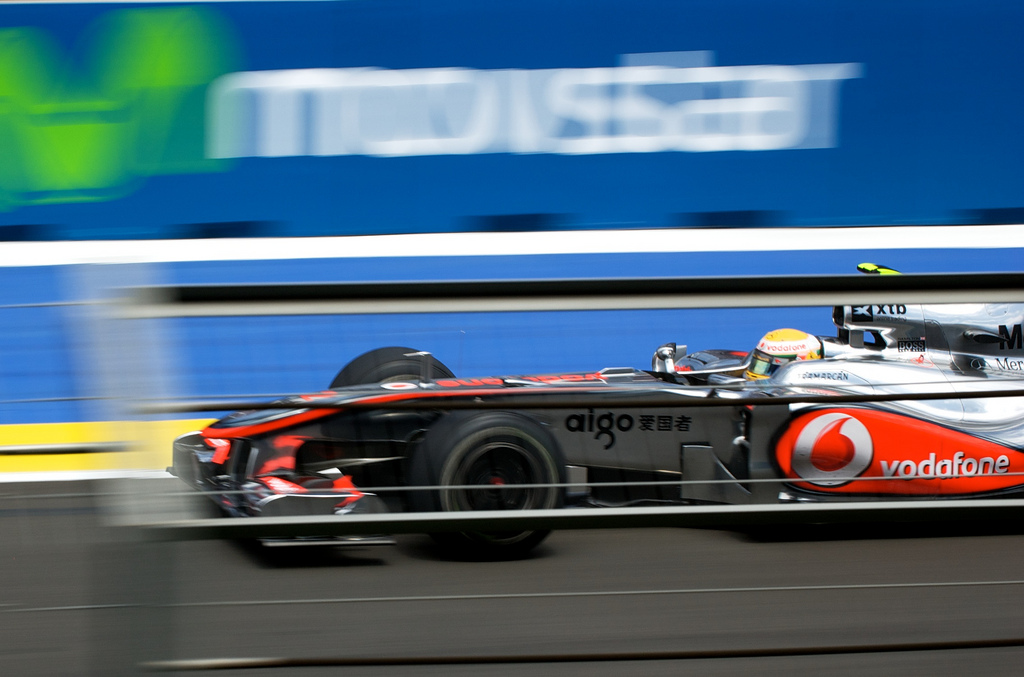
Lewis Hamilton finished the race in second place after some controversy surrounding his illegal pass on the safety car and the penalty which he incurred for it.

The two Ferrari cars and the Renault of Kubica were the first to queue up behind the safety car, while the rest of the field had enough notice to divert to the pitlane for their first stop. The significance of these events was that both Vettel and Hamilton were able to make their first stops before their advantage over the rest of the field was nullified by catching the safety car, while Alonso, Massa and Kubica fell down the order. Hamilton's stop was for a replacement front wing. The safety car drove into the pit lane at the end of lap 14 and the cars were allowed to overtake. Vettel locked his tyres and ran deep driving into the final turn, and resisted Hamilton's attempt to overtake him. Alonso immediately pushed hard and passed Hülkenberg for ninth place at turn 17 on the 15th lap. A line of cars formed behind Kobayashi while Vettel and Hamilton pulled away from the rest of the field, as the front two began trading the fastest lap time of the event. Button gained a large amount of top speed but remained behind both Sauber cars. Schumacher passed both Virgin cars to move into 17th position by lap 17.

Alonso made a complaint about Hamilton and asked his team to work with the Fédération Internationale de l'Automobile race director Charlie Whiting to discuss the issue with the safety car. Massa attempted to pass Liuzzi around the outside heading into turn 17 but Liuzzi turned right to defend the position. Shortly afterwards, Massa made a slight mistake which allowed Alguersuari to close the gap. Hamilton started to conserve fuel and prepare for a late attack on lap 20. On the following lap, it was announced Hamilton would be investigated by the stewards for his safety car overtake for which he was given a drive-through penalty which he served on the 27th lap. He remained in second position due to Kobayashi holding up the rest of the field. Massa placed further pressure upon Liuzzi but was unable to pass him. A glass bottle appeared on the outside of the track on lap 28 which was retrieved by a marshal three laps later to allow racing to continue unaffected. Massa made an error at the final turn on lap 35 which meant he fell behind Liuzzi in the battle for 14th place.

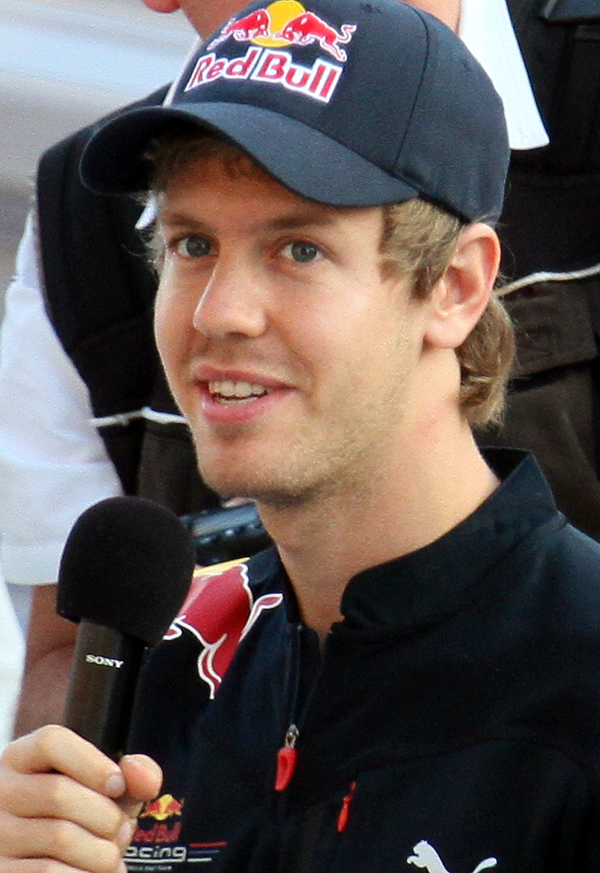
Sebastian Vettel won his second race of the 2010 season.

Vettel extended his lead to 13 seconds when Hamilton lost time due to struggling to pass the lapped cars of Senna and Glock. Glock attempted to pass Senna around the outside heading into the first corner but was unable to move ahead. On lap 37, Glock again attempted to overtake Senna but the two cars collided. The incident caused a puncture on Glock's car that very nearly threw him into a wall and forced him to make a pit stop, though his crew were not ready for him and he lost several seconds as the tyres were brought out. Senna remained on the circuit with a damaged front wing, and made a pit stop on the next lap. Sutil overtook Buemi for seventh place on lap 40. Hamilton was eight tenths of a second quicker than Vettel on the same lap and reduced the gap to 11.9 seconds. Hülkenberg's car emitted blue smoke from the rear on the next lap but disappeared on the 42nd lap. It was announced two laps later that Button, Barrichello, Hülkenberg, Kubica, Petrov, Liuzzi, Sutil, Buemi and De la Rosa were under investigation for exceeding the speed limit during the safety car period.

Hamilton set a new fastest lap of the race on lap 47 to reduce the time deficit to Vettel to 7.9 seconds. Petrov began to challenge De la Rosa for 12th place on the same lap. Hülkenberg's right rear tyre delaminated on lap 50, causing damage to his car's exhaust system and became the race's final retirement. Kobayashi made his only pit stop of the event on lap 53 and rejoined in ninth position behind Alonso. Button was worried about a possible post-race time penalty and pushed hard to record the overall fastest lap of the race, a 1:38.766, on the 54th lap. Alonso challenged Buemi for seventh place on lap 55 but was unable to pass. Kobayashi ran close behind Alonso and passed him around the inside for eighth after Alonso ran wide at turn 17 on the following lap. Buemi was overtaken by Kobayashi at the final corner on the last lap for seventh. Vettel maintained his lead and crossed the start/finish line on lap 57 to win the race, his second of the season and the seventh of his career. Hamilton finished second, with his teammate Button third. Barrichello clinched fourth (his best result of the season), ahead of Kubica, Sutil and Kobayashi. Buemi took eighth on the road, and Alonso and De la Rosa rounded out the top ten. Petrov was the first non-points scoring finisher in 11th, followed by Rosberg, Liuzzi and Massa. Alguersuari clinched 15th, half a second ahead of Schumacher. Di Grassi, Glock, Chandhok, Senna and Trulli were the final classified finishers.

=== Post-race ===
The top three drivers appeared on the podium to collect their trophies and spoke to the media in a later press conference. Vettel said it was good to accumulate a large number of championship points in the championship battle and was "very pleased" with his victory. He said it was not the easiest win he had and he felt satisfied to win on a track where his team did not expect to be dominant. Hamilton stated that he felt it was "very positive" that he remained the Drivers' Championship leader and his team McLaren were still at the top of the Constructors' Championship heading into the British Grand Prix. He hoped that he would be able to close the gap between the two Red Bull cars and challenge them. Button said that the first lap of the race was "fun", and felt that the McLaren and Red Bull teams were strong but did not want to dismiss Ferrari from the championship battle. Overall, he said the event was not the most "exciting" race, but was happy that he and Hamilton were the first two drivers leading the championship.

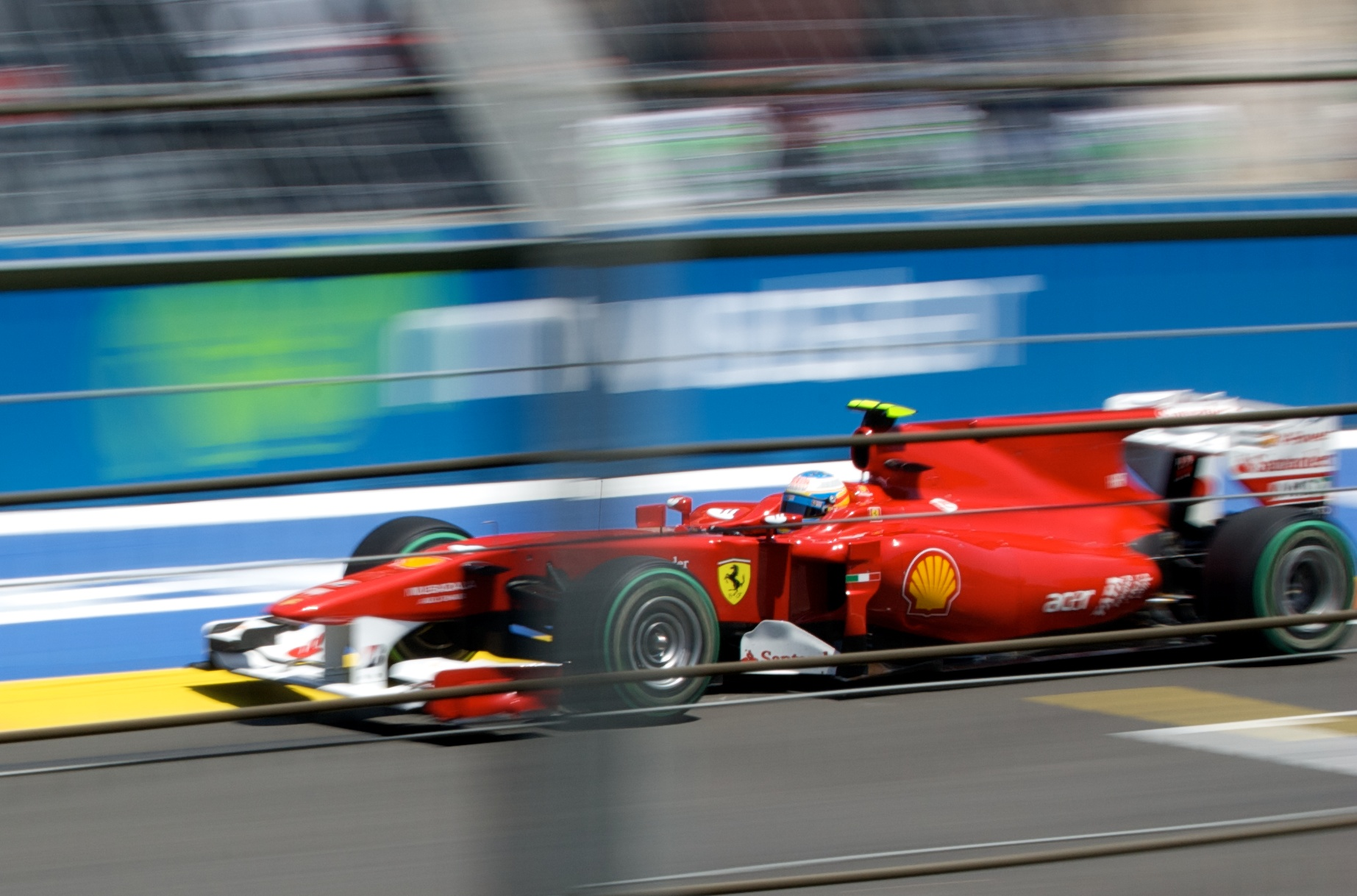
Fernando Alonso claimed the race had been fixed.

Webber said he had minor cuts and bruises after his lap nine accident with Kovalainen. He said he was unsure about Kovalainen's mindset and thought that the driver would allow him to pass. Nevertheless, he did not apportion blame to Kovalainen and said the difference between the braking capabilities of both cars caught him out. Webber later admitted that he misjudged how early Kovalainen would brake for the corner but felt the latter had moved more than once while defending the position. Kovalainen claimed that he had not done anything wrong and blamed Webber for causing the crash. Both drivers were transported to the circuit's medical centre. Commentators likened the crash to the 1999 24 Hours of Le Mans when his Mercedes-Benz CLR became twice airborne down the Mulsanne Straight. BBC pundit and former driver David Coulthard said of the crash: "Motor racing has just seen one of its luckiest days. That could have been a very, very bad incident."

Button, Barrichello, Kubica, Sutil, Buemi, De la Rosa, Petrov, Liuzzi, and Hülkenberg were all issued with five second-time penalties by the stewards for exceeding the safety car-in lap time. The finishing positions of Button, Barrichello, Kubica, Sutil and Liuzzi were unchanged, but the penalty issued to Buemi moved him from eighth to ninth, allowing Alonso to finish eighth. Rosberg inherited tenth position as De la Rosa moved to 12th in the final race classification. Glock was awarded a 20-second time penalty for failing to observe blue flags. Ninth-place finisher Alonso criticised the race stewards, and felt the race had been fixed after they took longer than expected to issue Hamilton's penalty. Piero Ferrari, the vice-president of Ferrari, stated that he was "incredulous and bitter, not just for Ferrari, but for the sport as a whole, as this is not the sort of thing one expects from professionals." Other teams – including Red Bull, Lotus and McLaren – rejected Alonso's accusations, with Lotus' technical director Mike Gascoyne stating "changing the safety car regulations had opened up a set of scenarios that had never been anticipated before. Hamilton passing the safety car is the only recorded example of a driver doing so in the modern era of Formula One." Ferrari subsequently argued for a change of safety car rules to prevent a similar situation reoccurring.

The result extended Hamilton's lead in the World Drivers' Championship over Button to six championship points. Vettel's victory elevated him from fifth to third, 12 championship points behind Hamilton. Webber's retirement dropped him to fourth, while Alonso's eighth-place finish demoted him from fourth to fifth. McLaren increased their advantage over Red Bull in the World Constructors' Championship to 30 championship points ahead. Ferrari remained in third place, while Renault reduced the championship points deficit to Mercedes in the battle for fourth place.

=== Race classification ===
Drivers who scored championship points are denoted in bold.

Pos	No	Driver	Constructor	Laps	Time/Retired	Grid	Points
1	5	**(Germany) Sebastian Vettel**	**Red Bull-Renault**	57	1:40:29.571	1	25
2	2	**(United Kingdom) Lewis Hamilton**	**McLaren-Mercedes**	57	+5.042	3	18
3	1	**(United Kingdom) Jenson Button**	**McLaren-Mercedes**	57	+12.658^{1}	7	15
4	9	**(Brazil) Rubens Barrichello**	**Williams-Cosworth**	57	+25.627^{1}	9	12
5	11	**(Poland) Robert Kubica**	**Renault**	57	+27.122^{1}	6	10
6	14	**(Germany) Adrian Sutil**	**Force India-Mercedes**	57	+30.168^{1}	13	8
7	23	**(Japan) Kamui Kobayashi**	**BMW Sauber-Ferrari**	57	+30.965	18	6
8	8	**(Spain) Fernando Alonso**	**Ferrari**	57	+32.809	4	4
9	16	**(Switzerland) Sébastien Buemi**	**Toro Rosso-Ferrari**	57	+36.299^{1}	11	2
10	4	**(Germany) Nico Rosberg**	**Mercedes**	57	+44.382	12	1
11	7	(Brazil) Felipe Massa	Ferrari	57	+46.621	5	
12	22	(Spain) Pedro de la Rosa	BMW Sauber-Ferrari	57	+47.414^{1}	16	
13	17	(Spain) Jaime Alguersuari	Toro Rosso-Ferrari	57	+48.239	17	
14	12	(Russia) Vitaly Petrov	Renault	57	+48.287^{1}	10	
15	3	(Germany) Michael Schumacher	Mercedes	57	+48.826	15	
16	15	(Italy) Vitantonio Liuzzi	Force India-Mercedes	57	+50.890^{1}	14	
17	25	(Brazil) Lucas di Grassi	Virgin-Cosworth	56	+1 Lap	21	
18	20	(India) Karun Chandhok	HRT-Cosworth	55	+2 Laps	23	
19	24	(Germany) Timo Glock	Virgin-Cosworth	55	+2 Laps^{2}	22	
20	21	(Brazil) Bruno Senna	HRT-Cosworth	55	+2 Laps	24	
21	18	(Italy) Jarno Trulli	Lotus-Cosworth	53	+4 Laps	19	
Ret	10	(Germany) Nico Hülkenberg	Williams-Cosworth	49	Exhaust	8	
Ret	19	(Finland) Heikki Kovalainen	Lotus-Cosworth	8	Collision Damage	20	
Ret	6	(Australia) Mark Webber	Red Bull-Renault	8	Collision	2	

Notes:

1. – Button, Barrichello, Kubica, Sutil, Buemi, De la Rosa, Petrov and Liuzzi were given five-second time penalties for exceeding the safety car-in lap time. Hülkenberg was also given a five-second penalty, but he retired from the race.
2. – Glock was given a 20-second time penalty for failing to observe blue flags.

== Championship standings after the race ==
Drivers' Championship standings

	Pos.	Driver	Points
	1	(United Kingdom) Lewis Hamilton	127
	2	(United Kingdom) Jenson Button	121
2	3	(Germany) Sebastian Vettel	115
1	4	(Australia) Mark Webber	103
1	5	(Spain) Fernando Alonso	98

Constructors' Championship standings

Pos.	Constructor	Points
1	(United Kingdom) McLaren-Mercedes	248
2	(Austria) Red Bull-Renault	218
3	(Italy) Ferrari	165
4	(Germany) Mercedes	109
5	(France) Renault	89
Sources:

- Note: Only the top five positions are included for both sets of standings.

== See also ==
- 2010 Valencia GP2 Series round
- 2010 Valencia GP3 Series round

Previous race: 2010 Canadian Grand Prix	FIA Formula One World Championship; 2010 season	Next race: 2010 British Grand Prix
Previous race: 2009 European Grand Prix	European Grand Prix	Next race: 2011 European Grand Prix
