= McLaren MP4-25 =

2010 Formula One racing car

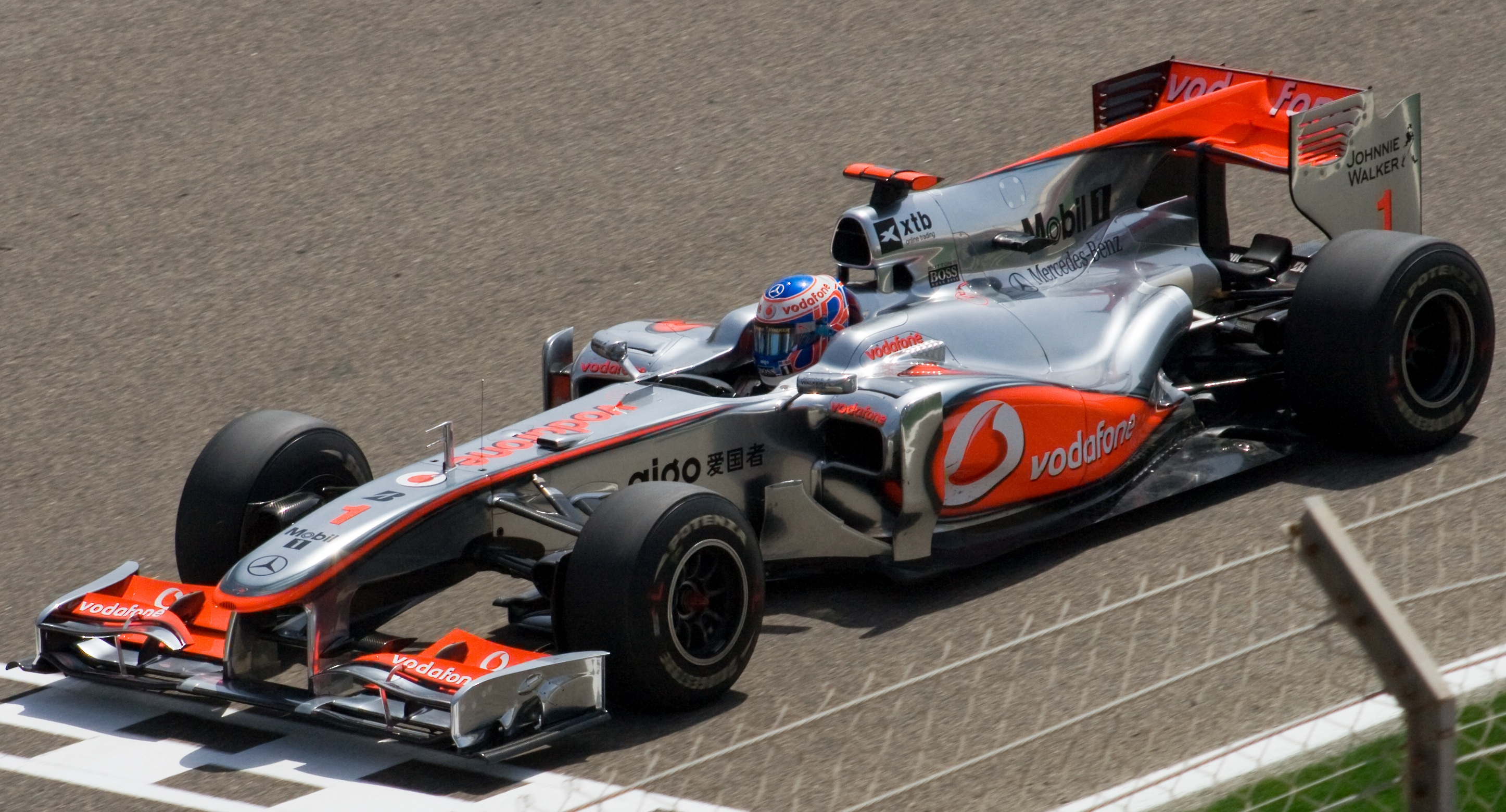
- Jenson Button driving the MP4-25 at the Bahrain Grand Prix
- Category: Formula One
- Constructor: McLaren Racing
- Designers: Neil Oatley (Executive Engineer); Paddy Lowe (Engineering Director); Tim Goss (Chief Engineer); Mark Williams (Head of Vehicle Engineering); Andrew Bailey (Head of Vehicle Design); Luca Furbatto (Project Leader); John Iley (Head of Aerodynamics); Doug McKiernan (Chief Aerodynamicist); David Sanchez (Concept Lead, F-Duct)
- Predecessor: McLaren MP4-24
- Successor: McLaren MP4-26

Technical specifications
- Chassis: Moulded carbon fibre honeycomb composite incorporating front and side impact structures and integral safety fuel cell
- Suspension (front): Inboard torsion bar / damper system operated by pushrod and bell crank with a double wishbone arrangement
- Suspension (rear): as front
- Engine: Mercedes-Benz FO 108X 2.4 L (146 cu in) V8 (90°). Naturally aspirated, 18,000 RPM limited, mid-mounted.
- Transmission: McLaren 7-speed + 1 reverse sequential seamless semi-automatic paddle shift with epicyclic differential and multi-plate limited slip clutch
- Weight: 620 kg (1,367 lb) (including driver)
- Fuel: ExxonMobil High Performance Unleaded (5.75% bio fuel); Mobil Synergy Fuel System; Mobil 1 lubrication
- Tyres: Bridgestone Potenza; Enkei Wheels (front and rear): 13"

Competition history
- Notable entrants: Vodafone McLaren Mercedes
- Notable drivers: 1. (United Kingdom) Jenson Button; 2. (United Kingdom) Lewis Hamilton
- Debut: 2010 Bahrain Grand Prix
- First win: 2010 Australian Grand Prix
- Last win: 2010 Belgian Grand Prix
- Last event: 2010 Abu Dhabi Grand Prix
Races	Wins	Podiums	Poles	F/Laps
19	5	16	1	6

The McLaren MP4-25 is a Formula One racing car designed and raced by McLaren in the 2010 season. The chassis was designed by Paddy Lowe, Neil Oatley, Tim Goss, Andrew Bailey and John Iley and was powered by a customer Mercedes-Benz engine. The car, which was driven by 2009 World Champion Jenson Button and 2008 World Champion Lewis Hamilton, was officially unveiled at title sponsor Vodafone's headquarters in Newbury, Berkshire, UK on 29 January 2010. The MP4-25 was the first McLaren car to be independently built by McLaren alone, becoming a Mercedes customer team after the works team rejoined the series as a full-constructor team by purchasing a 75% stake of Brawn GP.

As of 2024, the McLaren MP4-25 was the last-ever Formula One car to utilize number No. 1 and No. 2 slots under the 1996–2013 Formula One car numbering systems despite its constructor not being the previous season's world constructor's champion.

== F-duct ==
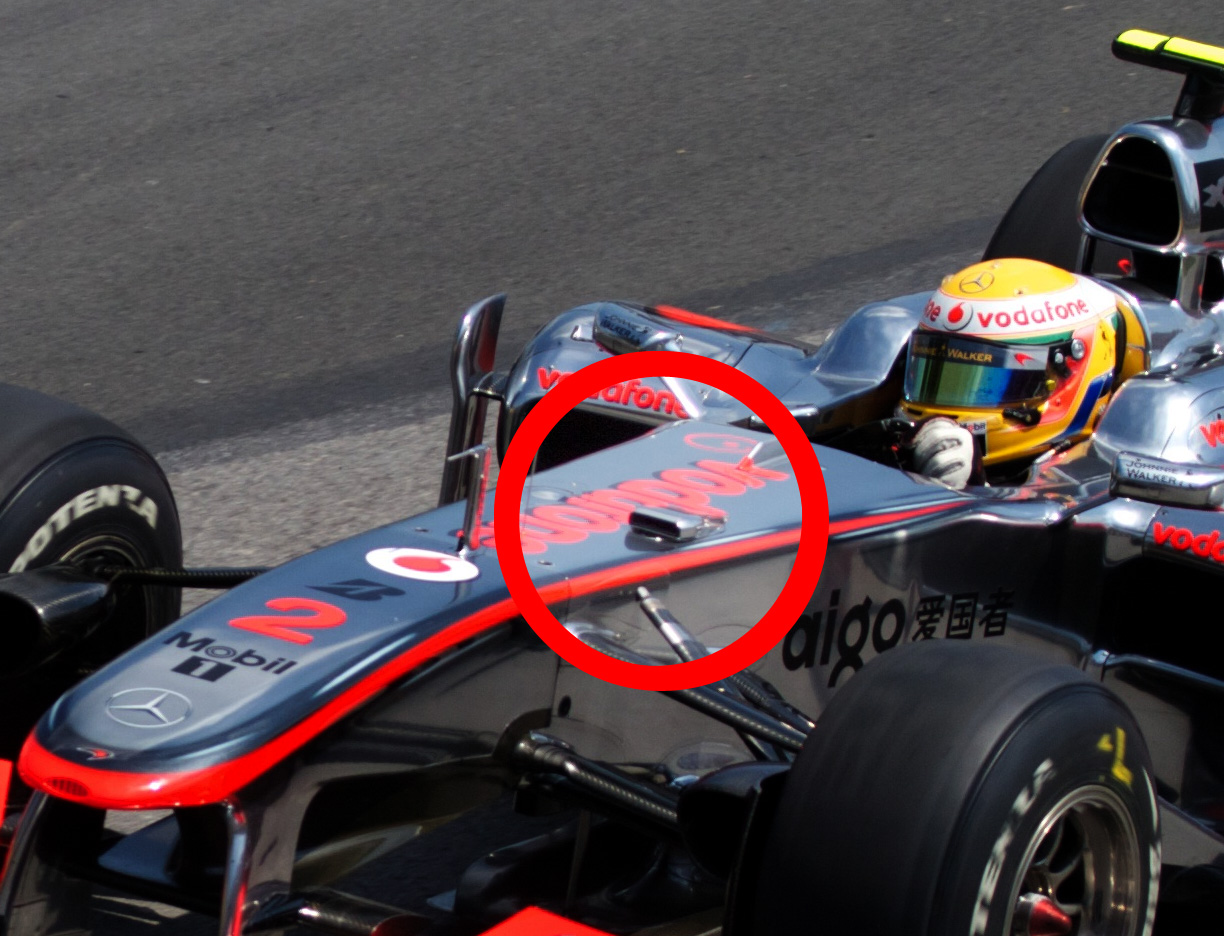
The F-duct can be seen on the top of the chassis between the front wheels.

The Red Bull Racing team complained to the FIA about the legality of the MP4-25's rear wing. The design used a small "snorkel" air scoop mounted in front of the driver that channels air through a duct in the cockpit and towards the rear of the car. Changes in the pressure in the duct, in combination with small slots on the rear wing, caused the wing to enter a stalled state at high speed, reducing aerodynamic drag and allowing the car as much as an extra 6 mph (9.7 km/h) on straights. The effect was controlled by the driver covering up a small hole in the cockpit with his left leg; this was not considered by the FIA to be a moveable aerodynamic device, which would be banned under the technical regulations. Known internally as the RW80 it was widely called the "F-Duct" system because of the location of the 'F' in the sponsor's name directly on the snorkel. The system exploited a "Fluidic Switch", wherein a low flow-rate air stream from the cockpit was used to switch a much higher volume flow rate drawn from the roll hoop. Another term for the system is switchable rear wing (SRW). The car was inspected on the Thursday prior to the Bahrain Grand Prix and cleared to take part in the race.

== Racing history ==
=== Opening rounds ===
The MP4-25 proved to be a stark improvement over the McLaren MP4-24 with both Jenson Button and Lewis Hamilton reaching the third stage of qualifying at the Bahrain Grand Prix. Hamilton got the better of the car in Q3 placing the car fourth on the grid with Button managing eighth. During the race the car proved lacking in downforce causing it to struggle to keep up with the pace of the Ferraris and Sebastian Vettel who opened up an impressive lead. During an uneventful race Hamilton finished third thanks to a problem with Vettel's car, Button also picked up a place during the race and finished seventh.

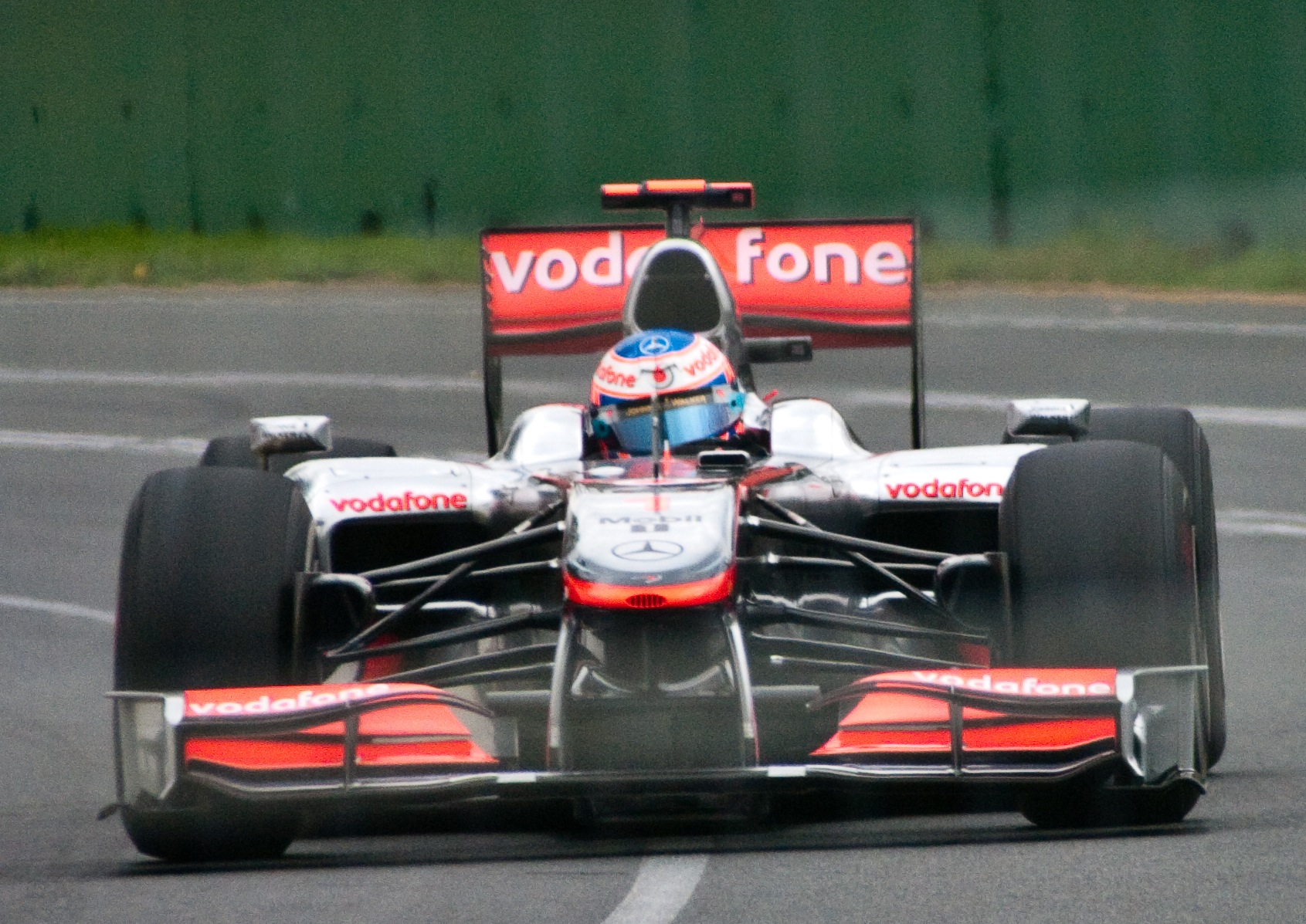
Button won the Australian Grand Prix, in the MP4-25's second race.

In Australia, Button was the first to come in for slick tyres on a damp but drying track, which lifted him to second place after the other drivers had pitted. He inherited the lead when Sebastian Vettel retired with brake problems and maintained the position to the end of the race without changing his tyres again. Hamilton finished sixth after a controversial weekend both on and off the track.

In Malaysia, McLaren seemed to improve their overall pace by three-tenths of a second due to performance updates to the car, with Hamilton recording the fastest lap time in both free practice sessions on Friday. Button also finished in the top ten in all three practice sessions. The first qualifying session was wet and the team relied on the weather radar rather than using common sense to misjudge the weather conditions, failing to send their cars out at the optimum track conditions. Hamilton failed to make it out of the first part of qualifying, setting the 20th best time. Button just made it out of that session, but due to him aquaplaning into the gravel trap, he started seventeenth on the grid taking no further part in the qualifying session. Both drivers finished in the points, with Hamilton finishing sixth and Button eighth.

In China they scored a dominant 1–2 finish. In Spain, Hamilton had been running towards the front for the majority of the race, but crashed out on the penultimate lap when a front wheel rim cracked and deflated a front tyre. Meanwhile, after qualifying fifth, Button experienced delays during his first pitstop, and got jumped by Michael Schumacher for which he was never able to recover, and finished in fifth place.

=== Mid-season rounds ===
In Monaco, the car lacked mechanical grip, with Hamilton and Button qualifying fifth and eighth respectively. Button retired on lap 3 with an overheating engine after a cooling duct was mistakenly left in the radiator, while Hamilton never managed to threaten the pace of the leaders and finished fifth after Schumacher was penalized.

In Turkey, Hamilton and Button qualified second and fourth respectively amongst the two Red Bulls of polesitter Mark Webber and Sebastian Vettel. In the race, the car's straightline speed was evident when Hamilton challenged Webber for first place during the first stint, but was never able to pass. After being delayed during his pitstop when a rear wheel jammed, he dropped behind Vettel, and was keeping up with the pace with Button trailing behind him, whom after passing Michael Schumacher on the first lap was quietly matching the pace of the leaders. However, on lap 41, the two Red Bulls collided with Vettel retiring and Webber needing to pit for a new front wing. Despite a brief battle for the lead with Button as the race drew slowly to a close, Hamilton was never challenged, and led Button home for McLaren's second one-two finish of the season.

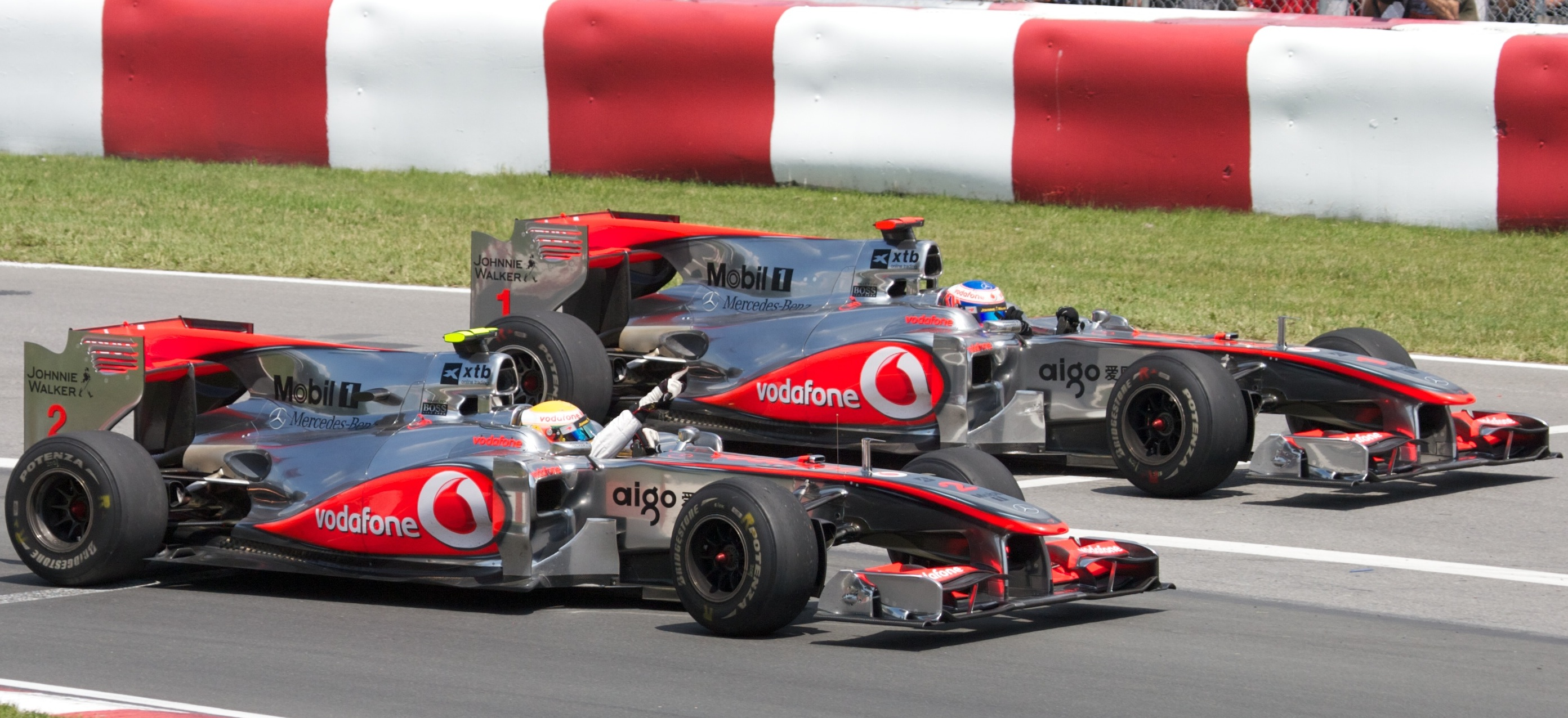
McLaren achieved their third 1–2 of the season in Canada with Hamilton finishing first and Button in second.

In Canada, Hamilton claimed the first non-Red Bull pole of the season, and went on to claim the Drivers' Championship lead as led home Button once again for a 1–2, giving the team the Constructors' Championship lead. In Valencia, Hamilton qualified third behind the Red Bulls, with Button in seventh. In the race, Hamilton passed the safety car illegally – deployed after Webber ran into the back and over Heikki Kovalainen's Lotus – and was forced to serve a drive-through penalty. Despite this, Hamilton finished second behind Vettel with Button completing the podium.

McLaren hoped to challenge Red Bull at Silverstone, introducing new aerodynamic updates for the car. Unfortunately for the team, neither driver could find a good balance and setup for the new updates and reverted to the original package. Hamilton qualified fourth while Button failed to make the top ten, ending up 14th. Hamilton took another second place in the race while Button finished fourth, losing out on the final podium spot to Nico Rosberg. Hockenheim proved difficult for McLaren with the team preparing a damage limitation tactics until further major updates were introduced. Hamilton retained his championship lead with fourth, with Button just behind to keep McLaren top of the Constructors' Championship.

In Hungary, the circuit's nature hindered McLaren more with Button missing the top ten again and Hamilton nearly two seconds off pole position. Hamilton retired during the race with a gearbox issue, and Button finished a lap down in eighth place. The results of the weekend meant that both championship leads were lost, Hamilton falling four points behind Webber and the team falling eight points behind Red Bull.

=== Post-summer break rounds ===
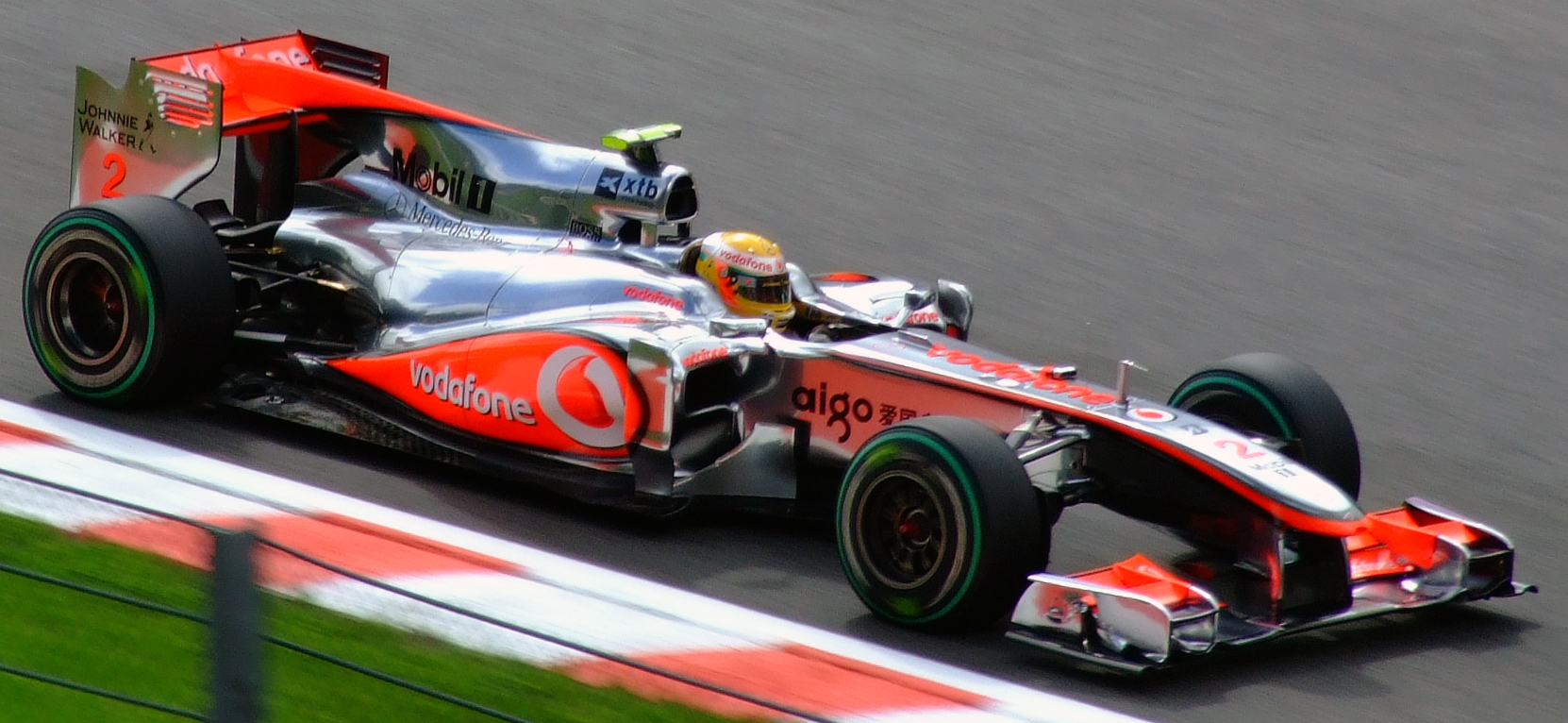
Hamilton took home what turned out to be McLaren's last win of the season at the Belgian Grand Prix.

The Belgian Grand Prix looked set to be more successful, with Hamilton second on the grid and Button fifth. As the rain came down, they quickly moved into first and second. However, Sebastian Vettel was very close to Button in second and on lap 16, as the German tried to overtake on the outside of the Bus Stop chicane, he lost control and hit Button's McLaren, eliminating the Briton from the race. Hamilton stayed in the lead until the very end, however, despite a scare as the rain returned in the closing laps.

Button qualified second for the Italian Grand Prix, with Hamilton in 5th, a reversal of their positions from Spa. Button took the lead from Alonso at turn one, as he needed to on his contrary strategy. Hamilton, meanwhile, attempted to pull the same trick on Alonso's teammate Massa at the second chicane, but instead hit the Brazilian, damaging his front suspension and eliminating him from the race. Button stayed ahead until the pit stops, but Alonso emerged comfortably ahead to take victory. Button was still close at the end, just under 3 seconds behind.

Hamilton and Button were third and fourth on the grid in Singapore, with just 5 tenths separating the top 5. The two McLaren men stayed in position during a safety car, deployed to clear the wreckage of Vitantonio Liuzzi's Force India, right up to the pit stops. They emerged behind Mark Webber, who had jumped them in the stops, just in time for a second safety car as Kamui Kobayashi and Bruno Senna collided. This closed up the field, and on the restart, Webber was held up by Lucas di Grassi in the Virgin, who he was lapping, which allowed Hamilton to close right up. The Brit attempted a move into turn 7, but as he moved across in front of the Australian, the two made contact and Lewis's rear suspension was terminally damaged. For the second time in two races, he had retired due to unnecessary contact with another car. As Webber carried on unscathed, this allowed Button through into fourth, and that was how it stayed until the end of the race.

=== Closing rounds ===
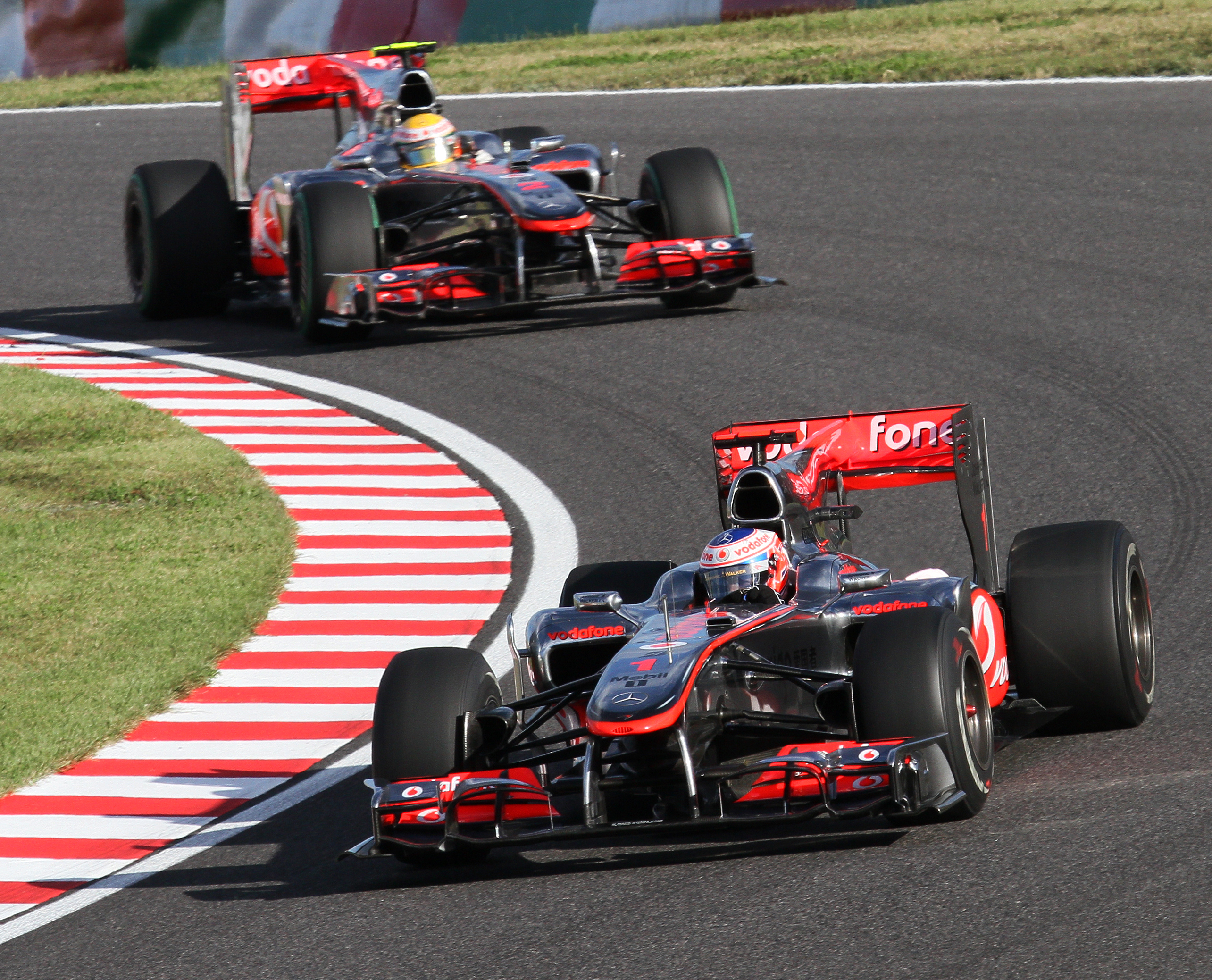
Button leads Hamilton at the Japanese Grand Prix

Qualifying for the Japanese Grand Prix was held on the morning of the race, after torrential rain at Suzuka on the Saturday. Hamilton qualified third, but eventually started the race in 8th after a 5 place grid penalty for changing his gearbox. This meant that Button, originally sixth, started fifth. Hamilton had a brilliant start, moving up 6th just behind his teammate before the safety car was deployed due to the first corner incident involving Nico Hülkenberg, Felipe Massa, Vitaly Petrov and Vitantonio Liuzzi. The retirement of Robert Kubica two laps later promoted them to 4th and 5th. Button led during the pit stops, but emerged in fifth, behind Hamilton. Hamilton was in difficulty with his gearbox, however, and Button quickly caught and re-passed him. This was how they finished, meaning that they were now trailing in 4th and 5th in the championship battle.

Hamilton was fourth on the grid in Korea, with Button down in 7th. The race began in torrential conditions, and was red flagged after three laps under the safety car. A while later, the race began again, still under the safety car, and it remained out until lap 18. On the first racing lap, Hamilton was passed by Nico Rosberg, and shortly afterwards, Webber spun out of the race, collecting Rosberg as he spun back across the track. This meant that Hamilton was in 3rd, and Button 5th. Button fared very badly in the pit stops, and when things leveled out, he was in 15th, with Hamilton still 3rd. 10 laps from the end, Sebastian Vettel, who was leading the race, suffered an engine failure, gifting Alonso the lead and Hamilton second place, and that was how they finished. The retirements of Petrov, Vettel and Adrian Sutil meant that Button climbed to 12th by the end. This meant that Hamilton had re-passed Vettel for 3rd in the championship battle, and McLaren were clinging on to second from the ever improving Ferrari.

Brazil was up next, and in tricky conditions in qualifying, Button was eliminated in Q2 by local hero and fellow top 10 regular Felipe Massa. He started the race from 11th. Meanwhile, Hamilton was upholding the challenge in a decisive weekend for the Woking squad, taking fourth on the grid. Hamilton dropped to 5th at the start, passed by a fast starting Fernando Alonso. Button, meanwhile, had climbed to 9th, but was soon re-passed by a rapidly improving Michael Schumacher. Button, in a reversal of his Korean luck, did very well from his early pit stop, climbing to seventh, well ahead of Schumacher. Hamilton, meanwhile, had eventually forced his way past the surprise pole sitter Hülkenberg on lap 14. Hamilton was stuck behind the long running Kamui Kobayashi after his stop, but both he and Button, who was at this point close behind, found a way through. The late pit stop of Nico Rosberg promoted them to 4th and 5th, which were by now their customary positions, and that was how they finished. The championship was now out of Button's reach going to the final round in Abu Dhabi, and it was an outside shot for Hamilton, who was 24 points off Fernando Alonso's lead.

The season concluded with the Abu Dhabi Grand Prix. Hamilton took 2nd in a critical race for him, with Button in 4th. Button jumped Alonso at the start, which was good for Hamilton, who needed to win with Alonso out of the points and Vettel and Webber both well down. Button led during the pit stops, but when everything was settled down, they were still in the same order, 2nd and 3rd behind Vettel, who went on to take the race and the title. Hamilton was eventually fourth, 16 points off Vettel, while Button was 5th, a further 26 behind. McLaren held on to second in the Constructors', 44 behind Red Bull and 58 ahead of Ferrari in 3rd.

== Sponsorship and livery ==
The livery was the same as in recent years: metallic grey, accented by the red inserts of the sponsor, Vodafone. At the Turkish and Abu Dhabi Grands Prix, the Johnnie Walker logo was replaced by Diageo.

As part of McLaren’s marketing strategy, the team often leveraged local brands and short-term, country-specific sponsorship agreements during a given nation’s Grand Prix to gain regional exposure, with the sponsors' logos appearing on the sides of the car’s cockpit.

- Australia: Maximum Adventure
- Spanish: Andalusia
- European: Tramarcan
- British: Silver Homes
- German: Runners Point
- Hungary: Pick
- Singapore: M1

== Complete Formula One results ==
(key) (results in bold indicate pole position; results in italics indicate fastest lap)

Year	Entrant	Engine	Tyres	Drivers	1	2	3	4	5	6	7	8	9	10	11	12	13	14	15	16	17	18	19	Points	WCC
2010	Vodafone McLaren Mercedes	Mercedes FO 108X V8	**B**		BHR	AUS	MAL	CHN	ESP	MON	TUR	CAN	EUR	GBR	GER	HUN	BEL	ITA	SIN	JPN	KOR	BRA	ABU	**454**	**2nd**
2010	Vodafone McLaren Mercedes	Mercedes FO 108X V8	**B**	Button	7	1	8	1	5	Ret	2	2	3	4	5	8	Ret	2	4	4	12	5	3	**454**	**2nd**
2010	Vodafone McLaren Mercedes	Mercedes FO 108X V8	**B**	Hamilton	3	6	6	2	14^{†}	5	1	**1**	2	2	4	Ret	1	Ret	Ret	5	2	4	2	**454**	**2nd**

^{†} Driver failed to finish the race, but were classified as they had completed >90% of the race distance.

== In video games ==
The MP4-25 was featured in F1 2010 as one of the playable vehicles, it would return as a classic car in F1 2019 and F1 2020. The car also appears in Asphalt 8: Airborne. It was added during the December's 2016 "Championship Update".

Awards
Preceded by F1 in Schools	Autosport; Pioneering and Innovation Award (F-duct); 2010	Succeeded by Senna
