= 2010 Belgian Grand Prix =

Formula One race

Race 13 of 19 in the 2010 Formula One World Championship
← Previous race	Next race →

Race details
- Date: 29 August 2010
- Official name: 2010 Formula 1 Belgian Grand Prix
- Location: Circuit de Spa-Francorchamps, Francorchamps, Wallonia, Belgium
- Course: Permanent racing facility
- Course length: 7.004 km (4.352 miles)
- Distance: 44 laps, 308.052 km (191.415 (Note: There is a 0.124 km (0.077 mi) offset between the start and finish lines.) miles)
- Weather: Intermittent rain
- Attendance: 60,000

Pole position
Driver	(Australia) Mark Webber	Red Bull-Renault
- Time: 1:45.778

Fastest lap
Driver	(United Kingdom) Lewis Hamilton	McLaren-Mercedes
- Time: 1:49.069 on lap 32

Podium
First	(United Kingdom) Lewis Hamilton	McLaren-Mercedes
Second	(Australia) Mark Webber	Red Bull-Renault
Third	(Poland) Robert Kubica	Renault

The 2010 Belgian Grand Prix (officially the 2010 Formula 1 Belgian Grand Prix) was a Formula One motor race held before a crowd of 60,000 spectators at the Circuit de Spa-Francorchamps in Francorchamps, Wallonia, Belgium, on 29 August. It was the 13th round of the 2010 Formula One World Championship and the 55th Belgian Grand Prix held as part of the Formula One World Championship. McLaren's Lewis Hamilton won the 44-lap race after starting from second position. Red Bull's Mark Webber was second ahead of Robert Kubica's third-placed Renault, his final podium in F1. It was Hamilton's third victory of the season and the 14th of his career.

Webber, who led the World Drivers' Championship with a four-point lead over Hamilton and his team Red Bull led the World Constructors' Championship, achieved the sixth pole position of his career by setting the fastest lap in qualifying but started slowly and immediately lost the lead to Hamilton. The Grand Prix was slowed by two safety car deployments due to a collision between the Williams car of Rubens Barrichello and Ferrari's Fernando Alonso on the first lap and another accident for Alonso on the 38th lap. Hamilton led throughout in variable weather, despite running into a gravel trap on lap 35, and finished 1.5 seconds ahead of Webber. Kubica took his last podium by finishing third after overshooting the entry to his pit lane box late in the race.

The result returned Hamilton to the top of the World Drivers' Championship standings with 182 championship points, three ahead of the previous leader Webber in second. Webber's teammate Vettel remained in third despite coming 15th after colliding with Button and sustaining a left-rear puncture from contact with Vitantonio Liuzzi's Force India car. McLaren lowered Red Bull's World Constructors' Championship lead to one championship point with Ferrari third with six races left in the season.

== Background ==
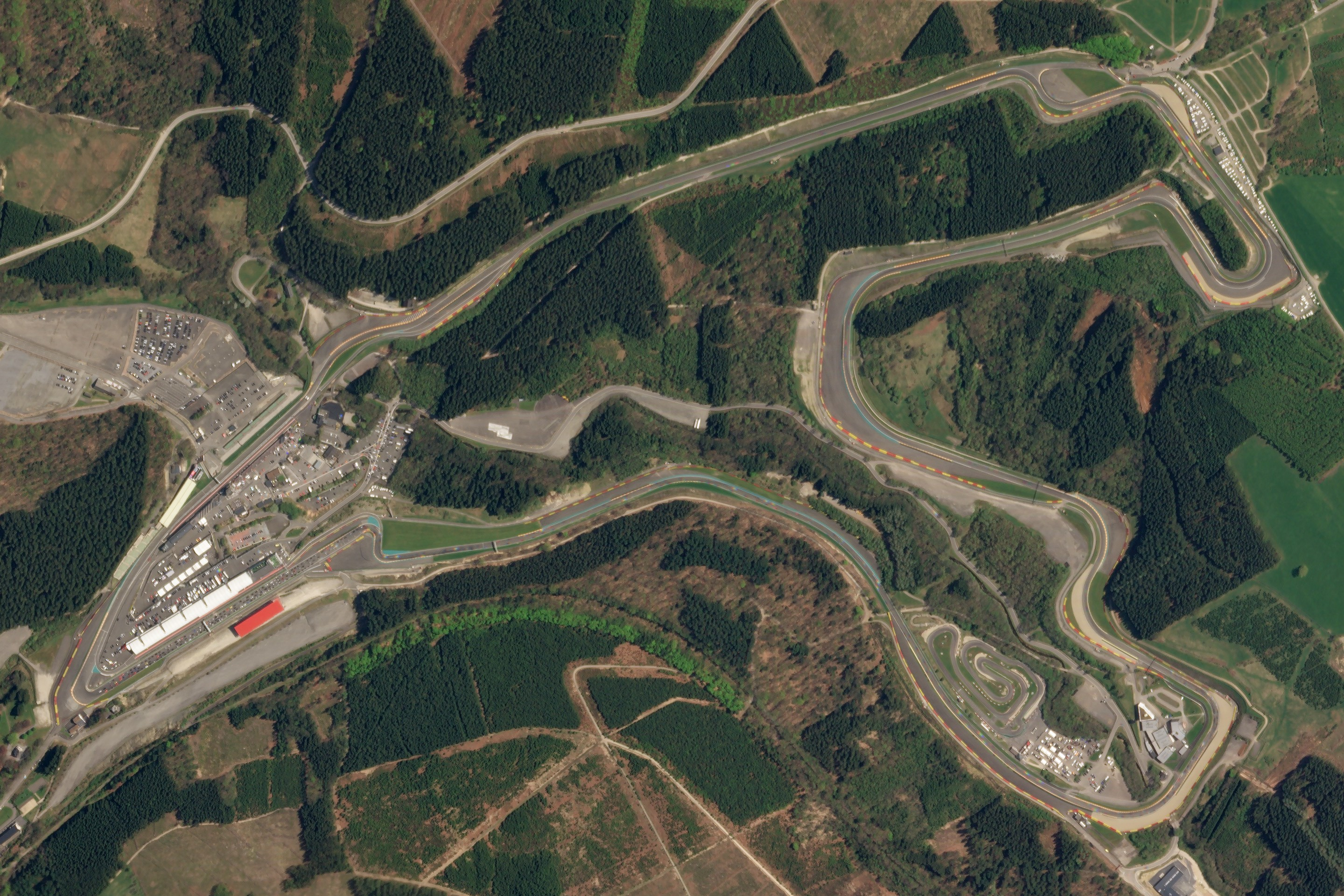
The Circuit de Spa-Francorchamps (pictured in 2018), where the race was held

The 2010 Belgian Grand Prix was the 13th of the 19 events in the 2010 Formula One World Championship, and the 55th World Championship edition of the race. It was held at the 19-turn 7.004 km (4.352 mi) Circuit de Spa-Francorchamps, located in Francorchamps, Wallonia, Belgium, on 29 August. Formula One tyre supplier Bridgestone brought the soft and medium dry compounds and the intermediate and full wet-weather tyres to the race. After the 2009 event, the tarmac run-off area at Les Combes chicane was expanded with three bumps (similar to those on the chicanes at the Autodromo Nazionale di Monza, the Circuit de Catalunya and the Valencia Street Circuit) added to stop drivers sustaining damage to their cars if they ventured off the circuit. La Source turn had a larger area of artificial grass and a 50 mm (2.0 in) kerb installed at the corner to deter competitors from transgressing track limits.

After winning the preceding Hungarian Grand Prix, Red Bull's Mark Webber led the World Drivers' Championship with 161 championship points, ahead of Lewis Hamilton of McLaren with 157 championshippoints and Webber's teammate Sebastian Vettel with 151 championship points. Hamilton's teammate Jenson Button was fourth with 147 championship points and Ferrari's Fernando Alonso was fifth with 141 championship points. With 312 championship points, Red Bull led the World Constructors' Championship followed by McLaren in second with 304 championship points and the third-placed Ferrari with 238 championship points. Mercedes were fourth with 132 championship points and Renault were fifth with 106 championship points.

The race was the first after a four-week gap between races that includes a mandatory two-week shut-down for all teams. Although he had reclaimed the World Drivers' Championship lead from Hamilton in Hungary, Webber said consistently finishing and reliability was an important factor in the final seven races, "You have to be mindful of the fact that you might not get anything out of it so you need to realise that four points is better than none and gambling." His teammate Vettel, the bookmakers' favourite for victory, said his title challenge would commence in Belgium following reliability issues and incidents losing him championship points in past events, "We have to focus on each and every race. With 20 races or 15 races there is probably more room for mistakes – but with seven to go every single races is probably more important." Hamilton said he was confident of better pace for the rest of the season and wanted to win at Spa-Francorchamps. His teammate Button believed the next two races would be consequential for the championship but said they would better suit his McLaren.

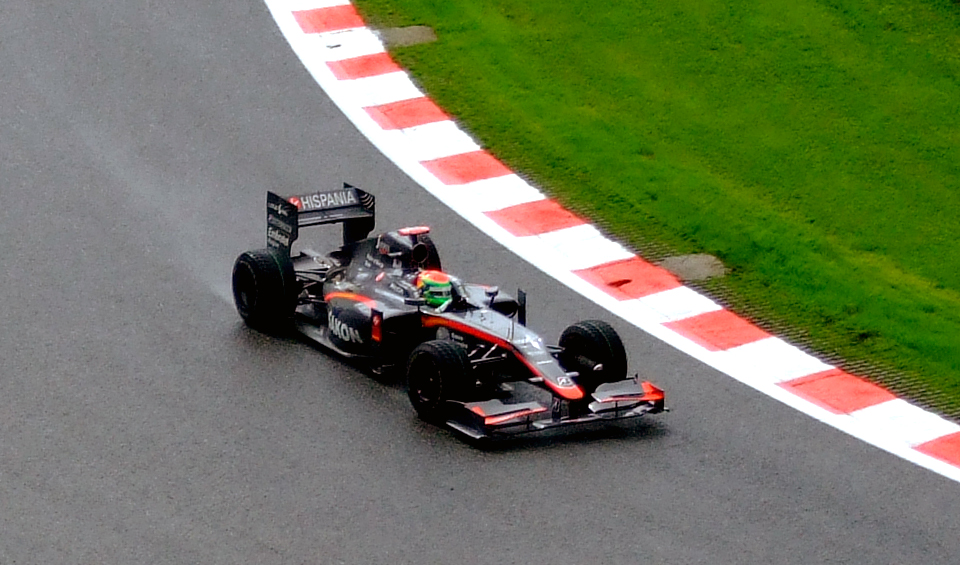
Sakon Yamamoto was retained by the Hispania Racing team for the race.

Some teams modified their cars for better efficiency on the track's straights. Ferrari introduced a new rear wing with less downforce on Felipe Massa's F10 car for qualifying and the race. The team also added a modified diffuser and floor to maximise the F10's performance within FIA compliance restricting the size of the car's lower surface to reduce the downforce generated. Red Bull altered the RB6's brake discs for extra ballast around the car and improved performance and McLaren installed a new front wing on Button's MP4-27 vehicle to improve airflow and downforce. Renault introduced a version of McLaren's F-duct tool to their R30 car activated by the driver's left hand and directed air to the main section of the rear wing instead of the flap. The team was impressed at the F-duct's performance during practice and retained the tool for the rest of the meeting. Williams introduced new front and rear wings for their FW32 cars and Force India added a new floor to their vehicles.

Having driven one of its cars since the British Grand Prix three races earlier, Hispania Racing opted to retain Sakon Yamamoto in lieu of Karun Chandhok, whom the press anticipated would return to drive for the squad following the mid-season interval. Paul di Resta, Force India's reserve and test driver, did not enter the first practice session because the team wanted its race drivers Vitantonio Liuzzi and Adrian Sutil to become acclimatised with a revised aerodynamic bodywork.

== Practice ==
There were three practice sessions held in accordance with the 2010 regulations, two 90-minute sessions on Friday morning and afternoon and one 60-minute session on Saturday morning. Heavy rain fell on the circuit at about midnight before the first session. Although the track was wet, a decent level of grip was reported as some drivers aquaplaned when the rain briefly increased in intensity and lightning came approximately 50 minutes in; the rain abated with 20 minutes left. Alonso lapped fastest at 2:01.223 at mid-point before improving to a 2:00.797 late on. Hamilton, Renault's Robert Kubica, Vettel, Sutil, Button, Webber, Kamui Kobayashi of Sauber, Williams' Rubens Barrichello, and Mercedes' Michael Schumacher made up positions two through ten.

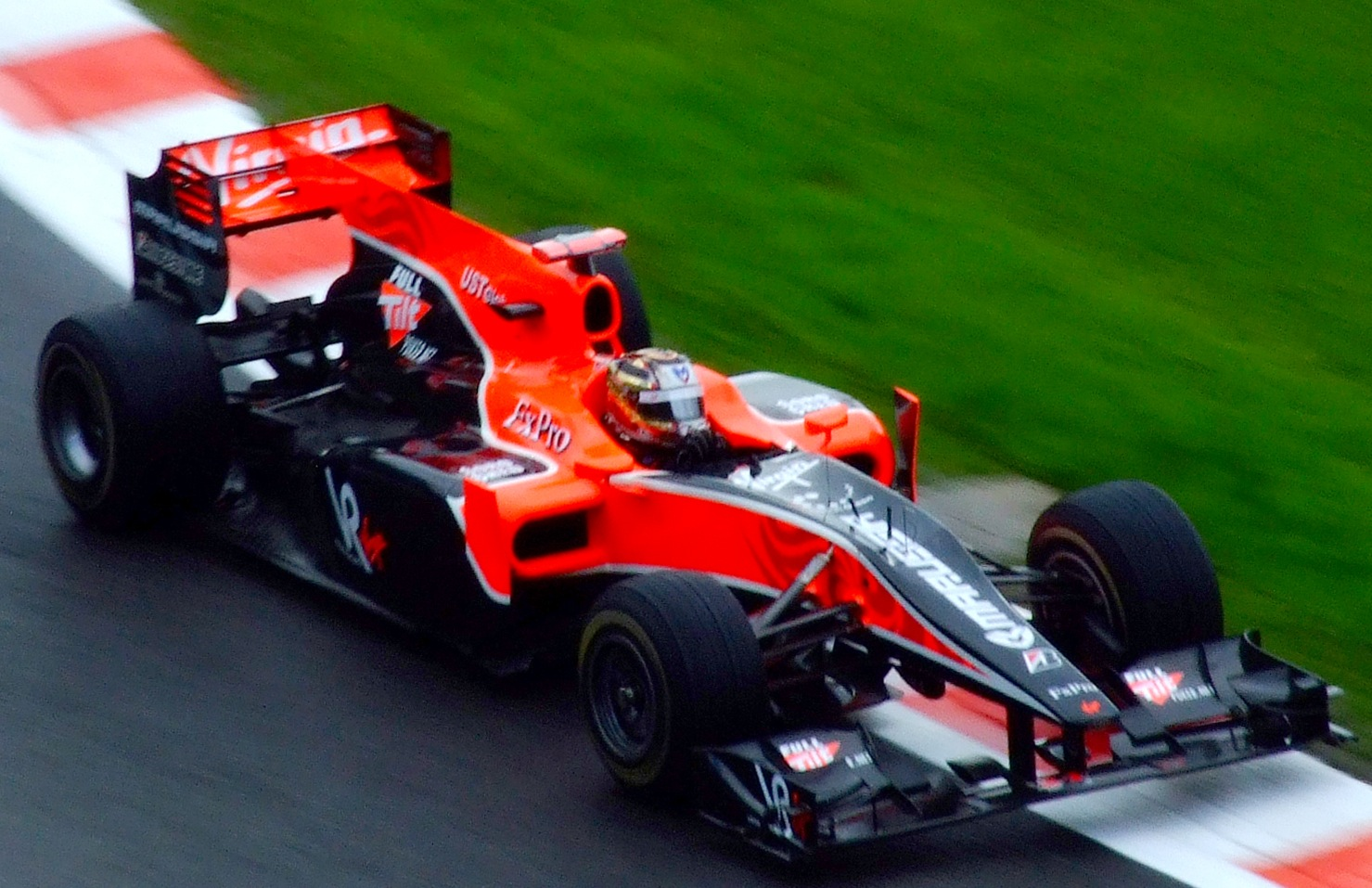
Timo Glock crashed during the second practice session

The second session commenced on a damp circuit which gradually dried up bar a small rain shower early on. Drivers used wet-weather tyres before switching to the dry compounds. Alonso led with the day's fastest lap, a 1:49.032, ahead of Sutil, Hamilton, Kubica, Massa, Vettel, Button, Pedro de la Rosa for Sauber, Barrichello and De la Rosa's teammate Kamui Kobayashi in positions two to ten. Due to the damp conditions, some drivers ventured off the track during the session. Liuzzi lost control under braking for Rivage chicane but was able to return to the pit lane for a new front wing. Virgin's Timo Glock lost control of his car on a white line and crashed sideways into the barrier at Liège corner. The session was stopped for ten minutes by the stewards for a safety hazard limiting dry track running. Children were reportedly climbing the catch fence on track grounds, forcing FIA race director Charlie Whiting to drive the safety car and do an inspection. While the session restarted with four minutes left, a malfunctioning red light delayed on-track action, requiring marshals to wave a green flag to resume proceedings.

More overnight rain showers made the track damp by the start of the final session but slick tyres were used after 20 minutes. Conditions remained dry enough for drivers to go faster until a downpour fell on the circuit with 15 minutes remaining and caught out some participants. With a 1:46.106 lap being almost three seconds quicker than Friday's best time, Webber led from Hamilton, Vettel, Button, Kubica, Alonso, Massa, Sutil, Williams' Nico Hülkenberg and Kobayashi. Vettel stopped his car at the pit lane entry with his car stuck in gear due to an air box fault prompting his team to instruct him to switch off the engine as a precaution. A group of marshals moved Vettel's car into the pit lane for retrieval by his team.

== Qualifying ==
Saturday afternoon's qualifying session was split into three parts. The first session ran for 20 minutes, eliminating cars that finished 18th or lower. The second session was 15 minutes long, eliminating cars that finished 11th to 17th. The final ten-minute session determined pole position to tenth. Cars in the final session were not allowed to change tyres before the start of the race, using the set with which they set their quickest lap times. Qualifying commenced in clear weather before rain showers fell on parts of the circuit, making the surface uneven and catching some drivers out. The rain soon abated and the circuit quickly dried up before light rain fell again at the third session's end.

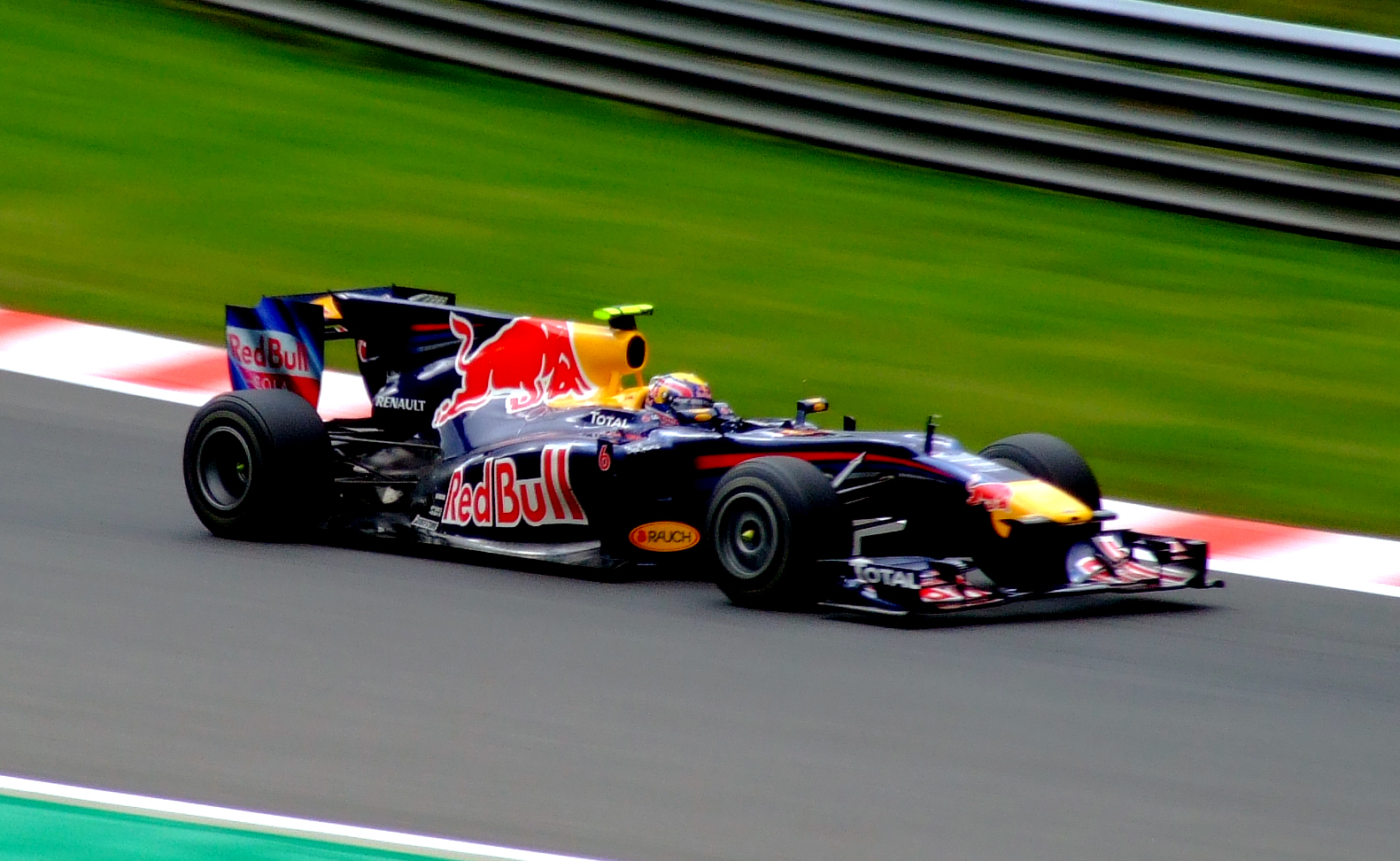
Mark Webber qualified on pole position for the Grand Prix

Webber positioned himself for space and driving on the circuit at its driest, for his first pole position since the Turkish Grand Prix, his fifth of the season and the sixth of his career with a 1:45.778 lap set late in the third session. It was the 12th time in 13 races Red Bull had pole position. Webber was joined on the grid's front row by Hamilton whose first timed lap was on old soft tyres with his second on a new set of tyres before the rain fell. Kubica in third did not set a second timed lap in the final session because a fuel feed fault cut out his car entering the pit lane and requiring mechanics to push his car into the garage for the rest of qualifying. Errors on each of his third session laps left Vettel fourth. Button took fifth by saving a set of soft tyres despite losing time through an error at La Source turn and being circumspect at Fagnes corner. Massa, sixth, altered his rear wing for better straightline speed but had less grip in the turns halfway through the lap. Barrichello qualified seventh for his 300th Grand Prix on the hard compound tyre having depleted his soft tyre allocation in the first two sessions. (Note: Barrichello was actually starting his 297th race; he had failed to begin three previous races he had entered.) Sutil, eighth, had one timed lap on one set of soft compound tyres and Hülkenberg in ninth was on worn soft tyres.

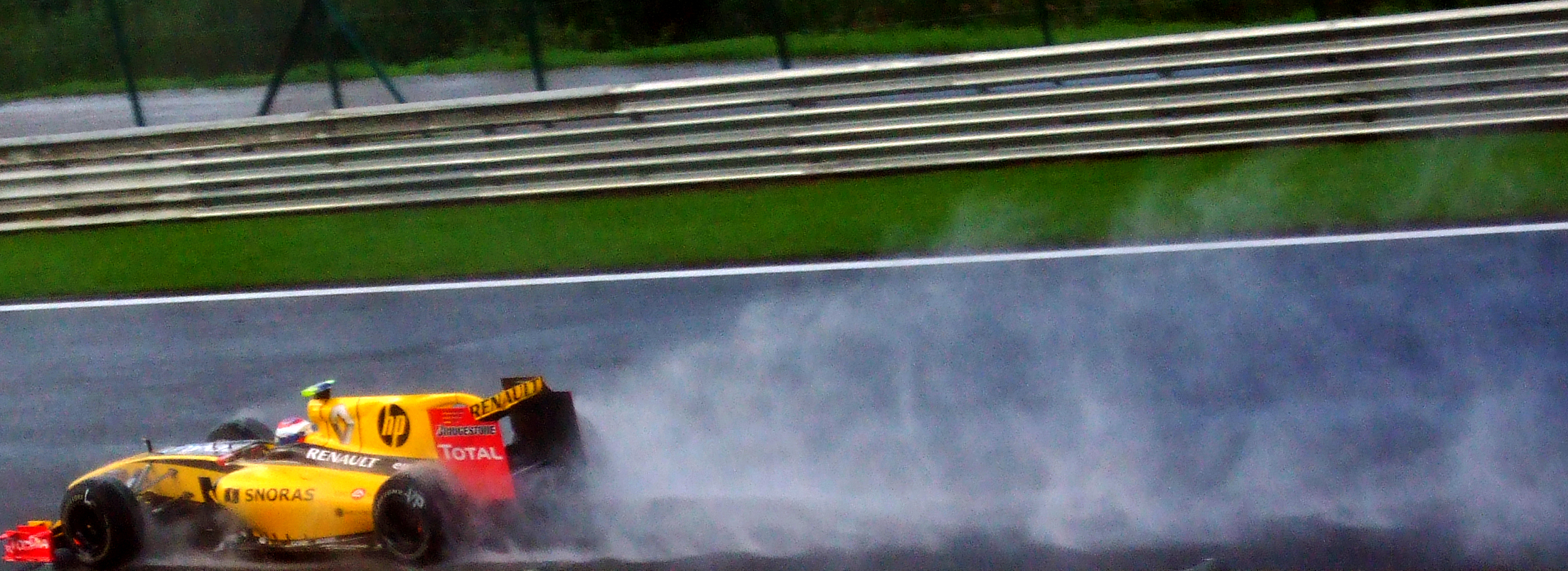
A crash by Vitaly Petrov in the first qualifying session caused a six-minute stoppage.

Alonso, 10th, lost a plethora of time running wide on the damp La Source corner; he used less front wing angle and an old rear wing. Schumacher was the fastest driver not to progress to the final session in 11th. His teammate Rosberg in 12th lacked grip on a wet-weather set-up and had to slow when he came across the Toro Rosso car of Sébastien Buemi. Toro Rosso's Jaime Alguersuari slowed on the slippery turns 13 and 14 on his final timed lap and was 13th ahead of Liuzzi in 14th. Alguersari's teammate Buemi was 15th. Heikki Kovalainen advanced to the second session for the second time in 2010 since the Malaysian Grand Prix and qualified his Lotus 16th. Glock made no errors for 17th. Lotus' Jarno Trulli, 18th, made contact with the right-rear of Lucas di Grassi's out of control Virgin Racing vehicle at Stavelot turn. A tyre strategy error and going wide into the gravel on the wet track left Kobayashi 19th. Hispania Racing driver Bruno Senna was 20th and his teammate Yamamoto 21st following a tyre strategy error and Yamamoto being impeded by a slower car. De la Rosa in 22nd lost control of the rear of his car at Rivage turn and struck the wall. Di Grassi, 23rd, set no lap time after his collision with Trulli. Vitaly Petrov lost control of his Renault on dry tyres on a damp kerb exiting Rivage corner and spun into the inside barrier backwards. The session was stopped for six minutes so that marshals could move his car off the track.

=== Post-qualifying ===
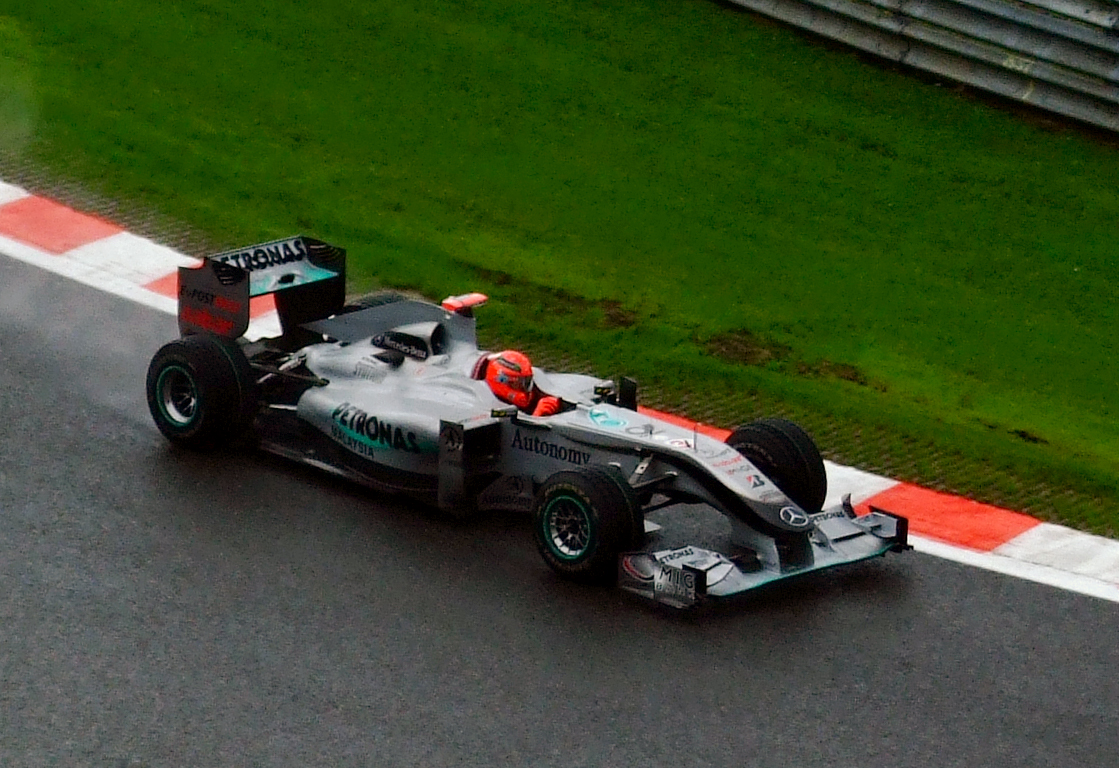
Michael Schumacher took a ten-place grid penalty for dangerous driving at the previous Grand Prix.

A total of five drivers received grid penalties post-qualifying. Schumacher was demoted ten places for forcing Barrichello close to the concrete wall at the Hungarian Grand Prix. His teammate Rosberg lost five places for changing his car's gearbox to one that had not been used unused for four races. Buemi was demoted three positions because he was deemed by the race stewards to have transgressed the sporting regulations by blocking Rosberg in the second session. The stewards penalised Glock five positions for illegally blocking Yamamoto in the first session. De la Rosa incurred the loss of ten places for changing his car's engine between qualifying and the race for the ninth time in the season, exceeding the eight allowed maximum engine switches.

At the pre-race drivers' briefing, Whiting and stewards' advisor Nigel Mansell told drivers if they gained positions on the first lap by using the run-off area at La Source corner as was the case with Kimi Räikkönen at the 2009 event, then they would risk receiving a penalty or they would be told off if deemed to have been forced onto it by another competitor.

=== Qualifying classification ===
The fastest lap in each of the three sessions is denoted in bold.

Pos	No	Driver	Constructor	Q1	Q2	Q3	Grid
1	6	(Australia) Mark Webber	Red Bull-Renault	1:57.352	1:47.253	**1:45.778**	1
2	2	(United Kingdom) Lewis Hamilton	McLaren-Mercedes	1:56.706	**1:46.211**	1:45.863	2
3	11	(Poland) Robert Kubica	Renault	1:56.041	1:47.320	1:46.100	3
4	5	(Germany) Sebastian Vettel	Red Bull-Renault	1:58.487	1:47.245	1:46.127	4
5	1	(United Kingdom) Jenson Button	McLaren-Mercedes	1:57.981	1:46.790	1:46.206	5
6	7	(Brazil) Felipe Massa	Ferrari	1:58.323	1:47.322	1:46.314	6
7	9	(Brazil) Rubens Barrichello	Williams-Cosworth	1:55.757	1:47.797	1:46.602	7
8	14	(Germany) Adrian Sutil	Force India-Mercedes	1:58.730	1:47.292	1:46.659	8
9	10	(Germany) Nico Hülkenberg	Williams-Cosworth	1:55.442	1:47.821	1:47.053	9
10	8	(Spain) Fernando Alonso	Ferrari	1:57.023	1:47.544	1:47.441	10
11	3	(Germany) Michael Schumacher	Mercedes	1:56.313	1:47.874	N/A	21^{1}
12	4	(Germany) Nico Rosberg	Mercedes	**1:54.826**	1:47.885	N/A	14^{2}
13	17	(Spain) Jaime Alguersuari	Toro Rosso-Ferrari	1:58.944	1:48.267	N/A	11
14	15	(Italy) Vitantonio Liuzzi	Force India-Mercedes	2:01.102	1:48.680	N/A	12
15	16	(Switzerland) Sébastien Buemi	Toro Rosso-Ferrari	2:00.386	1:49.209	N/A	16^{3}
16	19	(Finland) Heikki Kovalainen	Lotus-Cosworth	2:01.343	1:50.980	N/A	13
17	24	(Germany) Timo Glock	Virgin-Cosworth	2:01.316	1:52.049	N/A	20^{4}
18	18	(Italy) Jarno Trulli	Lotus-Cosworth	2:01.491	N/A	N/A	15
19	23	(Japan) Kamui Kobayashi	BMW Sauber-Ferrari	2:02.284	N/A	N/A	17
20	21	(Brazil) Bruno Senna	HRT-Cosworth	2:03.612	N/A	N/A	18
21	20	(Japan) Sakon Yamamoto	HRT-Cosworth	2:03.941	N/A	N/A	19
22	22	(Spain) Pedro de la Rosa	BMW Sauber-Ferrari	2:05.294	N/A	N/A	24^{5}
23	25	(Brazil) Lucas di Grassi	Virgin-Cosworth	2:18.754	N/A	N/A	22
24	12	(Russia) Vitaly Petrov	Renault	No time^{6}	N/A	N/A	23

Notes:

- **^1** – Michael Schumacher was penalised ten places on the starting grid for dangerous driving at the Hungarian Grand Prix.
- **^2** – Nico Rosberg received a five-place grid penalty for a gearbox change before qualifying.
- **^3** – Sébastien Buemi was imposed a three-place grid penalty for blocking another driver during the second qualifying session.
- **^4** – Timo Glock earned a five-place grid penalty for illegally blocking another car in the first qualifying session.
- **^5** – Pedro de la Rosa was demoted ten places for his ninth engine switch of the season.
- **^6** – Vitaly Petrov set no qualifying lap time after crashing during the first session.

== Race ==
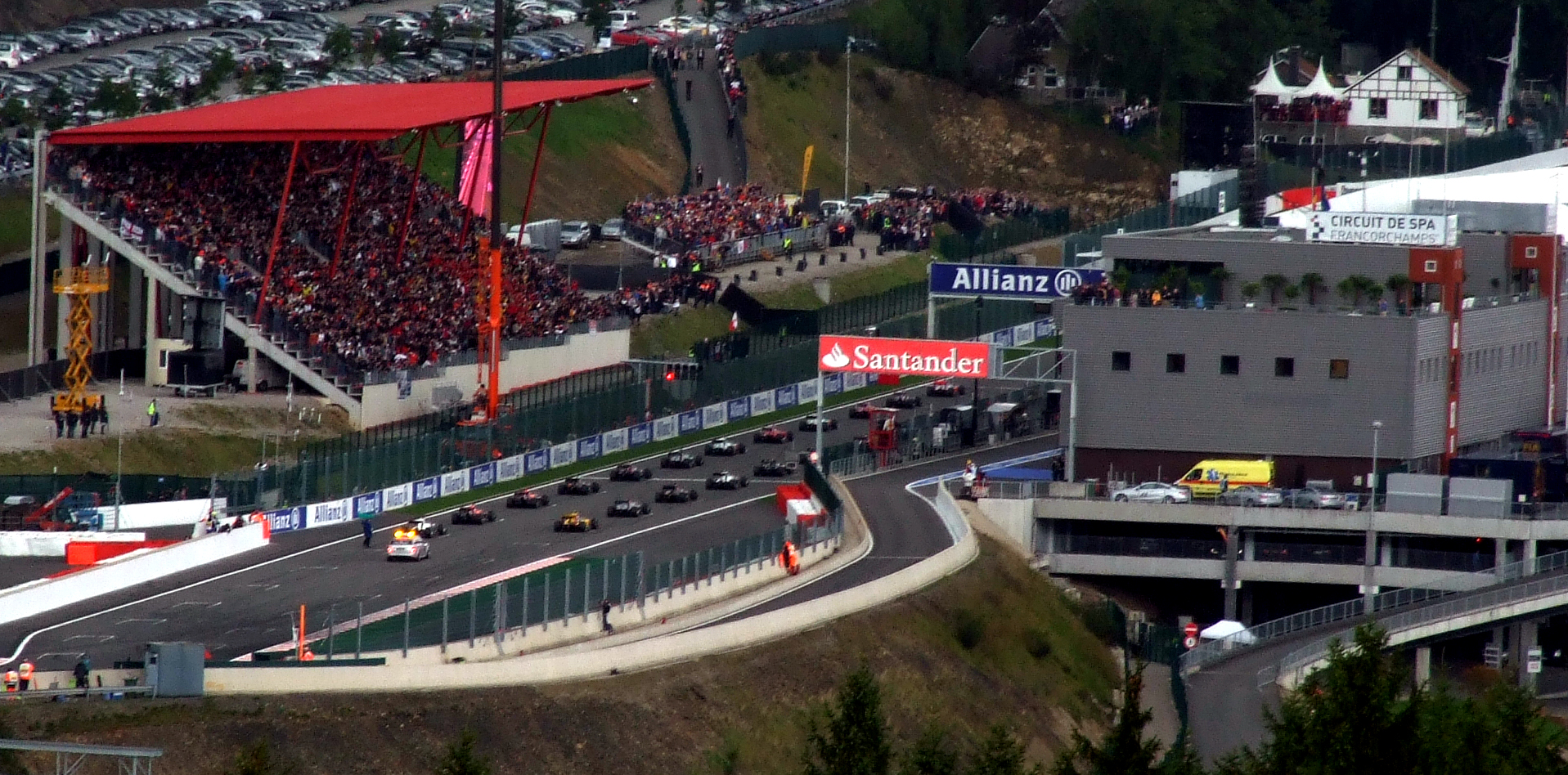
The start of the race under overcast conditions

The 44-lap race started before 60,000 spectators at 14:00 local time. It ran for 44 laps over a distance of 308.052 km (191.415 mi). A 60 per cent chance of rain showers between 14:00 and 15:00 local time were forecast, and at the start, weather conditions were overcast, although some rain had fallen during the support races and there was a large build-up of rain showers to the west of Spa-Francorchamps. The air temperature was between 14 and 16 °C (57 and 61 °F) and the track temperature from 17 to 21 °C (63 to 70 °F). The rain showers observed in the morning's support events altered the level of grip, and tyre strategy had the potential to effect the final finishing order according to Sarah Holt of BBC Sport. Cars were allowed to be changed slightly following the FIA's declaration of a change in climatic conditions post-qualifying. Every driver bar Barrichello, Rosberg and Schumacher began on the soft compound tyre. Before the start, Massa was observed by amateur video footage posted on the internet to have transgressed sporting regulation by being slightly out of position on the grid. He was not punished since neither the marshals, teams or the automatic jump start system relayed the fact to Whiting for him to impose a jump start penalty on Massa.

At the start, Hamilton took the lead from a slow-starting Webber into the La Source hairpin with Kubica second and Button third. Webber allowed the engine revolutions to fall too low, causing his car's Renault engine to go into anti-stall mode and falling to sixth. Hamilton held off Kubica on the outside in the braking zone of Les Combes turn as Button failed to pass Kubica. Sutil clung onto Webber's slipstream and overtook him on the straight for sixth before losing the place by running wide into Les Combes corner. A rain shower began to fall towards the conclusion of the first lap. The rain shower made the back of the track damp through Blanchimont corner and the conditions caused several drivers to run wide at the Bus Stop chicane due to a loss of grip braking for the turn. Button attempted to pass Kubica on the outside but sustained left front wing damage affecting its aerodynamic balance as it became apparent several drivers could not turn into the chicane and drove onto the run-off tarmac.

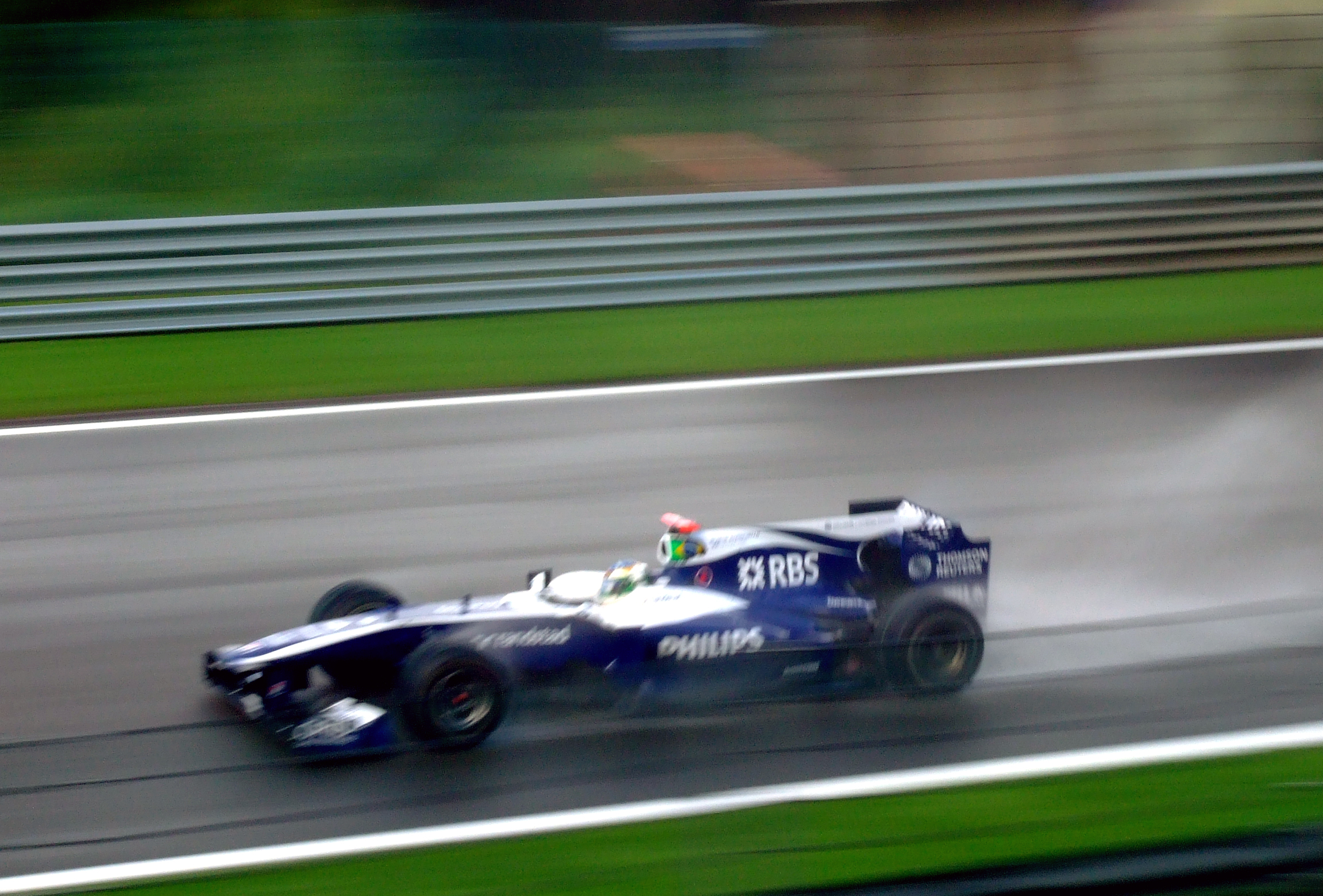
Rubens Barrichello retired from his 300th Grand Prix due to a first lap collision with Fernando Alonso.

Barrichello was unable to stop his car in time in the greasy conditions despite his braking early and struck the side of Alonso's eighth-placed car. Alonso was able to make a pit stop for intermediate tyres as well as other drivers but Barrichello retired with car damage. Button followed the chicane's contours and fell behind Vettel but held off Massa by braking very late for the La Source hairpin. He thus drew to the inside of Vettel and overtook him for third. In the second lap, Hamilton experienced a minor loss of control of his car through Eau Rouge turn but retained the lead. Kubica used his F-duct system but ran wide onto the outside run-off area, promoting Button to second. Vettel was forced wide by the rejoining Kubica and protested over the radio. Webber passed Massa on the inside for fifth before the safety car was dispatched at lap two's conclusion, as a consequence of the first lap accident between Alonso and Barrichello as Barrichello's car was being removed from the circuit. The leaders remained on the track as three drivers lower down the order made pit stops for intermediate tyres. The rain abated on lap three as a blue sky began to appear through the clouds.

The safety car was withdrawn at the conclusion of lap three and racing resumed with Hamilton leading his teammate Button. Hamilton ran wide at the La Source hairpin and blocked his teammate Button from passing him for the lead, while Vettel used the restart to pass Kubica for third at the same hairpin. Sutil's higher straightline speed moved him past Hülkenberg for seventh to nullify an earlier illegal pass by the latter on the former at the Bus Stop chicane. Button's handling difficulties caused by front wing damage allowed his teammate Hamilton to pull away from the rest of the field to be 4.8 seconds ahead by lap seven. On lap six, Senna, nursing front wing damage, drove slowly into the pit lane to retire with rear-left suspension failure that caused him to spin. Vettel drew close to Button as he went faster uphill through Eau Rouge but him hitting his rev limiter on the Kemmel straight into the braking area for Les Combes corner and the effectiveness of the McLaren's F-duct system allowing for a longer gear ratio and a tailwind kept Button ahead. During lap 11, Petrov overtook Rosberg on the outside for ninth into Les Combes turn and put the latter wide. Having noticed Petrov's overtake on his teammate, Schumacher passed Rosberg on the outside for tenth eapproaching Malmedy corner, with Schumacher's rear wheel and Rosberg's front wing endplate colliding.

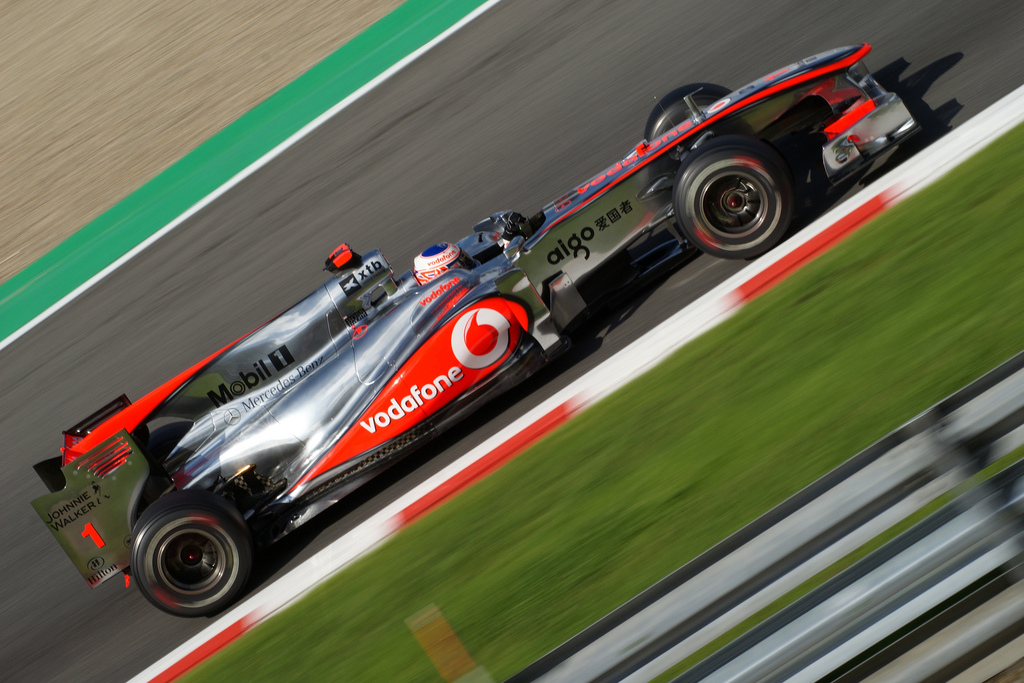
Jenson Button retired from the race as a result of a collision with Sebastian Vettel.

Light rain began to fall on lap 16. That same lap, Vettel got a run on the conservatively braking Button on the inside into the Bus Stop chicane. Vettel suddenly switched to the outside line and lost control of his car by hitting a bump on the damp circuit as he was unable to correct an opposite lock at high speed. He struck the left-hand sidepod on Button's car, exposing its radiator and causing Button's retirement. Vettel entered the pit lane for a replacement front wing and fell to 12th position. The accident promoted Kubica to second and Webber to third. The stewards informed the Red Bull team the collision would be investigated and decided to impose a drive-through penalty on Vettel on the 20th lap. Vettel was informed of the penalty by his race engineer, and took it on the next lap. He rejoined in 14th place. Sutil was the first of the leaders to make a scheduled pit stop for the medium compound tyres on lap 22. Red Bull responded by calling Webber into the pit lane on the next lap, followed in turn by Kubica and Massa on lap 24. Kubica rejoined ahead of Webber and held off the latter into Les Combes turn.

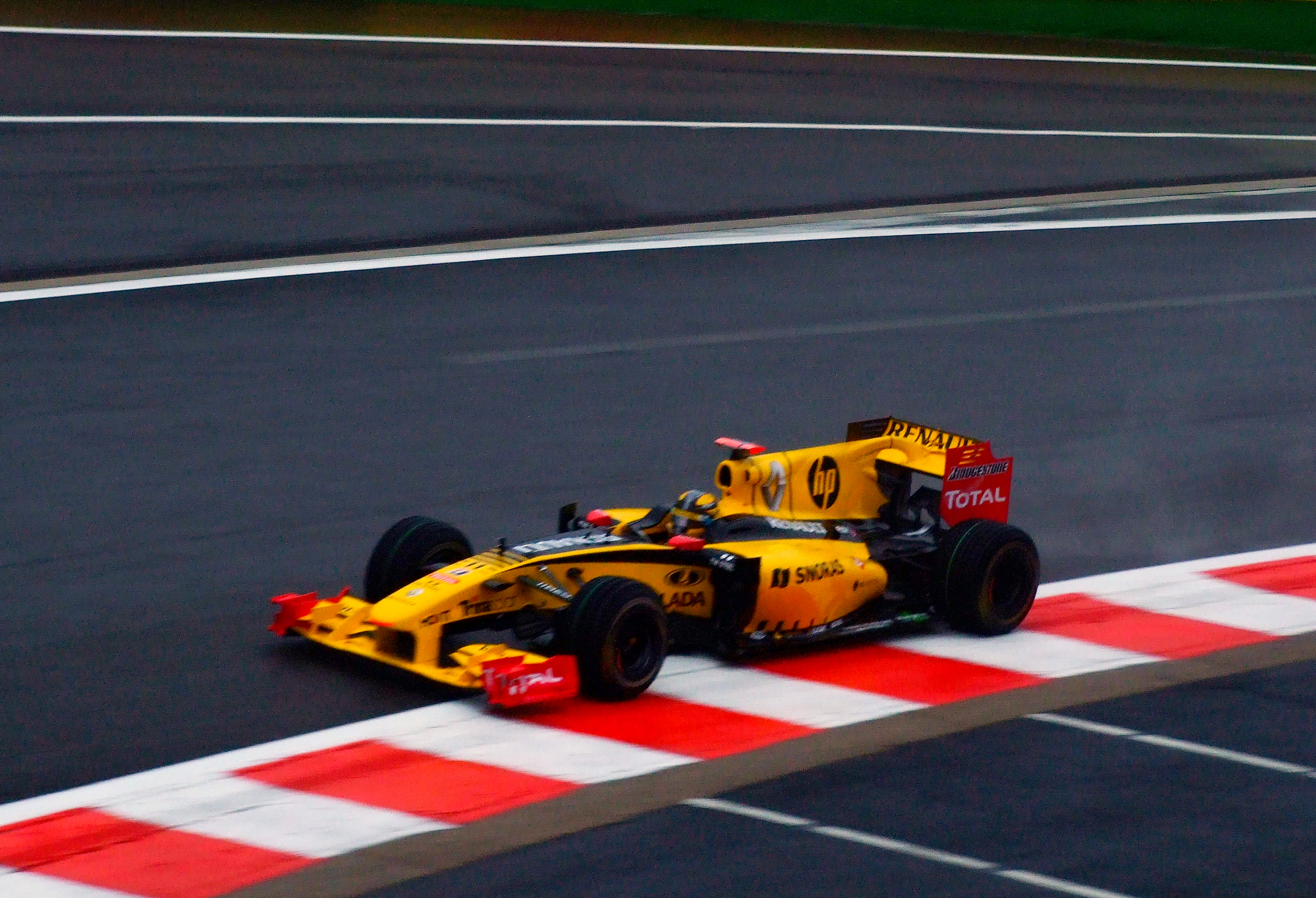
Robert Kubica finished third for the Renault team

On lap 25, Hamilton made his first pit stop and retained the lead. Sutil overtook Schumacher uphill into Les Combes turn for fifth on the lap. On lap 26, Vettel overtook Liuzzi at the Bus Stop chicane but Liuzzi's right-front wing endplate punctured Vettel's left-rear tyre. Vettel was unable to enter the pit lane and had to do a full lap before stopping for the soft compound tyres and fell to 20th; Liuzzi immediately made a pit stop for a front wing replacement. On lap 31, Hamilton led Kubica by 11.2 seconds, who in turn, was 2.3 seconds ahead of Webber in third. As Alonso challenged Kobayashi for eighth, light rain again began to fall on lap 34. At first, the track was slightly wet and made drivers unsure when to make pit stops for wet-weather tyres. Drivers began to make pit stops for wet-weather tyres on lap 35. On that lap, Hamilton was unable to slow enough in the slippery conditions due to tyre locking and slid into the gravel trap at Rivage corner. Hamilton made light contact with the wall with his front wing but had enough traction to get himself out of the gravel and return to the track in the lead.

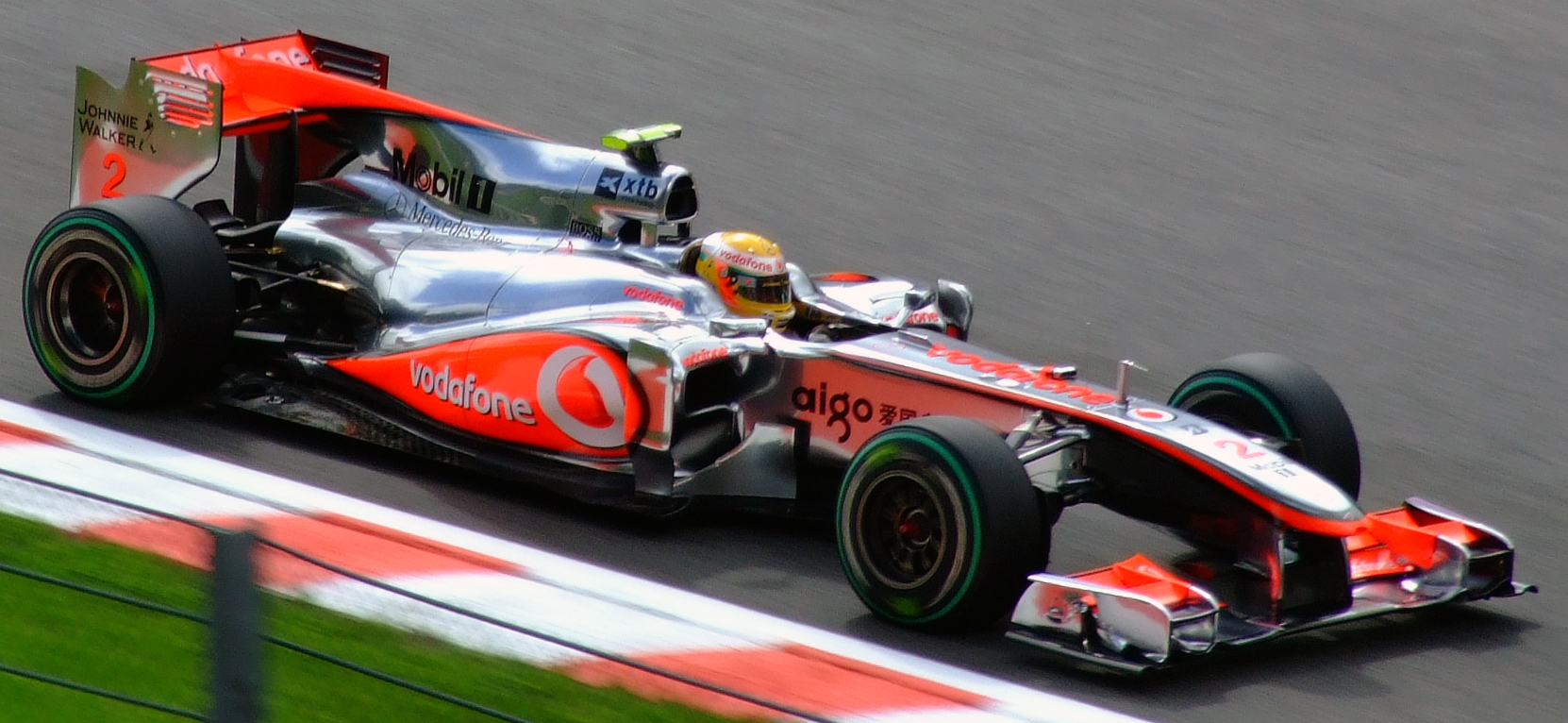
Lewis Hamilton achieved his 14th career victory and retook the lead of the World Drivers' Championship.

The first three drivers entered the pit lane at the lap's end. Kubica had a problematic pit stop: he overshot his pit box through braking too late and glanced the legs of a team member because he was distracted with the switches on his steering wheel for car adjustments. Kubica's delay moved Webber to second as Hamilton retained the lead. On lap 38, the safety car was deployed for a second time because of an accident requiring marshal intervention. Alonso ran wide on the paint marking the outside kerb exiting Les Combes turn and into Malmedy corner and lost control of his car. He veered across the track to the inside and crashed into the tyre wall, fracturing his front-right suspension before stopping in the circuit's centre. The crash forced Alonso to retire from the race. The safety car was withdrawn at the conclusion of lap 40 for four laps of racing. Hamilton led Webber in second and Kubica in third. Into Les Combes turn, Rosberg overtook Kobayashi and then his teammate Schumacher on the outside for sixth by forcing him wide on the inside kerbs. Alguersuari cut the Bus Stop chicane and passed Liuzzi for tenth on lap 42.

At the front, Hamilton took his third win of the season and the 14th of his career, (Note: Hamilton finished first in the 2008 Belgian Grand Prix but was penalised for an illegal manoevure.) at an average speed of 207.509 km/h (128.940 mph). Webber followed 1.571 seconds later in second and Kubica finished in third place. Massa secured fourth, holding off Sutil in fifth. The Mercedes pair of Rosberg and Schumacher finished sixth and seventh following the team's decision to keep their drivers on track for longer and were just more than a second ahead of eighth-placed Kobayashi. Petrov was ninth and Algersuari provisionally tenth. Liuzzi came 11th with De la Rosa 12th after a late race error sent him into the gravel at Curve Paul Frere corner when closing up on Petrov. Buemi was provisionally 13th after sustaining diffuser damage and a tyre puncture when another driver struck the rear of his car. Hülkenberg, 14th, had faulty throttle control causing him to spin multiple times and requiring him to make an extra pit stop. Vettel was 15th, with Kovalainen after a poor start caused by his engine's anti-stall system activating and Di Grassi 16th and 17th. Di Grassi stated Kovalainen overtook him off the circuit at Les Combes corner but no punishments were issued by the stewards. Glock in 18th lost performance on a set of full-wet tyres before the second rain shower and ran a new front wing after demolishing a brake marker board on lap one. Trulli and Yamamoto were the final classified finishers.

== Post-race ==
The top three drivers appeared on the podium to collect their trophies and spoke to the media in a later press conference. Hamilton described it as "a very, very tough race" for himself and said the victory "absolutely" made up for two years prior, adding: "At the end it was just about nursing the car home and bringing it back in one piece. Just trying to keep a small gap between myself and Mark and try to bag those points." Webber said he was satisfied to finish second and agreed with the importance of scoring as many championship points as possible when race wins are not attainable: "These days it is very, very easy to come away with nothing with a small mistake from anybody, from the cockpit, pit wall or pit stops or whatever." Kubica stated he did not believe others would think Renault would be competitive in Belgium and noted their results in each of the sessions, adding: "It was a very tricky race but we've seen very good pace. Started third, managed to finish third, of course thanks to some bad luck and good luck, but it was a good place."

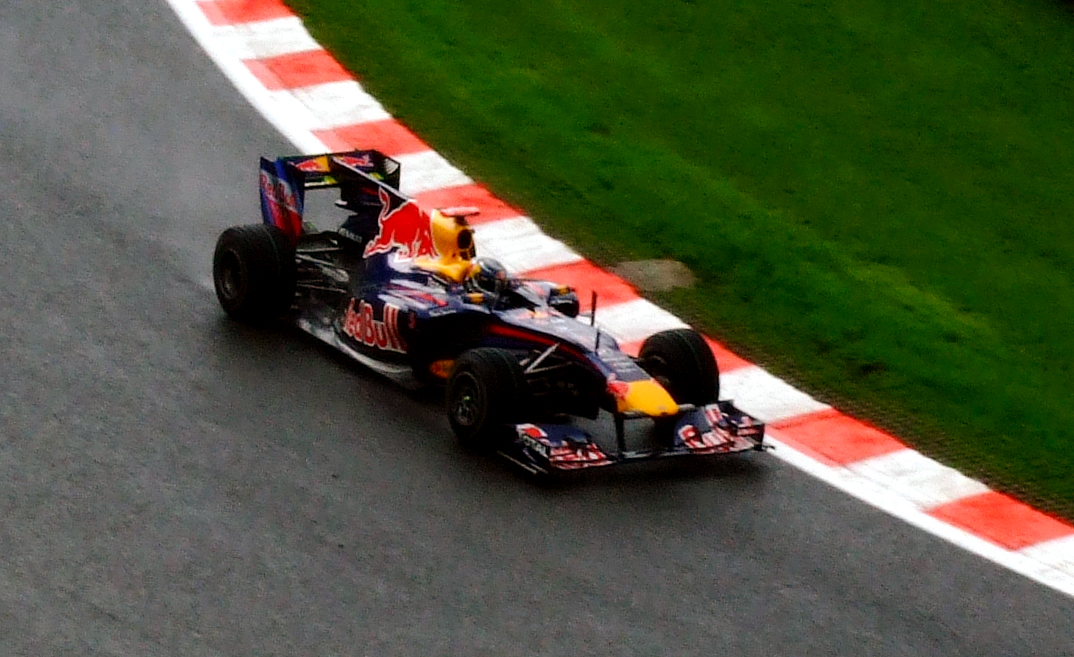
Sebastian Vettel, who finished 15th, apologised for the collision with Button

Vettel apologised for the collision with Button that eliminated the latter from the race. He said: "Obviously it was not my intention to destroy his race or mine. I was close, I was faster than him. The moment Robert [Kubica] got close behind I knew that he could pass us on the straight because we are not the fastest on the straight. I was very close a couple of times, unfortunately never really close enough." Button described the crash as "a strange incident and so sad because I was fighting for second position", adding: "I defended my line about three inches on the inside and perhaps Sebastian got confused as to which direction to go... I'm guessing he [Vettel] thought I was going to pull from the left and he went on the inside. But he got a little rattled and didn't know which way to go." Martin Whitmarsh, the McLaren team principal, commented on the collision: "It was not what you would expect to see in F1 – more reminiscent of junior formulae. A drive-through seemed a pretty light punishment to me. It was a bit of a strange mistake I have to say. I realise it was not intentional but it was a pretty strange one really." Red Bull team principal Christian Horner argued Button braked early and that the accident was unintentional while motorsport advisor Helmut Marko said Vettel could not fellow Button for longer since the latter was slower.

After reviewing video evidence and the change in the weather, the race stewards imposed no penalty or a caution for the first lap collision between Alonso and Barrichello, which they deemed "a racing incident". Barrichello said he was sorry to have hit Alonso and called it downheartening for the Williams team: "We've had such a positive weekend that a good result would have been a nice conclusion." Describing his race as the first of seven "finals", Alonso commented: "we will have to make up the ground lost today somewhere else." Schumacher gained 14 positions from 21st to 7th, commenting: "Honestly I lost the overview of where I was at certain moments. Because I wasn't following the pit wall in terms of position, I was watching the weather all the time. And all the time I was quite busy with the steering wheel!"

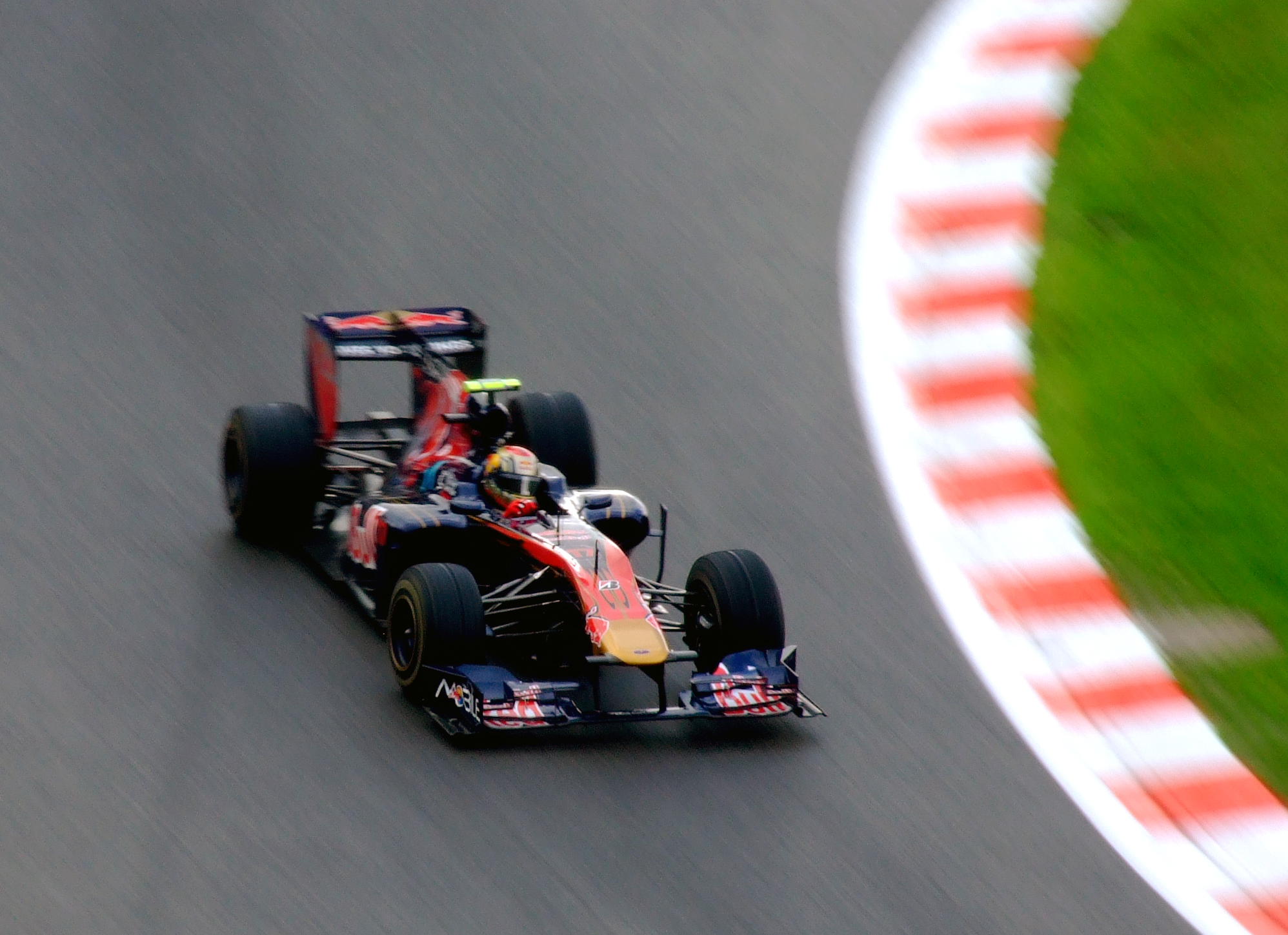
Jaime Alguersuari was penalised 20 seconds for cutting the Bus Stop chicane to pass another driver.

The stewards added 20 seconds to Alguersuari's overall race time in lieu of a drive-through penalty after deeming him to have illegally cut the Bus Stop chicane to pass Liuzzi for tenth on lap 42. The penalty demoted Alguersuari to 13th and elevated Liuzzi to the final points-scoring place of 10th. The FIA opened an investigation into how Massa began just ahead of his grid slot without the error being detected in time. Massa said his short stature prevented him from observing the lines well: "I was a little bit outside, and that was it." The result returned Hamilton atop World Drivers' Championship with 182 championship points. Webber fell to second with 179 championship points as his teammate Vettel remained third with 151 championship points. With a respective 147 and 141 championship points, Button and Alonso were fourth and fifth. McLaren with 329 championship points lowered Red Bull's (330) World Constructors' Championship lead to one point. With 250 championship points, Ferrari were third with Mercedes with 146 championship points and Renault with 123 championship points fourth and fifth with six races left in the season.

=== Race classification ===
Drivers who scored championship points are denoted in bold.

Pos	No	Driver	Constructor	Laps	Time/Retired	Grid	Points
1	2	(United Kingdom) **Lewis Hamilton**	**McLaren-Mercedes**	44	1:29:04.268	2	25
2	6	(Australia) **Mark Webber**	**Red Bull-Renault**	44	+1.571	1	18
3	11	(Poland) **Robert Kubica**	**Renault**	44	+3.493	3	15
4	7	(Brazil) **Felipe Massa**	**Ferrari**	44	+8.264	6	12
5	14	(Germany) **Adrian Sutil**	**Force India-Mercedes**	44	+9.094	8	10
6	4	(Germany) **Nico Rosberg**	**Mercedes**	44	+12.359	14	8
7	3	(Germany) **Michael Schumacher**	**Mercedes**	44	+15.548	21	6
8	23	(Japan) **Kamui Kobayashi**	**BMW Sauber-Ferrari**	44	+16.678	17	4
9	12	(Russia) **Vitaly Petrov**	**Renault**	44	+23.851	23	2
10	15	(Italy) **Vitantonio Liuzzi**	**Force India-Mercedes**	44	+34.831	12	1
11	22	(Spain) Pedro de la Rosa	BMW Sauber-Ferrari	44	+36.019	24	
12	16	(Switzerland) Sébastien Buemi	Toro Rosso-Ferrari	44	+39.895	16	
13	17	(Spain) Jaime Alguersuari	Toro Rosso-Ferrari	44	+49.457^{7}	11	
14	10	(Germany) Nico Hülkenberg	Williams-Cosworth	43	+1 Lap	9	
15	5	(Germany) Sebastian Vettel	Red Bull-Renault	43	+1 Lap	4	
16	19	(Finland) Heikki Kovalainen	Lotus-Cosworth	43	+1 Lap	13	
17	25	(Brazil) Lucas di Grassi	Virgin-Cosworth	43	+1 Lap	22	
18	24	(Germany) Timo Glock	Virgin-Cosworth	43	+1 Lap	20	
19	18	(Italy) Jarno Trulli	Lotus-Cosworth	43	+1 Lap	15	
20	20	(Japan) Sakon Yamamoto	HRT-Cosworth	42	+2 Laps	19	
Ret	8	(Spain) Fernando Alonso	Ferrari	37	Accident	10	
Ret	1	(United Kingdom) Jenson Button	McLaren-Mercedes	15	Collision Damage	5	
Ret	21	(Brazil) Bruno Senna	HRT-Cosworth	5	Suspension	18	
Ret	9	(Brazil) Rubens Barrichello	Williams-Cosworth	0	Collision	7	

Notes:

- **^7** – Jaime Alguersuari received a 20-second time penalty for being deemed to have illegally cut the Bus Stop chicane to pass another driver.

== Championship standings after the race ==
Drivers' Championship standings

+/–	Pos.	Driver	Points
1	1	(United Kingdom) Lewis Hamilton	182
1	2	(Australia) Mark Webber	179
	3	(Germany) Sebastian Vettel	151
	4	(United Kingdom) Jenson Button	147
	5	(Spain) Fernando Alonso	141

Constructors' Championship standings

+/–	Pos.	Driver	Points
	1	(Austria) Red Bull-Renault	330
	2	(United Kingdom) McLaren-Mercedes	329
	3	(Italy) Ferrari	250
	4	(Germany) Mercedes	146
	5	(France) Renault	123
Sources:

- Note: Only the top five positions are included for both sets of standings.

== See also ==
- 2010 Spa-Francorchamps GP2 Series rounds
- 2010 Spa-Francorchamps GP3 Series round

== Explanatory notes ==
Previous race: 2010 Hungarian Grand Prix	FIA Formula One World Championship; 2010 season	Next race: 2010 Italian Grand Prix
Previous race: 2009 Belgian Grand Prix	Belgian Grand Prix	Next race: 2011 Belgian Grand Prix
