= 2010 Hungarian Grand Prix =

Race 12 of 19 in the 2010 Formula One World Championship
← Previous race	Next race →
- The Hungaroring

Race details
- Date: 1 August 2010
- Official name: Formula 1 Eni Magyar Nagydíj 2010
- Location: Hungaroring, Mogyoród, Hungary
- Course: Permanent racing facility
- Course length: 4.381 km (2.722 miles)
- Distance: 70 laps, 306.630 km (190.531 miles)
- Weather: Mainly sunny 28 °C (82 °F)

Pole position
Driver	(Germany) Sebastian Vettel	Red Bull-Renault
- Time: 1:18.773

Fastest lap
Driver	(Germany) Sebastian Vettel	Red Bull-Renault
- Time: 1:22.362 on lap 70

Podium
First	(Australia) Mark Webber	Red Bull-Renault
Second	(Spain) Fernando Alonso	Ferrari
Third	(Germany) Sebastian Vettel	Red Bull-Renault

The 2010 Hungarian Grand Prix (formally the Formula 1 Eni Magyar Nagydíj 2010) was the twelfth round of the 2010 Formula One season. It was held in Hungaroring, Hungary on 1 August 2010. Red Bull driver Mark Webber claimed his fourth victory of the season, and reclaimed the championship lead after Lewis Hamilton's retirement from the race. Ferrari's Fernando Alonso and Webber's teammate Sebastian Vettel completed the podium by finishing second and third, respectively.

Pedro de la Rosa scored his last World Championship points at this race.

== Report ==
=== Background ===
Sakon Yamamoto continued to replace Karun Chandhok at Hispania Racing, alongside Bruno Senna. The drivers' representative on the stewards' panel was Derek Warwick for the second time this season, after he was in the role at the Spanish Grand Prix.

=== Free practice ===
Red Bull continued their on-track dominance in the first session, with both Sebastian Vettel and Mark Webber setting lap times over a second faster than their nearest challenger, the Renault of Robert Kubica.

Felipe Massa was the first driver to take to the circuit, where he was observed to take the stretch between the third and fourth turn – the scene of his injury in 2009 – quite slowly. After Ferrari's dominant display in Germany, the Italian team was noticeably off the pace in Budapest, with Fernando Alonso placing seventh and Massa finishing ninth at the end of the first session. At McLaren, Jenson Button led the way with the fourth-fastest time whilst Lewis Hamilton was crippled with an undisclosed technical glitch and frustrations with the balance of his car that left him eighteenth and the last driver ahead of the new teams, who were once again led by Jarno Trulli. The circuit's notoriously dusty surface triggered several spins with the most notable being Vitaly Petrov who lost control in the final bend and found himself splayed across the entrance to the front straight, though he was able to return to the pits. Force India, who were running test driver Paul di Resta in place of Vitantonio Liuzzi were fined €5,000 for another tyre mix-up when di Resta used a set of tyres that were a part of Liuzzi's Saturday allocation.

The second session was once again led by Vettel and Red Bull, though the gap to the rest of the field was considerably smaller, with Alonso half a second adrift and Webber in third ahead of Massa. The most notable performance came from Petrov who, despite his earlier spin and a time two seconds down on the leaders, placed fifth overall, just a second behind Vettel and a tenth of a second faster than teammate Kubica. Lewis Hamilton recovered from his technical problems and found a setup he was happier with to take sixth. As with the first session, the second remained incident-free. Heikki Kovalainen was forced to sit out the bulk of the ninety minutes with hydraulics problems – a recurrent theme for all of the new teams – while Alonso tore a chunk out of one of the kerbs late in the session. Several drivers ran off the road, notably at turn seven, whilst Adrian Sutil struggled with an electrical fault.

=== Qualifying ===
Heavy rain was expected to interrupt the session, and while clouds started to materialise over the final few corners of the circuit, the hour-long session remained free of rain. Red Bull were once again the early pace-setters, with pundits and commentators expecting the fight for pole to be between Vettel and Webber and possibly Alonso, the only driver who had been in touch with them all weekend. The fight to avoid elimination was intense, with several drivers including Michael Schumacher, Jenson Button and Adrian Sutil exchanging fastest laps to avoid eighteenth position and join the Virgin, Lotus and Hispania drivers in the knockout zone. In the end, Kamui Kobayashi suffered the ignominy of being eliminated in Q1; although he had been on a flying lap at the very end of the first period that, based on sector times, would have been enough to keep his qualifying session alive, he cruelly encountered traffic in the final sequence of bends. With his lap compromised, he aborted his run and returned to the pits. In his frustration he missed the scrutineering weighbridge completely, and was later given a five-place grid penalty for the transgression, shunting him back to the last row of the grid alongside Sakon Yamamoto. Elsewhere, Timo Glock was the fastest of the new teams; the last car to set a time in the first period, he upstaged Heikki Kovalainen by just a few hundredths of a second.

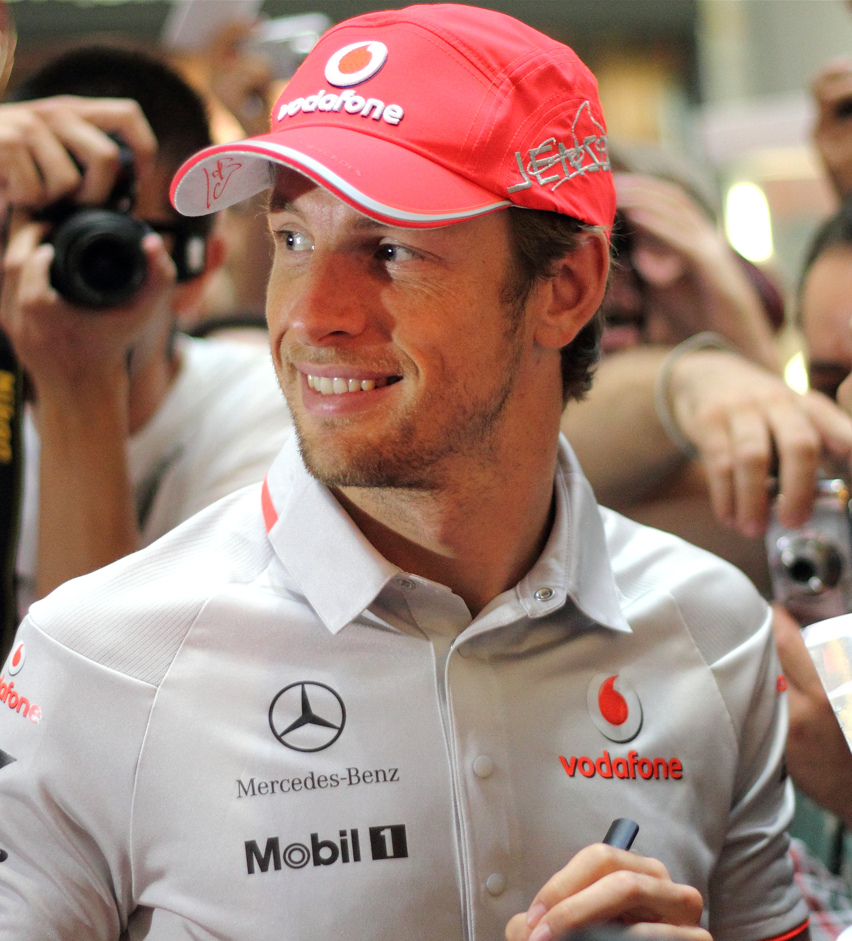
Jenson Button qualified his McLaren in eleventh position.

Where Vettel claimed the fastest time of the first period, Mark Webber was the fastest in the second, with Alonso once again in third. Renault's Vitaly Petrov was the big surprise, taking fourth place and proving that his pace in the practice sessions was genuine. Although the gap between Red Bull and everyone else remained constant at a second, it was a hard-fought battle for the minor placings as several drivers struggled to promote themselves to the final qualifying period. Sébastien Buemi and Jaime Alguersuari were busy taking fastest times out of one another, but the real fight was once again for the final places in the next period, with Button, Nico Rosberg and the Williams drivers of Rubens Barrichello and Nico Hülkenberg and fighting to stay alive. Where Hülkenberg and Rosberg slipped through, Button could only manage eleventh and his former teammate Barrichello twelfth, with the reigning World Champion missing the cut by just two thousandths of a second. Adrian Sutil was able to take thirteenth alongside countryman Michael Schumacher, with Buemi, an anonymous Vitantonio Liuzzi and Alguersuari filling up the lower midfield places.

In the third and final session, it was reported that Petrov, Pedro de la Rosa and Hülkenberg had not been expecting to advance to the final period, and were therefore out of fresh sets of the softer option tyres. Petrov and de la Rosa both opted for a one-run strategy to preserve their tyres, as did Robert Kubica in the second Renault. Hülkenberg elected to run in two stints, but as in Germany, he discovered that his tyres were too worn to set a competitive time by the end of the session. De la Rosa experienced similar difficulties, taking ninth from Hülkenberg by just two thousandths of a second. At the business end of the grid, Sebastian Vettel set his fastest time yet, which even he could not beat on his second lap even though it was still good enough for pole, whilst Mark Webber could not improve much from his Q2 time. By the end of the session, Red Bull were once again first and second, giving the team eleven pole positions from twelve attempts in 2010. Vettel himself was over a second faster than Alonso, with Webber falling just shy of the enviable mark. These times, combined with footage broadcast by Formula One Management that showed both the Red Bulls and Ferraris running with front wings that were notably closer to the road than their rivals, re-ignited the debate over flexible front wings, with McLaren and Mercedes GP in particular approaching the FIA for clarification as to the rules.

Elsewhere, Lewis Hamilton took advantage of Jenson Button's early Q2 exit to qualify fifth behind Felipe Massa, the 2008 World Champion looking to secure a good result and put as much space between himself and his teammate as possible in the championship standings. Nico Rosberg endured the hour-long session despite coming dangerously close to elimination on two occasions to line up alongside Hamilton in sixth, whilst Vitaly Petrov became the twelfth and final man to out-qualify his teammate in 2010. An early mistake on Kubica's first flying lap saw the Pole struggle, and while his second run was quicker, Petrov hit back on used rubber to take seventh by a tenth of a second at the end of the session.

=== Race ===
Several drivers predicted that "up to seventy percent" of the final race result would be settled in the first corner, owing to the tight and twisty nature of the Hungaroring circuit. Despite the pace of the Red Bulls in qualifying, the third-placed Fernando Alonso was able to muscle his way into second position ahead of Mark Webber by the first turn. The other big movers were Vitaly Petrov, who passed Lewis Hamilton for fifth at the first corner - though he conceded the place to the 2008 World Champion the next lap when he found he could not get heat into his tyres - and Kamui Kobayashi, who surged from 23rd on the grid to 16th. Jaime Alguersuari's race was over after just one lap, with the Ferrari engine in his Toro Rosso spewing coolant fluid across the first sector of the circuit without warning.

Sebastian Vettel streaked away from Alonso and Webber at a rate of almost a second a lap, at least partially confirming the idea that the team would have an incredibly easy race. But a disruption occurred on lap fifteen when Vitantonio Liuzzi made contact with an unidentified driver and lost his front wing at turn eleven. This prompted the deployment of the safety car and a string of pit stops. Vettel narrowly made the pit entry at the last moment. Problems began further down the order when Nico Rosberg left his garage with a loose right-rear tyre. The tyre came free almost straight away and bounced down the pit lane through the Williams pit box, and striking a mechanic Nigel Hope, who was bruised. Renault were able to pit Vitaly Petrov and release him to the circuit in sequence, but the Renault lollipop man released Robert Kubica into the path of Adrian Sutil, who at the time was attempting to enter his own pit box immediately following the Renault pit. The collision ended Sutil's participation. Renault themselves were fined US$50,000 for an unsafe pit release, and Kubica was served with a ten-second stop-go penalty for causing an avoidable pit lane accident.

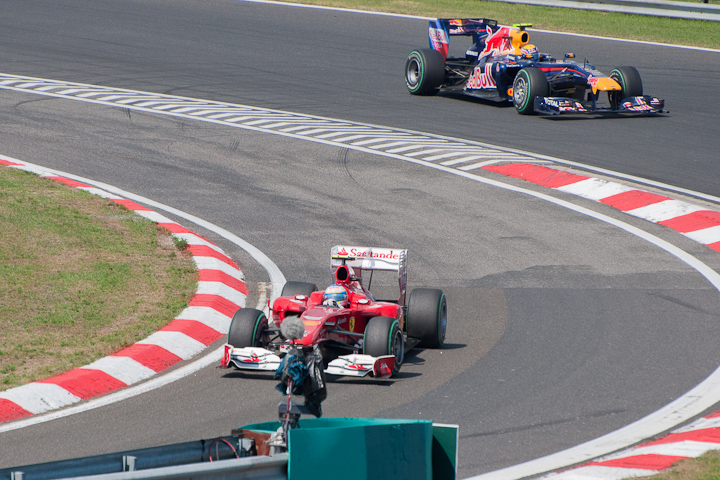
Fernando Alonso pits while Mark Webber stays on track. Webber was able to pass Alonso after making his pit stop later in the race compared to Alonso.

While most of the leaders pitted in the three laps the safety car was on the circuit, Webber remained a notable exception. Having passed Vettel when the German was in the pits, Webber was now the first on the road. Red Bull began formulating a strategy so that the Australian could pit and rejoin the circuit ahead of Alonso. Vettel was later issued a drive-through penalty after violating Article 40.9 of the Sporting Regulations. Vettel fell more than ten car lengths behind the safety car, and he was penalised. Like the controversial penalty given to Lewis Hamilton in Valencia, the rule - designed to stop teams from manipulating the field for strategy purposes under safety car conditions - has rarely been broken in the modern era of the sport, and Vettel was visibly angry about being penalised for it, feeling that it had cost him certain victory. He rejoined the circuit behind Alonso in third, and would spend the rest of the race trying to find his way around the Ferrari.

At the front of the field, Webber introduced a very simple strategy of driving as fast as he could for as long as he could, intending to dial out enough of a lead over Alonso so that he could pit without risking his position. His strategy, originally designed to secure second place for him was now offering him the very real chance of victory. Elsewhere, Renault elected to retire Kubica's car with suspected damage from the collision with Sutil so as to preserve its physical condition, whilst Lewis Hamilton retired from fourth place with a gearbox problem on the same lap. As the final retirement of the race, Hamilton's exit meant that for the first time in 2010, all three new teams would see both their cars finish the race. Lotus would once again take line honours, with Kovalainen and Trulli finishing ahead of Timo Glock, and the second Virgin of Lucas di Grassi finished between the Hispanias of Senna and Yamamoto.

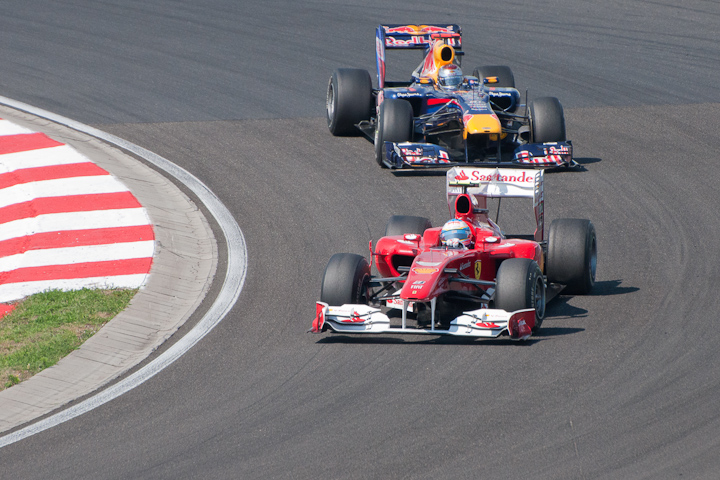
Sebastian Vettel finished behind Fernando Alonso.

Vettel caught Alonso and the pair battled over second while Webber continued to extend his lead. The Australian's task was made much more difficult by the presence of backmarkers on the short, tight circuit, but when he pitted on lap 42, he emerged five seconds ahead of Alonso. The only other major position change came when Rubens Barrichello - the second front-running driver who did not pit as a response to Liuzzi's safety car - made his compulsory stop from fifth position. Williams had been attempting a similar strategy to BMW Sauber with Kamui Kobayashi in Valencia by having Barrichello pit late and charge back up through the field on super-soft tyres. Unlike Webber, Barrichello was unable to preserve his position and slipped down the order to eleventh behind Schumacher. He then attempted to glide through the field with ease, but quickly became trapped behind his former teammate. Things came to a head late in the race when Barrichello was able to get close enough to pass Schumacher on the main straight, but Schumacher attempted to pin Barrichello to the wall and force him to back off. However, Schumacher's move came too late, and Barrichello was already alongside him when the Mercedes driver moved over. Barrichello very nearly made contact with the concrete pit wall and was forced across the pit exit, but took the place from Schumacher, who was placed under investigation by the stewards for dangerous driving. He was later issued a ten-place grid penalty for his actions, to be taken at the next race in Belgium.

With Webber so far in front, he was able to coast to victory by nearly twenty seconds. Vettel could not find a way past Fernando Alonso and had to settle for third, whilst Felipe Massa was fourth for Ferrari. Petrov and Nico Hülkenberg took their career-best finishes to date with fifth and sixth places respectively, whilst Pedro de la Rosa and Kobayashi in the BMW Saubers were split by a recovering Jenson Button, all a lap down. Barrichello's late move on Schumacher netted tenth and the final points-scoring place for the Brazilian, whilst Schumacher's eleventh meant that Mercedes GP failed to score for the first time in 2010.

=== Post-race ===
The top three drivers appeared on the podium to collect their trophies and spoke to the media at a later press conference. Red Bull team mechanic Darren Nicholls appeared on the podium to receive the winning manufacturer's award. In response to repeated questions regarding the flexible front wing row that gripped the Budapest paddock, the FIA promised to invoke a clause in the rules and regulations that would allow them to place greater stresses on the front wings of both the Red Bull and Ferrari cars at the Belgian Grand Prix.

Schumacher's aggressive driving in attempting to prevent Barrichello from overtaking drew strong criticism from commentators and former drivers, including triple World Champion Niki Lauda and former Schumacher teammates Eddie Irvine and Martin Brundle. Triple World Champion Jackie Stewart commented "We are never more than a millimetre away from something awful happening and for Schumacher to do what he did with Rubens Barrichello is just inviting disaster. ... It was one of the most blatant abuses of another driver that I have seen. It is a terrible example from a man who has seven world titles, bully-boy tactics." Schumacher publicly defended his actions after the race and in the Stewards' hearing but subsequently admitted that he was wrong and apologised to Barrichello. Derek Warwick, one of the stewards for the race, commented that Schumacher could have been shown the black flag, resulting in an instant disqualification, had there been more time left in the race for the stewards to review the video evidence. Schumacher was previously shown a black flag earlier in his career, at the 1994 British Grand Prix, for ignoring a 5-second stop-and-go penalty; he received a two race ban for ignoring the black flag and continuing to race rather than returning to the pits as instructed.

The result enabled Webber to reclaim the championship lead from Hamilton by four points after previously sitting in third entering the Hungarian Grand Prix. His teammate Vettel advanced to third with 151 points, with Button and Alonso within ten points in fourth and fifth, respectively. Meanwhile, the lead in the Constructors' Championship was now occupied by Red Bull, distancing previous leaders McLaren by eight points.

== Classification ==
=== Qualifying ===
Pos	No	Driver	Constructor	Part 1	Part 2	Part 3	Grid
1	5	(Germany) Sebastian Vettel	Red Bull-Renault	1:20.417	1:19.573	1:18.773	1
2	6	(Australia) Mark Webber	Red Bull-Renault	1:21.132	1:19.531	1:19.184	2
3	8	(Spain) Fernando Alonso	Ferrari	1:21.278	1:20.237	1:19.987	3
4	7	(Brazil) Felipe Massa	Ferrari	1:21.299	1:20.857	1:20.331	4
5	2	(United Kingdom) Lewis Hamilton	McLaren-Mercedes	1:21.455	1:20.877	1:20.499	5
6	4	(Germany) Nico Rosberg	Mercedes	1:21.212	1:20.811	1:21.082	6
7	12	(Russia) Vitaly Petrov	Renault	1:21.558	1:20.797	1:21.229	7
8	11	(Poland) Robert Kubica	Renault	1:21.159	1:20.867	1:21.328	8
9	22	(Spain) Pedro de la Rosa	BMW Sauber-Ferrari	1:21.891	1:21.273	1:21.411	9
10	10	(Germany) Nico Hülkenberg	Williams-Cosworth	1:21.598	1:21.275	1:21.710	10
11	1	(United Kingdom) Jenson Button	McLaren-Mercedes	1:21.422	1:21.292		11
12	9	(Brazil) Rubens Barrichello	Williams-Cosworth	1:21.478	1:21.331		12
13	14	(Germany) Adrian Sutil	Force India-Mercedes	1:22.080	1:21.517		13
14	3	(Germany) Michael Schumacher	Mercedes	1:21.840	1:21.630		14
15	16	(Switzerland) Sébastien Buemi	Toro Rosso-Ferrari	1:21.982	1:21.897		15
16	15	(Italy) Vitantonio Liuzzi	Force India-Mercedes	1:21.789	1:21.927		16
17	17	(Spain) Jaime Alguersuari	Toro Rosso-Ferrari	1:21.978	1:21.998		17
18	23	(Japan) Kamui Kobayashi	BMW Sauber-Ferrari	1:22.222			23^{1}
19	24	(Germany) Timo Glock	Virgin-Cosworth	1:24.050			18
20	19	(Finland) Heikki Kovalainen	Lotus-Cosworth	1:24.120			19
21	18	(Italy) Jarno Trulli	Lotus-Cosworth	1:24.199			20
22	25	(Brazil) Lucas di Grassi	Virgin-Cosworth	1:25.118			21
23	21	(Brazil) Bruno Senna	HRT-Cosworth	1:26.391			22
24	20	(Japan) Sakon Yamamoto	HRT-Cosworth	1:26.453			24

1. – Kamui Kobayashi was given a five-place grid penalty for going through a red light in the pitlane at the end of Q1.

=== Race ===
Pos	No	Driver	Constructor	Laps	Time/Retired	Grid	Points
1	6	(Australia) Mark Webber	Red Bull-Renault	70	1:41:05.571	2	25
2	8	(Spain) Fernando Alonso	Ferrari	70	+17.821	3	18
3	5	(Germany) Sebastian Vettel	Red Bull-Renault	70	+19.252	1	15
4	7	(Brazil) Felipe Massa	Ferrari	70	+27.474	4	12
5	12	(Russia) Vitaly Petrov	Renault	70	+1:13.192	7	10
6	10	(Germany) Nico Hülkenberg	Williams-Cosworth	70	+1:16.723	10	8
7	22	(Spain) Pedro de la Rosa	BMW Sauber-Ferrari	69	+1 Lap	9	6
8	1	(United Kingdom) Jenson Button	McLaren-Mercedes	69	+1 Lap	11	4
9	23	(Japan) Kamui Kobayashi	BMW Sauber-Ferrari	69	+1 Lap	23	2
10	9	(Brazil) Rubens Barrichello	Williams-Cosworth	69	+1 Lap	12	1
11	3	(Germany) Michael Schumacher^{1}	Mercedes	69	+1 Lap	14	
12	16	(Switzerland) Sébastien Buemi	Toro Rosso-Ferrari	69	+1 Lap	15	
13	15	(Italy) Vitantonio Liuzzi	Force India-Mercedes	69	+1 Lap	16	
14	19	(Finland) Heikki Kovalainen	Lotus-Cosworth	67	+3 Laps	19	
15	18	(Italy) Jarno Trulli	Lotus-Cosworth	67	+3 Laps	20	
16	24	(Germany) Timo Glock	Virgin-Cosworth	67	+3 Laps	18	
17	21	(Brazil) Bruno Senna	HRT-Cosworth	67	+3 Laps	22	
18	25	(Brazil) Lucas di Grassi	Virgin-Cosworth	66	+4 Laps	21	
19	20	(Japan) Sakon Yamamoto	HRT-Cosworth	66	+4 Laps	24	
Ret	2	(United Kingdom) Lewis Hamilton	McLaren-Mercedes	23	Gearbox	5	
Ret	11	(Poland) Robert Kubica	Renault	23	Collision damage	8	
Ret	4	(Germany) Nico Rosberg	Mercedes	15	Wheel	6	
Ret	14	(Germany) Adrian Sutil	Force India-Mercedes	15	Collision	13	
Ret	17	(Spain) Jaime Alguersuari	Toro Rosso-Ferrari	1	Engine	17	

Notes:

1. An incident between Michael Schumacher and Rubens Barrichello coming down the pit straight, where Schumacher nearly forced Barrichello into the pit wall while he was attempting an overtake was investigated by the stewards after the race. The stewards then came to a decision by handing Schumacher a 10-place grid penalty at the next race.

== Championship standings after the race ==
Drivers' Championship standings

	Pos.	Driver	Points
2	1	(Australia) Mark Webber	161
1	2	(United Kingdom) Lewis Hamilton	157
1	3	(Germany) Sebastian Vettel	151
2	4	(United Kingdom) Jenson Button	147
	5	(Spain) Fernando Alonso	141

Constructors' Championship standings

	Pos.	Constructor	Points
1	1	(Austria) Red Bull-Renault	312
1	2	(United Kingdom) McLaren-Mercedes	304
	3	(Italy) Ferrari	238
	4	(Germany) Mercedes	132
	5	(France) Renault	106

- Note: Only the top five positions are included for both sets of standings.

== See also ==
- 2010 Hungaroring GP2 Series round
- 2010 Hungaroring GP3 Series round

Previous race: 2010 German Grand Prix	FIA Formula One World Championship; 2010 season	Next race: 2010 Belgian Grand Prix
Previous race: 2009 Hungarian Grand Prix	Hungarian Grand Prix	Next race: 2011 Hungarian Grand Prix
