= 2010 Japanese Grand Prix =

Race 16 of 19 in the 2010 Formula One World Championship
← Previous race	Next race →

Race details
- Date: 10 October 2010
- Official name: 2010 Formula 1 Japanese Grand Prix
- Location: Suzuka Circuit, Suzuka, Mie
- Course: Permanent racing facility
- Course length: 5.807 km (3.608 miles)
- Distance: 53 laps, 307.471 (Note: There is a 0.300 km (0.186 mi) offset between the start and finish lines.) km (191.054 miles)
- Weather: Sunny
- Attendance: 190,000

Pole position
Driver	(Germany) Sebastian Vettel	Red Bull-Renault
- Time: 1:30.785

Fastest lap
Driver	(Australia) Mark Webber	Red Bull-Renault
- Time: 1:33.474 on lap 53

Podium
First	(Germany) Sebastian Vettel	Red Bull-Renault
Second	(Australia) Mark Webber	Red Bull-Renault
Third	(Spain) Fernando Alonso	Ferrari

The 2010 Japanese Grand Prix (officially the 2010 Formula 1 Japanese Grand Prix) was a Formula One motor race held on 10 October 2010 at the Suzuka Circuit, Suzuka, Mie, Japan before 190,000 spectators. It was the 16th round of the 2010 Formula One World Championship and the 26th Japanese Grand Prix held as part of the Formula One World Championship. Red Bull driver Sebastian Vettel won the 53-lap race from pole position. His team-mate Mark Webber finished second and Fernando Alonso was third in a Ferrari.

Entering the race, Webber led Alonso in the World Drivers' Championship by 11 championship points. Webber's team Red Bull led second-placed McLaren by 24 championship points in the World Constructors' Championship. Vettel claimed the 13th pole position of his career by setting qualifying's fastest lap which was delayed to the day of the race due to torrential rain. Vettel held the lead for the first 24 laps until he made his only pit stop, promoting Webber to first for one lap. Jenson Button of McLaren led the following 13 laps before Vettel retook the position on the 39th lap, maintaining it for the rest of the race to achieve his third victory of the season and the eighth of his career. The safety car was deployed once for two separate accidents on the first lap involving Vitaly Petrov and Nico Hülkenberg as well as Felipe Massa and Vitantonio Liuzzi.

As a consequence of the final result, Webber extended his lead over Alonso by three championship points in the World Drivers' Championship. Vettel's victory promoted him from fourth to third and he had the same number of championship points as Alonso. Hamilton was demoted to fourth as a result of his finishing fifth, and his teammate Button remained in fifth. In the World Constructors' Championship, Red Bull further increased their lead over McLaren to 45 championship points, with three races remaining in the season.

== Background ==
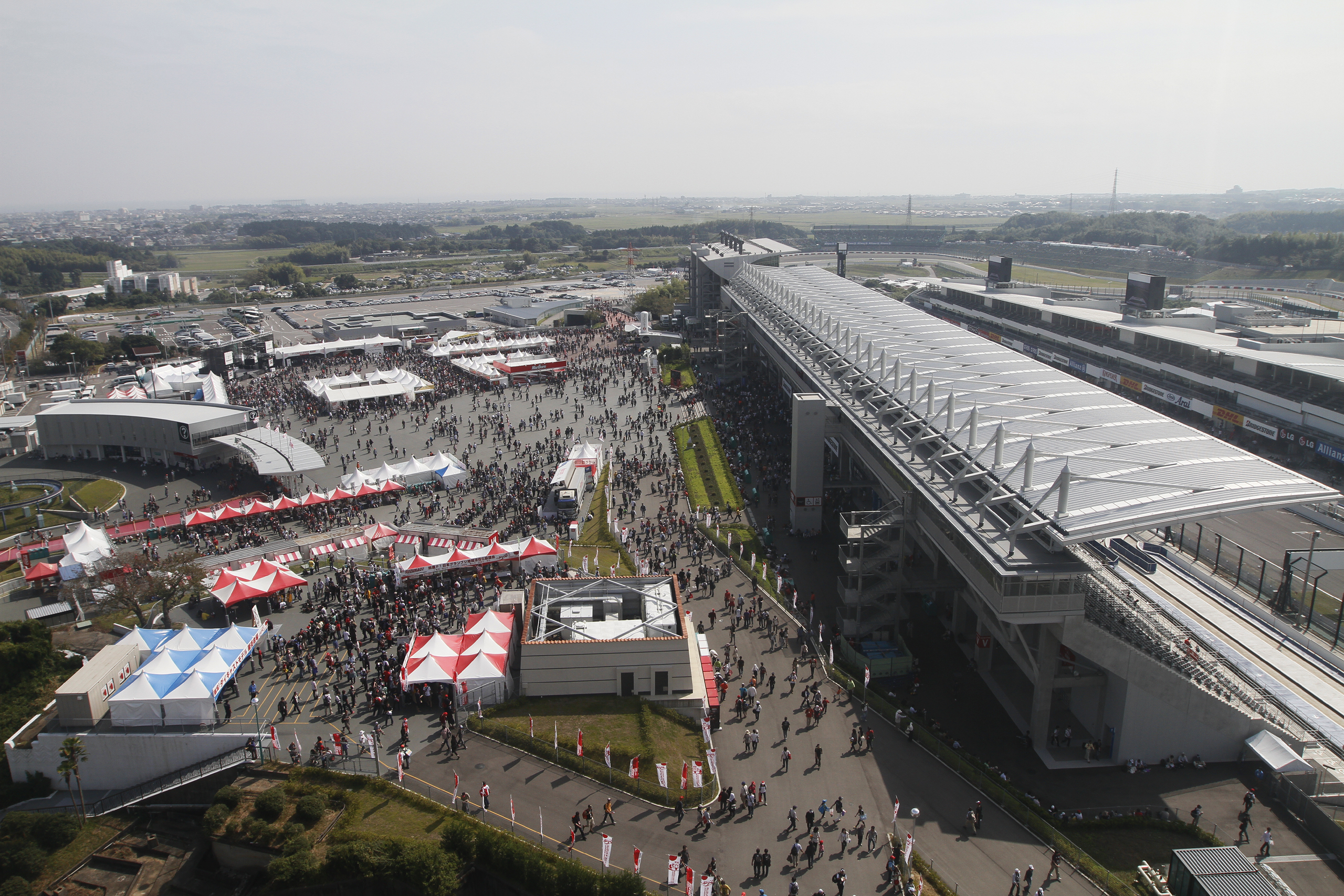
The Suzuka Circuit, where the race was held

The 2010 Japanese Grand Prix was the 16th of 19 single seater motor races of the 2010 Formula One World Championship, and the 26th running of the event as part of the Formula One World Championship. It was held at the 18-turn 5.807 km (3.608 mi) clockwise Suzuka Circuit in Suzuka, Mie on 10 October. Tyre supplier Bridgestone provided four types of tyres to the race; two dry compounds (soft green-banded "options" and hard "primes") and wet-weather compounds (intermediate and full wet green-line central groove banded tyre).

For the 2010 race, a 25 mm (0.98 in) kerb was installed in place of an existing kerb and green concrete sections at the exits to the Denger 1 and Spoon corners were each elongated by 20 m (66 ft). Two layers of artificial grass laid on the outside of the Spoon corner was extended with another layer of artificial grass laid behind the kerbing to the exit of the Casio Triangle chicane, extending its overall length by more than 20 m (66 ft). Conveyor belts were retrofitted to the front of tyre walls that had previously lacked them.

Pre-race, Red Bull driver Mark Webber led the World Drivers' Championship with 202 championship points; ahead of the second-placed Fernando Alonso of Ferrari with 191 championship points. McLaren's Lewis Hamilton held third with 182 championship points, Webber's teammate Sebastian Vettel was fourth with 181 championship points and Hamilton's teammate Jenson Button placed fifth with 177 championship points. Red Bull led the World Constructors' Championship with 383 championship points; McLaren and Ferrari were second and third with 359 and 319 championship points, respectively. With 168 championship points, Mercedes in fourth had 35 more championship points than Renault in fifth.

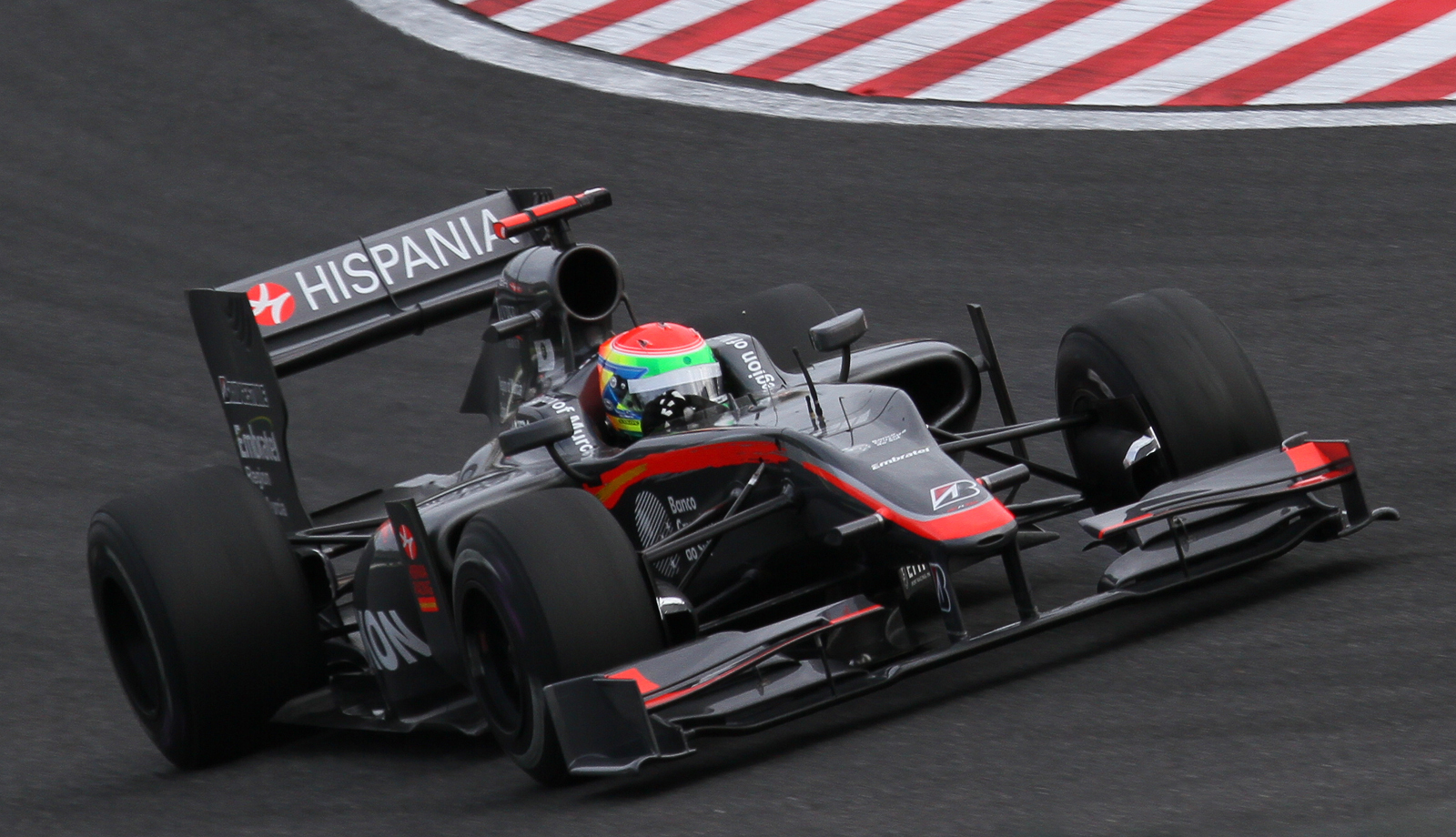
Sakon Yamamoto returned to Hispania Racing for the Grand Prix in place of Christian Klien.

Alonso had won the preceding Italian and Singapore Grand Prix to be eleven championship points behind Webber and said the season's final four rounds would challenge him mentally believing a top-three result and figuring his championship position in Abu Dhabi was vital. Webber admitted Ferrari's recent form had given them momentum but felt Red Bull would be competitive in Japan, saying they needed to extract performance. His teammate Vettel said he felt he could win the title and noted the importance of finishing races and driver optimisation. He acknowledged Red Bull's car was suited to the Suzuka Circuit and said his focus would be on the Japanese round. Hamilton, who was intrigued to learn he remained in the championship battle after failing to finish the previous two Grands Prix, sought a victory duel in Japan and hoped for a marked improvement. His teammate Button said he acknowledged a potential championship win even though he was 25 championship points behind Webber and felt the Suzuka Circuit where he had not achieved a race victory suited his driving style.

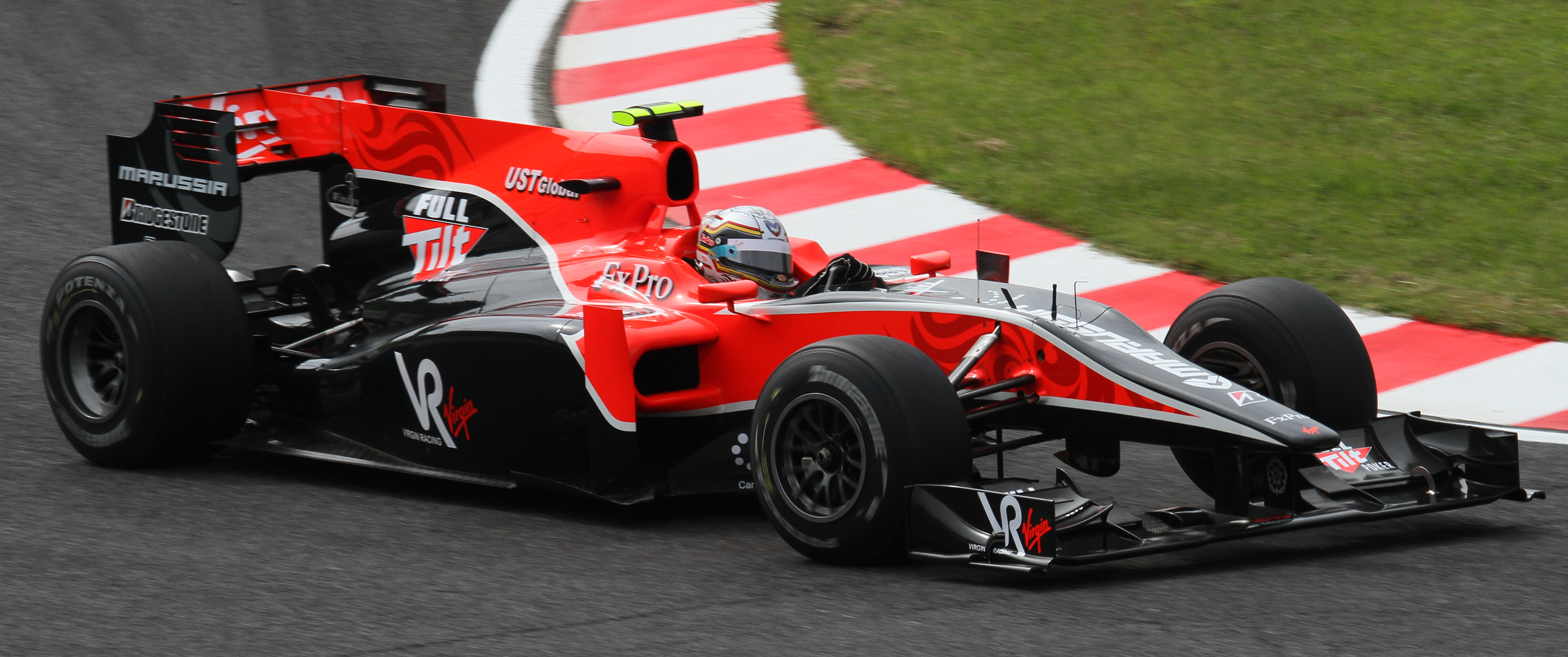
Jérôme d'Ambrosio replaced Lucas di Grassi at Virgin Racing for the second first free practice session in a row

Some teams modified their cars for the Grand Prix. Adrian Newey, Red Bull's technical director, moved the RB6's front brake calipers backwards to a vertical position to prevent mechanical failures associated with the brake discs, pads and pistons moving more. Both Vettel and Webber had two separate diffusers and rear wing specialisations and a revised rear wing featuring a delta shaped beam wing in the centre. Ferrari modified the F10's diffuser to include a small omega shaped wing on the deformable structure's top to bring about a slight increase in downforce. McLaren introduced a revised aerodynamic package featuring a new front wing, lengthened exhausts, a new engine cover and rear wing with angled gills. The squad chose to use the standard version for qualifying and the race.

A total of 12 constructors and 24 drivers participated with one driver change and a single free practice entrant. Having driven one of its cars at the preceding Singapore Grand Prix, local driver Sakon Yamamoto replaced Christian Klien as partner for Bruno Senna at Hispania Racing. Lucas di Grassi was replaced for the second successive first free practice session by GP2 Series driver Jérôme d'Ambrosio at Virgin Racing to allow the latter to undergo evaluation as a driver. Paul di Resta did not partake in the first practice session for the Force India team for the second successive Grand Prix, to allow the team's regular drivers Vitantonio Liuzzi and Adrian Sutil to test new car aerodynamic updates.

== Practice ==
There were three practice sessions held in accordance with the 2010 regulations: two 90-minute sessions on Friday morning and afternoon and one 60-minute session on Saturday morning. In the first practice session, held in dry weather, Vettel lapped fastest at 1:32.585 which he set approximately halfway through the session. His teammate Webber was 0.048 seconds slower in second and Renault's Robert Kubica was third. Sutil, Hamilton, the Williams duo of Rubens Barrichello and Nico Hülkenberg, Mercedes' Michael Schumacher, Sauber's Nick Heidfeld and Schumacher's teammate Nico Rosberg followed in the top ten. Halfway through the session, Hamilton lost control of his car when it bottomed out and went wide into the quick downhill double right-hand Denger corner, damaging the car's front-left corner in a major collision with the tyre wall. His car was transported back to the pit lane by tractor and therefore took no further part in the session. With three minutes remaining, Hamilton's teammate Button ran over the kerbs at Denger One turn but regained control of his car and avoided the barrier by stopping in the gravel.

Vettel was the early pace setter in the second practice session with a 1:32.210 lap time recorded on 20 minutes on hard compound tyres before Webber's lap of 1:31.860, also set on hard compound tyres, led overall after an hour. After changing to the soft compound tyres, Vettel set the overall fastest lap of 1:31.465 with 20 minutes remaining. Webber, Kubica, Alonso, Ferrari's Felipe Massa, Button, Renault's Vitaly Petrov, Schumacher, Sutil and Hülkenberg made up second through tenth. During the session, Schumacher ran wide on the kerb between both of the apexes at Denger turn but did not hit the wall. Hamilton was required to miss most of the session as his team's mechanics reconstructed his vehicle after his first practice session accident. He partook in the final eight minutes and set seven laps to be 13th quickest.

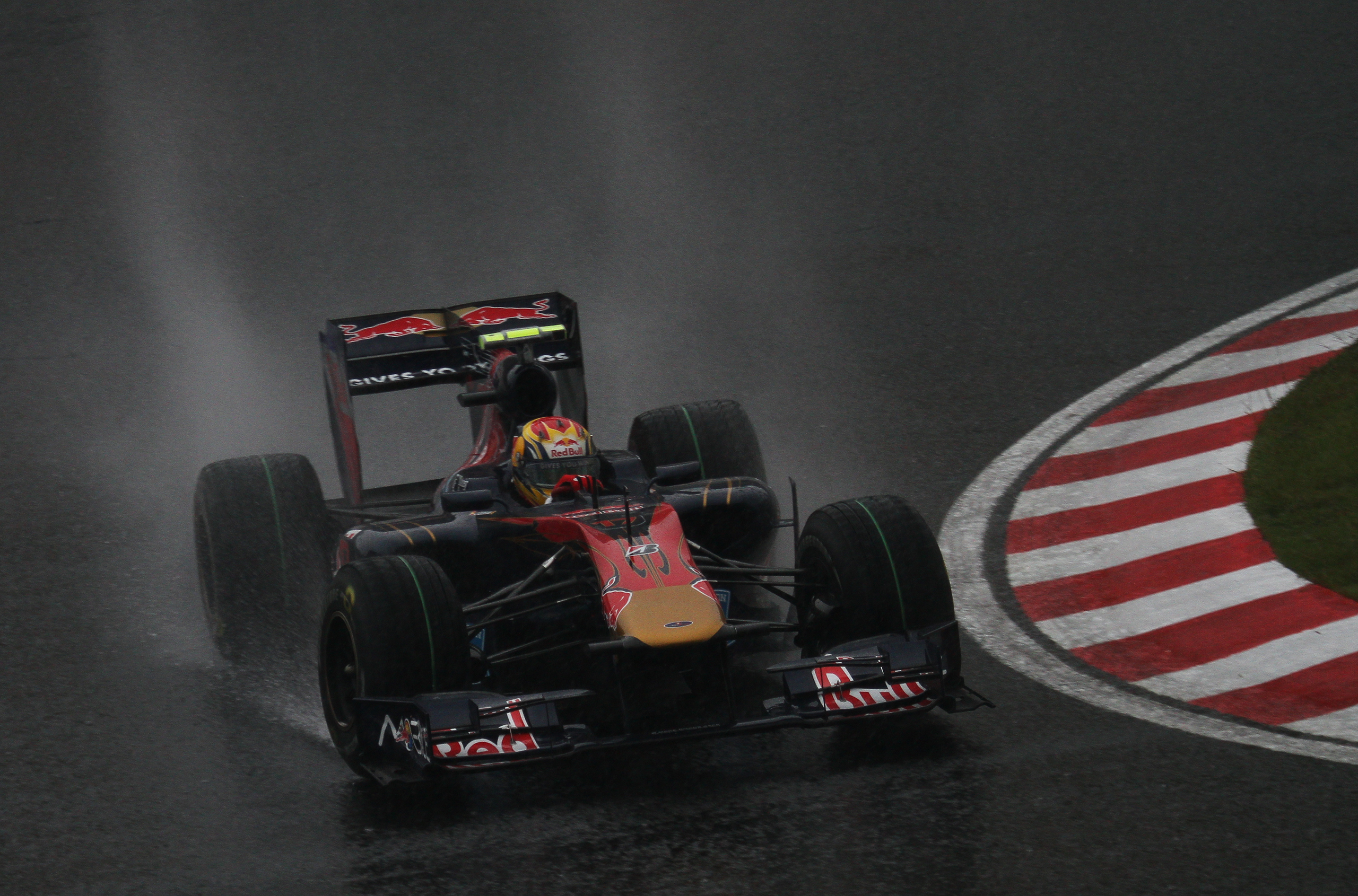
Jaime Alguersuari driving for Toro Rosso during the rain-affected third practice session

Wet weather arrived at the circuit early in the morning of 9 October; the rain got heavier before the final practice session began and worsened throughout the session, causing low visibility. The safety car was used to assess the track conditions prior to the session's commencement. Due to rivers running across multiple turns and puddles causing aquaplaning, teams were reluctant to send drivers onto the circuit and two competitors set lap times. Toro Rosso's Jaime Alguersuari lapped fastest at 1:55.902, followed by Virgin Racing's Timo Glock. Several participants opted for wet-weather tyres for one exploratory lap before re-entering the pit lane. Hamilton reported the conditions made the track undriveable, and Mercedes team principal Ross Brawn said he would be disappointed if qualifying was staged in such weather and suggested the starting order be determined by either holding qualifying on Sunday morning or by championship standings.

== Qualifying ==
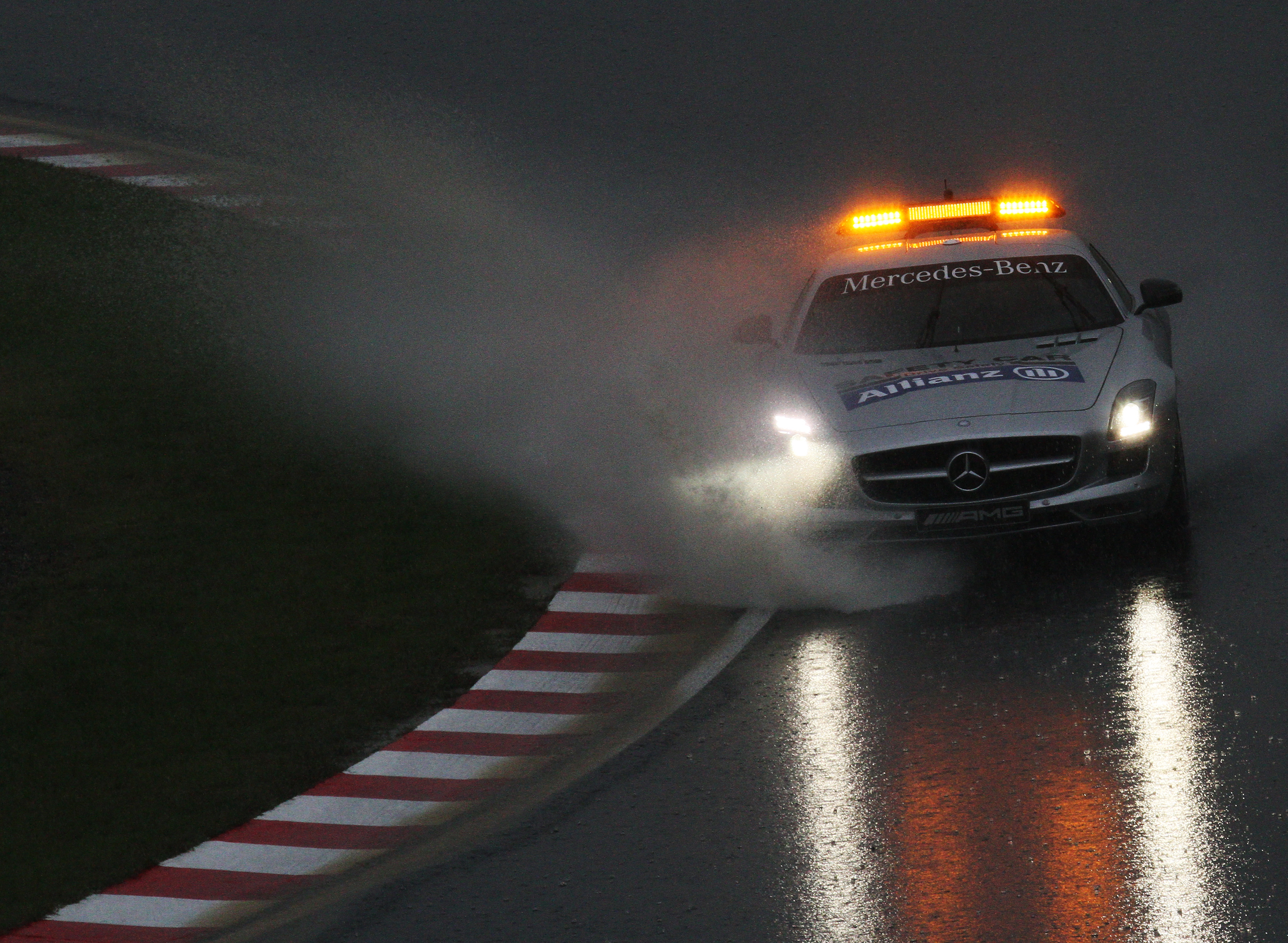
The safety car was used to evaluate the weather conditions during the postponed qualifying session on Saturday.

Inclement weather continued to disrupt the Saturday's proceedings as qualifying was delayed three times every half an hour while the safety car was deployed several times to assess the conditions before being ultimately rescheduled for Sunday morning by the Fédération Internationale de l'Automobile (FIA)'s race director Charlie Whiting on safety grounds arising from fading light levels. (Note: Qualifying for the 2004 Japanese Grand Prix was also delayed to the day of the race due to forecasts of Typhoon Ma-on making landfall on the circuit.) Many figures in Formula One agreed with the decision to postpone qualifying, with drivers such as Button, Hamilton, Schumacher and Vettel noting that they would not be able to control their vehicles in torrential rain had the session be run. Williams technical director Sam Michael proposed the re-introduction of slower monsoon tyres to enable drivers to drive in severe weather. Local driver Kamui Kobayashi for Sauber said he felt sorry for attendees seated in the grandstands not witnessing any action.

The qualifying session was split into three parts. The first session ran for 20 minutes, eliminating cars that finished 18th or lower. The second session was 15 minutes long, eliminating cars that finished 11th to 17th. The final ten-minute session determined pole position to tenth. Cars in the final session were not allowed to change tyres before the start of the race, using the set with which they set their quickest lap times. All vehicles were not required to enter parc fermé conditions with the FIA conducting surveillance via CCTV cameras installed in every garage. Therefore, teams were allowed to adjust their cars until qualifying was over. (Note: Parc fermé is a secure and enclosed area in a motor racing paddock where FIA scrutineers check that all cars are legal and where teams can make a limited amount of alteration to their vehicles.) Clear and sunny weather allowed qualifying to commence at the new start time of 10:00.

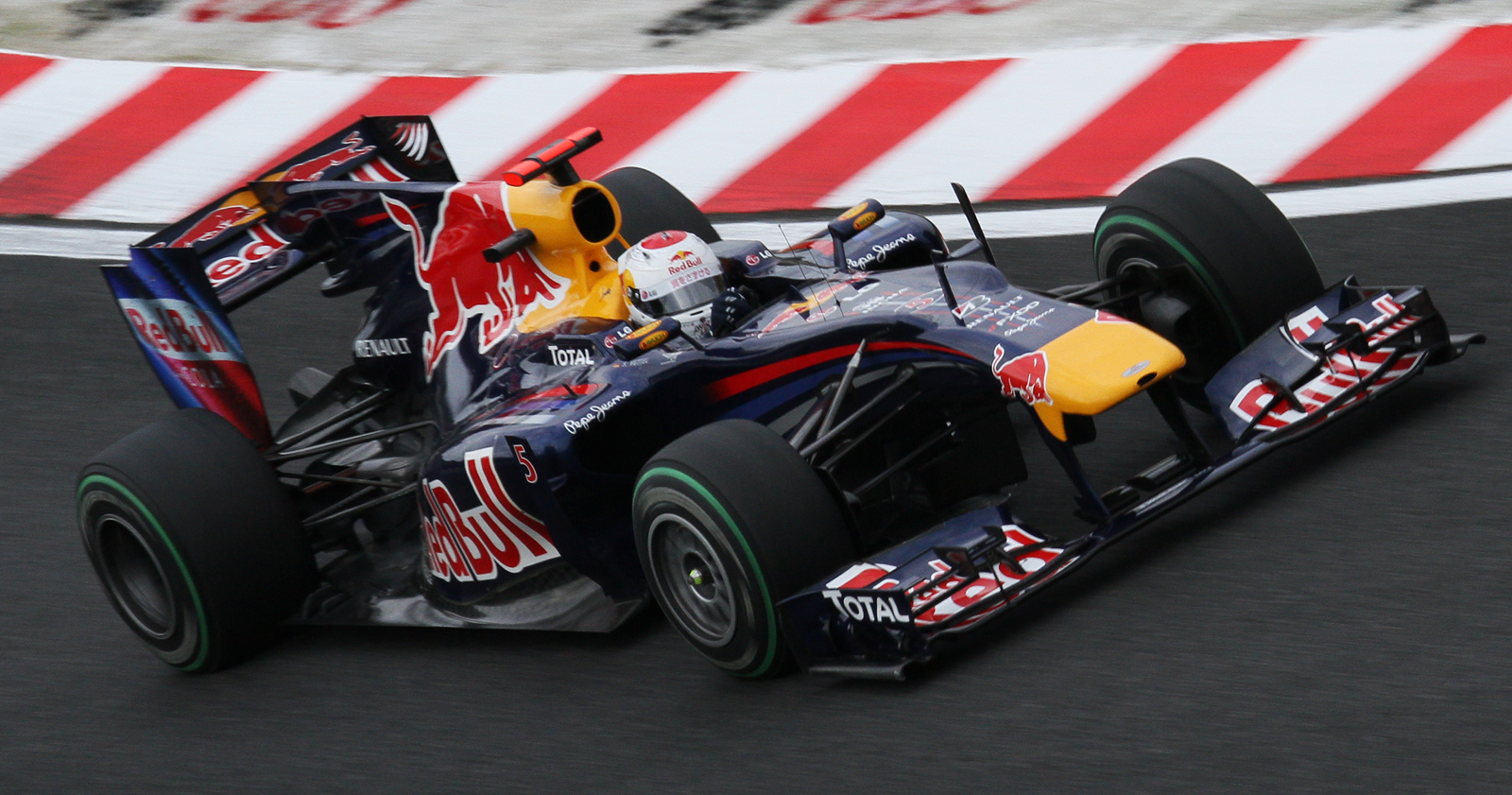
Sebastian Vettel qualified on pole position for the 13th time in his career

Vettel took his eighth pole position of the season and the 13th of his career. He set a lap of 1:30.792 that he subsequently improved by seven-thousandths of a second by not slowing through the first corner. Vettel was joined on the grid's front row by Webber who was 0.078 seconds slower than his teammate after losing time in the final third of the lap. Hamilton qualified in provisional third place by being faster than both Red Bull drivers for 2/3 of the lap. Kubica took fourth in a car setup for maximum speed in a straight line. He demoted Alonso to fifth who was fastest overall in the middle of the lap but slower elsewhere. Button felt better driving on the hard compound tyres and had more fuel in his car than his teammate Hamilton to set the sixth-fastest qualifying time on his final timed effort. Rosberg felt his car was balanced and was seventh with the Williams duo of Barrichello and Hülkenberg (who complained he was blocked by Hamilton on his last timed lap into the chicane) eighth and ninth. Schumacher took tenth due to an improperly working F-duct system.

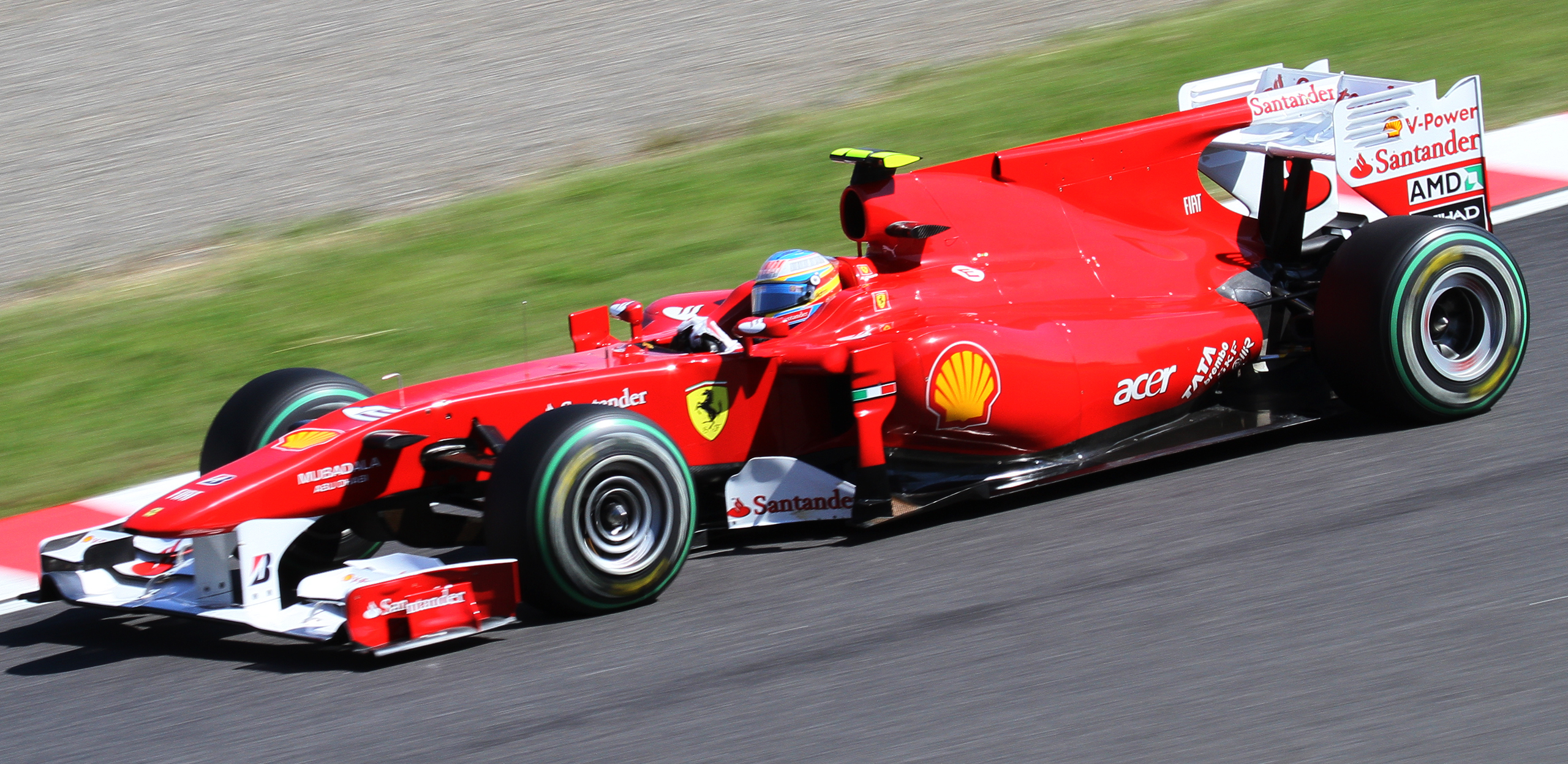
Championship contender Fernando Alonso started from fifth position

Heidfeld in 11th used the soft compound tyres but was the fastest driver not to qualify in the top ten since Schumacher's final lap in the second session prevented him from advancing to the final session. 12th-placed Massa could not qualify higher due to slower cars impeding him and causing him to make an error at Casio Triangle turn during his first timed lap. Petrov in 13th was 1.2 seconds slower than teammate Kubica, with Kobayashi looking set to advance to the final session before a minor error at Casio Triangle corner left him 14th. Sutil, 15th, reported he could not generate tyre temperature, and Alguersuari used a different car mechanical balance to claim 16th and qualify higher than his teammate Sébastien Buemi for the fourth time in the previous six Grands Prix. Liuzzi was 17th and half a second slower than teammate Sutil. Buemi failed to qualify past the first session due to a mechanical fault with his car's floor and his being slowed in the first third of the lap. The two Lotus cars of Jarno Trulli and Heikki Kovalainen were 19th and 20th. Di Grassi in 21st qualified higher than Virgin Racing teammate Glock for the second time in 2010 in 22nd after the latter was dissatisfied with his car's setup. The Hispania Racing duo of Senna and Yamamoto completed the starting lineup in 23rd and 24th.

=== Post-qualifying ===
After qualifying, Hamilton was demoted five starting places because McLaren opted to change the gearbox he had used in Singapore for a new one after detecting worsening abnormal gearbox oil pressure in his vehicle during the third practice session; the problem could not be rectified before qualifying. This demoted Hamilton from third to eighth. The Williams team filed a protest with the FIA stewards for Hamilton's perceived blocking of Hülkenberg in the final qualifying session. The stewards did not find any evidence that Hamilton violated the regulations and thus did not penalise him.

=== Qualifying classification ===
The fastest lap in each of the three sessions is denoted in bold.

Pos	No.	Driver	Constructor	Q1	Q2	Q3	Grid
1	5	(Germany) Sebastian Vettel	Red Bull-Renault	**1:32.035**	**1:31.184**	**1:30.785**	1
2	6	(Australia) Mark Webber	Red Bull-Renault	1:32.476	1:31.241	1:30.853	2
3	2	(United Kingdom) Lewis Hamilton	McLaren-Mercedes	1:32.809	1:31.523	1:31.169	8^{1}
4	11	(Poland) Robert Kubica	Renault	1:32.808	1:32.042	1:31.231	3
5	8	(Spain) Fernando Alonso	Ferrari	1:32.555	1:31.819	1:31.352	4
6	1	(United Kingdom) Jenson Button	McLaren-Mercedes	1:32.636	1:31.763	1:31.378	5
7	4	(Germany) Nico Rosberg	Mercedes	1:32.238	1:31.886	1:31.494	6
8	9	(Brazil) Rubens Barrichello	Williams-Cosworth	1:32.361	1:31.874	1:31.535	7
9	10	(Germany) Nico Hülkenberg	Williams-Cosworth	1:32.211	1:31.926	1:31.559	9
10	3	(Germany) Michael Schumacher	Mercedes	1:32.513	1:32.073	1:31.846	10
11	22	(Germany) Nick Heidfeld	BMW Sauber-Ferrari	1:33.011	1:32.187	N/A	11
12	7	(Brazil) Felipe Massa	Ferrari	1:32.721	1:32.321	N/A	12
13	12	(Russia) Vitaly Petrov	Renault	1:32.849	1:32.422	N/A	13
14	23	(Japan) Kamui Kobayashi	BMW Sauber-Ferrari	1:32.783	1:32.427	N/A	14
15	14	(Germany) Adrian Sutil	Force India-Mercedes	1:33.186	1:32.659	N/A	15
16	17	(Spain) Jaime Alguersuari	Toro Rosso-Ferrari	1:33.471	1:33.071	N/A	16
17	15	(Italy) Vitantonio Liuzzi	Force India-Mercedes	1:33.216	1:33.154	N/A	17
18	16	(Switzerland) Sébastien Buemi	Toro Rosso-Ferrari	1:33.568	N/A	N/A	18
19	18	(Italy) Jarno Trulli	Lotus-Cosworth	1:35.346	N/A	N/A	19
20	19	(Finland) Heikki Kovalainen	Lotus-Cosworth	1:35.464	N/A	N/A	20
21	25	(Brazil) Lucas di Grassi	Virgin-Cosworth	1:36.265	N/A	N/A	21
22	24	(Germany) Timo Glock	Virgin-Cosworth	1:36.332	N/A	N/A	22
23	21	(Brazil) Bruno Senna	HRT-Cosworth	1:37.270	N/A	N/A	23
24	20	(Japan) Sakon Yamamoto	HRT-Cosworth	1:37.365	N/A	N/A	24

Note:

- **^1** – Lewis Hamilton served a five-place grid penalty for switching his gearbox as a result of abnormal oil pressure.

== Race ==
The 53-lap, 307.471 km (191.054 mi) race started at 15:00 local time, attended by 190,000 spectators. The weather conditions at the start were sunny, with the ambient temperature between 25 and 27 °C (77 and 81 °F) and the track temperature from 32 to 36 °C (90 to 97 °F); weather forecasts suggested no rainfall during the event. A total of 24 drivers were due to take the start but Di Grassi, on his formation lap, went wide off the track onto the artificial grass at the exit of 130R corner, possibly due to him driving onto some moisture on the outside kerb. The resulting impact against the tyre barrier destroyed his car. Di Grassi was unhurt but he did not start and his car was removed from the circuit by crane and marshals cleared the crash scene. Every driver in the top ten, except for Button, began on the soft compound tyre. Amateur footage observed Vettel almost jumping the start before the event commenced.

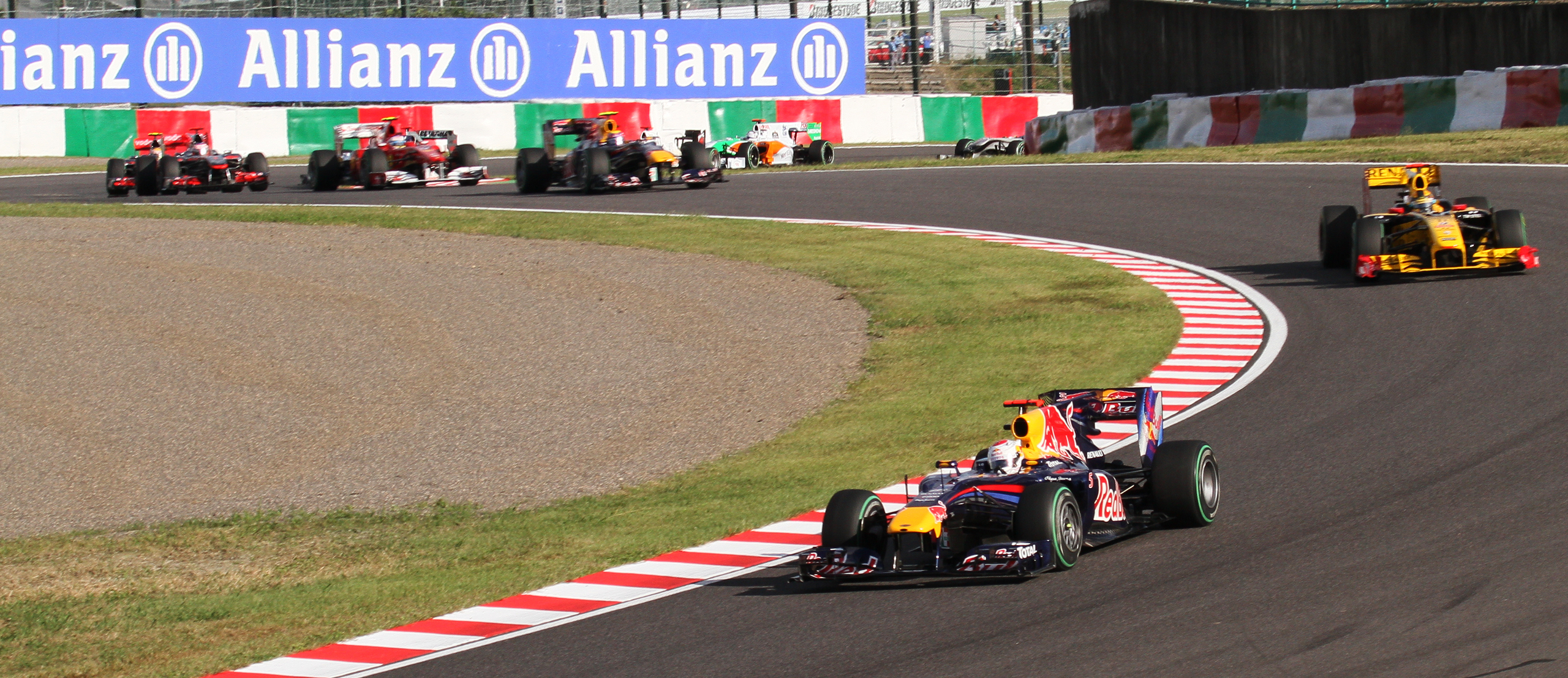
Vettel leading the field on the first lap of the race

When the five red lights went out to begin the Grand Prix, Vettel made a brisk getaway to maintain the lead into the first corner. Behind him, Kubica overtook Webber for second, but he could not challenge Vettel for first into the first turn. Two separate accidents occurring further down the order promoted the safety car's deployment. Petrov made a brisk start but came across the front of Hülkenberg and collided with the corner of the latter's car while trying to pass him. Petrov speared left into the outside barriers on the main straight and crashed as Hülkenberg retired with damaged front suspension. Massa was given less room trying to pass the slow-starting Rosberg and had to drive onto the grass on the track's inside. This caused him to lose control of his car and hit the side of Liuzzi's vehicle. Liuzzi and Massa were unhurt. During the safety car period, Rosberg, Trulli, Glock and Senna made pit stops for the hard compound tyres. Drivers on the soft tyres had an advantage since the safety car's slower speed meant the tyres would have longer optimal performance. On the third lap, Kubica retired when his right-rear wheel detached into the hairpin due to insufficient torque on the wheel nut loosened by incorrect wheel gun settings.

The safety car was withdrawn at the conclusion of the sixth lap and racing resumed with Vettel leading his teammate Webber, and Alonso. On lap seven, Rosberg attempted to pass Buemi on the outside into 130R corner but ran wide onto the damp artificial grass and returned to 13th place. His teammate Schumacher overtook Barrichello's hard-to-handle car at the final chicane with some minor contact for sixth position and maintained the place into the first corner. At the conclusion of the lap, Vettel led Webber by nine-tenths of a second, which he extended to two seconds by the 13th lap's start. On the same lap, Kobayashi overtook Alguersuari on the inside for tenth into the hairpin as the two drivers made slight contact. Barrichello in seventh was delaying Heidfeld, Sutil and Algersuari. Sutil went off the circuit at the final corner on lap 16 but remained in ninth. Two laps later, Kobayashi overtook Sutil on the inside for ninth into the hairpin. Sutil drew alongside Kobayashi into Spoon corner but could not retake ninth by passing Kobayashi.

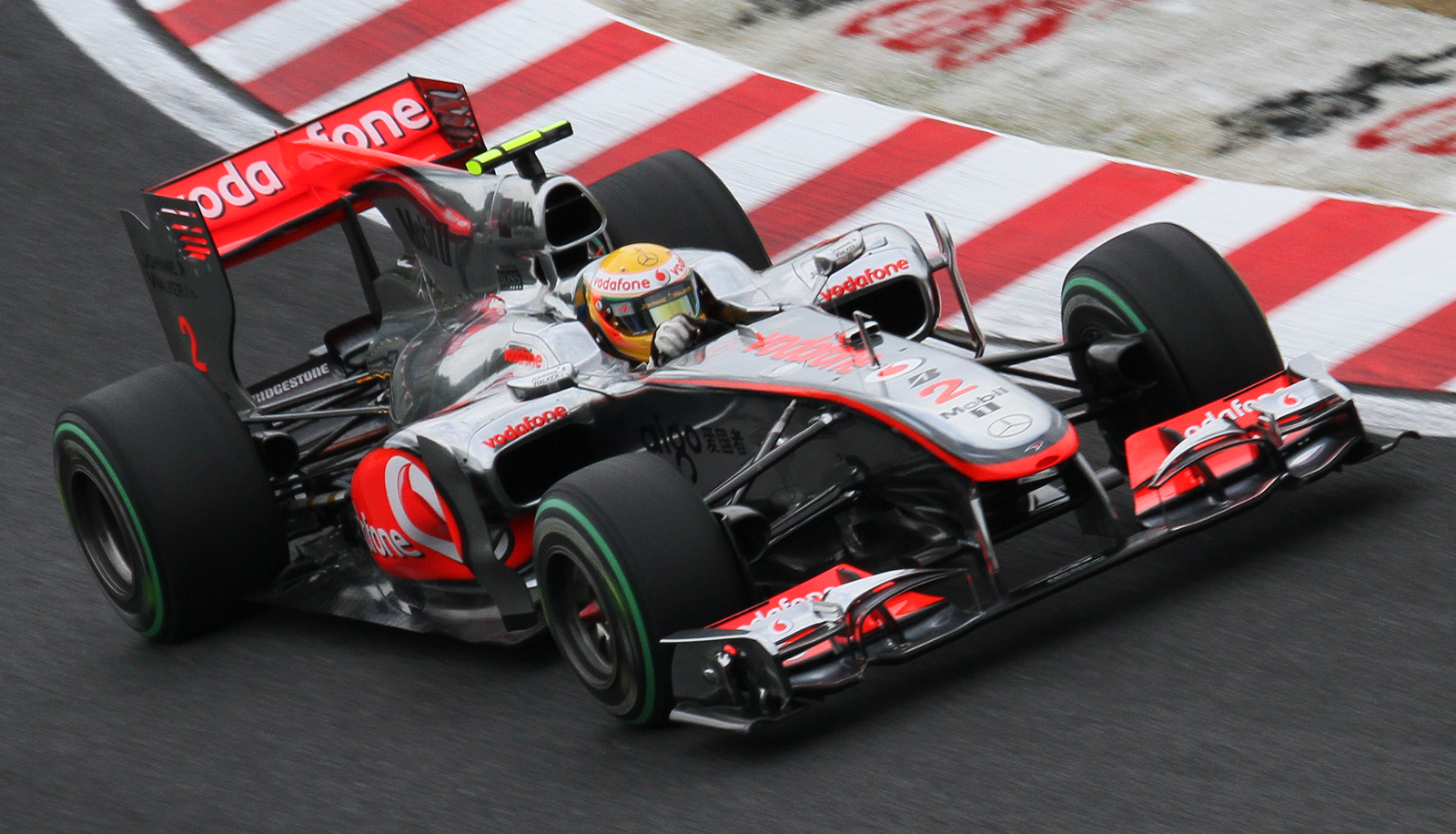
Lewis Hamilton came fifth behind his McLaren teammate Jenson Button

Pit stops began on lap 19 when Sutil and Heidfeld stopped for hard compound tyres. Newer hard compound tyres were quicker than worn soft tyres dictating the first driver to make a pit stop would gain a significant advantage. While Sutil went fastest overall in the second half of the lap, suggesting newer hard compound tyres had more performance, no leading drivers decided to do pit stops. This was due to there being half the race left and both Red Bull cars were eight seconds ahead of Alonso and could remain on track to react to any of Ferrari's actions. Williams reacted to Heidfeld's stop and called Barrichello into the pit lane from seventh for the hard compound tyres on the 21st lap. Barrichello's slower pace left him behind Heidfeld in 12th. This unhindered Kobayashi who required 20 seconds over Sutil but the latter's pace and the former being slowed produced a 17-second gap. Hamilton made a pit stop for the hard compound tyres on lap 23 and fell to seventh behind Kobayashi. This forced Hamilton not to use the additional grip provided by his tyres immediately.

On lap 24, Schumacher made a pit stop for the hard compound tyres from fifth. He rejoined the track behind his teammate Rosberg in ninth, allowing Red Bull to conduct their own pit stops at a convenient time for them. On lap 25, Vettel and Alonso made their pit stops from first and third, emerging in third and fourth respectively with Webber taking over the lead. Hamilton slipstreamed Kobayashi on the main straight and overtook him on the inside into the first turn for sixth on that lap. On lap 27, Rosberg blocked an overtake by his faster teammate Schumacher entering the Casio Triangle chicane and again into the first turn by putting Schumacher onto the outside. As a consequence of his strategy allowing him to drive on the same set of tyres for longer on the circuit, Button was now leading and had to pull away from Alonso and Hamilton to remain ahead of both drivers following his pit stop. The Red Bull duo were informed of the possibility of Button not making his pit stop until the final lap in order to slow them and put them under pressure from Alonso and Hamilton. Button was not able to set the lap times to achieve the distance needed due to track evolution.

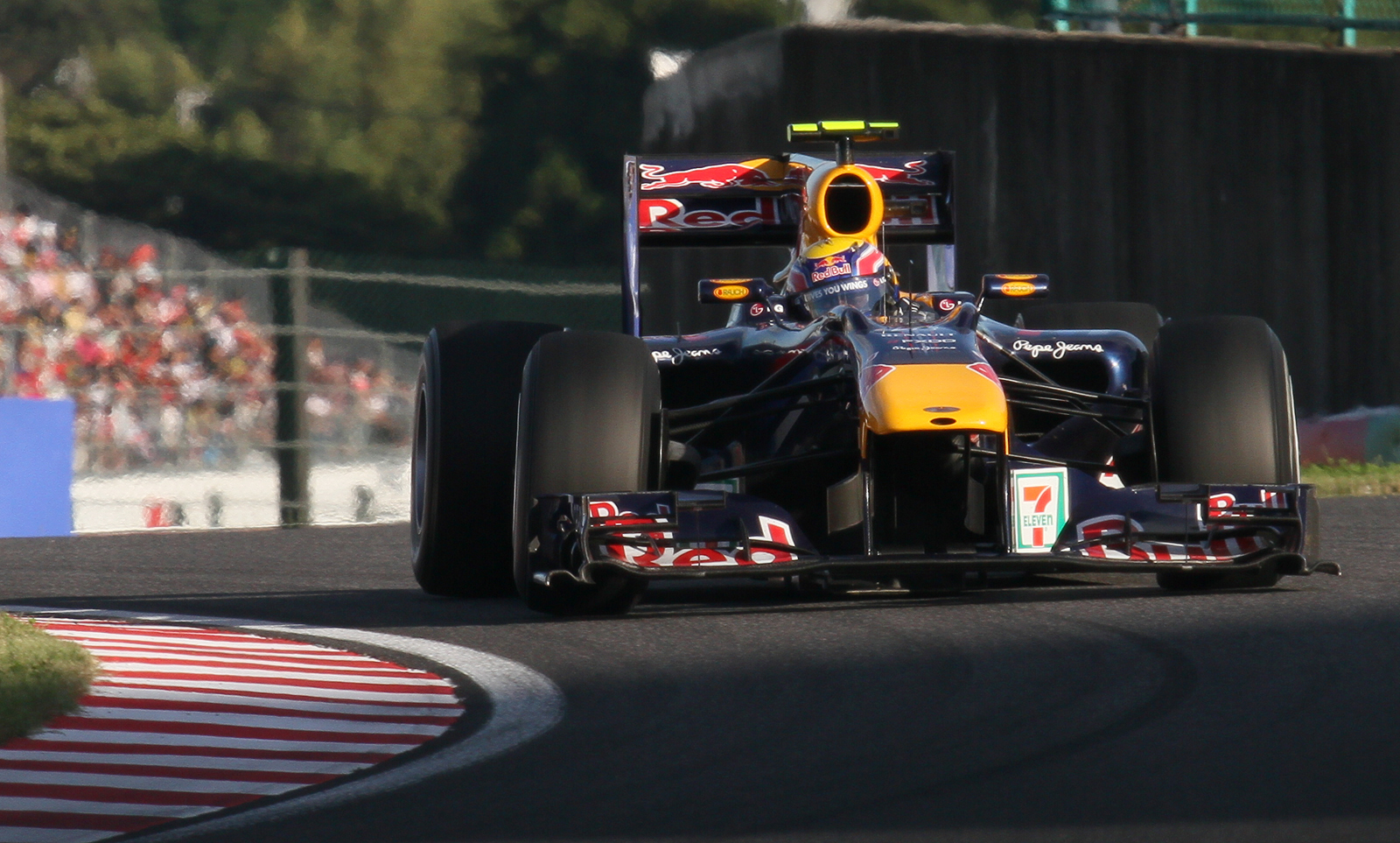
Mark Webber finished second to increase his lead in the World Drivers' Championship.

At the conclusion of the 38th lap, Button made his pit stop from the lead for the soft compound tyres. He returned to the track in fifth as Vettel retook the lead and Webber returned to second. Kobayashi made his pit stop from sixth on the same lap and rejoined the race in 12th. Hamilton radioed his team that he could not use third gear due to a possible dog-ring breakage; he had to rely on fourth gear to finish the race. This allowed Hamilton's teammate Button on soft tyres to close up and pass him at the hairpin for fourth on the 44th lap when Hamilton went wide at the corner. On the following lap, Kobayashi overtook Algersuari on the outside into the hairpin with aid from a slower car for eleventh. Both drivers made slight contact exiting the corner. The contact removed Kobayashi's turning vain. Sutil was close behind Barrichello in ninth when an oil pipe in his car failed into 130R turn, causing smoke to billow from his rear of his engine. He spun through 360 degrees on his car's own oil in 130R corner as it laid oil on the racing line before he retired in the pit lane. Sutil's retirement promoted Kobayashi to tenth as Alguersuari made a pit stop to repair front wing damage sustained in the collision with Kobayashi.

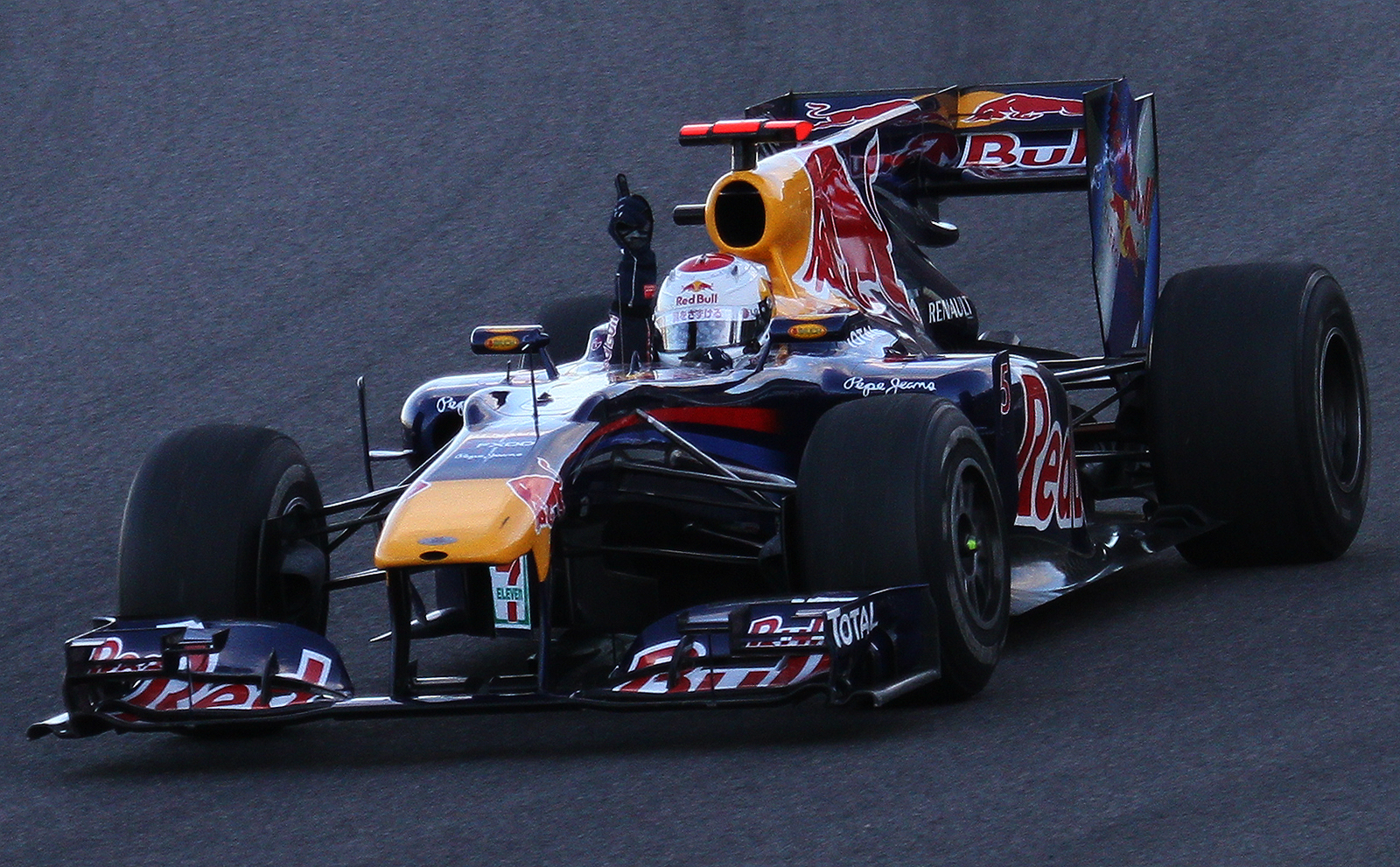
Vettel celebrating the eighth victory of his career

As Rosberg drove uphill towards the high-speed left-hand Esses on lap 48, the car's left-rear wheel detached due to a possible hub failure, causing him to strike the turn five tyre wall at approximately 210 km/h (130 mph). Rosberg was unhurt since his car remained upright. On the following lap, Kobayashi overtook Barrichello for eighth braking for the hairpin. He then passed teammate Heidfeld into the hairpin for seventh on the 50th lap. At the front, Vettel finished first to achieve his third victory of the season and the eighth of his career at an average speed of 203.948 km/h (126.727 mph). Webber followed 0.905 seconds later in second and set the race's fastest lap at 1:33.474 on the final lap. Alonso took third with McLaren's Button and Hamilton fourth and fifth. Schumacher was sixth, achieving his best result since the Turkish Grand Prix five months earlier. The last of the drivers who scored championship points were Kobayashi, Heidfeld, Barrichello and Buemi in seventh through tenth. Alguersuari, Kovalainen, Trulli made up positions 11th to 13th. Glock, 14th, held off Senna in 15th, who had brake issues preventing him from passing. Yamamoto, slowed by a drop in fuel pressure, and Rosberg were the last two classified finishers.

=== Post-race ===
The top three drivers appeared on the podium to collect their trophies and spoke to the media in a later press conference. Vettel said achieving a brisk start was key to victory and heralded "an incredible day" for his team: "It was down to the team. They have been working very hard, most of the guys they didn't sleep the Thursday until the Saturday, so it was good there was no qualifying as they didn't have to touch the car and got some sleep. I think they deserve it today." Webber commented on his delight at finishing second and noted the circuit layout stopped him from passing his teammate. He said he needed to win in the future but observed that reliability had the potential to factor in the championship duel. Alonso revealed he made a slow getaway but felt his team had to be satisfied with his coming third despite lacking pace: "We saw we were struggling today: in Q1 we were P7, we saw problems also for Felipe in Q2, so it was maybe not an ideal weekend in terms of pace and we lost three points in the championship, but overall we have to be extremely happy."

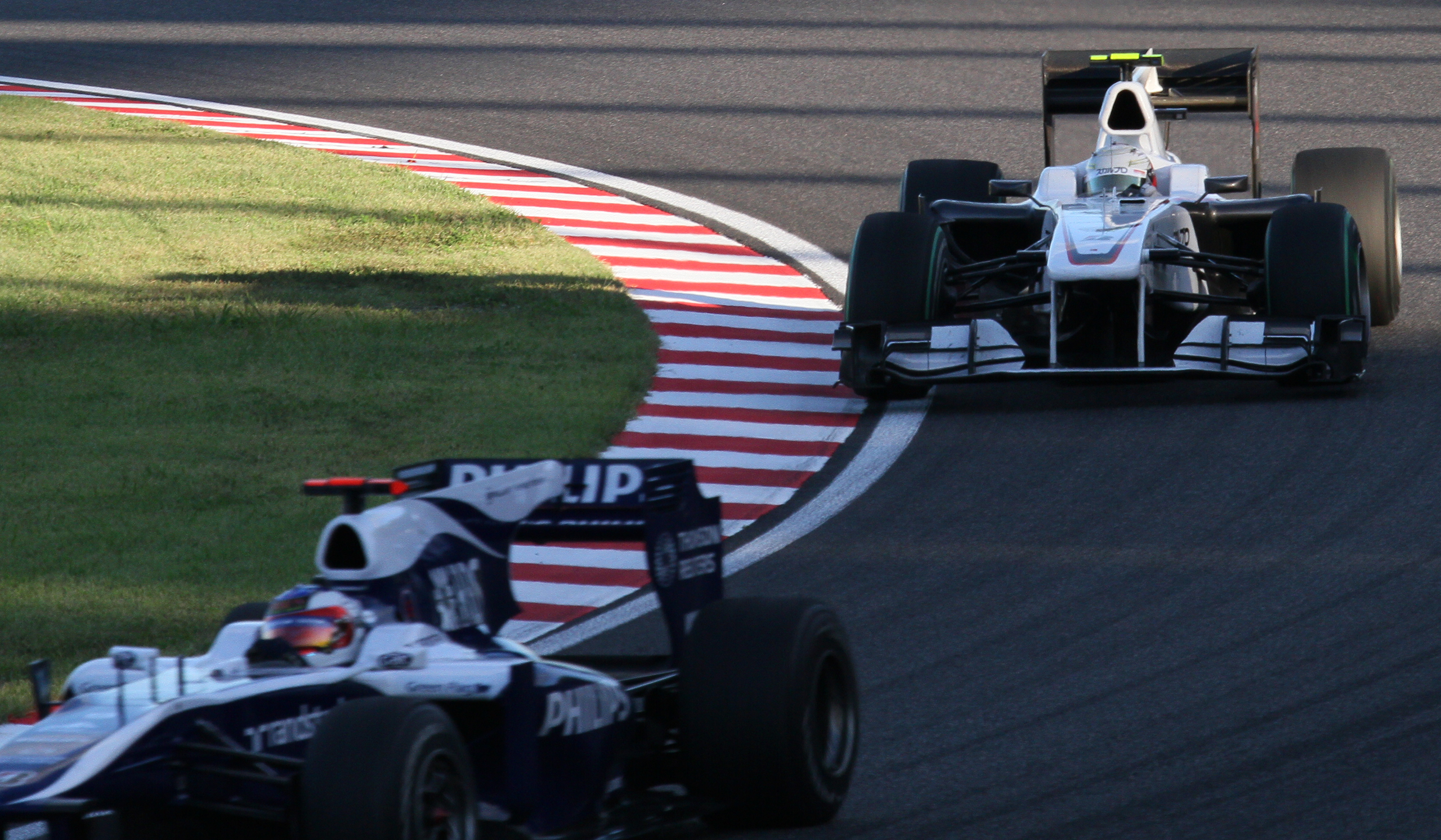
Kamui Kobayashi (in the black and white car) finished seventh and received praise for his performance during the event.

Hamilton spoke of his fear, due to the noises he could hear coming from his gearbox, that he would not finish the event, but said he was satisfied to finish and remained optimistic about his title chances: "There are still three races to go and 75 points available, so we'll remain optimistic and keep doing the best job we can. I'll keep fighting." His teammate Button believed other drivers would struggle on the soft compound tyres and would need to review the data to determine why he remained on the circuit for a long period of time, saying: "It was quite a tough race on such old tyres. I don't mean we would have finished any further up but I think it is just useful information for the future." Kobayashi said he was happy to finish seventh: "It was a great race for our team, and I'm very pleased for the Japanese fans who have watched an exciting race. It is the second time we have got both cars in the points, and for me it was really something to come back here and race for the first time after seven years in front of my home crowd." Both James Key and Monisha Kaltenborn said they were impressed with Kobayashi's driving and overtakes. Kaltenborn expressed hope Kobayashi's performance would result in Japanese sponsors supporting the driver.

The FIA stewards investigated both of the first lap collisions. They deemed Petrov responsible for causing the accident with Hülkenberg and imposed a five-place grid penalty on him for the following Korean Grand Prix. The stewards decided the collision between Liuzzi and Massa was "a racing incident". Massa commented on the moments before colliding with Liuzzi: "I saw that Sutil was on the left so when I saw him I tried to go to the right, because Rosberg was going to the left as well. But then when he saw that Sutil was alongside and that I was on the right, so anticipated a little bit the corner and then I had no space." Liuzzi remarked that Massa "seemed to come into my side like a bullet" and believed the former had no control of his vehicle. Éric Boullier, the Renault team principal, thought Kubica could have achieved a top-three result had he not retired but doubted his pace could have been enough to challenge the Red Bull team: "we still need to work a lot to make the car much easier to drive for our drivers. I think we can expect a couple of results before the end of the season." Di Grassi said driver error was not a consequence of his reconnaissance lap accident.

The final result of the Grand Prix meant Webber with 220 championship points extended his lead over Alonso in the World Drivers' Championship to 14 championship points with his teammate Vettel moving from fourth to third to tie Alonso with 206 championship points. (Note: This was the last time an Australian driver would lead the World Drivers' Championship until Oscar Piastri led it following the 2025 Saudi Arabian Grand Prix.) As a result of his finishing fifth, Hamilton with 192 championship points was demoted from third to fourth and his teammate Button with 189 championship points remained in fifth. Red Bull further increased their World Constructors' Championship gap over McLaren in second by 45 championship points. Ferrari remained in third with 334 championship points while Mercedes in fourth had 176 championship points and Renault were fifth with 133 championship points with three races left in the season.

=== Race classification ===
Drivers who scored championship points are denoted in bold.

Pos	No.	Driver	Constructor	Laps	Time/Retired	Grid	Points
1	5	(Germany) **Sebastian Vettel**	**Red Bull-Renault**	53	1:30:27.323	1	25
2	6	(Australia) **Mark Webber**	**Red Bull-Renault**	53	+0.905	2	18
3	8	(Spain) **Fernando Alonso**	**Ferrari**	53	+2.721	4	15
4	1	(United Kingdom) **Jenson Button**	**McLaren-Mercedes**	53	+13.522	5	12
5	2	(United Kingdom) **Lewis Hamilton**	**McLaren-Mercedes**	53	+39.595	8	10
6	3	(Germany) **Michael Schumacher**	**Mercedes**	53	+59.933	10	8
7	23	(Japan) **Kamui Kobayashi**	**BMW Sauber-Ferrari**	53	+1:04.038	14	6
8	22	(Germany) **Nick Heidfeld**	**BMW Sauber-Ferrari**	53	+1:09.648	11	4
9	9	(Brazil) **Rubens Barrichello**	**Williams-Cosworth**	53	+1:10.846	7	2
10	16	(Switzerland) **Sébastien Buemi**	**Toro Rosso-Ferrari**	53	+1:12.806	18	1
11	17	(Spain) Jaime Alguersuari	Toro Rosso-Ferrari	52	+1 Lap	16	
12	19	(Finland) Heikki Kovalainen	Lotus-Cosworth	52	+1 Lap	20	
13	18	(Italy) Jarno Trulli	Lotus-Cosworth	51	+2 Laps	19	
14	24	(Germany) Timo Glock	Virgin-Cosworth	51	+2 Laps	22	
15	21	(Brazil) Bruno Senna	HRT-Cosworth	51	+2 Laps	23	
16	20	(Japan) Sakon Yamamoto	HRT-Cosworth	50	+3 Laps	24	
17	4	(Germany) Nico Rosberg	Mercedes	47	Wheel	6	
Ret	14	(Germany) Adrian Sutil	Force India-Mercedes	44	Engine	15	
Ret	11	(Poland) Robert Kubica	Renault	2	Wheel	3	
Ret	10	(Germany) Nico Hülkenberg	Williams-Cosworth	0	Collision	9	
Ret	7	(Brazil) Felipe Massa	Ferrari	0	Collision	12	
Ret	12	(Russia) Vitaly Petrov	Renault	0	Collision	13	
Ret	15	(Italy) Vitantonio Liuzzi	Force India-Mercedes	0	Collision	17	
DNS	25	(Brazil) Lucas di Grassi	Virgin-Cosworth	0	Accident^{2}	21	

Notes
^2 – Lucas di Grassi was unable to start the Grand Prix due to him crashing heavily on his way to the starting grid.

== Championship standings after the race ==
Drivers' Championship standings

+/–	Pos.	Driver	Points
Unchanged	1	(Australia) Mark Webber*	220
Unchanged	2	(Spain) Fernando Alonso*	206
1	3	(Germany) Sebastian Vettel*	206
1	4	(United Kingdom) Lewis Hamilton*	192
Unchanged	5	(United Kingdom) Jenson Button*	189

Constructors' Championship standings

+/–	Pos.	Constructor	Points
Unchanged	1	(Austria) Red Bull-Renault*	426
Unchanged	2	(United Kingdom) McLaren-Mercedes*	381
Unchanged	3	(Italy) Ferrari*	334
Unchanged	4	(Germany) Mercedes	176
Unchanged	5	(France) Renault	133
Sources:

- Note: Only the top five positions are included for both sets of standings.
- Bold text and an asterisk indicates competitors who still had a theoretical chance of becoming World Champion.

== Footnotes ==
Previous race: 2010 Singapore Grand Prix	FIA Formula One World Championship; 2010 season	Next race: 2010 Korean Grand Prix
Previous race: 2009 Japanese Grand Prix	Japanese Grand Prix	Next race: 2011 Japanese Grand Prix
