= 2010 Singapore Grand Prix =

Fifteenth round of the 2010 Formula One season

Race 15 of 19 in the 2010 Formula One World Championship
← Previous race	Next race →
- Marina Bay Street Circuit

Race details
- Date: 26 September 2010
- Official name: 2010 Formula 1 SingTel Singapore Grand Prix
- Location: Marina Bay Street Circuit, Marina Bay, Singapore
- Course: Street Circuit
- Course length: 5.073 km (3.152 miles)
- Distance: 61 laps, 309.316 km (192.201 (Note: There is an offset of 0.137 km (0.085 mi) between the start and finish line.) miles)
- Weather: Clear; Air temp 29 to 30 °C (84 to 86 °F), Track temp 31 °C (88 °F)
- Attendance: 244,050 (3-Day Total); 81,350 (3-Day Average)

Pole position
Driver	(Spain) Fernando Alonso	Ferrari
- Time: 1:45.390

Fastest lap
Driver	(Spain) Fernando Alonso	Ferrari
- Time: 1:47.976 on lap 58

Podium
First	(Spain) Fernando Alonso	Ferrari
Second	(Germany) Sebastian Vettel	Red Bull-Renault
Third	(Australia) Mark Webber	Red Bull-Renault

The 2010 Singapore Grand Prix (formally the 2010 Formula 1 SingTel Singapore Grand Prix) was a Formula One motor race held on 26 September 2010, at the Marina Bay Street Circuit, Marina Bay, Singapore. It was the 15th race of the 2010 Formula One World Championship, and the third Singapore Grand Prix held as part of the Formula One World Championship. Ferrari driver Fernando Alonso won the 61-lap race from pole position. The Red Bull pairing of Sebastian Vettel and Mark Webber were second and third.

Webber led the World Drivers' Championship and his team Red Bull led the World Constructors' Championship going into the race. Alonso earned pole position by setting the fastest lap in the third qualifying session and he held off Vettel to maintain his start line advantage on the first lap. Lewis Hamilton, who started third, fought off teammate Jenson Button to retain his start position. The top two remained the same through the first and only round of pit stops. Webber's team, Red Bull, opted to pit him early allowing him to move ahead of Hamilton. The race was neutralised by the deployment of the safety car after Kamui Kobayashi and Bruno Senna crashed on lap 31. Hamilton retired after a collision with Webber shortly after the race restarted on lap 36. Alonso maintained the lead for the remainder of the race under pressure from Vettel.

The race was Alonso's second consecutive victory and his fourth of the 2010 season; he had started from pole position to win the Italian Grand Prix two weeks earlier. It also turned out to be Alonso's first and as of 2026, only grand slam of his career, which was also the last by a Ferrari driver until Charles Leclerc at the 2022 Australian Grand Prix. (Note: Ferrari had a grand slam at the 2022 Bahrain Grand Prix, which was achieved between two drivers.) Alonso's win moved him to second in the World Drivers' Championship, 11 championship points behind Webber. Hamilton's retirement dropped him to third, while Vettel's second-place finish moved him to fourth past Button. In the World Constructors' Championship, Red Bull extended its lead over McLaren to 24 championship points, with Ferrari a further 40 championship points behind, with four races remaining in the season.

== Background ==
The Singapore Grand Prix was the 15th round of the 2010 Formula One World Championship after taking a two-week break from the previous race in Italy. The event was held at the Marina Bay Street Circuit in Marina Bay, Singapore, on 26 September 2010. The Grand Prix was contested by twelve teams with two drivers each. The teams, also known as constructors, were McLaren, Mercedes, Red Bull, Ferrari, Williams, Renault, Force India, Toro Rosso, Lotus, Hispania, Sauber, and Virgin. Sole tyre supplier Bridgestone brought the green-striped side-walled super soft "options" and medium "primes" dry compounds, and the intermediate and full wet green-lined wet-weather compounds to the Grand Prix. The rules of 2010 Grand Prix races stipulated that all cars should use both types of tyre during a race unless the driver used any one of two wet-weather compounds. Each driver was limited to 11 sets of dry tyres for the weekend.

Before the race, Red Bull driver Mark Webber led the World Drivers' Championship with 187 championship points. He was ahead of Lewis Hamilton in second with 182 championship points and Fernando Alonso in third on 166 championship points. Hamilton's teammate Jenson Button was fourth with 165 championship points, and Sebastian Vettel was fifth on 163 championship points. Red Bull was leading the World Constructors' Championship with 350 championship points; McLaren and Ferrari were second and third with 347 and 290 championship points respectively, while Mercedes on 158 and Renault with 127 championship points contended for fourth position.

Singapore was a critical race in the championship as all five drivers had a chance to take the lead with a victory. The situation was made difficult for Alonso as he had used his allocation of eight engines following the Italian Grand Prix, and to replace one would incur a ten-place grid penalty. His rivals each had at least one untouched engine in reserve; Webber had two. Nevertheless, Alonso set himself the target to score championship points in Singapore. He also acknowledged that his car was not the fastest in the field and felt he needed five podiums in the season's five remaining races. Webber stated that he expected Singapore to be a tough weekend for him after he had retired from the event in 2008 and 2009, but felt there was still some time before a driver clinched the championship. After crashing out of the first lap of the Italian Grand Prix, Hamilton said he would push hard to stay in championship contention: "I'll take each race as it comes, but I'll also be making sure I get to the finish of the next five races, that's more important than anything. I go to Singapore to win." Hamilton felt Alonso was the favourite to win the Grand Prix and viewed the latter as his main rival for the Drivers' Championship which was shared by Red Bull team principal Christian Horner. Button himself believed Alonso would have an extra advantage as the latter's teammate Felipe Massa was out of contention for the title.

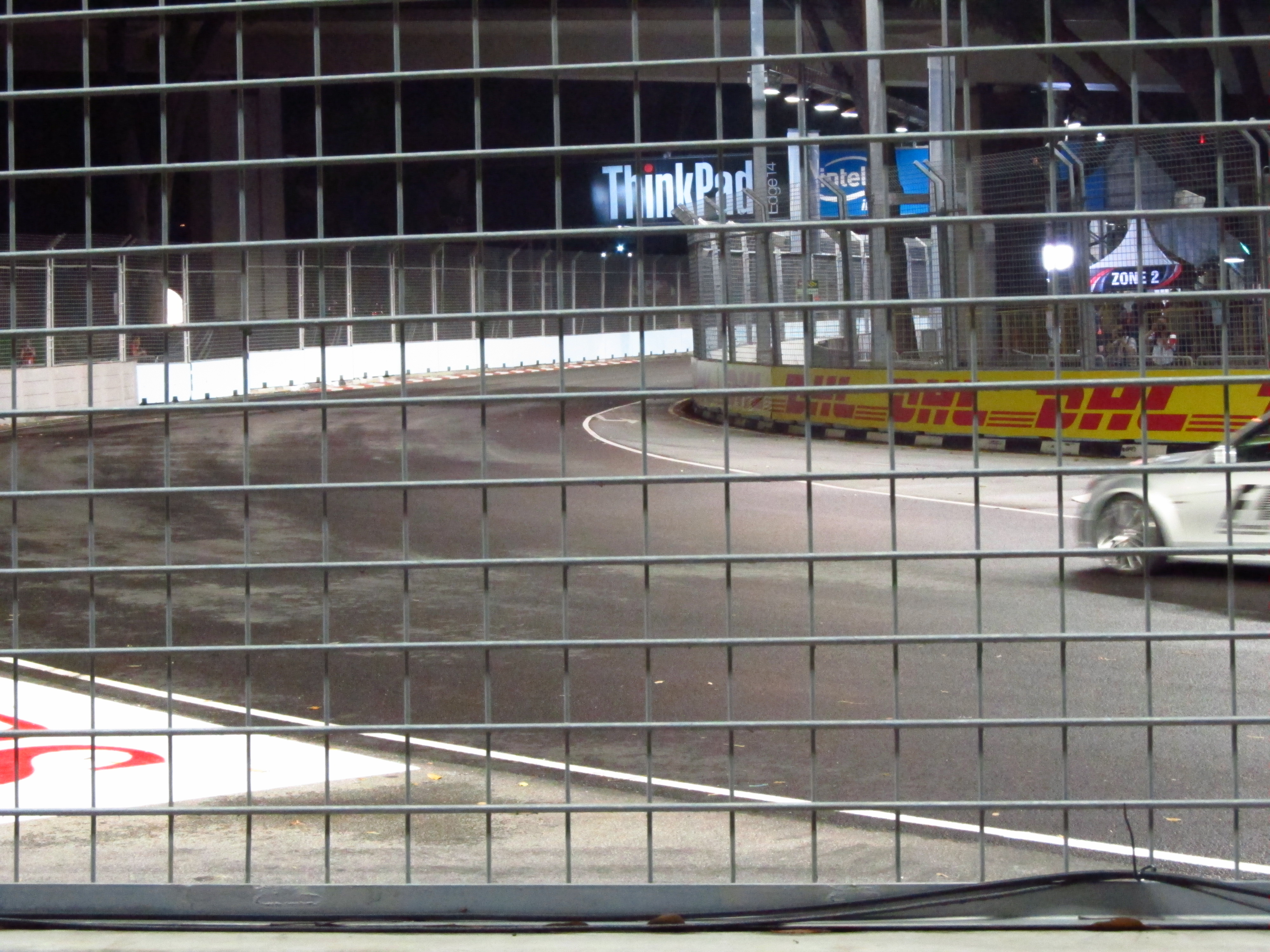
The fifth turn of the Marina Bay Street Circuit, one of the areas resurfaced in an effort to reduce bumpiness

The Marina Bay Street Circuit was resurfaced between turns three and seven, along with turns thirteen to seventeen, after drivers complained about its bumpiness following the 2009 Singapore Grand Prix. The Singapore Sling chicane was adjusted to allow for a more gradual curve to exist which enabled a safer exit for drivers. The outside wall at turn 21 was brought closer towards the race track to cover up half of a drain which was previously exposed to cars, and the pit lane was resurfaced to allow for a smoother exit for drivers rejoining the circuit. Hamilton, a vocal critic of the circuit's condition, described it as "dangerous" because it had remained uneven, and said the Singapore Sling chicane was "the worst corner I have ever driven in Formula One" despite the safety modifications made to it. The organisers of the Singapore Grand Prix introduced a new machine to clean the surface of the track after drivers had problems with a dusty and slippery track surface in the previous year's race. Two days before the first practice session, drivers expressed concerns over low visibility caused by rain showers combined with the glare from the circuit lighting.

There were two driver changes for the event. Hispania Racing announced that Sakon Yamamoto, one of the team's drivers since the season's 10th race, was to be replaced for the weekend by the team's reserve driver Christian Klien because he was suffering from food poisoning. Several journalists noticed a seemingly healthy Yamamoto in the paddock, suggesting that he had been dropped for sponsorship reasons instead. Team principal Colin Kolles confirmed that the arrangement would be for one race and Yamamoto would return to race at Suzuka. Pedro de la Rosa was summarily dropped by Sauber and replaced by Pirelli test driver Nick Heidfeld, who last drove for the Sauber team in 2009. The change was made because of De la Rosa's poor performance relative to that of teammate Kamui Kobayashi, and Heidfeld's knowledge of the Marina Bay Street Circuit and the Yas Marina Circuit.

Several teams made modifications to their cars in preparation for the event. McLaren, Red Bull, and Williams all revised their front wings. McLaren's revision was designed to separate airflow into two separate channels, with both directing airflow around the outside of the car's front tyres. Red Bull's design, used in the Friday practice sessions, had two vertical slots to the rear of its endplate along with another to avoid creating a vortex when it operated with the planes and endplate. A previous design, debuted at the British Grand Prix, was used both in qualifying and in the race. In addition, the team used a revised diffuser to allow for better management of airflow to the top of the diffuser's side section. Williams's design debuted for the first time and was designed to make the tyre act like a diffuser which took air in to improve its efficiency.

== Practice ==
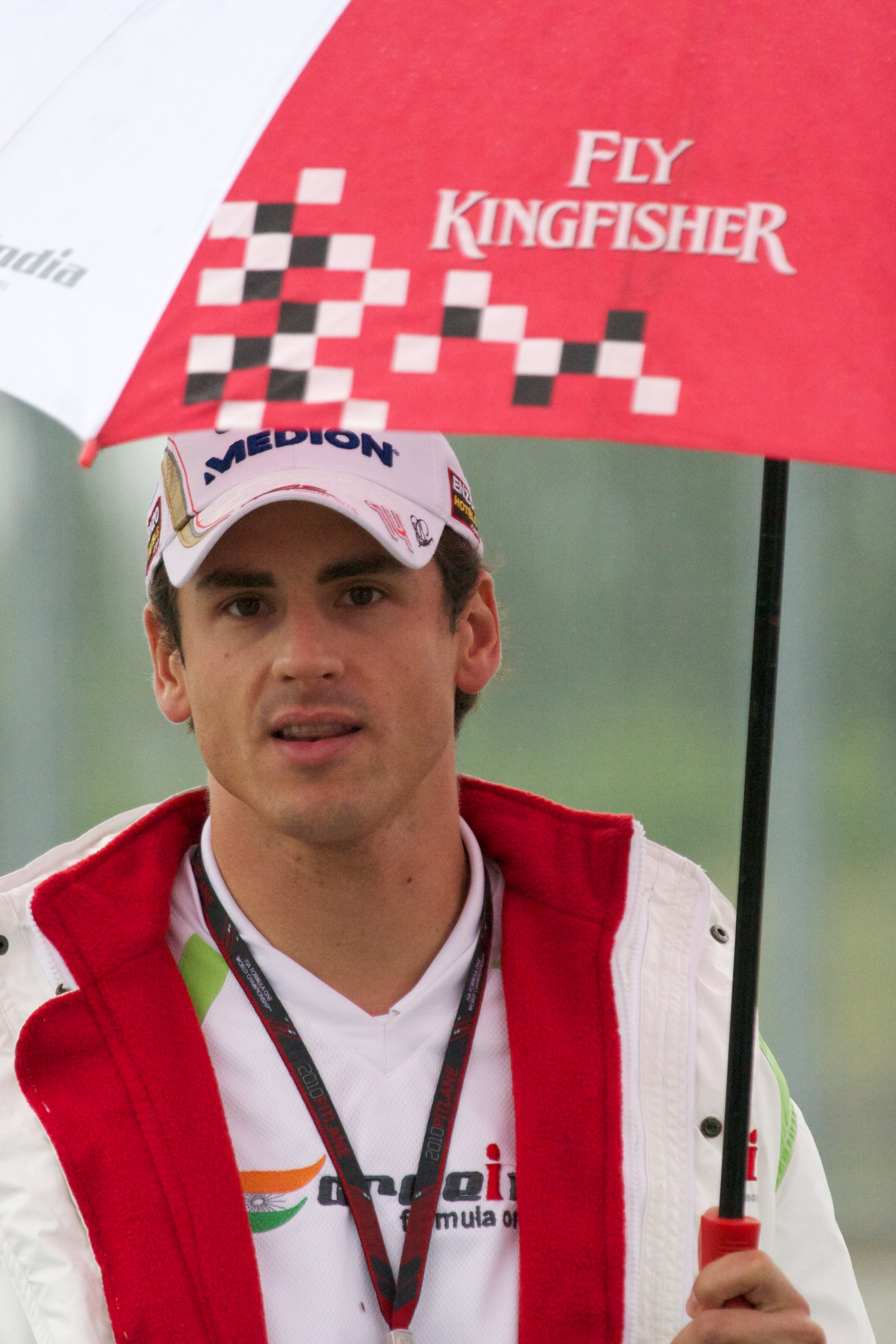
Adrian Sutil, who damaged his Force India's suspension in a crash during the second practice session.

There were three practice sessions held in accordance with the 2010 regulations: two 90-minute sessions on Friday morning and afternoon and one 60-minute session on Saturday morning. The first practice session was initially held on a wet track with a clear sky after rainstorms earlier in the day left standing water on parts of the circuit, and high humidity slowed the drying process. These conditions meant drivers used intermediate tyres first before dry tyres were utilised in the session's closing minutes. Webber set the fastest time of the first session with a late lap of 1:54.589, one-tenth of a second faster than Michael Schumacher in second who was briefly quickest before Webber set his lap. Adrian Sutil was third fastest ahead of Vettel, Jaime Alguersuari, Button, Vitantonio Liuzzi, Sébastien Buemi, Kubica, and Vitaly Petrov in positions four through ten.

In the second practice session, when the track was still damp in some sections, Vettel set the fastest time of the night, a lap of 1:46.660 on super-soft tyres; Webber finished with the second fastest lap. Button drove aggressively and battled Vettel for the fastest time throughout before he ended with the third quickest lap, half a second off Vettel's pace. Alonso, who was fourth fastest, ran wide at turn 17 while on a quick lap and slid down the access road at the next corner; he stalled while attempting to rejoin the track and abandoned his car requiring marshals to push his Ferrari away from the track. Hamilton, Barrichello and Massa were in positions five to seven. The two Mercedes drivers were eighth and tenth; with Nico Rosberg ahead of Schumacher, separated by Kubica. Sutil's Force India was launched into the air when he hit a kerb at the Singapore Sling chicane and his front-left suspension was broken upon landing requiring him to miss half the session, and Alguersuari's left-rear tyre made contact with a barrier but he avoided major damage to his car. Sutil was fined US$10,000 (£6,300) by the stewards because he attempted to drive back to the pit lane in his damaged car and did not stop at a safe position on the circuit.

Rain hit the circuit on Saturday afternoon, ending three hours before the session started, resulting in several damp patches on the circuit though the air temperature remained hot. Different sections of the circuit dried out at different rates making it difficult for drivers to tell precisely how wet or dry certain corners were. The teams ran intermediate tyres before switching to the super-soft tyre as the session progressed. Some drivers ran deep into turn five. Vettel was the session's fastest driver with a time of 1:48.028 set in the last 20 minutes. He was four-tenths faster than Alonso. Hamilton, Massa, Rosberg, Webber, Nico Hülkenberg, Kubica, Sutil and Buemi rounded out the top ten. Hispania Racing driver Bruno Senna's right-rear tyre got onto a white line at the Singapore Sling chicane and spun. Senna later brushed a wall entering the Esplanade Bridge in the final minute and stopped his car, causing the yellow-flags to be shown; drivers were unable to improve on their lap times because of the limited time available.

== Qualifying ==
Saturday evening's qualifying session was divided into three parts. The first part lasted 20 minutes and eliminated the cars that finished 18th or lower. The second session lasting 15 minutes eliminated cars from 11th to 17th. The final ten-minute session set pole position to tenth. Cars which competed in the final session were not allowed to change tyres before the race; these started the race fitted with the tyres with which they set their quickest lap times. It was held in dry weather conditions. Alonso was fastest in the first and third sessions, and clinched his second consecutive pole position with a lap time of 1:45.390 which he set on his first run of the third session. He was restricted to one timed lap in the second session because of an engine mapping problem, which meant Ferrari immediately re-programmed Alonso's engine upon discovering the issue. Vettel, who recorded a lap 0.067 seconds slower, was second and felt he could have taken pole position as he misjudged a gap while following Schumacher and brushed a wall exiting the Singapore Sling chicane. Hamilton qualified third and was happy with his starting position despite losing downforce on the track's final sector while running in teammate Button's tow. Button secured fourth and pushed hard in the final session which meant he had slight damage to his rear tyres on his first run, and could not get the optimum tyre temperature in the first section on his second run. Webber managed fifth and admitted that he was struggling to find a good rhythm when driving the circuit. Barrichello qualified in sixth. The two Mercedes drivers took seventh and ninth; Rosberg ahead of Schumacher. Rosberg believed that he should have performed better in qualifying than in the practice session, as he felt the soft tyres lacked grip; Schumacher was satisfied with his qualifying performance. The Mercedes drivers were separated by Kubica, in the faster Renault, who was happy with his lap time despite his car sliding from a lack of grip. Kobayashi was 10th.

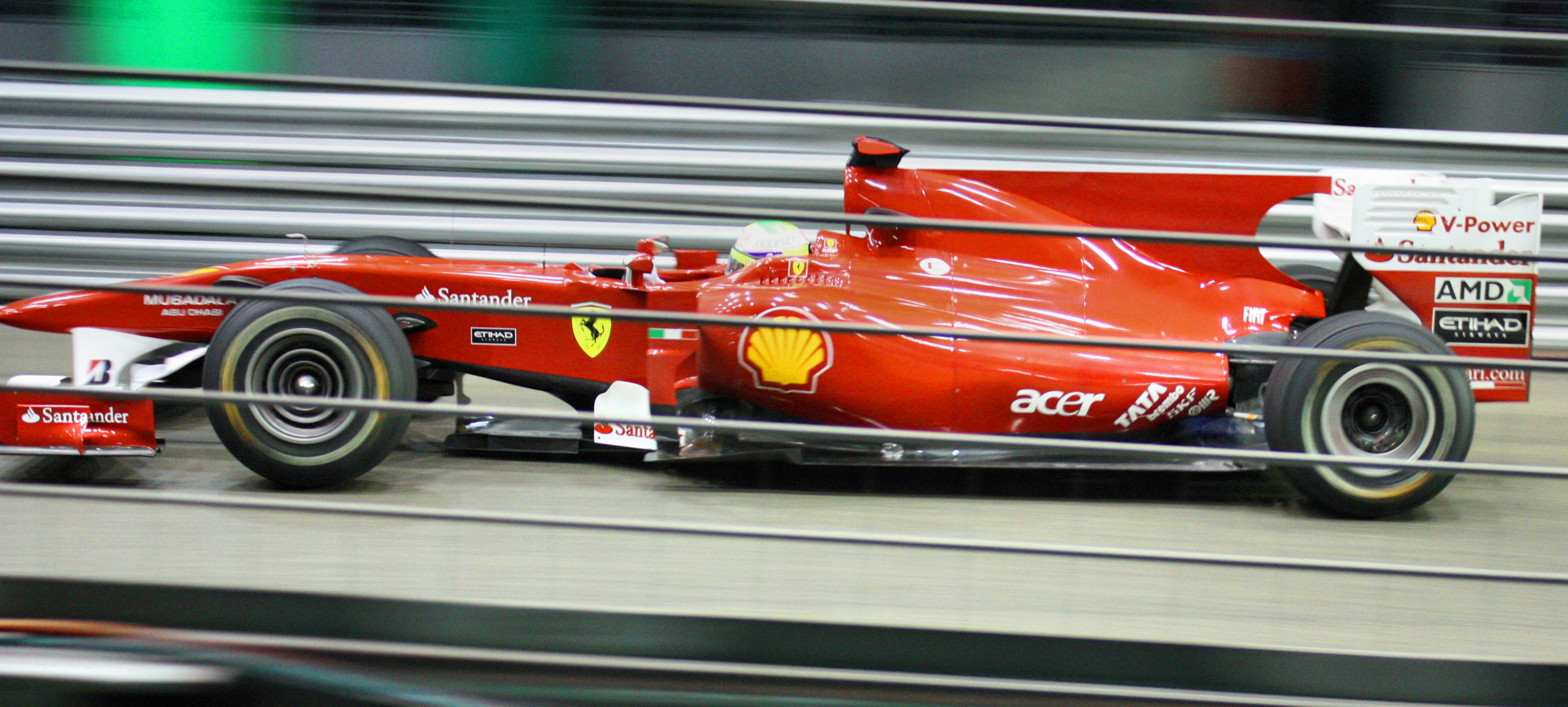
Felipe Massa used his ninth engine of the season after his gearbox failed in qualifying.

Alguersuari, who qualified 11th, was the fastest driver not advancing to the final session. His best time of 1:47.666 was 1.8 seconds slower than Vettel's pace in the second session. Alguersuari's time was followed by Hülkenberg, who was backed up by Sutil on his first run in the second session, and described his car's balance like "night and day". Hülkenberg was demoted five positions on the grid after the Williams team changed his gearbox after the race at Monza. As a consequence, Petrov inherited 12th position having pushed hard on a set of option tyres. He had lost control of his car after he went deep, under braking, heading for turn five (a corner that was damp from the earlier rain shower), with his right-rear wheel hitting the wall. Petrov's crash meant he took no further part in qualifying. He was ahead of Buemi, in the slower of the two Toro Rossos, who lost a large amount of grip and got stuck in traffic. Heidfeld took 14th ahead of his fellow countryman Sutil in 15th. Liuzzi had a problem with his front brakes on the first run of the second session and managed 16th. Timo Glock, Heikki Kovalainen and Lucas di Grassi were the quickest drivers unable to advance beyond the first part of qualifying. Lotus's Jarno Trulli was 21st, Klien claimed 22nd and Senna took 23rd. Massa was unable to set a timed lap as his gearbox seized without warning forcing him to stop on the circuit; Ferrari chose to replace his engine and gearbox as a precaution. Massa's engine change was his ninth of the season which incurred a ten-place grid penalty, but since he started from 24th position, the penalty was nullified.

=== Qualifying classification ===
The fastest lap in each of the three sessions is denoted in bold.

Pos	No.	Driver	Constructor	Q1	Q2	Q3	Grid
1	8	(Spain) Fernando Alonso	Ferrari	**1:46.541**	1:45.809	**1:45.390**	1
2	5	(Germany) Sebastian Vettel	Red Bull-Renault	1:46.960	**1:45.561**	1:45.457	2
3	2	(United Kingdom) Lewis Hamilton	McLaren-Mercedes	1:48.296	1:46.042	1:45.571	3
4	1	(United Kingdom) Jenson Button	McLaren-Mercedes	1:48.032	1:46.490	1:45.944	4
5	6	(Australia) Mark Webber	Red Bull-Renault	1:47.088	1:46.908	1:45.977	5
6	9	(Brazil) Rubens Barrichello	Williams-Cosworth	1:48.183	1:47.019	1:46.236	6
7	4	(Germany) Nico Rosberg	Mercedes	1:48.554	1:46.783	1:46.443	7
8	11	(Poland) Robert Kubica	Renault	1:47.657	1:46.949	1:46.593	8
9	3	(Germany) Michael Schumacher	Mercedes	1:48.425	1:47.160	1:46.702	9
10	23	(Japan) Kamui Kobayashi	BMW Sauber-Ferrari	1:48.908	1:47.559	1:47.884	10
11	17	(Spain) Jaime Alguersuari	Toro Rosso-Ferrari	1:48.127	1:47.666	N/A	11
12	10	(Germany) Nico Hülkenberg	Williams-Cosworth	1:47.984	1:47.674	N/A	17^{1}
13	12	(Russia) Vitaly Petrov	Renault	1:48.906	1:48.165	N/A	12
14	16	(Switzerland) Sébastien Buemi	Toro Rosso-Ferrari	1:49.063	1:48.502	N/A	13
15	22	(Germany) Nick Heidfeld	BMW Sauber-Ferrari	1:48.696	1:48.557	N/A	14
16	14	(Germany) Adrian Sutil	Force India-Mercedes	1:48.496	1:48.899	N/A	15
17	15	(Italy) Vitantonio Liuzzi	Force India-Mercedes	1:48.988	1:48.961	N/A	16
18	24	(Germany) Timo Glock	Virgin-Cosworth	1:50.721	N/A	N/A	18
19	19	(Finland) Heikki Kovalainen	Lotus-Cosworth	1:50.915	N/A	N/A	19
20	25	(Brazil) Lucas di Grassi	Virgin-Cosworth	1:51.107	N/A	N/A	20
21	18	(Italy) Jarno Trulli	Lotus-Cosworth	1:51.641	N/A	N/A	21
22	20	(Austria) Christian Klien	HRT-Cosworth	1:52.964	N/A	N/A	22
23	21	(Brazil) Bruno Senna	HRT-Cosworth	1:54.174	N/A	N/A	23
24	7	(Brazil) Felipe Massa	Ferrari	N/A^{2}	N/A	N/A	24^{3}

Notes

1. – Nico Hülkenberg was given a five-place grid penalty for changing his gearbox after the Italian Grand Prix.
2. – Felipe Massa failed to set a lap time after stopping on the circuit in the first part of the qualifying session.
3. – Ferrari replaced Massa's gearbox and engine – his ninth for the season – after his stoppage in qualifying; Massa could not be penalised (15 place penalty) because he had already qualified last after failing to set a time.

== Race ==
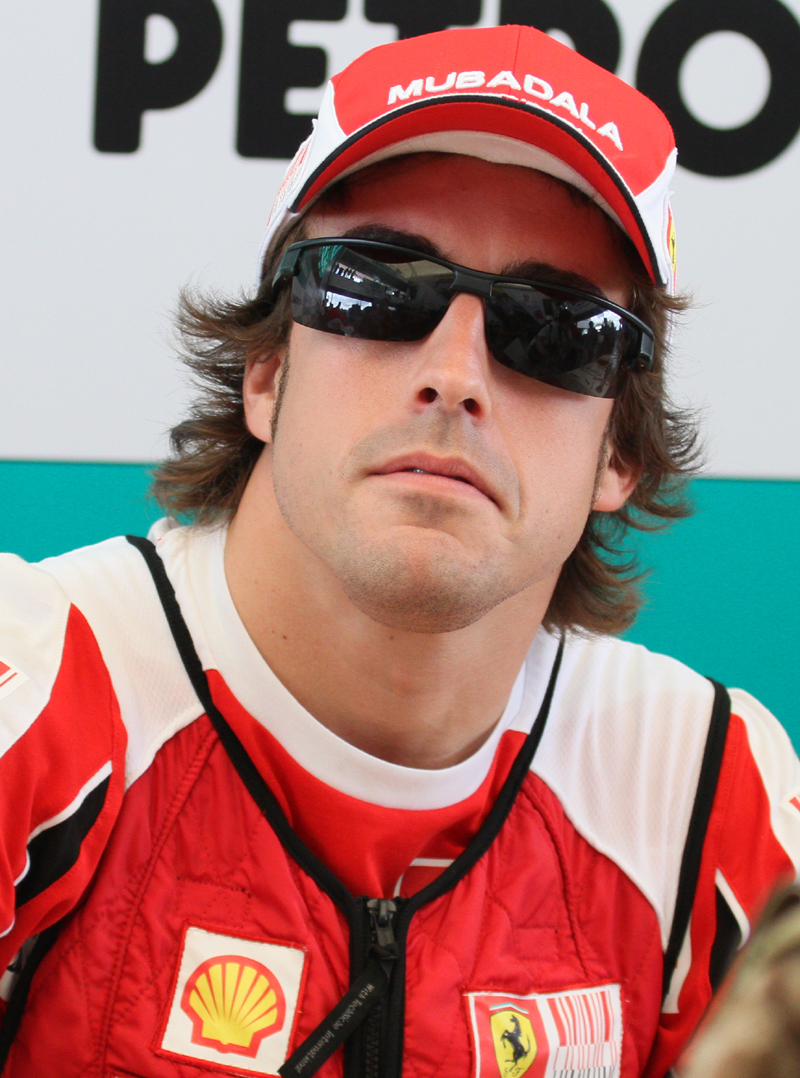
Fernando Alonso won his fourth race of the season in Singapore and achieved the first Formula One grand chelem since 2004.

The race began at 20:00 Singapore Standard Time (UTC+8). The conditions on the grid were dry and cloudy before the race; the air temperature ranged between 29 and 32 °C (84 and 90 °F) and the track temperature was 31 °C (88 °F); no rain was predicted during the race. Most drivers started on the super-soft compound tyre. Alguersuari started from the pit lane as his team discovered a coolant leak in his car. As the five red lights went out to signal the start of the race, Alonso maintained his pole position advantage heading into the first corner and withstood Vettel's attempt to pass him. Button got an early advantage over teammate Hamilton, but Hamilton fought him to retain third place. Barrichello fell from sixth to eighth place. Kubica passed Rosberg at the start but the German regained sixth position in the same lap. Further down the field, the early momentum was broken when Heidfeld, attempting to overtake both Force India cars at turn seven, hit Sutil's rear, damaging his front wing. Liuzzi subsequently went into Heidfeld's rear-end after the latter squeezed him towards the wall, causing front wing damage to his car. Heidfeld made a pit stop for a replacement front wing at the end of lap one, while Massa made his sole pit stop for the medium compound tyres.

Liuzzi pulled over to the inside of the circuit on the third lap, at turn ten, with left-rear suspension damage resulting from contact with the wall. His retirement triggered the deployment of the safety car as marshals were required to push his car away from the track. Webber was the only top running driver to pit for the medium compound tyres during the safety car period on lap four. Red Bull had told Webber to enter the pit lane, assuring him that it was the right decision, though he questioned the move. Several drivers towards the rear also chose to pit. Racing resumed at the end of lap five when the safety car pulled into the pit lane. Webber immediately pushed hard and passed Glock for tenth position and a line of cars began to form behind Glock. Alonso began to pull away from Vettel as he set consecutive fastest laps. Webber passed Kobayashi at turn five to move into ninth on lap seven, and withstood an attempt to Kobayashi to reclaim ninth heading into turn seven. Hülkenberg and Petrov's wheels made contact and both drivers went off the circuit on the same lap; Hülkenberg managed to move ahead of Petrov with Massa taking advantage to pass Petrov. Webber caught Schumacher on lap 11 and passed the latter on the same lap at turn five after Schumacher ran wide. Vettel was told by his team to cool his brakes on the same lap as Alonso continued to extend his lead. Sutil got ahead of Glock for eleventh place three laps later and started to pull away from the queue behind Glock. Hülkenberg ran wide at turn seven on the same lap but did not lose any positions. Hülkenberg passed Glock in the first sector of the track for twelfth on lap 16.

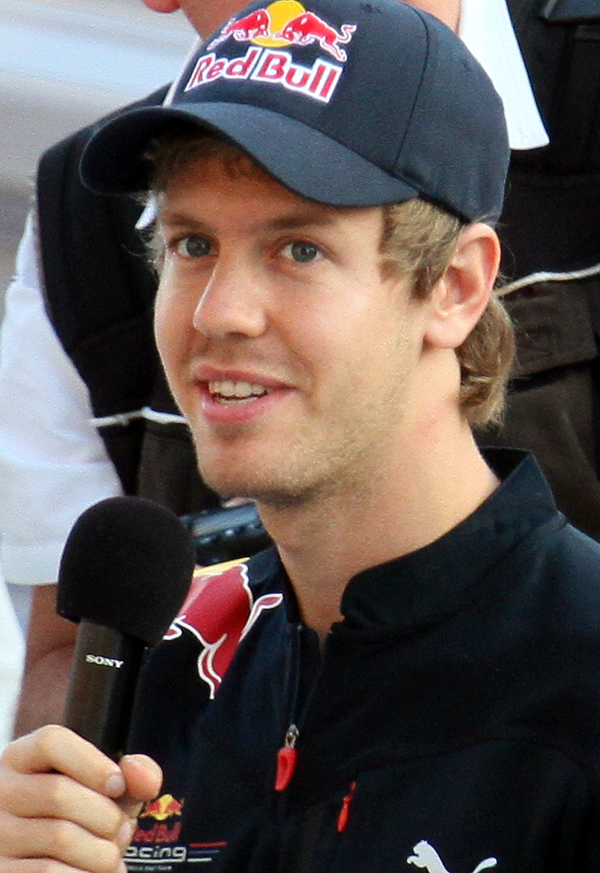
Sebastian Vettel finished second and moved up into fourth in the Drivers' Championship.

Vettel and Alonso traded fastest laps as they pushed hard in their efforts to build up a sufficient lead over Webber to maintain first and second positions after their pit stops. Massa, Petrov, Buemi and Alguersuari all passed Glock on lap 17 thus eliminating the queue of cars. By lap 20, Alonso was leading Vettel by 3.2 seconds; he, in turn, was a further 11 seconds in front of Hamilton. Button was in fourth, 20 seconds behind Alonso, with Rosberg 3.3 seconds behind the World Champion in fifth. Webber changed his engine settings to give him a higher top speed in an attempt to get past Barrichello and decrease the time gap to Hamilton on lap 22. He avoided colliding with an Armco barrier at the entry of turn 18 a lap later. Hamilton was told to increase his pace on the 24th lap to try to stay ahead of Webber after the pit stop phase. But his car had a large amount of oversteer, as his rear, super-soft, compound tyres began to deteriorate, causing his lap times to drop off the leader's pace. Trulli drove to the pit lane and was pushed by his mechanics into the Lotus garage to retire with a hydraulic issue on lap 28. Hamilton made the first scheduled stop for tyres on lap 29 and re-emerged in eighth position behind Webber. Alonso and Vettel made simultaneous pit stops on the following lap; Alonso retained his lead despite Vettel's pit crew completing their pit stop first; Vettel avoided stalling and drove away in second gear. With newer tyres which provided more grip, Vettel recorded faster lap times than Alonso to close the time gap as the two came across slower cars.

Kobayashi attempted to pass around the outside of Schumacher on lap 31 but the two made contact with Schumacher subsequently hitting a barrier. Kobayashi damaged his Sauber, losing control of his rear-end, and crashed at the exit of turn 18 after his front wing was knocked off entering the corner. Senna was slow to react and buried his Hispania nose-first into the barrier alongside Kobayashi. These incidents called for the race's second safety car period to allow removal of both cars from the circuit which were on the racing line. Klien was pushed into his garage to retire with a hydraulic problem on lap 34. The safety car pulled into the pit lane at the end of lap 35 and the race resumed with Alonso leading. Hamilton got a run on Webber who was caught behind Di Grassi and lined up an overtaking manoeuvre on Webber, and overtook him on the Raffles Boulevard straight. Webber's front-right tyre hit Hamilton's left-rear tyre at turn seven. He escaped without significant damage, while Hamilton had a punctured tyre and pulled off the circuit to retire for the second consecutive race. Webber felt vibrations on the front of his Red Bull car. His tyre, which made contact with Hamilton's, had been pushed 5 mm (0.20 in) off its normal mounting on the rim, and Button drew closer to Webber who managed to maintain a good pace. On lap 37, Schumacher ran into the rear of Heidfeld's car and limped back to the pit lane to replace his damaged front wing creating sparks as it was dragged along the surface of the track, while Heidfeld retired after hitting a barrier. Button was urged by his McLaren mechanics on lap 42 to push Webber whose tyres were older, while Vettel gradually closed the gap with Alonso. Hülkenberg, in ninth, made an error on lap 44 which allowed Massa to momentarily take advantage, but he fought back to retain ninth position. Kubica sustained a right-rear puncture on lap 46 and made a pit stop on the same lap, rejoining in 13th.

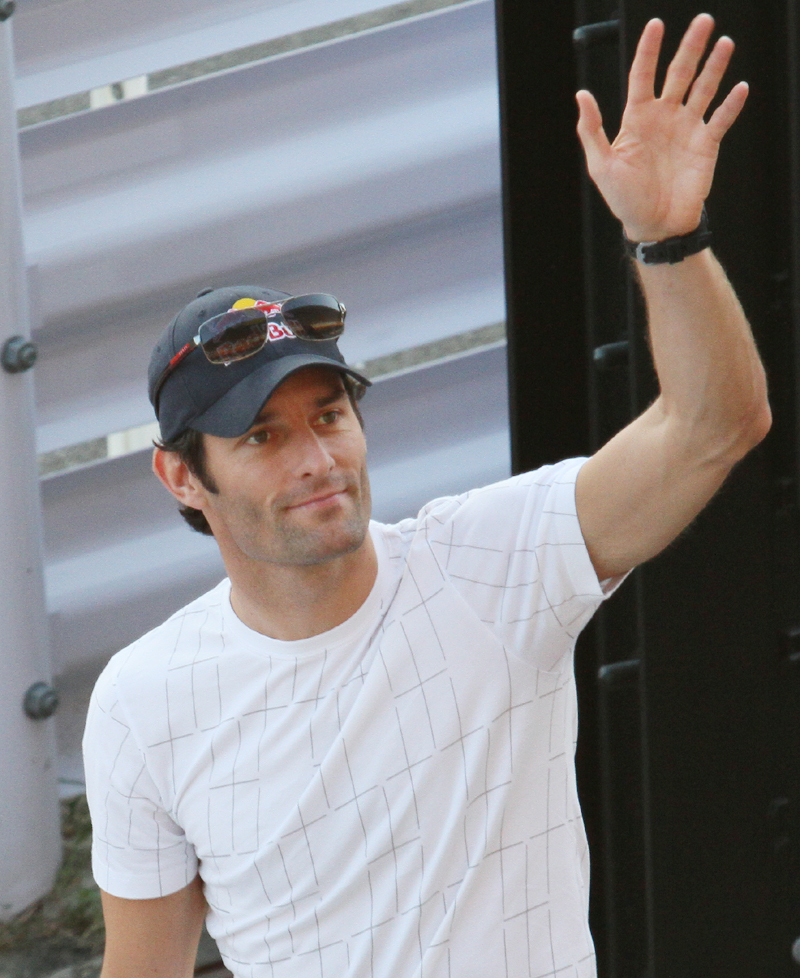
Mark Webber finished third after stopping early for tyres and increased his championship lead.

Upfront, Vettel had reduced the gap between himself and Alonso to one second by lap 50 as the pair continued to trade the fastest lap time. Glock started to slow on the circuit with an hydraulic system issue and drove to the pit lane to retire. With the advantage of having newer tyres which gave him more grip, Kubica passed Alguersuari, Buemi, his teammate Petrov, Massa, Hülkenberg, and Sutil (who was holding up a queue of five cars) within nine laps. Vettel continued to pressure Alonso in the closing laps as the pair began to encounter slower cars. Kovalainen and Buemi made contact in the final sector of the lap, with the latter spinning around in front of the Toro Rosso, who was quick to avoid a head-on collision. Kovalainen's car suffered a cracked fuel tank pressure release valve and he limped back to the pit lane, the rear of his Lotus catching fire during the final few turns. Kovalainen aborted the pit entry but did not make it much further as his car was consumed by the fire. Kovalainen stopped on the main straight and vacated his car to extinguish the fire himself after members of the Williams team handed him a fire extinguisher. As Kovalainen was off the racing line, yellow flags were waved in the final corners instead of a safety car deployment.

Vettel drew to within two-tenths of a second behind Alonso as the final lap started, and came across Sutil, Hülkenberg, Petrov and Massa; both drivers managed to get past Petrov, and Alonso maintained the lead heading into the final sector of the track. The yellow flag for Kovalainen's car meant that Vettel's final chance of an overtake, into the final corner, was denied, and Alonso took the checkered flag on lap 61 to win the race, 0.293 seconds ahead of Vettel. Alonso secured his first grand chelem (leading the while race from pole position to win with the fastest lap) of his career, which was Ferrari's last until the 2022 Bahrain Grand Prix, as well as the first since the 2008 French Grand Prix (both achieved across two drivers). (Note: The last Ferrari's single-driver grand chelem before Alonso's was Schumacher's at the 2004 Hungarian Grand Prix. At the 2022 Australian Grand Prix, Charles Leclerc became the first Ferrari driver since Alonso at Singapore to achieve a single-driver grand chelem.) Webber was third, 1.2 seconds ahead of Button in fourth. Rosberg, Barrichello and Kubica took the next three positions. Sutil held off Hülkenberg in the track's final sector for eighth and ninth on the line with Massa in tenth. Petrov, Alguersuari, Schumacher and Buemi finished one lap behind Alonso, with Di Grassi and Kovalainen (despite his retirement) the final classified finishers.

=== Post-race ===
The top three drivers appeared on the podium to collect their trophies and spoke to the media in a later press conference. Alonso said that his victory "meant a lot" for him to remain in contention for the Drivers' Championship and thanked his team for their efforts during the weekend. Alonso added that Ferrari would give "100 per cent" in the season's four remaining races and said the battle remained "very tight" despite scoring the most championship points out of all the drivers in the previous five races. Vettel said that he was hoping that Alonso would make a mistake but acknowledged that it was difficult to overtake on the circuit. He also said that attempting to overtake Alonso in the final stages of the race was "the only chance" that he had of winning the race and hoped that the remaining tracks would suit his Red Bull car. Webber stated that he was "very happy" with his third-place finish and said the entire race weekend was the toughest of the year on him. He also said that he did not feel comfortable throughout the weekend and that he was staying composed through certain sections of the race.

Alonso's win has been regarded as one of the best of his Formula One career. Former Formula One driver Martin Brundle described it as: "one of those races in which two drivers elevate themselves on to a separate plane from their rivals." It reminded him of the 2000 Japanese Grand Prix where Schumacher won that year's world championship from his main rival Mika Häkkinen. Will Saunders of crash.net said in 2014 that Alonso: "had little right to wrestle a performance of such magnitude out of either himself or the Ferrari, yet he found another level that day." After the eventual conclusion of the championship in Vettel's favour by four championship points, Saunders said: "Alonso's performance in Singapore showed he would have been an equally deserving championship victor." ESPN listed it as one of Alonso's top ten races while driving for Ferrari.

The stewards immediately investigated the accident between Webber and Hamilton on lap 37 and took no further action. Hamilton later reviewed the incident on video and was adamant that he was not at fault saying that he was "unlucky" for the second consecutive Grand Prix. Webber stated the contact nearly forced him to retire and compared the accident to Hamilton's collision with Massa at the Italian Grand Prix. Brundle felt Hamilton should have given Webber more space and agreed with the stewards' decision. Bridgestone director of motorsport tyre development Hirohide Hamashima stated Webber was "very lucky" to make the finish and that if left hand high-speed corners were installed on the track, the tyre would have moved more frequently and lost its pressure. Horner had also admitted that Webber had been lucky with his tyre lasting for a long distance.

Schumacher and Heidfeld's accident on lap 37 was investigated by the stewards who took no further action after deciding it was a "racing incident". Heidfeld felt Schumacher had braked too late and hoped that he would have had a better finishing position. Schumacher himself said that he was unhappy with his first race in Singapore but enjoyed the second half of the race. BBC pundit and former team principal, Eddie Jordan was highly critical of Schumacher arguing that the latter should have been sacked by Mercedes to prevent him from being "slaughtered" in the event he was unable to win another race. Mercedes team principal Ross Brawn came to Schumacher's defense and said his team was "happy" with his contribution. Motorsport pundits criticised Kovalainen's decision to stop his car on the pit straight after it had caught fire and argued that he was "irresponsible". Kovalainen defended his action arguing that it had not been safe to drive his Lotus into the pitlane due to the severity of the fire, and how close he would be driving to every team's fuel storage units. Nevertheless, Kovalainen's fire was voted the Moment of the Year by readers of Autosport magazine in December 2010 at the Autosport Awards held in London.

Sutil was given a 20-second time penalty by the stewards as he was deemed to gain an advantage by taking the outside line at turn seven on the first lap. This demoted him from eighth to tenth and promoted Hülkenberg from ninth to eighth and Massa from tenth to ninth. Following a protest from Force India, Hülkenberg was issued a 20-second time penalty after the stewards deemed him to have gained an advantage by corner-cutting. This ruling demoted Hülkenberg to tenth while Massa moved to eighth and Sutil inherited ninth. Force India withdrew an appeal of Sutil's penalty following the decision, and Williams technical director Sam Michael said that his team had accepted the stewards' judgement. The stewards elected not to penalise Senna after examining a video of his collision with the stationary Kobayashi. Kobayashi admitted that he was at fault and Senna believed the marshals were late reacting to Kobayashi's accident and felt his own crash was unavoidable.

As a consequence of the race, Webber increased his lead in the World Drivers' Championship. Alonso's victory moved him into second place, eleven championship points behind Webber. Hamilton's retirement dropped him to third place, nine championship points behind Alonso. Vettel's second-place finish moved him to fourth place, ahead of Button. In the World Constructors' Championship, Red Bull drew further ahead of McLaren who was now twenty-four championship points behind. Ferrari remained in third on 319 championship points, forty championship points behind McLaren. Mercedes increased their lead over Renault to 35 championship points with four races remaining in the season.

=== Race classification ===
Drivers who scored championship points are denoted in bold.

Pos	No.	Driver	Constructor	Laps	Time/Retired	Grid	Points
1	8	(Spain) **Fernando Alonso**	**Ferrari**	61	1:57:53.579	1	25
2	5	(Germany) **Sebastian Vettel**	**Red Bull-Renault**	61	+0.293	2	18
3	6	(Australia) **Mark Webber**	**Red Bull-Renault**	61	+29.141	5	15
4	1	(United Kingdom) **Jenson Button**	**McLaren-Mercedes**	61	+30.384	4	12
5	4	(Germany) **Nico Rosberg**	**Mercedes**	61	+49.394	7	10
6	9	(Brazil) **Rubens Barrichello**	**Williams-Cosworth**	61	+56.101	6	8
7	11	(Poland) **Robert Kubica**	**Renault**	61	+1:26.559	8	6
8	7	(Brazil) **Felipe Massa**	**Ferrari**	61	+1:53.297	24	4
9	14	(Germany) **Adrian Sutil**	**Force India-Mercedes**	61	+2:12.416^{4}	15	2
10	10	(Germany) **Nico Hülkenberg**	**Williams-Cosworth**	61	+2:12.791^{5}	17	1
11	12	(Russia) Vitaly Petrov	Renault	60	+1 lap	12	
12	17	(Spain) Jaime Alguersuari	Toro Rosso-Ferrari	60	+1 lap	11^{6}	
13	3	(Germany) Michael Schumacher	Mercedes	60	+1 lap	9	
14	16	(Switzerland) Sébastien Buemi	Toro Rosso-Ferrari	60	+1 lap	13	
15	25	(Brazil) Lucas di Grassi	Virgin-Cosworth	59	+2 laps	20	
16^{7}	19	(Finland) Heikki Kovalainen	Lotus-Cosworth	58	Fire	19	
Ret	24	(Germany) Timo Glock	Virgin-Cosworth	49	Hydraulics	18	
Ret	22	(Germany) Nick Heidfeld	BMW Sauber-Ferrari	36	Collision	14	
Ret	2	(United Kingdom) Lewis Hamilton	McLaren-Mercedes	35	Collision	3	
Ret	20	(Austria) Christian Klien	HRT-Cosworth	31	Hydraulics	22	
Ret	23	(Japan) Kamui Kobayashi	BMW Sauber-Ferrari	30	Accident	10	
Ret	21	(Brazil) Bruno Senna	HRT-Cosworth	29	Accident	23	
Ret	18	(Italy) Jarno Trulli	Lotus-Cosworth	27	Hydraulics	21	
Ret	15	(Italy) Vitantonio Liuzzi	Force India-Mercedes	1	Suspension	16	

Notes

1. – Adrian Sutil was penalised 20 seconds post-race for illegally gaining an advantage at turn seven on the first lap.
2. – Following a protest by Force India, Hülkenberg was penalised 20 seconds post-race for illegally gaining an advantage.
3. – Jaime Alguersuari started from the pit lane following a coolant leak before the race.
4. – Heikki Kovalainen was classified because he completed over 90% of the race distance.

== Championship standings after the race ==
Drivers' Championship standings

	Pos.	Driver	Points
	1	(Australia) Mark Webber*	202
1	2	(Spain) Fernando Alonso*	191
1	3	(United Kingdom) Lewis Hamilton*	182
1	4	(Germany) Sebastian Vettel*	181
1	5	(United Kingdom) Jenson Button*	177

Constructors' Championship standings

Pos.	Constructor	Points
1	(Austria) Red Bull-Renault*	383
2	(United Kingdom) McLaren-Mercedes*	359
3	(Italy) Ferrari*	319
4	(Germany) Mercedes	168
5	(France) Renault	133

- Note: Only the top five positions are included for both sets of standings.
- Bold text and an asterisk indicates competitors who still had a theoretical chance of becoming World Champion.

== Footnotes ==
Previous race: 2010 Italian Grand Prix	FIA Formula One World Championship; 2010 season	Next race: 2010 Japanese Grand Prix
Previous race: 2009 Singapore Grand Prix	Singapore Grand Prix	Next race: 2011 Singapore Grand Prix
Awards
Preceded by 2008 Brazilian Grand Prix	Autosport; Moment of the Year; 2010	Succeeded by Jean-Éric Vergne (2019)
