= McLaren MP4-26 =

Formula One racing car for 2011 season

- Jenson Button driving the MP4-26 at the Italian Grand Prix
- Category: Formula One
- Constructor: McLaren
- Designers: Neil Oatley (Executive Engineer); Paddy Lowe (Technical Director); Tim Goss (Engineering Director); Mark Williams (Head of Vehicle Engineering); Andrew Bailey (Head of Vehicle Design); Luca Furbatto (Project Leader); John Iley (Head of Aerodynamics); Doug McKiernan (Chief Aerodynamicist)
- Predecessor: McLaren MP4-25
- Successor: McLaren MP4-27

Technical specifications
- Chassis: Moulded carbon fibre honeycomb composite incorporating front and side impact structures and integral safety fuel cell
- Suspension (front): Inboard torsion bar / damper system operated by pushrod and bell crank with a double wishbone arrangement
- Suspension (rear): as front, except operated by pullrod and bell crank with a double wishbone arrangement
- Length: 5,070 mm (200 in)
- Width: 1,800 mm (71 in)
- Height: 950 mm (37 in)
- Engine: Mercedes-Benz FO 108Y 2.4 L (146 cu in) V8 (90°). Naturally aspirated, 18,000 RPM limited with KERS, mid-mounted.
- Transmission: McLaren Applied 7-speed + 1 reverse sequential seamless semi-automatic paddle shift with epicyclic differential and multi-plate limited slip clutch
- Battery: GS Yuasa lead acid
- Weight: 640 kg (1,411 lb) (including driver)
- Fuel: ExxonMobil High Performance Unleaded (5.75% bio fuel); Mobil Synergy Fuel System
- Lubricants: Mobil 1
- Tyres: Pirelli P Zero; Enkei wheels (front and rear): 13"

Competition history
- Notable entrants: Vodafone McLaren Mercedes
- Notable drivers: 3. (United Kingdom) Lewis Hamilton; 4. (United Kingdom) Jenson Button
- Debut: 2011 Australian Grand Prix
- First win: 2011 Chinese Grand Prix
- Last win: 2011 Abu Dhabi Grand Prix
- Last event: 2011 Brazilian Grand Prix
Races	Wins	Podiums	Poles	F/Laps
19	6	18	1	6

The McLaren MP4-26 was a Formula One racing car designed by McLaren for the 2011 Formula One season. The chassis was designed by Paddy Lowe, Neil Oatley, Tim Goss, Andrew Bailey and John Iley and was powered by a customer Mercedes-Benz engine. It was driven by Lewis Hamilton and Jenson Button, the 2008 and 2009 World Drivers' Champions, respectively. The car was launched on 4 February at Potsdamer Platz located in Berlin, Germany, shortly after the first test session of the season in Valencia. McLaren test driver Gary Paffett, Lewis Hamilton and Jenson Button drove an interim version of the car's predecessor, the MP4-25 at the first tests to get experience with the final tyre compounds provided by new tyre supplier Pirelli.

== Design ==
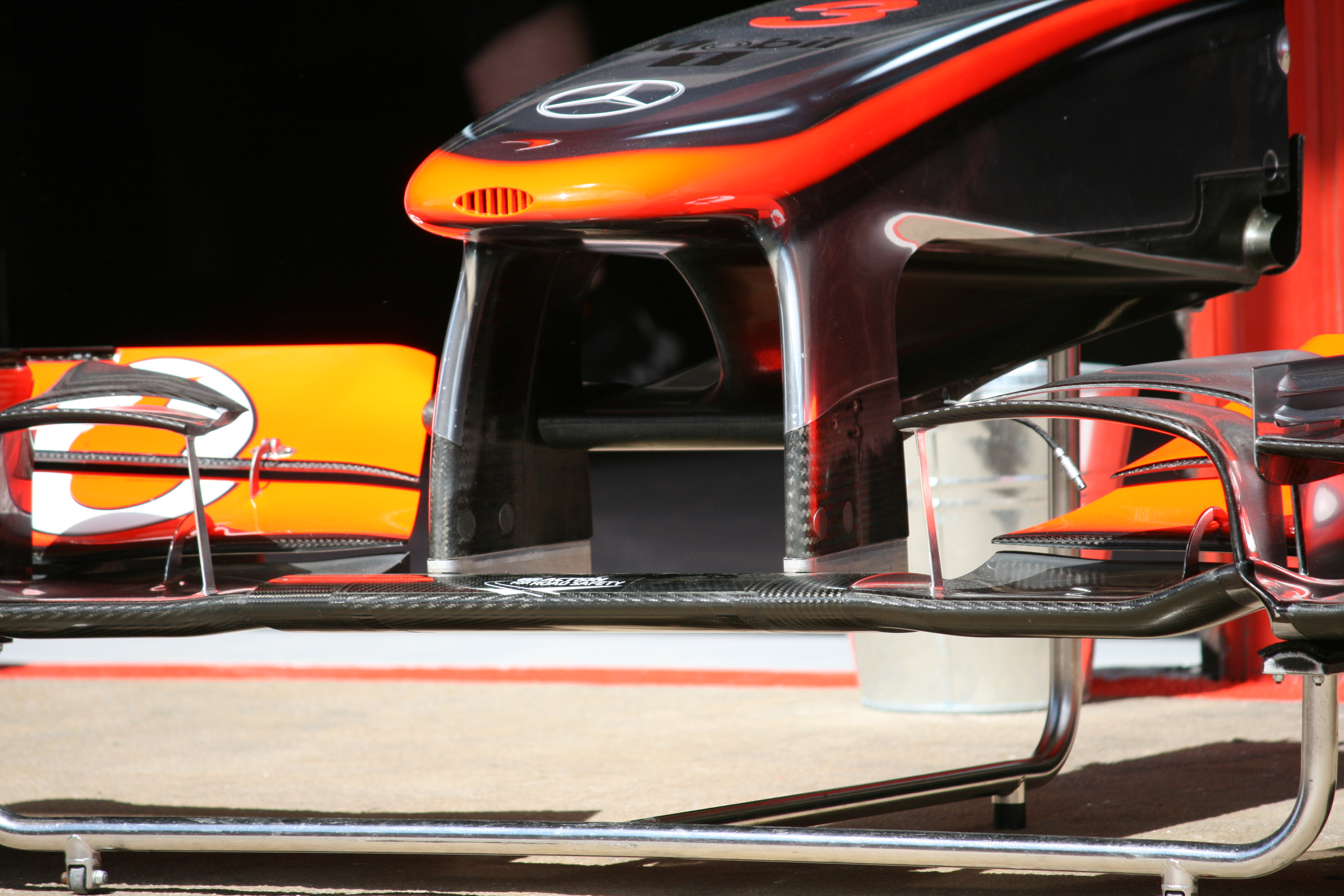
The MP4-26 front wing element as it was in pre-season testing

The car was noted for its unique "L-shaped" sidepod arrangement. Technical director Paddy Lowe has exploited to the extreme the idea of higher outer sidepods, last seen on the likes of Benetton's B195 from 1995 and Ferrari's F310 from 1996. The aim is to clean up and better direct the airflow to the beam wing at the rear of the car, an area now even more important thanks to the ban on double diffusers. This solution also gives McLaren the possibility of running Renault-R31-style forward exhaust exits.

All high-speed aerodynamic design is a compromise of downforce versus drag (where induced drag is an inevitable result of any lifting body), with air resistance (drag) rising in proportion to the cube of speed. In Formula One, lift is reversed to create downforce which results in improved traction, less driver steering wheel input, and therefore lower tyre wear. In order to stabilize the air flow over the car, in most Formula One car designs the dirty air from the front wheels is guided away from the radiators and the tail section by use of the barge boards and heavily sculpted lower body. However, the design of the MP4-26 was optimised to create down force from the air flow all over the car, including that from the front wheels:

- The car was elongated to maximum design length, to make the air flow as stable as possible when it reaches each section:
- The nose was high and long to create downward pressure
- The novel L-shaped air ducts, designed on the same principle as that used on the 1996 Ferrari F310, extended outwards and forced the dirty air off the front wheel towards the centre line and down over the car
- This unstable air was less efficient at cooling the car, so hence the need for a larger "L" sidepod design as defined by McLaren
- The rear was tightly packaged to create maximum stable airflow to the rear single diffuser of the car, so tight that there is a secondary air intake to aid cooling of the gearbox and hydraulics on the upper fin
- The rear used a pull-rod suspension system to keep everything compact and as far to the rear of the car as possible

McLaren admitted at the launch that there are a few extra design novelties which they did not show on the car, which were rumoured to include a Lotus Renault GP forward-airduct exiting exhaust system. Following problematic pre-season testing, McLaren had updated the exhaust system by the opening race of the season, the 2011 Australian Grand Prix.

== Season review ==
After not seeming that quick in pre-season testing, the MP4-26 arrived in Melbourne with some significant changes. It was instantly quicker than the Ferrari 150º Italia and quickest of all in Friday practice. Despite this, the Red Bull RB7 was evidently the quickest car, and Lewis Hamilton did well to qualify in second, albeit 0.778 seconds behind Vettel's Red Bull. It was a similar story in the race, Vettel charged off into the distance with Hamilton eventually finishing 22 seconds behind, leaving the car with a broken undertray. A drive through penalty meant that Jenson Button slipped from fourth to sixth. It was evident, even at this early stage, the MP4-26 needed some rapid improvements to challenge Red Bull in the Championship. At the Malaysian Grand Prix, it seemed as if McLaren had closed the gap, because the top five qualifying spots were still Vettel, Hamilton, Webber, Button and Alonso – but the gaps were roughly a tenth now. Vettel took a second victory from two races whilst the other McLaren managed to grace the podium, Button only 2 seconds behind Vettel. Meanwhile, Hamilton did not have such a successful race after contact with Alonso and a time penalty left him down in eighth. Only two races in, and things were looking dim for McLaren – already 24 points behind the Championship leader. There seem to be a change of fortune at the Chinese Grand Prix when second and third place qualifyings after a small challenge for pole turned into 1–2 in the race due to Vettel's bad start. Button stopping in the wrong pit box took the lead away from him and a different strategy put Hamilton behind Vettel once more. However, it was this strategy that saw Hamilton take victory away from Vettel with four laps to go. Button eventually finished the race fourth.

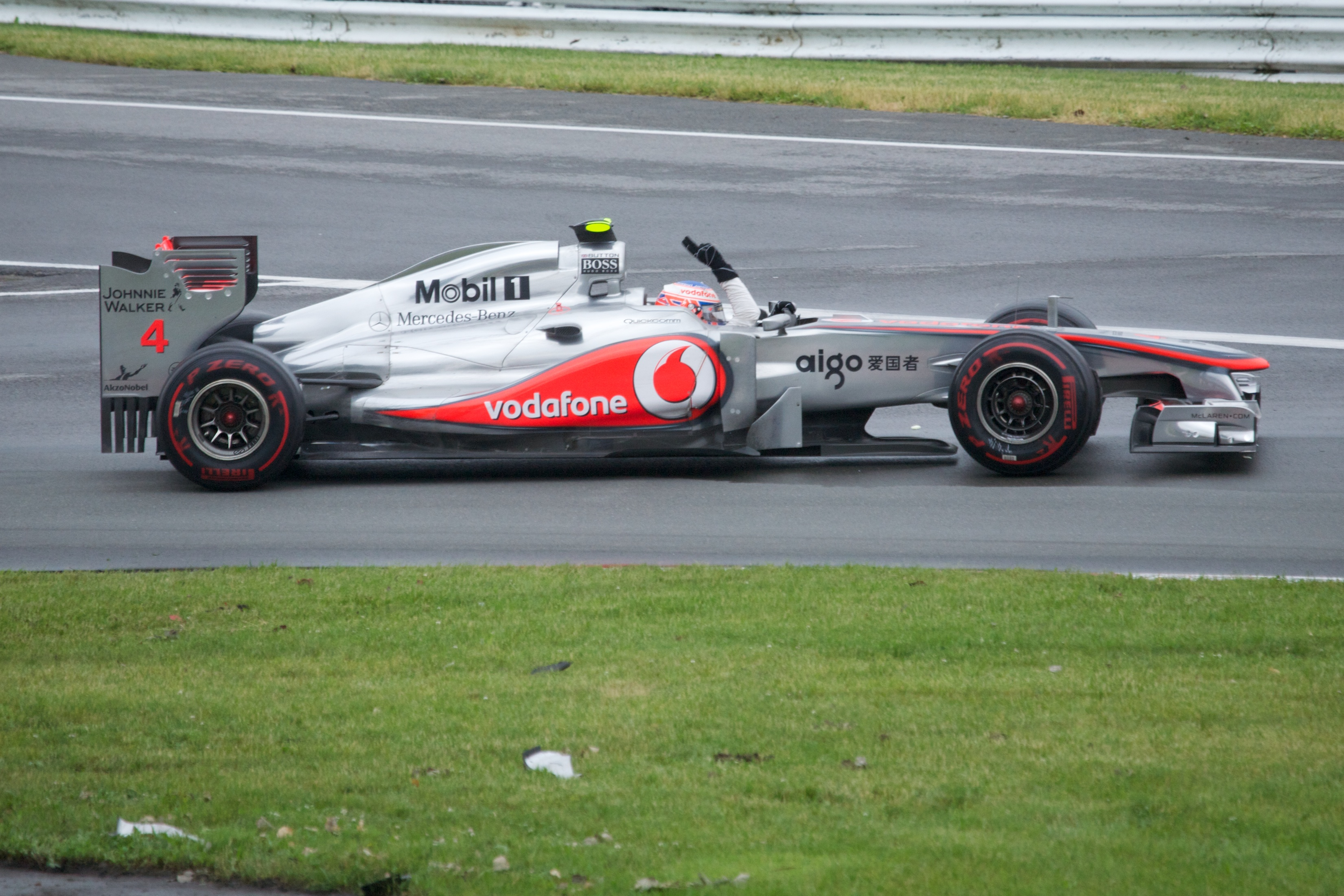
Jenson Button gave the MP4-26 its second Grand Prix victory in a dramatic Canadian Grand Prix; he overtook Vettel on the last lap of the longest race in F1 history.

There was a problem for McLaren in Turkey, when Fernando Alonso's podium ensured that they weren't the only ones fighting to take Vettel and Red Bull off top spot. A disappointing race for the car, a poor pit stop for Hamilton and wrong strategy for Button were only excuses for an underlying lack of pace. This was contrasted by the Spanish Grand Prix, where Alonso's lead in the first stint was converted to fifth and lapped in the pit-stops while McLaren's fast race pace meant that while qualifying was a no-go, they could definitely challenge Red Bull in the race. Hamilton finished the just 0.6 seconds behind winner Vettel and Button completed McLaren's first double podium of 2011. In Monaco it was possible the MP4-26 had the fastest race pace again, but a qualifying error from the team meant Hamilton only started ninth, and his own errors meant he finished sixth. Button however, was on a charge starting second and maintaining it at the first corner. He had superior pace over Vettel and Alonso, who he caught but could not pass in the notorious Monaco circuit; he may have been able to if it had not been for a red flag which allowed them to change tyres, and thus finished third. There was more success for Button though in Canada, winning the longest race in F1 history, in changeable conditions after starting seventh, making five pit stops and serving a drive through, charging through the field from last more than once, pressuring Vettel into a mistake on the last lap to take the lead, enduring a puncture, a collision with team mate Hamilton which ended his race and a two-hour red flag. The victory made McLaren the only team to have both drivers take a victory, up to that point in the season.

In many ways the European Grand Prix was similar to Turkey. Hamilton finished fourth and Button sixth after a difficult race with the car underperforming in the heat. This meant that Vettel now had a massive 77-point lead in the championship after taking 6 victories from 8 races (and finishing second in the other two) and had taken 7 poles from 8 races (and was on the front row on the other race). The British Grand Prix brought new changes in the regulations surrounding the off-throttle blown diffuser. The use of the device was limited and the regulation changes were controversial because they led to different rules for the teams with engines by Renault and those with engines by Mercedes-Benz. Both engine manufacturers claimed that the other had gained an advantage, and full use of the device was promptly reinstated for the German Grand Prix and a complete ban was announced for the 2012 season. During the Silverstone race however, Ferrari who had remained relatively quiet on the matter, had discovered extremely quick race pace and Alonso took victory followed by the two Red Bulls. Hamilton finished the race fourth after starting tenth, and Button took his first retirement of the year when a wheel nut was not properly connected after a pit stop. In Germany, Hamilton had a sensational lap in qualifying to only miss out on pole by five hundreds of a second. He would go on to win the race after overtakes on both Mark Webber and Fernando Alonso; but Button's hydraulics failure meant that both Ferrari and Red Bull took more points away from the race than McLaren. The new-found pace in the colder conditions allowed McLaren to be back on form. After two retirements, Jenson Button was back for his 200th Grand Prix in Hungary. The cold temperature suited the mechanical grip of the McLarens - both getting past Vettel in the first five laps; and the changeable conditions suited Button's calm decision-making skills so that Button could take victory. Hamilton had led before two changes to the wrong tyres, a spin and unintentionally forcing Paul di Resta off the track that caused him to gain a drive-through penalty ruined his podium chances. Vettel was second, Alonso third and Hamilton fourth.

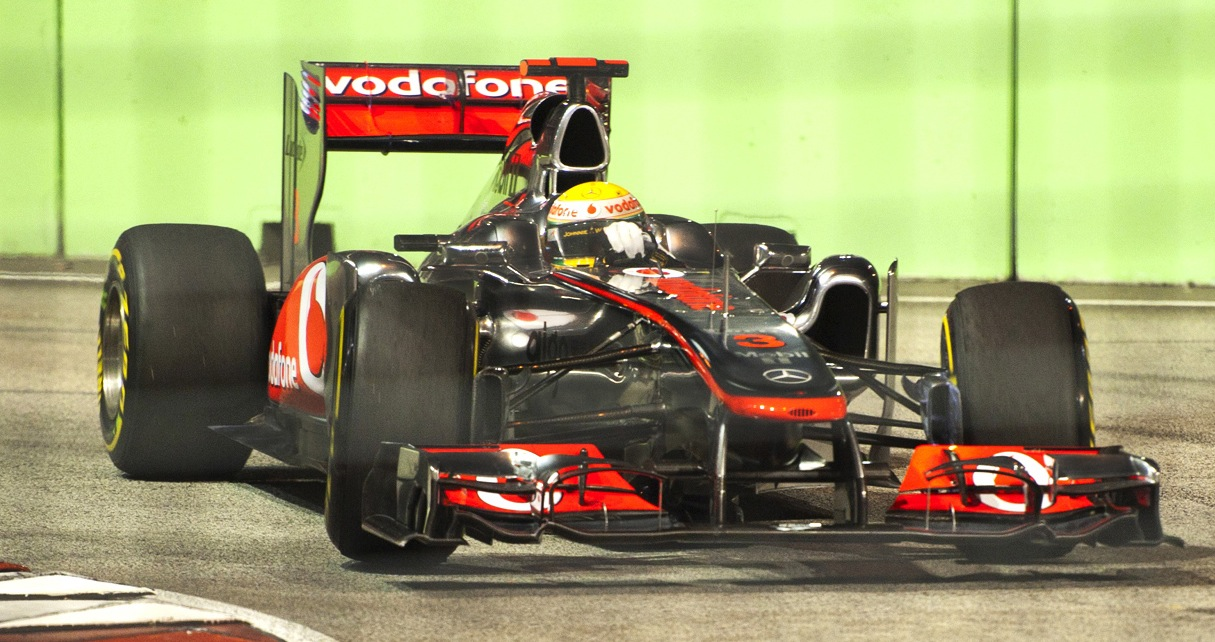
Hamilton at the Singapore Grand Prix

After the Summer break, F1 returned to Spa, home of the Belgian Grand Prix. Hamilton qualified third, and Button qualified thirteenth due to a miscommunication with the team, telling Button to let Hamilton through with not enough time for Button to get back to the start line to begin another flying lap. During the race, Hamilton crashed after a collision with Kamui Kobayashi, whilst Button fought back onto the podium behind a Red Bull 1–2. That result left Vettel with a virtually unassailable 92-point lead. In Monza, Vettel won with a dominant display from pole, at a circuit that was supposed to be one of Red Bull's weakest. Button eventually finished second for the third year in a row, whilst Hamilton finished fourth after spending the majority of the race behind Michael Schumacher. Singapore was Vettel's third race victory in a row and his ninth of the season. With Button finishing second there he elevated himself to second in the championship, becoming the only man who could stop Vettel winning the title. Team mate Hamilton dropped out of contention in Singapore after a third contact of the year with Massa cost him a front wing and a drive through penalty.

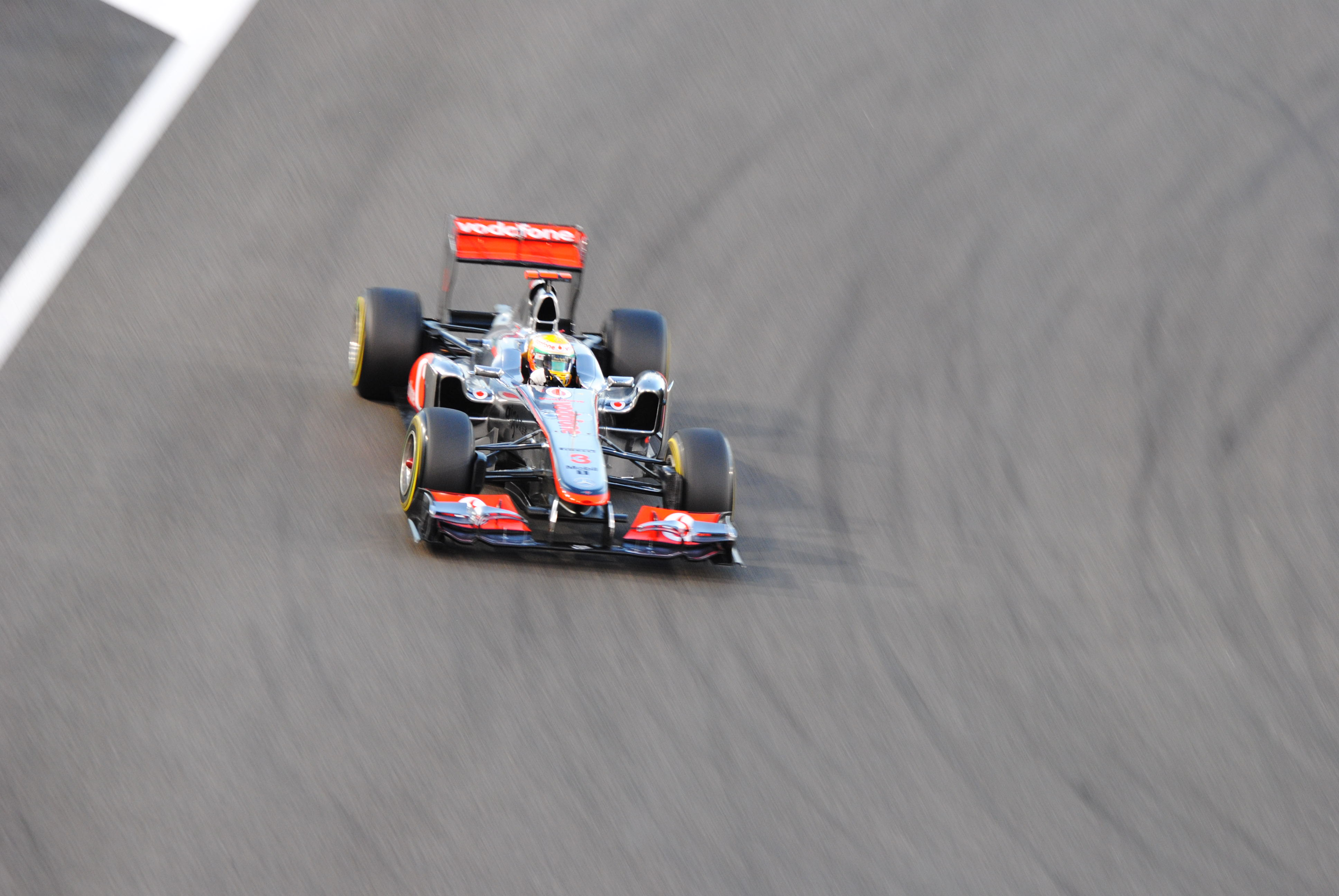
Hamilton took home McLaren's last victory of 2011 at the Abu Dhabi Grand Prix

In Japan, Button took the much improved McLaren to second on the grid – only 0.009 seconds behind Vettel. Button got past Vettel in the second round of pit stops after conserving the tyres through the second stint and staying out longer before pitting and going on to win the race – his first race win in full dry conditions for McLaren. Massa and Hamilton made contact for the fourth time in 2011, at the final chicane, and after a slow pit-stop and a puncture Hamilton dropped from third to fifth in the race. It seemed evident in Japan that the McLarens were extremely competitive, probably the most of all season, and Sebastian Vettel sealing the Drivers' title did nothing to dampen their spirits. In Korea, Hamilton claimed pole position and was the only driver in a car other than a Red Bull to claim pole in 2011 and the first McLaren pole since the 2010 Canadian Grand Prix, but would finish the race in second with Button in fourth. At the Indian Grand Prix, Button finished second, after not being able to match the pace of Vettel, whilst Hamilton collided with Massa and finished seventh. In Abu Dhabi however, Hamilton and Button qualified second and third respectively after being a good match to Red Bull's RB7 in qualifying. Vettel's retirement on the first lap allowed Hamilton to take victory after controlling the race from the lead. Button finished third after losing his KERS for a large proportion of the race. At the season finale, in Brazil, Red Bull occupied the front row whilst both the MP4-26s were on the second row again, with Button out-qualifying Hamilton. Button finished the race in third, behind the two Red Bull drivers, after being overtaken by Alonso at the start, yet repassing him near the end of the race. Hamilton ran in fifth for the majority of the race, before retiring with a gearbox problem.

== Sponsorship and livery ==
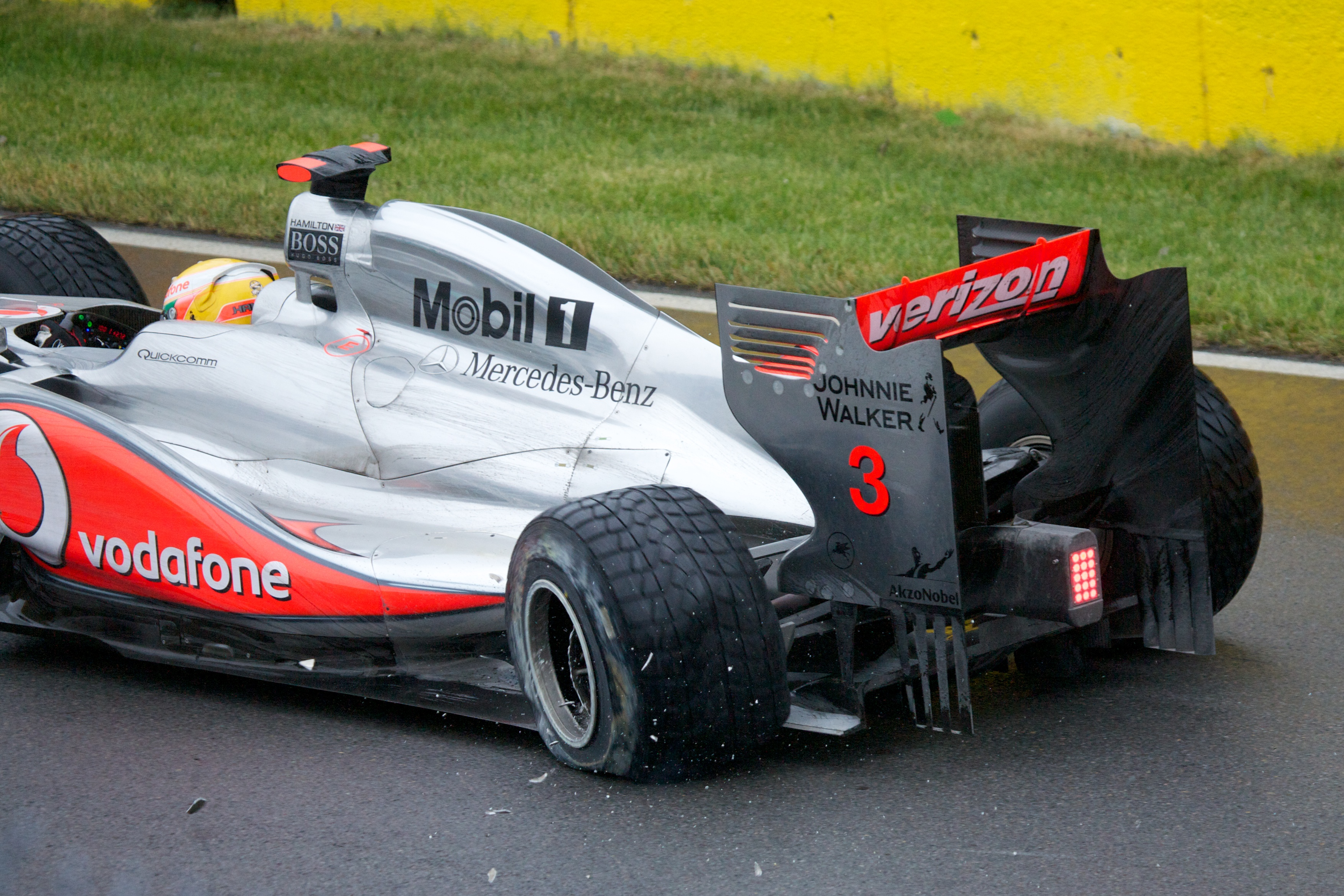
In the Canadian Grand Prix, the MP4-25 features a Verizon co-branding on the rear wing due to Vodafone's 45% stake in the company.

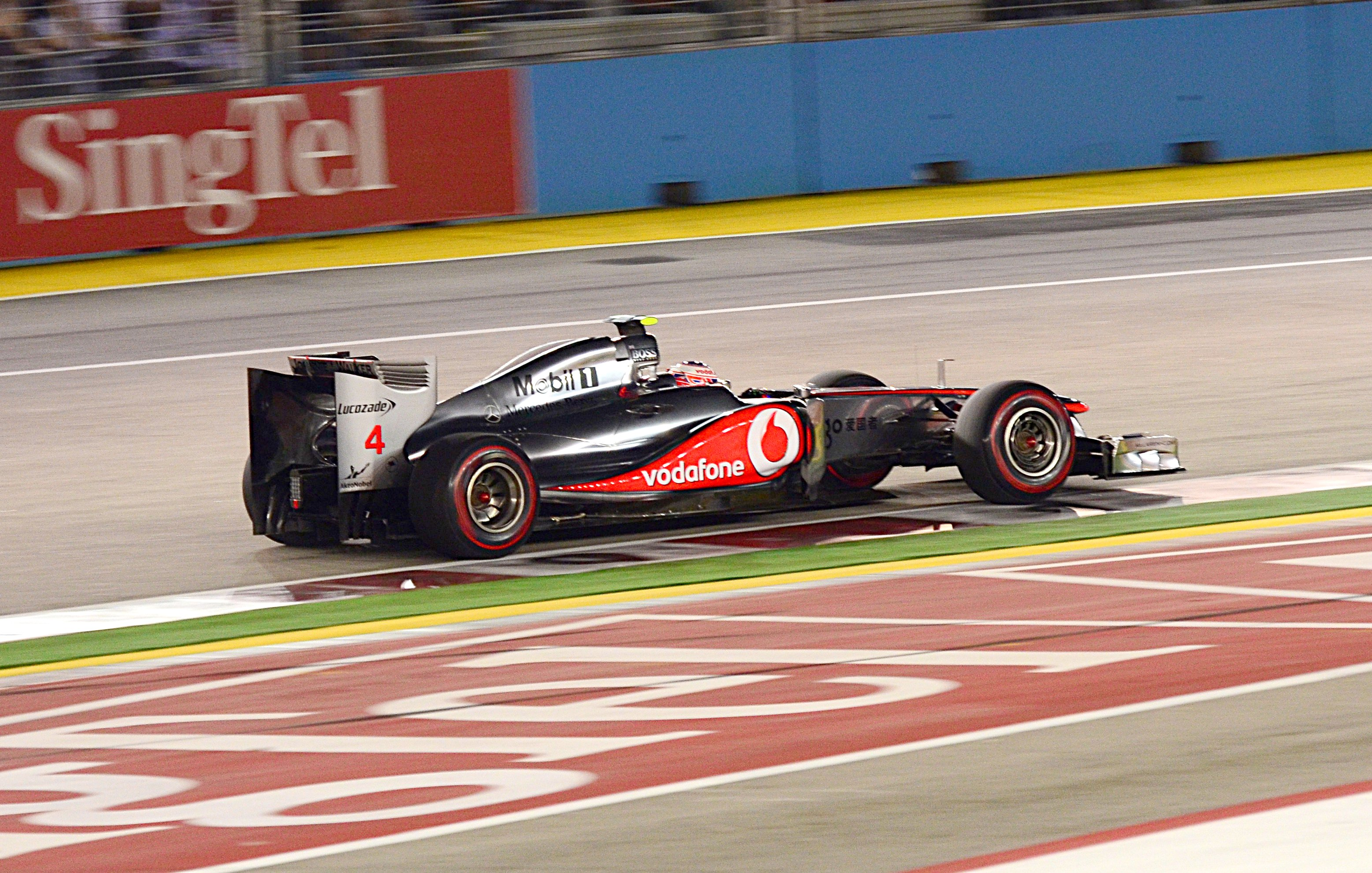
The revised rear wing logo placement following the signing of Lucozade as a new sponsor

The livery was the same as in recent years: metallic grey, accented by the red inserts of the sponsor, Vodafone.

In the Canadian Grand Prix, the featured Verizon co-branding on the rear wing due to Vodafone's 45% stake in the company.

Right before the Singapore Grand Prix, McLaren signed a new sponsor: Lucozade and the logo replaced the Johnnie Walker logo on the sides of the rear wing, thus shifting the Johnnie Walker logo to the back of the rear wing, which changed from red to silver in colour. At the Abu Dhabi Grand Prix, the Johnnie Walker logo on the rear part of the rear wing was replaced by Hilton Honors. At the Turkish Grand Prix, the Johnnie Walker logo was replaced by DrinkiQ.

To celebrate the 30-year partnership between Hugo Boss and McLaren, an international design competition called "Dress Me for the Finale" was held, in which fans could create custom-designed racing suits for the team's drivers, Lewis Hamilton and Jenson Button, to be worn during the third practice session and qualifying on the Saturday of each race weekend.

As part of McLaren’s marketing strategy, the team often leveraged local brands and short-term, country-specific sponsorship agreements during a given nation’s Grand Prix to gain regional exposure, with the sponsors' logos appearing on the sides of the car’s cockpit.

- Australia: DM Shapes
- Turkish: Kovan
- Spanish: Islas Canarias
- Monaco: Verizon
- Canada: Quickcomm
- European: Javi Car
- British: SwimHut
- German: RTL - Wir helfen Kindern
- Hungary: Waberer's
- Belgian: Leudal
- Italian: Frescobaldi
- Singapore: Quickcomm
- India: ABC Consultants

== Drivers' helmets ==
- At the Singapore Grand Prix, Hamilton paid tribute to two motorsport athletes, Martin Hines and Christian Bakkerud, with a special helmet bearing the inscription "R.I.P M.H. & C.B.".
- At the Indian Grand Prix, Hamilton paid tribute to Bob Marley with a special helmet featuring a portrait of Marley on the top, surrounded by Rastafari colors, with a golden design on the back and the phrase "One Love."

== Complete Formula One results ==
(key) (results in bold indicate pole position; results in italics indicate fastest lap)

Year	Entrant	Engine	Tyres	Drivers	1	2	3	4	5	6	7	8	9	10	11	12	13	14	15	16	17	18	19	Points	WCC
2011	Vodafone McLaren Mercedes	Mercedes FO 108Y V8	**P**		AUS	MAL	CHN	TUR	ESP	MON	CAN	EUR	GBR	GER	HUN	BEL	ITA	SIN	JPN	KOR	IND	ABU	BRA	**497**	**2nd**
2011	Vodafone McLaren Mercedes	Mercedes FO 108Y V8	**P**	Hamilton	2	8	1	4	2	6	Ret	4	4	1	4	Ret	4	5	5	**2**	7	1	Ret	**497**	**2nd**
2011	Vodafone McLaren Mercedes	Mercedes FO 108Y V8	**P**	Button	6	2	4	6	3	3	1	6	Ret	Ret	1	3	2	2	1	4	2	3	3	**497**	**2nd**
