= 2011 Formula One World Championship =

Motor racing championship

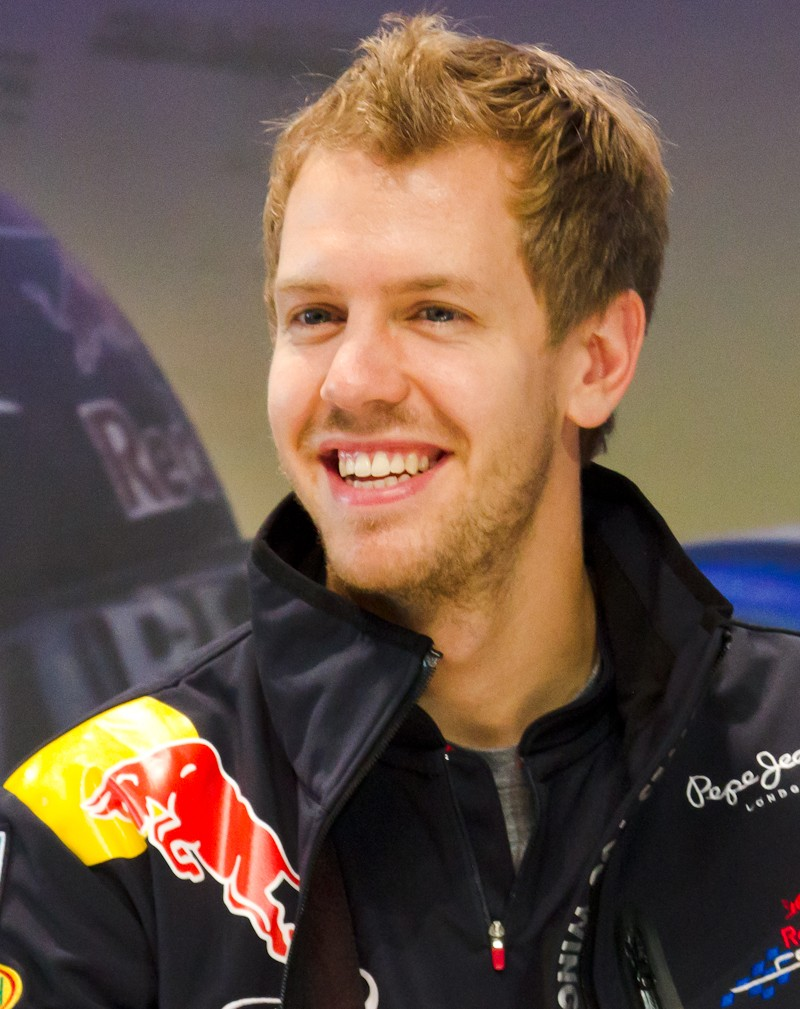
Reigning Champion Sebastian Vettel successfully defended his World Championship, replacing Fernando Alonso as the youngest double World Champion in Formula One history.

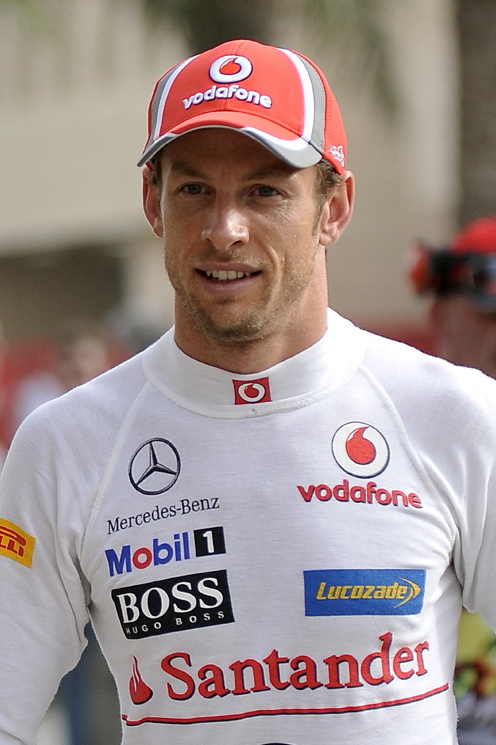
2009 Champion Jenson Button (pictured in 2012) came in second behind Vettel by a then record gap of 122 points.

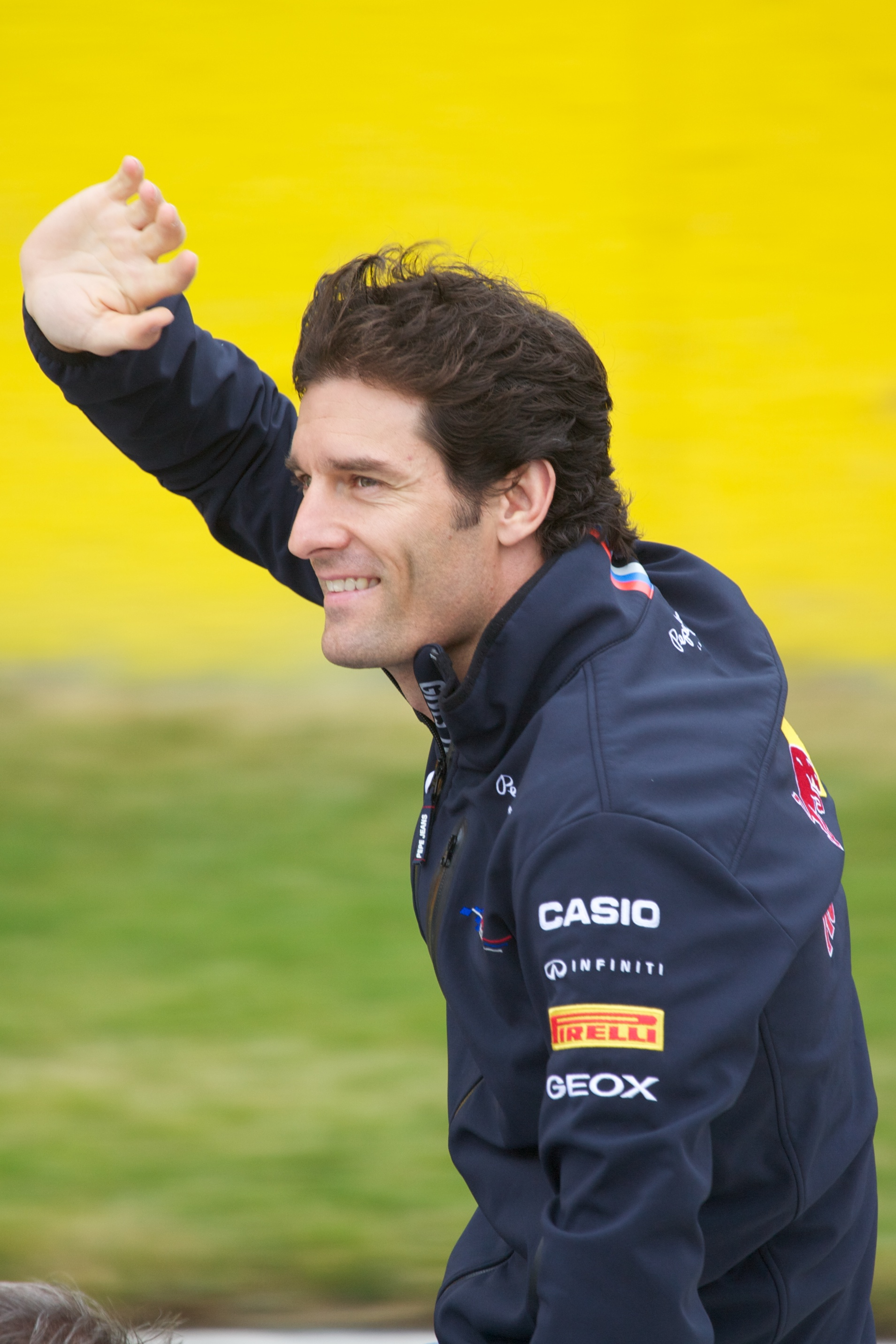
Mark Webber, Vettel's teammate, finished third in the championship for the second season in a row.

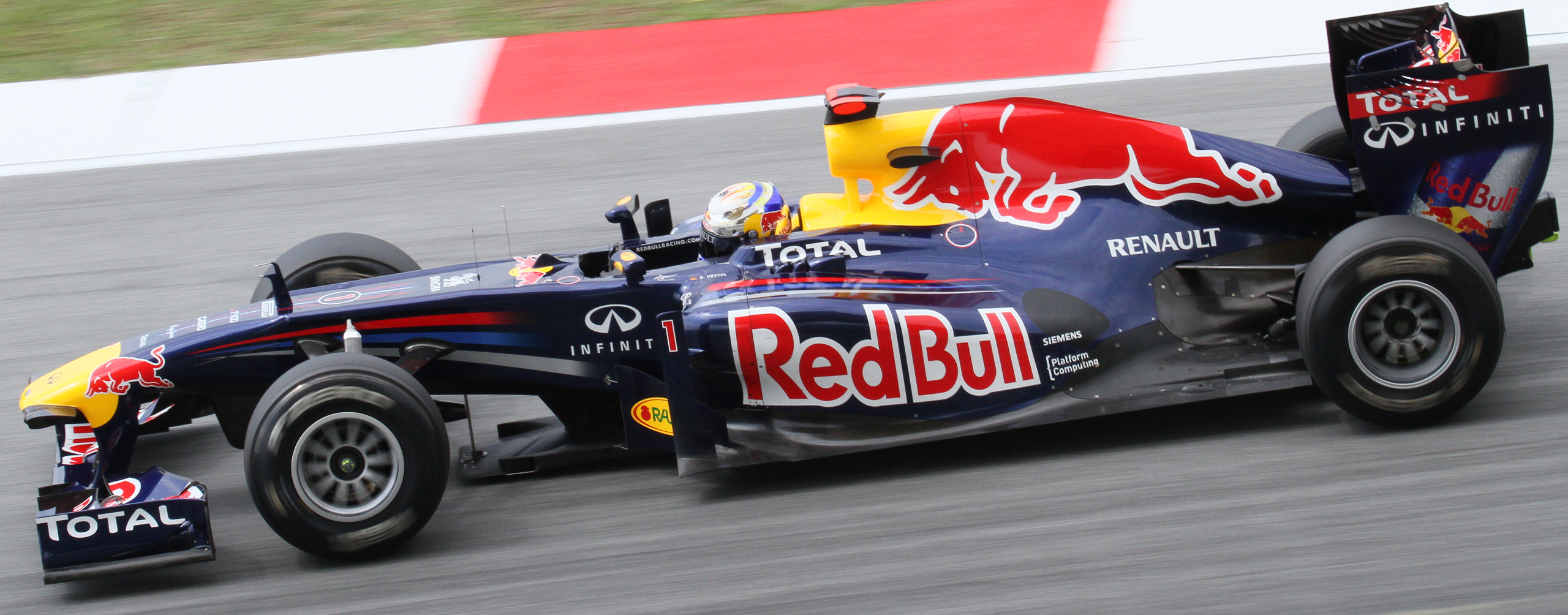
Red Bull won their second World Constructors' Championship with the Red Bull RB7.

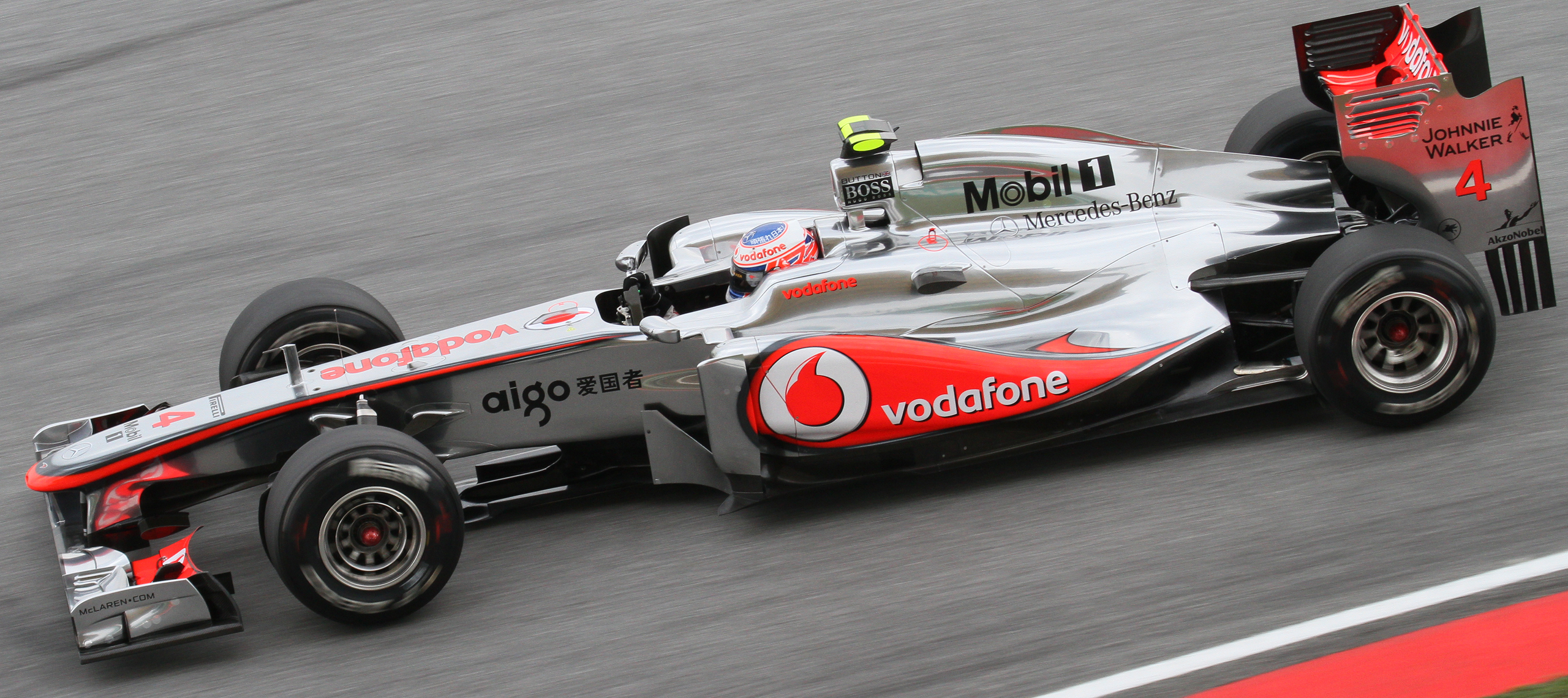
McLaren finished runner-up in the World Constructors' Championship with the McLaren MP4-26.

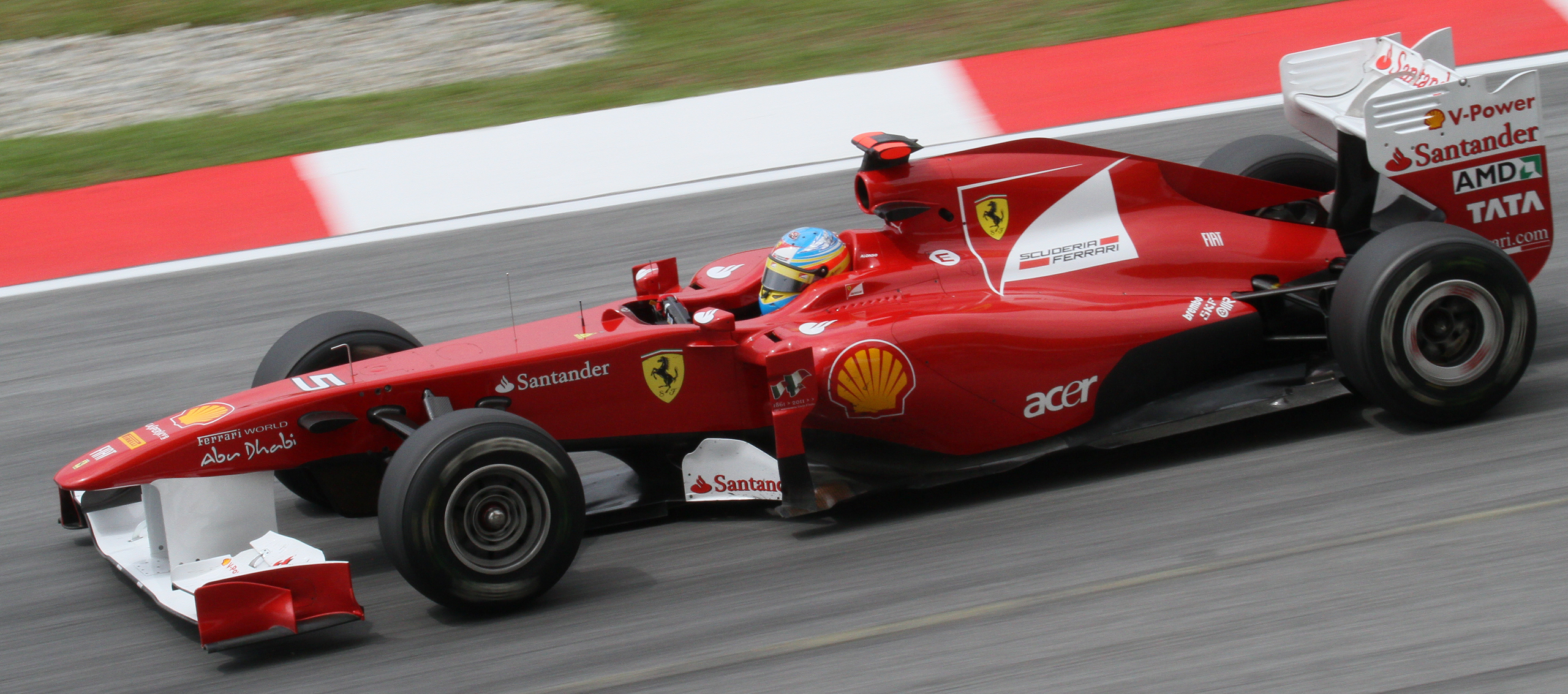
Ferrari finished third in the World Constructors' Championship with the Ferrari 150º Italia.

The 2011 FIA Formula One World Championship was the 65th season of FIA Formula One motor racing. The original calendar for the 2011 Formula One World Championship consisted of twenty rounds, including the inaugural running of the Indian Grand Prix before the cancellation of the Bahrain Grand Prix. Pirelli returned to the sport as tyre supplier for all teams, taking over from Bridgestone, marking their return to Formula One for the first time since the 1991 season.

Red Bull Racing and their driver Sebastian Vettel were the defending Constructors' and Drivers' Champions respectively, Vettel being one of five World Champions appearing on the grid. Vettel defended his World Championship at the 2011 Japanese Grand Prix, becoming the youngest driver, at 24 years and 98 days, to do so while helping Red Bull Racing defend their Constructors' Championship. It would also be the last season for veteran race winner Rubens Barrichello and the first season in which the Drag Reduction System (DRS) overtaking aid was used.

== Teams and drivers ==
After a dispute between the Formula One Teams Association (FOTA) and the FIA in the first half of 2009, a new Concorde Agreement was signed on 1 August 2009 by the then FIA president Max Mosley and all of the existing teams at the time. The new agreement provided for a continuation of the terms of the 1998 agreement, and was to run until 31 December 2012. The FIA published a provisional entry list on 30 November 2010, which was revised on 2 December 2010. All teams competed with tyres supplied by Pirelli.

Entrant	Constructor	Chassis	Engine	No.	Race Drivers	Rounds
(Austria) Red Bull Racing Renault	Red Bull Racing-Renault	RB7	Renault RS27-2011	1	(Germany) Sebastian Vettel	All
(Austria) Red Bull Racing Renault	Red Bull Racing-Renault	RB7	Renault RS27-2011	2	(Australia) Mark Webber	All
(United Kingdom) Vodafone McLaren Mercedes	McLaren-Mercedes	MP4-26	Mercedes FO 108Y	3	(United Kingdom) Lewis Hamilton	All
(United Kingdom) Vodafone McLaren Mercedes	McLaren-Mercedes	MP4-26	Mercedes FO 108Y	4	(United Kingdom) Jenson Button	All
(Italy) Scuderia Ferrari (Note: Ferrari entered first eight Grands Prix as "Scuderia Ferrari Marlboro".)	Ferrari	150º Italia	Ferrari 056	5	(Spain) Fernando Alonso	All
(Italy) Scuderia Ferrari	Ferrari	150º Italia	Ferrari 056	6	(Brazil) Felipe Massa	All
(Germany) Mercedes GP Petronas F1 Team	Mercedes	MGP W02	Mercedes FO 108Y	7	(Germany) Michael Schumacher	All
(Germany) Mercedes GP Petronas F1 Team	Mercedes	MGP W02	Mercedes FO 108Y	8	(Germany) Nico Rosberg	All
(United Kingdom) Lotus Renault GP (Note: Renault competed under a British license.)	Renault	R31	Renault RS27-2011	9	(Germany) Nick Heidfeld	1–11
(United Kingdom) Lotus Renault GP	Renault	R31	Renault RS27-2011	9	(Brazil) Bruno Senna	12–19
(United Kingdom) Lotus Renault GP	Renault	R31	Renault RS27-2011	10	(Russia) Vitaly Petrov	All
(United Kingdom) AT&T Williams	Williams-Cosworth	FW33	Cosworth CA2011K	11	(Brazil) Rubens Barrichello	All
(United Kingdom) AT&T Williams	Williams-Cosworth	FW33	Cosworth CA2011K	12	(Venezuela) Pastor Maldonado	All
Force India F1 Team (Note: Force India entered last four Grands Prix as "Sahara Force India F1 Team".)	Force India-Mercedes	VJM04	Mercedes FO 108Y	14	(Germany) Adrian Sutil	All
Force India F1 Team	Force India-Mercedes	VJM04	Mercedes FO 108Y	15	(United Kingdom) Paul di Resta	All
(Switzerland) Sauber F1 Team	Sauber-Ferrari	C30	Ferrari 056	16	(Japan) Kamui Kobayashi	All
(Switzerland) Sauber F1 Team	Sauber-Ferrari	C30	Ferrari 056	17	(Mexico) Sergio Pérez	All (Note: Sergio Pérez was entered into the Canadian Grand Prix, but withdrew after taking part in free practice.)
(Switzerland) Sauber F1 Team	Sauber-Ferrari	C30	Ferrari 056	17	(Spain) Pedro de la Rosa	7
(Italy) Scuderia Toro Rosso	Toro Rosso-Ferrari	STR6	Ferrari 056	18	(Switzerland) Sébastien Buemi	All
(Italy) Scuderia Toro Rosso	Toro Rosso-Ferrari	STR6	Ferrari 056	19	(Spain) Jaime Alguersuari	All
(Malaysia) Team Lotus	Lotus-Renault	T128	Renault RS27-2011	20	(Finland) Heikki Kovalainen	All
(Malaysia) Team Lotus	Lotus-Renault	T128	Renault RS27-2011	21	(Italy) Jarno Trulli	1–9, 11–19
(Malaysia) Team Lotus	Lotus-Renault	T128	Renault RS27-2011	21	(India) Karun Chandhok	10
(Spain) HRT Formula 1 Team (Note: HRT entered first nine Grands Prix as "Hispania Racing F1 Team".)	HRT-Cosworth	F111	Cosworth CA2011	22	(India) Narain Karthikeyan	1–8, 17
(Spain) HRT Formula 1 Team	HRT-Cosworth	F111	Cosworth CA2011	22	(Australia) Daniel Ricciardo	9–16, 18–19
(Spain) HRT Formula 1 Team	HRT-Cosworth	F111	Cosworth CA2011	23	(Australia) Daniel Ricciardo	17
(Spain) HRT Formula 1 Team	HRT-Cosworth	F111	Cosworth CA2011	23	(Italy) Vitantonio Liuzzi	1–16, 18–19
(Russia) Marussia Virgin Racing	Virgin-Cosworth	MVR-02	Cosworth CA2011	24	(Germany) Timo Glock	All
(Russia) Marussia Virgin Racing	Virgin-Cosworth	MVR-02	Cosworth CA2011	25	(Belgium) Jérôme d'Ambrosio	All

=== Free practice drivers ===
Six constructors entered free practice only drivers over the course of the season.

Drivers that took part in free practice sessions during the 2011 FIA Formula One World Championship
Constructor	Practice drivers	
Constructor	Driver name	Rounds
Force India-Mercedes	(Germany) Nico Hülkenberg	1–5, 7–13, 15, 19
Hispania-Cosworth	(India) Narain Karthikeyan (Czech Republic) Jan Charouz	10, 14–16; 19
Lotus-Renault	(India) Karun Chandhok (Italy) Davide Valsecchi (Brazil) Luiz Razia	1, 4, 8–9, 12–13, 15–17; 2; 3, 19
Renault	(Brazil) Bruno Senna (France) Romain Grosjean	11; 18–19
Toro Rosso-Ferrari	(Australia) Daniel Ricciardo (France) Jean-Éric Vergne	1–8; 16, 18–19
Virgin-Cosworth	(Canada) Robert Wickens	18

=== New entries process ===
Following USF1's inability to make the grid in 2010, the FIA opened a new selection process to find an additional team to occupy the empty slot, as well as possible reserve entrants for the event of other withdrawals. Fifteen entry bids were reported to have been received, including ART Grand Prix, winners of several championships in feeder series; previous 2010 applicants Stefan Grand Prix and World Series by Renault team Epsilon Euskadi; and a joint effort by 1997 World Champion Jacques Villeneuve with Durango, the former Italian GP2 team that had encountered financial difficulties. However, the number of applicants declined, as ART Grand Prix and Cypher, the renamed USF1 operation, withdrew their entries, and the FIA decided ahead of the 2010 Italian Grand Prix that none of the prospective entrants met the minimum funding or engineering requirements, leaving the grid slot vacant.

Following the confirmation that there would be no new additions to the grid for 2011, Joan Villadelprat of Epsilon Euskadi and Jacques Villeneuve of the combined Villeneuve-Durango teams both announced that they would still attempt to join the grid for 2011, exploring the possibilities of taking over an existing team. Villeneuve later admitted to considering possibilities outside of Formula One, including extending his NASCAR Nationwide Series campaign, or moving to Australia to pursue opportunities in the V8 Supercars.

=== Team changes ===
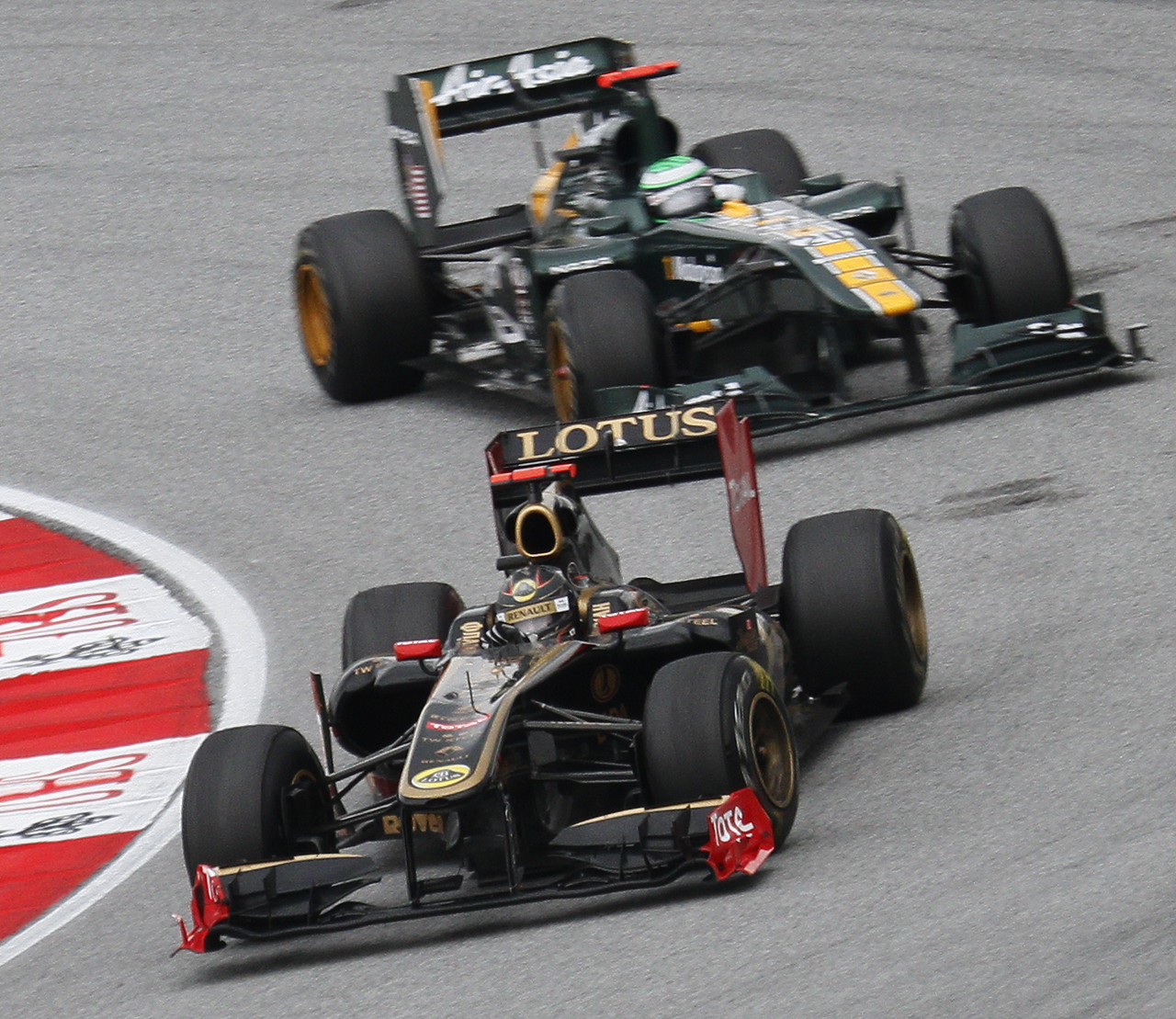
The season started with controversy when two teams using the Lotus name were entered onto the grid, Lotus Renault GP (foreground) and Team Lotus (background).

- At the British Grand Prix, Scuderia Ferrari announced they would remove Marlboro from their official team name in response to what they described as "recent concerns" regarding their association with the tobacco brand.
- In the week before the Korean Grand Prix, Force India announced that the Lucknow-based Sahara India Pariwar conglomerate had purchased a 42.5% stake in the team, giving them co-ownership with team principal Vijay Mallya. The team was subsequently renamed Sahara Force India
- Hispania announced several major partnerships in November 2010. Chief among these was an arrangement that saw Williams supply the Murcia-based team with transmission systems for the 2011 season, whilst forming a partnership with Spanish businessman Juan Villalonga, who was previously affiliated with Minardi as CEO of Telefónica. In July 2011, Thesan Capital, a Madrid-based investment company purchased a controlling stake in the team from owner José Ramón Carabante. Thesan Capital announced the team's operations would continue as they had before the purchase, and that they had no plans to change the team name or alter its operational structure. In a statement released to the media, Thesan Capital described their intentions as making the team "more Spanish" and settling the team within Spain; the team had previously been supported by a complex ownership arrangement that saw team principal Colin Kolles control the physical team, with Carabante owning the rights to the team's entry.
- Lotus Racing team principal Tony Fernandes purchased the rights to the Team Lotus name from David Hunt, with the intention of renaming the team to reflect its historical counterpart for the 2011 season. The use of the Team Lotus name led to a naming dispute with Lotus Cars. The team announced that they had terminated their three-year contract with engine supplier Cosworth; and used Renault engines from 2011.
- On 8 December 2010, Lotus Cars announced a partnership with Renault F1 that saw the British sports car manufacturer become title sponsor of the team, with a view to taking full control over the next few years. Confusion over the exact status over ownership of the team led team principal Éric Boullier to clarify that Genii Capital has full ownership of the team, with former owners Renault retreating to a position as engine supplier. The team was then known as Lotus Renault GP, and the chassis and constructor still known as Renault for reasons related to the Concorde Agreement, similar to Sauber retaining the "BMW Sauber" name in 2010 despite the departure of BMW at the end of 2009. Following team's ownership change, the team also switched their French licence to a British one.
- In March 2011, it was announced that Infiniti, the luxury brand of Japanese car manufacturer Nissan of whom Renault own a 44% stake, would become a major sponsor of Red Bull Racing and thus Red Bull Racing became Renault's official main works partner team and effectively received free engines as well as full-factory support from Renault. However, contradictory to early reports, the arrangement with Infiniti had not extended to an engine re-branding.
- BMW Sauber announced in July 2010 that it will revert to the name Sauber in 2011. The team was forced to retain the BMW naming for 2010 due to issues involving television rights money that would not have been paid had the team changed their name.
- After a Williams demonstration run in Caracas, it was confirmed that Venezuelan state-controlled oil company PDVSA would enter into a long-term sponsorship deal with the team, replacing outgoing sponsors RBS, Philips and AirAsia. AirAsia officially left Williams F1 to concentrate on Team Lotus.
- After sponsoring the team for the 2010 season, Russian sports car manufacturer Marussia acquired what they termed a "significant stake" of Virgin Racing, with the team changing its name to Marussia Virgin Racing. Further reports confirmed that Marussia had purchased a controlling stake in the team, securing their future until 2014. The team split with Wirth Research mid-season after a technical review by former Renault F1 Team engineering director Pat Symonds found that Virgin's CFD-only approach had failed. In the week before the British Grand Prix, Virgin announced a technical partnership with McLaren that granted them access to McLaren's testing facilities as well as the purchase of Wirth Research facilities.

=== Driver changes ===
- DAMS GP2 driver Jérôme d'Ambrosio replaced Lucas di Grassi at Virgin Racing, having previously driven for the team during Friday practice sessions at selected events in 2010. Di Grassi did not have his contract with Virgin Racing renewed. With only a handful of vacant racing seats available ahead of the winter testing period, he announced that would concentrate on a return to the sport in 2012 rather than attempt to secure a seat in 2011.
- DTM champion Paul di Resta replaced Vitantonio Liuzzi at Force India, having previously driven for the team during Friday practice sessions at selected events in 2010.
- Nico Hülkenberg was dropped by Williams on the eve of the 2010 Abu Dhabi Grand Prix. After turning down offers from several teams, including HRT and Virgin, Hülkenberg joined Force India as test and reserve driver. As a part of his arrangement with the team, Hülkenberg drove a VJM04 in the Friday morning free practice session of each Grand Prix.
- Narain Karthikeyan returned to Formula One with Hispania after last racing with Jordan Grand Prix in 2005, which was run at the time by Hispania team principal Colin Kolles. Karthikeyan also collaborated with Kolles on an unsuccessful attempt at the 2009 24 Hours of Le Mans, and he competed in the 2010 NASCAR Camping World Truck Series in a limited campaign. He also competed in an A1GP season for India.
- Robert Kubica was injured while competing in the Ronde di Andora rally during the winter off-season, leaving him with multiple fractures to his arm, hand and leg. The nature of his injuries were serious enough to prevent him from starting the season, while the surgeon who operated on Kubica has said that his recovery could take up to an entire year. His former BMW Sauber teammate Nick Heidfeld was later confirmed as his replacement at Lotus Renault GP.
- After being released from his contract with Force India one year in advance of its expiration, Vitantonio Liuzzi officially joined Hispania Racing as their second driver at the final test of the season, filling the last vacant racing seat on the grid. As a result of this, Hispania's part-time racing drivers Karun Chandhok, Christian Klien and Sakon Yamamoto were all unable to secure contracts to race.
- 2010 GP2 Series champion Pastor Maldonado was signed by Williams after testing for the team in the young driver tests in Abu Dhabi.
- Sergio Pérez, runner-up in the GP2 Series for Barwa Addax, was signed by Sauber to partner Kamui Kobayashi. His signing coincided with the announcement of a partnership between Carlos Slim's telecommunications group Telmex and the Sauber team. Pérez would become the first Mexican driver to race in Formula One since Héctor Rebaque last raced for Brabham at the 1981 Caesars Palace Grand Prix.
- Bruno Senna left Hispania Racing after a single season. Comments made by team principal Colin Kolles suggested that the nephew of three-time World Champion Ayrton Senna had a strained relationship with the team. Senna was later confirmed to have joined Lotus Renault GP as a part of their test and reserve team, and is the first in line to take over driving duties should either of the team's established drivers be unable to race.
- Sakon Yamamoto moved from Hispania Racing as a full-time driver to become a test driver for Virgin Racing for the first three races after he was unable to secure a contract to continue racing with Hispania.

Mid-season changes

- Pedro de la Rosa replaced Sergio Pérez at the Canadian Grand Prix due to Pérez feeling unwell after the first practice session, following a heavy crash at the previous round in Monaco.
- On 30 June, Hispania Racing announced that Australian Daniel Ricciardo – at the time testing and reserve driver for Scuderia Toro Rosso and racing for ISR in the Formula Renault 3.5 Series – would be replacing Narain Karthikeyan for the remainder of the 2011 season in what was described as an audition for a future race seat with Scuderia Toro Rosso.
- Karun Chandhok returned to Formula One, replacing Jarno Trulli at Team Lotus for the German Grand Prix, having previously fulfilled a Friday testing role in Melbourne, Istanbul, Valencia and Silverstone. Chandhok's last race meeting had been the 2010 British Grand Prix when he raced for Hispania. Trulli returned to the car for the Hungarian Grand Prix.
- On 24 August, it was announced that Bruno Senna would replace Nick Heidfeld at Renault for the Belgian and Italian Grands Prix, leading to uncertainty over the status of the seat from the Singapore Grand Prix onwards. The team cited Heidfeld's failure to deliver speed to take on the role of a strong leader as the reason for his dismissal, rather than financial reasons. Renault indicated that they wished for Senna to race for the rest of the season, but "legal issues" threatened Senna's contract with the team. On 2 September, Renault confirmed that Heidfeld's contract had been legally terminated and Senna would drive alongside Vitaly Petrov for the remainder of the season.
- Narain Karthikeyan returned to Hispania for the Indian Grand Prix, replacing Daniel Ricciardo in the 22 car which meant Ricciardo replaced Liuzzi in the 23 car. Liuzzi returned to the team for the Abu Dhabi Grand Prix.

== Calendar ==
On 16 April 2010, Bernie Ecclestone confirmed that there would be twenty races in 2011; all the races from the 2010 season and the addition of the Indian Grand Prix. A provisional calendar was announced on 8 September 2010, which was confirmed on 3 November 2010. This was later revised to nineteen races with the postponement and later cancellation of the Bahrain Grand Prix.

Round	Grand Prix	Circuit	Date
1	Australian Grand Prix	(Australia) Albert Park Circuit, Melbourne	27 March
2	Malaysian Grand Prix	(Malaysia) Sepang International Circuit, Kuala Lumpur	10 April
3	Chinese Grand Prix	(China) Shanghai International Circuit, Shanghai	17 April
4	Turkish Grand Prix	(Turkey) Istanbul Park, Istanbul	8 May
5	Spanish Grand Prix	(Spain) Circuit de Catalunya, Montmeló	22 May
6	Monaco Grand Prix	Circuit de Monaco, Monte Carlo	29 May
7	Canadian Grand Prix	(Canada) Circuit Gilles Villeneuve, Montreal	12 June
8	European Grand Prix	(Spain) Valencia Street Circuit, Valencia	26 June
9	British Grand Prix	(United Kingdom) Silverstone Circuit, Silverstone	10 July
10	German Grand Prix	(Germany) Nürburgring, Nürburg	24 July
11	Hungarian Grand Prix	(Hungary) Hungaroring, Mogyoród	31 July
12	Belgian Grand Prix	(Belgium) Circuit de Spa-Francorchamps, Stavelot	28 August
13	Italian Grand Prix	(Italy) Autodromo Nazionale Monza, Monza	11 September
14	Singapore Grand Prix	Marina Bay Street Circuit, Singapore	25 September
15	Japanese Grand Prix	(Japan) Suzuka Circuit, Suzuka	9 October
16	Korean Grand Prix	(South Korea) Korea International Circuit, Yeongam	16 October
17	Indian Grand Prix	(India) Buddh International Circuit, Greater Noida	30 October
18	Abu Dhabi Grand Prix	(United Arab Emirates) Yas Marina Circuit, Abu Dhabi	13 November
19	Brazilian Grand Prix	(Brazil) Autódromo José Carlos Pace, São Paulo	27 November

=== Calendar changes ===
- The Yas Marina Circuit was to be reconfigured for the Abu Dhabi Grand Prix following heavy criticism over a lack of overtaking in the 2010 race. The organisers of the race elected to postpone the circuit modifications for one year in the face of rule changes – the introduction of Pirelli tyres and the Drag reduction system – that they felt directly addressed the criticisms levelled at the circuit.
- The Bahrain Grand Prix was originally scheduled to be the opening race of the season on 13 March, but was called off by the organisers in light of anti-government protests in the country. A final decision on whether the race was to be rescheduled for later in the year or cancelled outright had to be made by 3 June. At this meeting the World Motor Sport Council (WMSC) voted unanimously to reinstate the race to the calendar, rescheduling it for 30 October 2011. The inaugural Indian Grand Prix would have moved to be the final race of the season in December to accommodate the change. However, the Formula One Teams Association (FOTA) opposed the rescheduling. One week after the WMSC voted to return the race to the calendar, organisers for the Bahrain Grand Prix officially abandoned their bid to return to the calendar. The Indian Grand Prix was restored to its original date.
- The German Grand Prix moved from the Hockenheimring to the Nürburgring, in keeping with the event-sharing arrangement between the two circuits.
- The 2011 season saw the addition of the Indian Grand Prix to the calendar. Originally known as the Jaypee Group Circuit, the venue was officially renamed the Buddh International Circuit in April 2011. Airtel was subsequently announced as title sponsor for the inaugural race.
- The Malaysian Grand Prix changed its name to the Malaysia Grand Prix as part of efforts to promote the country.

=== Testing venues and dates ===
Test	Circuit	Event	Session Timings		Dates	
Test	Circuit	Event	Morning	Afternoon	Start	End
1	Pre Season Test	(Spain) Circuit Ricardo Tormo, Valencia	8:00am–12:00pm	1:00pm–5:00pm	1 February	3 February
2	Pre Season Test	(Spain) Circuito Permanente de Jerez, Jerez de la Frontera	8:00am–12:00pm	1:00pm–5:00pm	10 February	13 February
3	Pre Season Test	(Spain) Circuit de Catalunya, Montmeló	8:00am–12:00pm	1:00pm–5:00pm	18 February	21 February
4	Pre Season Test	Bahrain International Circuit, Sakhir	8:00am–12:00pm	1:00pm–5:00pm	3 March	6 March
5	Young Drivers Test	(United Arab Emirates) Yas Marina Circuit, Abu Dhabi	9:00am–1:00pm	2:00pm–6:00pm	15 November	17 November

== Regulation changes ==
=== Technical regulations ===
- Sole tyre partner Bridgestone announced that it would not renew its contract with Formula One at the end of the 2010 season. After spending three seasons as an official tyre partner for both Grand-Am Rolex Sports Car Series and World Rally Championship auto racing tournaments respectively from 2008 to 2010, Pirelli was officially chosen as the tyre partner for 2011 by the FIA World Motor Sport Council. The Pirelli logo on each tyre was colour-coded to identify each compound and tread pattern being used. Cars had a mandatory weight distribution to provide Pirelli with a technical specification, and preventing teams making changes to the internal configuration of their cars should they prove not to suit the cars. At the final test in Barcelona, it was revealed that drivers would need to make three pit stops at most races, in line with Pirelli's mandate to design a higher wearing tyre.
  - The Belgian Grand Prix saw a small controversy when several teams discovered their tyres had blistered during qualifying, but were not permitted to change their tyres ahead of the race because the damage was the result of the car set-up rather than an accident. Pirelli pointed to Red Bull Racing's practice of running camber settings that were outside their recommended parameters as the cause of the blistering, and said they would be more cautious with their recommendations for Monza to prevent the problem from arising again. Pirelli stated that they were willing to turn to the FIA to enforce camber limits if there was any evidence of blistering after the Free Practice sessions in Italy. The FIA later announced that Pirelli's camber limits were mandatory and that any team who failed to observe them would be reported to the stewards under Article 2.3 of the sport's technical regulations for dangerous construction and would risk exclusion from the race.
- The maximum height of the diffuser was cut from 175 millimetres (6.9 in) to 125 millimetres (4.9 in) and the double diffuser designs, introduced in the 2009 season, were excluded, in order to reduce aerodynamic downforce and turbulent air. Banned with this are double exhaust-blown diffusers, which use exhaust gases re-routed over the diffuser to increase downforce, although single blown diffusers are still allowed. Controversy emerged over the use of "off-throttle blown diffusers" early in the season, with the FIA first banning the concept and then repealing the ban pending discussion with the teams. The off-throttle blown diffuser increases downforce by keeping the engine spinning while the car is under braking, channelling hot exhaust gasses over the diffuser and allowing for higher cornering speeds. The FIA announced that the ban would be reintroduced from the British Grand Prix, limiting the amount of throttle that can be applied during braking. Tighter restrictions were to be introduced for the 2012 season. At the European Grand Prix – two weeks before the British Grand Prix – a further ban was introduced, prohibiting teams from using "extreme" engine maps in qualifying that they would not normally use in races, effectively forcing teams to use the same engine maps in both qualifying and the race. The FIA estimated that the clampdown on extreme engine maps would cost some teams up to half a second per lap in qualifying alone. The mid-season ban was later repealed when several teams applied for concessions to the ban, which were granted and subsequently revoked following protests from other teams. An agreement signed after the British Grand Prix abandoned the ban for the 2011 season entirely, restoring the pre-Valencia rules.

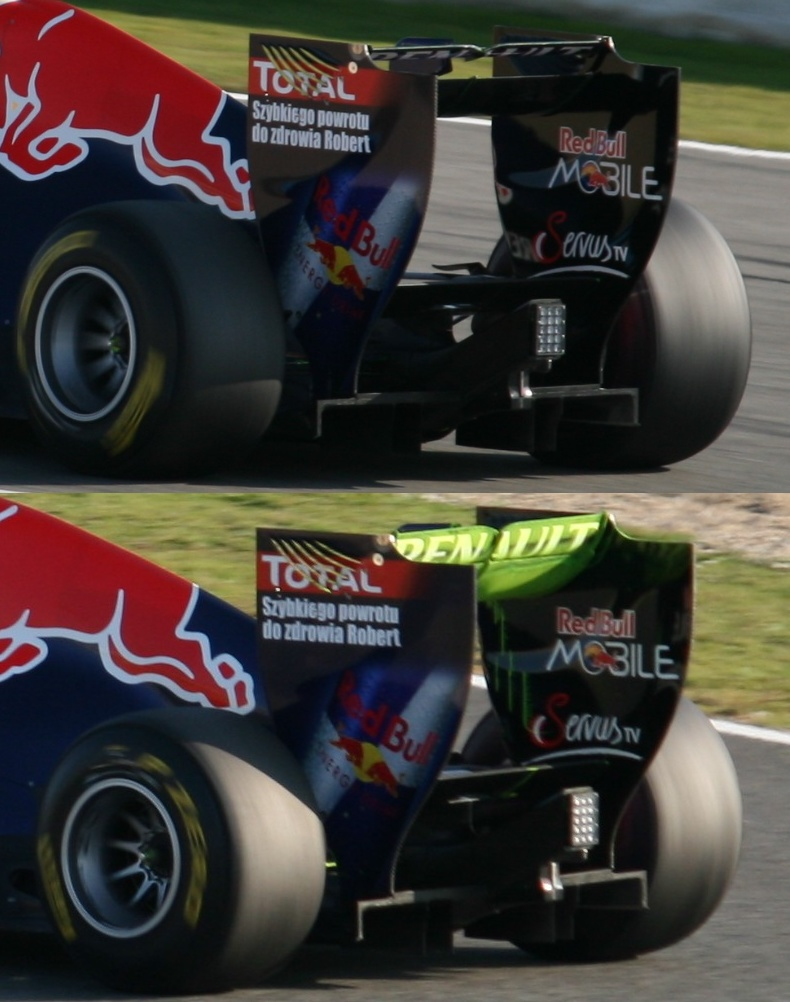
Red Bull RB7 rear wing showing function of Drag reduction system

- The "F-duct" system developed by McLaren and copied by other teams was banned, as the system relying on drivers blocking a gap in the cockpit was judged unsafe. The Drag reduction system (DRS), an adjustable rear wing designed to increase straight line speed, was introduced in the 2011 rules. The system operates under a similar principle to the "F-duct", and is designed to aid overtaking by negating all downforce flowing over the rear wing. The rules dictate that the DRS is only available to a driver within one second of the car in front on a marked designated area of the circuit, after the first two laps of a race. Use of the DRS is unlimited in free practice and qualifying, but prohibited in wet conditions. The system is expected to offer drivers an additional 15 km/h (9.3 mph) when passing, and deactivates when the driver first touches the brakes after using the rear wing. At the Spanish Grand Prix, the FIA announced plans for a secondary DRS zone to be included on a circuit from the Canadian Grand Prix onwards.
- The number of wheel tethers – the load-bearing cables connecting the wheel hubs to the bodywork – was doubled for 2011, in response to an increasing number of accidents where wheels have been torn free of their mountings, including the death of Henry Surtees in a Formula Two race at Brands Hatch in 2009.
- Several smaller aerodynamic devices introduced for 2010 were also banned, including aerodynamic wheel spokes, flexible front splitters designed to lower front ride height, and modifications to the monocoque that create a V-shaped channel running the length of the car's nose. The maximum aspect ratio of the "bladed" rollbar structure – pioneered by Mercedes to decrease the obstruction of air to the rear wing – was also reduced. The 2011 Lotus T128 and Force India VJM04 cars were both launched with a similar device, based on the same principle as the Mercedes device, but the Lotus and Force India variants are legal under the rules because the blade structure is thicker than the one developed by Mercedes.
- KERS units were optional for all teams, after not being utilised in 2010 following a team agreement banning the devices, and the minimum car weight increases from 620 kilograms (1,367 lb) to 640 kilograms (1,411 lb), compensating for the extra weight required. Gearboxes must also last for five races instead of four, with an additional gearbox available without penalty for the purposes of completing an event.

=== Sporting regulations ===
- 2011 saw the return of the 107% rule in qualifying. Under this arrangement, any driver who fails to set a time within 107% of the fastest lap in Q1 may not be permitted to take part in the race; for instance, if the fastest lap is 1 minute 40 seconds (100 seconds), a driver must set a time faster than 1 minute 47 seconds (107 seconds) in order to make it to the grid. However, if a driver who fails to set an appropriate lap time can show cause for his inclusion in the race – for example, if a driver failed to set a lap time in qualifying due to a mechanical fault, but had previously set a lap time within 107% of the pole-sitter's time in free practice – the stewards may allow that driver to take part in the race.
- The ban on team orders – the practice of teams ordering a driver to follow instructions that would be advantageous to their teammate (for example, ordering them to move aside and allow their teammate to pass them) – was lifted after the 2010 German Grand Prix, with the practice to be "regulated" on the race track. The practice of coding instructions to conceal the nature of the order would be banned to prevent deception to the spectators and stewards. The FIA increased the maximum allowable penalty which racing stewards can issue to teams from $100,000 to $250,000.
- At the Hungarian Grand Prix, the FIA introduced new software to track the cars in order to better spot racing incidents and provide the stewards with real-time information about drivers breaking rules. The software was introduced in response to an incident at the German Grand Prix that saw Sébastien Buemi and Nick Heidfeld collide on the tenth lap of the Grand Prix, ending Heidfeld's race, but no penalty was issued to Buemi until after the race had ended.
- The FIA tightened its driving standards, moving to prevent overly aggressive driving and driving beyond the boundaries of the circuit to gain an advantage by implementing stricter penalties for drivers observed to be doing so. Drivers are limited in the number of blocking moves they can make on track, to allow easier overtaking.
  - At the Korean Grand Prix, the FIA announced plans to introduce a stricter version of the "one move" defensive driver rule, in light of a protracted on-track battle between Michael Schumacher and Lewis Hamilton at the Italian Grand Prix. Under the original set of rules, a defending driver would be entitled to make one move across the circuit to select their racing line into an approaching corner; under the regulations introduced for the Korean Grand Prix, a defending driver would be obligated to leave enough space – defined as "one car's width" – on the outside of a corner for an attacking driver to occupy, preventing the defending driver from forcing his rival off the circuit.
  - Further rule amendments granted greater powers to the race stewards. This was reported as a response to a series of on-track incidents involving Lewis Hamilton that culminated in several drive-through penalties; Hamilton received six driver penalties over the course of the 2011 season, setting a new record for the most penalties in a season. From the Korean Grand Prix on, the stewards had the power to issue reprimands alongside penalties, with a grid penalty being awarded after three reprimands.
- A curfew was implemented for team personnel, barring them from accessing the circuit in the nine hours before the first session of the day The rule was introduced following concerns over mechanics spending all night in the pit garage before spending the day in the busy pit lane, with four exceptions allowed for the season. In the event that this rule is broken after all four exceptions have been used, both cars for the offending team must start the race from pit lane. The rule attracted criticism at the Singapore Grand Prix when several teams inadvertently broke curfew, using up one of their four exceptions when members of the teams' marketing divisions arrived early at the circuit.
- Team members deemed to be in key roles were required to undergo accreditation for a "competitors' staff licence" in order to maintain their positions within their teams. This is seen as a reaction to the actions of disgraced former Renault team principal Flavio Briatore at the controversial 2008 Singapore Grand Prix and applies to key staff in all FIA-sanctioned World Championships including Formula One.

== Pre-season ==
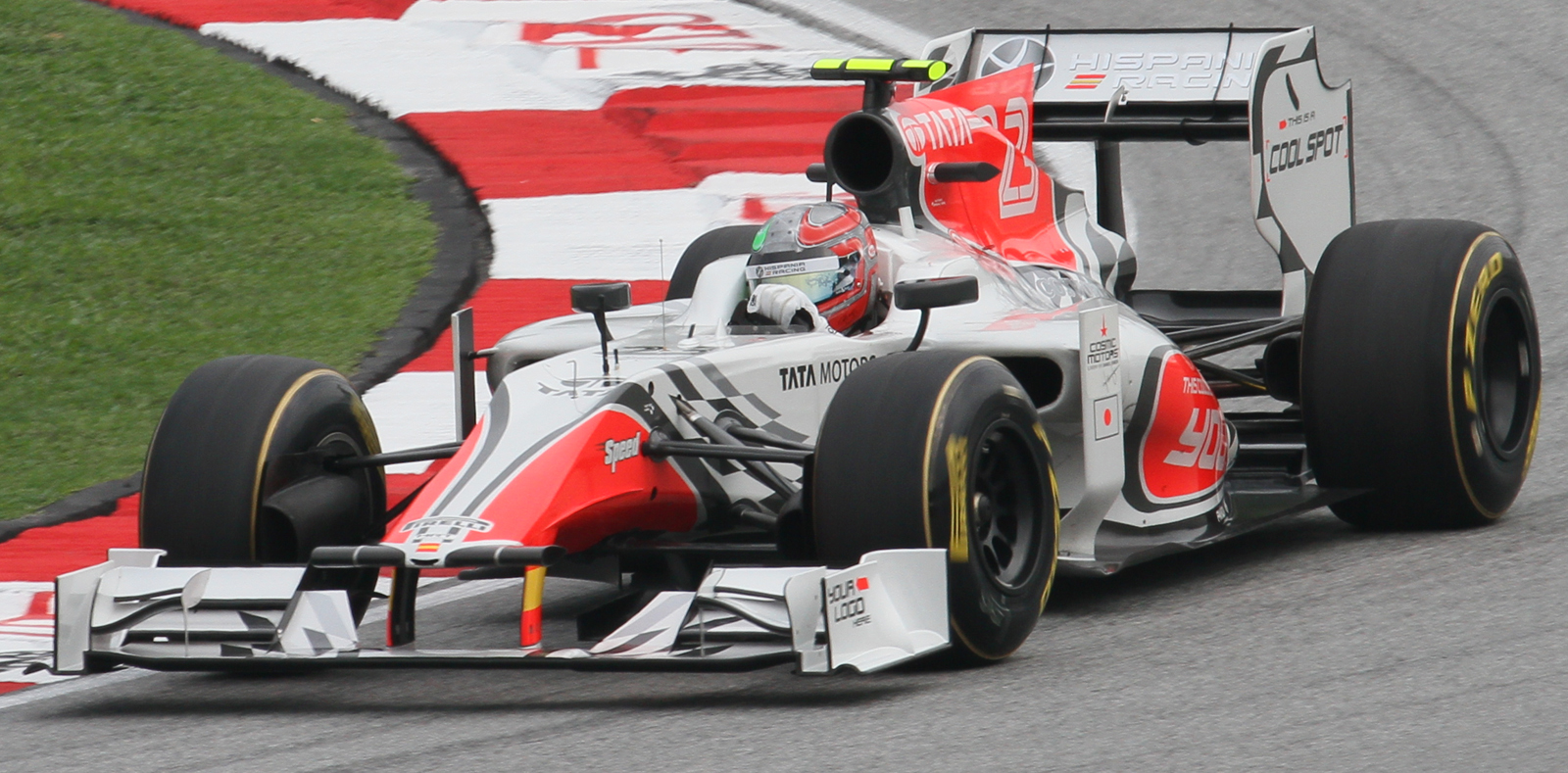
Hispania Racing hired Daniel Simon, a Hollywood concept car designer, to design the F111's livery

The pre-season testing season began immediately after the 2010 Abu Dhabi Grand Prix with a three-day 'Young Driver Test' (for drivers with fewer than three Formula One race starts to their name) at the Yas Marina Circuit. Formula Renault 3.5 runner-up Daniel Ricciardo consistently set the fastest times over the three days, driving for new champions Red Bull Racing.

The Young Driver Tests were followed by another testing session – also held at Yas Marina – for the teams to test the tyres developed by new tyre supplier Pirelli. Ferrari's Felipe Massa was the fastest during the tests, with many drivers declaring their satisfaction with the new tyres, particularly given Pirelli's short development window. Sebastian Vettel experienced an explosive puncture on the final day, though an investigation by Pirelli attributed the incident to debris on the circuit rather than a critical error with the build of the tyre.

The final test of the season was originally scheduled to be held in Bahrain, but was cancelled by the Bahraini Crown Prince due to a political uprising in the island nation. It was instead rescheduled to the Circuit de Catalunya in Barcelona from 8–12 March.

== Report ==
Defending World Champion Sebastian Vettel won the opening race of the season in Melbourne after qualifying on pole position by eight-tenths of a second. Lewis Hamilton finished in second place, and Russian driver Vitaly Petrov attained his maiden podium in third, with Renault hailing his dramatic off-season turn-around after a difficult debut season in 2010. At the opposite end of the grid, the Hispania F111 cars driven by Narain Karthikeyan and Vitantonio Liuzzi both failed to qualify as their qualifying times were both outside 107% of Vettel's fastest time in the first qualifying session. The Saubers of Sergio Pérez and Kamui Kobayashi were disqualified for a technical infringement when their cars failed a post-race scrutineering inspection.

Vettel continued his title defence in Malaysia, taking pole from Hamilton in the dying moments of the session by just one tenth of a second. Vettel went on to win the race by three seconds from Jenson Button, who also claimed second place in the points standings; with two wins, Vettel left Malaysia with twice as many points as the McLaren driver. Nick Heidfeld took Renault's second successive podium and Fernando Alonso made a mistake, making contact with Lewis Hamilton and forcing him to pit for a new front wing, and costing him a potential podium. Hamilton himself slipped down the order after changing to the harder prime tyres and struggling with grip.

Vettel once again took pole in China, whilst teammate Webber made a poor tyre choice and was eliminated from the first qualifying period for the first time since the 2009 Bahrain Grand Prix. Vettel made a poor start in the race and was quickly overcome by the McLarens of Button and Hamilton. Button and Vettel pitted together, but Button made a bizarre mistake, mistakenly pulling up in the Red Bull pits, and allowing Vettel to get back out onto the circuit in front of him. The lead changed several times as the race progressed before Vettel settled into position, but on deteriorating tyres, he was caught and passed by Hamilton four laps from the end. Having started in eighteenth position, Mark Webber recovered to achieve the third podium place.

Sebastian Vettel earned his fourth pole of the season in Turkey, becoming the first person to start the first four races on pole since Mika Häkkinen in 1999. Vettel led the race from the lights to the flag, ahead of Mark Webber and Fernando Alonso, who gained Ferrari's first podium finish of the year. McLaren struggled with a series of slow pit stops, whilst the promise shown by Mercedes in qualifying was lost in the race when their cars were fuel-heavy and running on the harder prime tyre compound.

Mark Webber ended Vettel's run of consecutive pole positions at the Spanish Grand Prix, but it was fourth-starting Fernando Alonso that led the field into the first corner and through much of the early phase of the race. He was eventually overtaken in the pits by Vettel, and slipped down the order to finish a lap behind as Ferrari struggled with Pirelli's brand-new "extra hard" compound, which was specifically designed for endurance, but was two seconds per lap slower than the softer compounds used. Vettel went on to win the race, but Red Bull's one-second advantage in qualifying was gone by the race as Lewis Hamilton spent most of the final stint within one second of the lead. After making a poor start and slipping down to tenth place, Jenson Button used a three-stop strategy to recover to third place.

The Monaco Grand Prix was marred by a string of accidents throughout the weekend that saw two drivers hospitalised; Sergio Pérez crashed heavily at the Nouvelle Chicane in the final qualifying period and suffered a concussion, while Vitaly Petrov was briefly knocked unconscious in a five-car pile-up late in the race that saw the red flags waved and the race stopped for the first time since the 2010 Korean Grand Prix. Sebastian Vettel achieved both pole position and the race win ahead of Fernando Alonso and Jenson Button, who had been rapidly catching the race leaders at the time of the race stoppage.

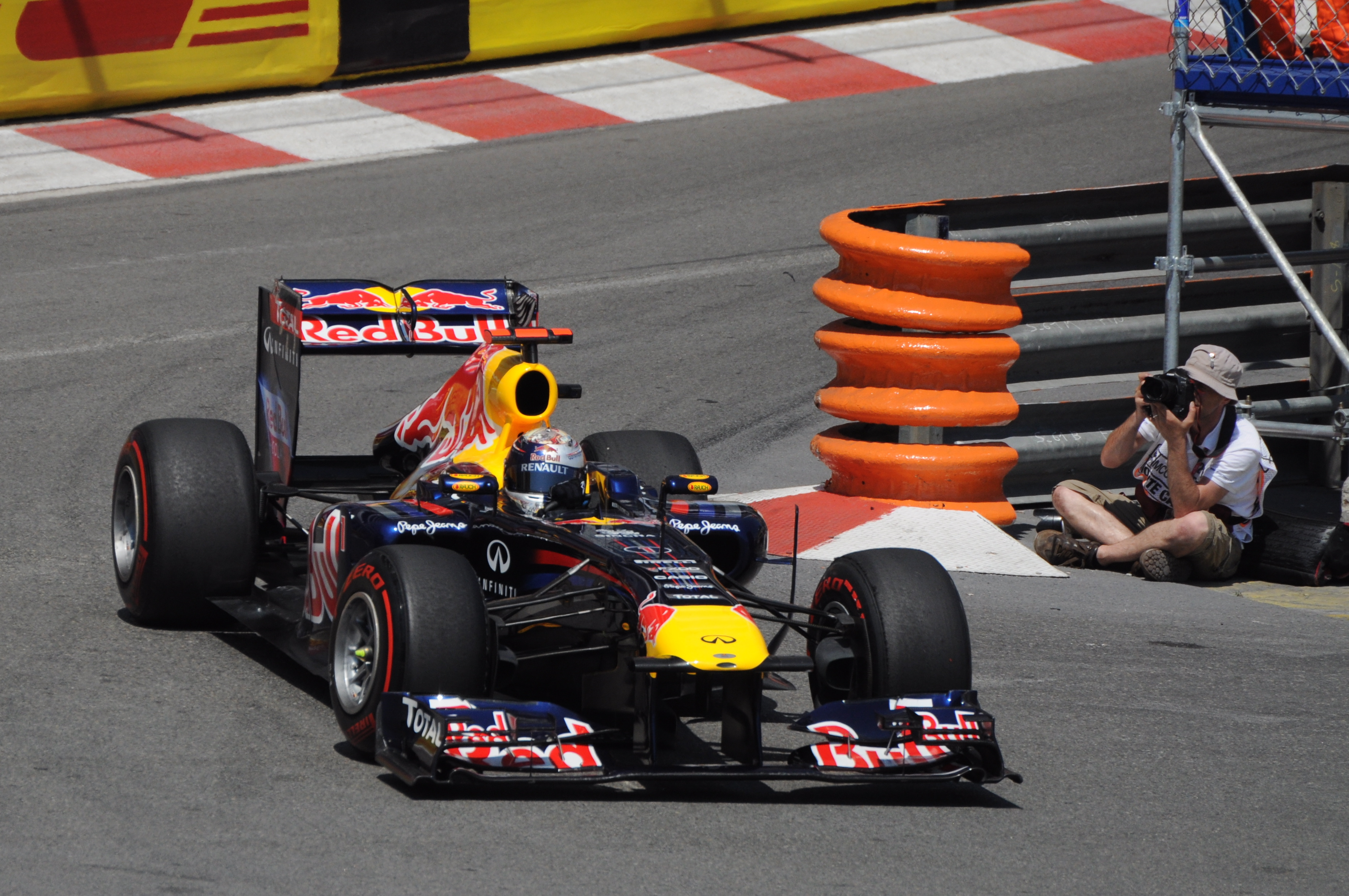
After nine races, Sebastian Vettel had not finished lower than second. He is seen here taking his fifth victory of the season at the Monaco Grand Prix.

Vettel took his sixth pole of the season in Montreal, with the race severely affected by rain. The early stages of the race saw Jenson Button and Lewis Hamilton collide on the pit straight, and Button earning a drive-through penalty for speeding behind the safety car after it was deployed to retrieve the stricken McLaren of Hamilton. On lap twenty-five, the race was stopped for two hours in the face of a torrential downpour that made the circuit undriveable. When the race was finally resumed, a narrow dry line began to appear around the circuit, and Button began to work his way through the field, having run as low as twenty-first and last place after his penalty. With four laps to go, Button had passed Mark Webber and Michael Schumacher for second place and was catching Vettel at a rate that meant he would only catch the championship leader on the final lap. Vettel ran wide and off the dry line of the final lap of the race, handing Button the race win. Schumacher matched his best race result since returning to the sport, with a fourth place. At Sauber, Sergio Pérez elected not to compete after reporting that he felt unwell during the first practice session, and he was replaced by Pedro de la Rosa.

Pirelli's medium-compound tyre made its race debut in Valencia, which once again saw Vettel on pole. There was much speculation about the potential for the field to be shaken up by the introduction of engine mapping bans, but the reigning champion led for most of the race, ceding the lead only when called in to pit. He comfortably gained his sixth victory of the season when the leaders moved onto the medium compound tyres, with second-placed Fernando Alonso demonstrating that the Ferrari 150º Italia was unable to use the medium tyres as efficiently as the Red Bull RB7. With all twenty-four cars finishing the race, Hispania Racing's Narain Karthikeyan became the first man in the sport's history to finish a Grand Prix in twenty-fourth position as the race broke the record for the most classified finishers; the 2011 Chinese Grand Prix had previously seen twenty-three classified finishers.

Uncertainty over rule changes and exemptions concerning the use of off-throttle blown diffusers dominated off-track discussion at the British Grand Prix, though consensus within the media was that the issue did not directly affect the sport. Mark Webber started from pole position in the race; however, Sebastian Vettel took the lead on the first lap. A mistake from Red Bull Racing in the pits allowed Fernando Alonso to take control of the race, which he went on to win by sixteen seconds, his first victory since the 2010 Korean Grand Prix. Webber caught Vettel in the dying stages of the race, but was given a late team order to maintain his position, and the Australian finished third behind his teammate. Felipe Massa was similarly catching Lewis Hamilton, whose progress had been hampered by an order to conserve fuel, for fourth position and the two made contact in the penultimate corner on the last lap, forcing Massa to run wide over the finish line. Jenson Button fell from second to fifth place in the championship when a wheel nut was improperly attached to his car during his final stop, forcing his retirement from the race.

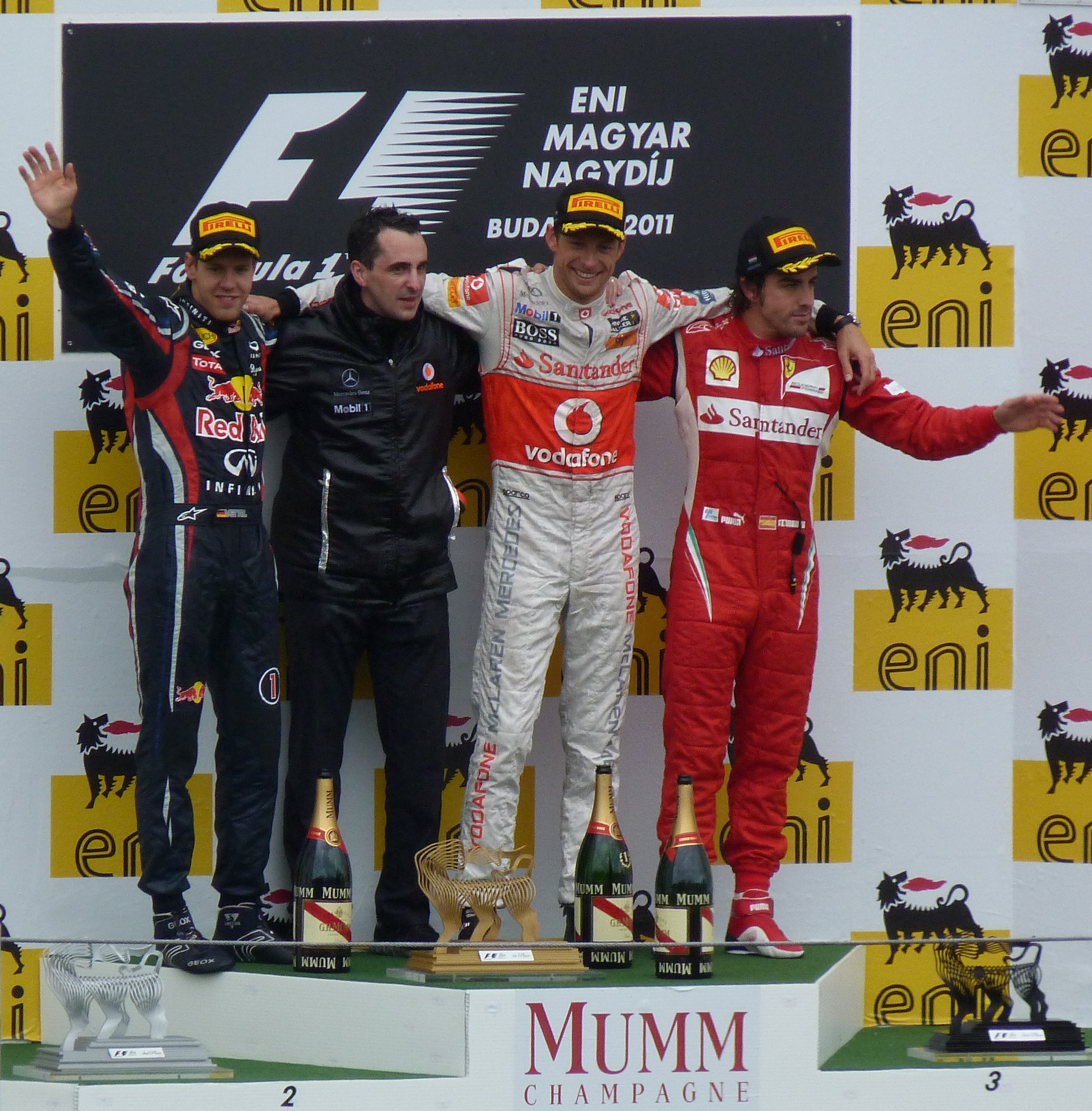
Jenson Button, race winner in his 200th Grand Prix start, is accompanied by Vettel (second), Alonso (third) and his engineer Dave Robson on the podium at the Hungarian Grand Prix

Webber achieved his second successive pole position in Germany, while Hamilton denied Red Bull a front-row lock-out by qualifying second. Vettel was third, the first time he had qualified outside the front row since the 2010 Italian Grand Prix almost one year previously. Hamilton took the lead going into the first corner of the race, and the early stages of the Grand Prix were marked by the drivers attempting to find grip on an unusually cold circuit. As Hamilton, Alonso and Webber pulled away, Vettel struggled to match their pace following a spin at turn ten. Michael Schumacher had an identical episode at the same corner a few laps later, whilst Sébastien Buemi and Nick Heidfeld collided at the chicane, ending Heidfeld's race. There were multiple lead changes between Hamilton, Webber and Alonso, with Hamilton capitalising on a slow in-lap by Alonso and a strategy error from Red Bull to secure victory. Alonso placed second, with Webber third, while Sebastian Vettel stole fourth away from Felipe Massa when the two drivers pitted on the final lap.

Vettel returned to pole position in Hungary; however, Lewis Hamilton qualified second and was able to save an extra set of softer option tyres for the race. After mixed conditions wreaked havoc in the support races, the Grand Prix started with a wet surface. Vettel established an early lead, but was soon passed by Hamilton and Jenson Button as a dry line appeared. The positions remained constant through the halfway point of the race while Team Lotus experienced their second double-retirement in three races and Nick Heidfeld's Renault exploded after a prolonged pit stop. A mid-race shower on the fortieth lap led to Hamilton spinning, forcing Force India's Paul di Resta off the circuit and allowing Button to close the gap. The two McLaren drivers traded places several times in the greasy conditions, with Hamilton leading long enough to give him the first strategy call within the team. He opted to swap to the intermediate tyres, but the track started to dry out and he was given a drive-through penalty for forcing di Resta off the circuit, taking him out of contention for a podium finish. Jenson Button went on to win the race, his 200th Grand Prix start and the scene of his maiden victory ahead of Vettel in second and Fernando Alonso. Hamilton recovered from his penalty to take fourth position from Mark Webber, whilst Felipe Massa – who had out-qualified Alonso for the first time since the 2010 Belgian Grand Prix – was the final car classified on the lead lap in sixth place.

The Belgian Grand Prix marked twenty years since Michael Schumacher's Formula One debut, but Schumacher had a difficult start to the weekend when he lost a wheel on his out-lap in qualifying, sending him to the back of the grid. Bruno Senna replaced Nick Heidfeld at Renault, qualifying seventh in variable conditions on his return to Formula One. However, his success was short-lived when he crashed into Jaime Alguersuari on the first lap, ending Alguersuari's race and earning himself a penalty. Nico Rosberg led the early stages of the race, but was powerless to defend against Sebastian Vettel once the DRS was activated. The lead changed several times in the first half of the race, but Vettel eventually established a comfortable lead and would remain unchallenged. With Vettel winning the race and Webber finishing second, Red Bull secured their first one-two victory since Istanbul. Despite leading the race at one point, Fernando Alonso struggled with his tyres, and slipped down the running order, being passed by Mark Webber and Jenson Button, who had recovered from thirteenth on the grid. Michael Schumacher also recovered; having started twenty-fourth on the grid, he was fifth at the end of the race, behind Alonso and ahead of Rosberg. Lewis Hamilton crashed out of the race early on, making contact with Kamui Kobayashi at Les Combes. Both Senna and Hamilton admitted responsibility for their respective incidents.

At the Italian Grand Prix, Vettel took once again pole position, beating Hamilton by half a second, but it was the fourth-starting Fernando Alonso who led the race going into the first corner. Vitantonio Liuzzi made contact with Kovalainen and lost control, sliding off the grass and crashing heavily into Rosberg and Petrov and triggering the safety car. Vettel took the lead from Alonso one lap after the restart, while Schumacher overtook Hamilton. Mark Webber attempted to pass Felipe Massa, but the two made contact, pitching Massa into a spin. Webber continued with a broken front wing, crashing at Parabolica as he attempted to return to pit. Further down the order, Schumacher received several carefully worded instructions from team principal Ross Brawn, reminding him not to cut across the track to defend against Hamilton. Schumacher's duel with Hamilton slowed them down enough for Jenson Button to catch up; where Hamilton took thirty laps to pass Schumacher, Button passed him on his first attempt and started catching the second-placed Alonso. Vettel went on to win the race, extending his lead enough that he would need just one more win to win his second World Championship. Webber's failure to finish meant that he fell to fourth in the drivers' standings, behind Alonso and Button, while Hamilton's fourth place meant he fell further behind in the championship.

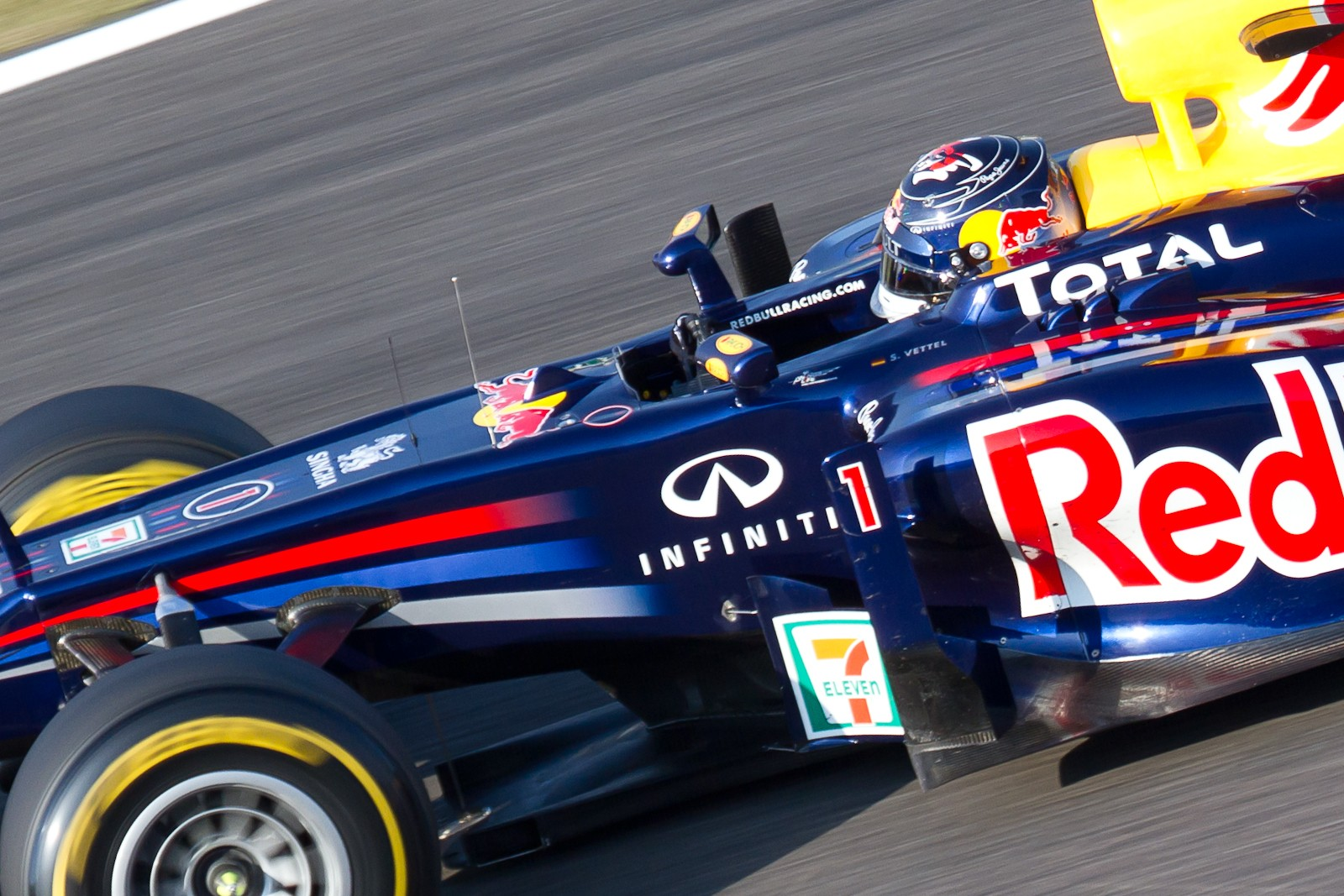
Sebastian Vettel became the youngest double World Champion at the Japanese Grand Prix, by finishing third behind race winner Jenson Button and Fernando Alonso.

Sebastian Vettel obtained his eleventh pole of the season in Singapore, and spent most of the race unchallenged. Jenson Button attempted a late push, but was held up by traffic in the final laps of the race and fell behind. Button's podium meant that the championship would remain unresolved for the time being, but with his ninth victory of the season, Sebastian Vettel closed to within one point of securing his second World Drivers' Championship and becoming the sport's youngest-ever double World Champion. Mark Webber completed the podium in third, while Fernando Alonso finished fourth, over a minute behind Vettel. An early collision with Felipe Massa meant Lewis Hamilton was handed a drive-through penalty – his sixth of the season – and slipped out of the points, but a mid-race safety car for a collision involving Michael Schumacher and Sergio Pérez helped Hamilton recover to fifth. However, the result meant that Webber, Alonso and Hamilton were all eliminated from the championship fight.

The championship came to a head in Japan, with Sebastian Vettel out-qualifying championship rival Jenson Button by just nine thousandths of a second. Vettel forced Button wide at the start, but the McLaren driver was able to recover, under-cutting Vettel in the pits during the second round of stops. Button went on to win the race, his third victory of the season, while Fernando Alonso finished second. Vettel completed the podium, securing his second World Drivers' Championship. Mark Webber finished the race fourth, with Lewis Hamilton fifth and Michael Schumacher defending from Felipe Massa to finish sixth. Nico Rosberg secured the final World Championship point in by finishing tenth, having started twenty-third on the grid.

Lewis Hamilton and McLaren ended Red Bull's monopoly on pole position at the Korean Grand Prix, with Hamilton edging out Champion-elect Vettel by two-tenths of a second. Vettel seized the lead early in the race, and remained unthreatened for the rest of the race. Hamilton engaged in a race-long duel with Mark Webber, with the Australian following an unusual strategy choice. He was unable to pass Hamilton, who collected his first podium position since his victory in the German Grand Prix. Jenson Button finished the race fourth ahead of Fernando Alonso. In finishing first and third, Red Bull secured their second consecutive World Constructors' Championship.

Vettel claimed his first "Grand Chelem" at the inaugural Indian Grand Prix, claiming pole position, the fastest lap and leading every lap of the race. The race saw several incidents on the first lap, with contact between several drivers at the first corner, and again at Turn 3. Jenson Button tightened his grasp on second place in the championship, finishing eight seconds behind Vettel, whilst Fernando Alonso completed the podium ahead of Mark Webber. Lewis Hamilton fell further behind after making contact with Felipe Massa at the halfway point, the third time the two had come together in four races. Narain Karthikeyan became the first Indian driver to compete in the Indian Grand Prix, finishing seventeenth ahead of Hispania teammate Daniel Ricciardo and Jarno Trulli, a victim of the first-lap contact.

Sebastian Vettel equalled Nigel Mansell's record of fourteen pole positions in a season when he was fastest in qualifying at the Abu Dhabi Grand Prix. Vettel however – despite maintaining the lead into the first corner – spun off at Turn 2 with a right rear puncture. He pitted at the end of the lap and had to retire with suspension damage. Hamilton led the whole race, except the pit stop phases, and won the race ahead of Fernando Alonso and teammate Jenson Button. This meant that Red Bull's podium streak came to an end, despite Webber finishing fourth.

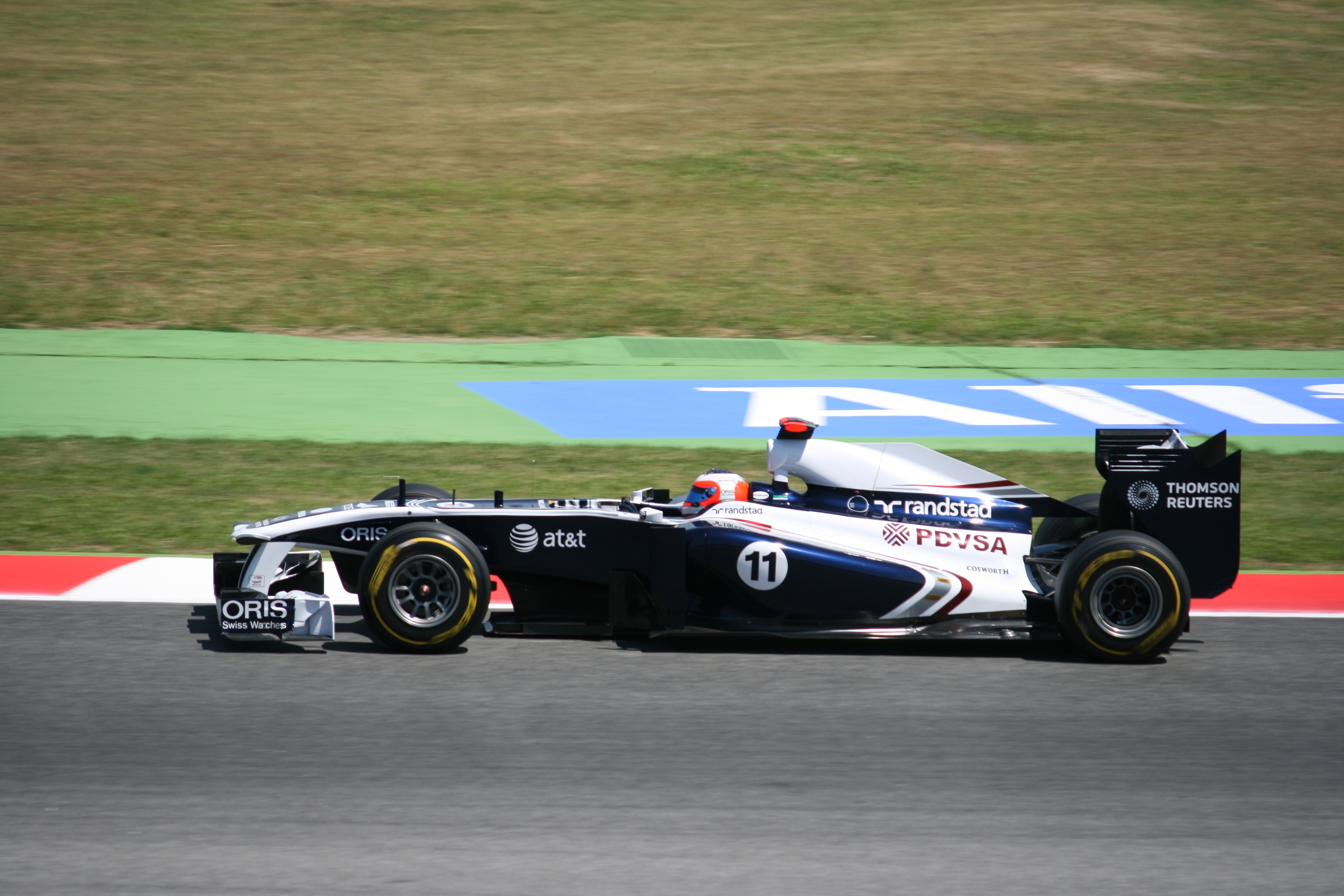
Rubens Barrichello would race his final Grand Prix at home in Brazil, ending his 18-year career in Formula One.

At the final race of the season in Brazil, Vettel broke Mansell's record for most pole positions in a season, taking his fifteenth. Webber emerged victorious, scoring his first race win since the 2010 Hungarian Grand Prix. Hamilton retired on lap 48 with a gearbox problem, joining Pastor Maldonado, Timo Glock, and later Vitantonio Liuzzi on the list of race retirements. Felipe Massa, finishing fifth in his home race, became the first Ferrari driver since Ivan Capelli in 1992 who failed to finish on the podium all season. Meanwhile, Paul di Resta finished the season as the best rookie in 13th place for Force India.

== Results and standings ==
=== Grands Prix ===
Round	Grand Prix	Pole position	Fastest lap	Winning driver	Winning constructor	Report
1	(Australia) Australian Grand Prix	(Germany) Sebastian Vettel	(Brazil) Felipe Massa	(Germany) Sebastian Vettel	(Austria) Red Bull Racing-Renault	Report
2	(Malaysia) Malaysian Grand Prix	(Germany) Sebastian Vettel	(Australia) Mark Webber	(Germany) Sebastian Vettel	(Austria) Red Bull Racing-Renault	Report
3	(China) Chinese Grand Prix	(Germany) Sebastian Vettel	(Australia) Mark Webber	(United Kingdom) Lewis Hamilton	(United Kingdom) McLaren-Mercedes	Report
4	(Turkey) Turkish Grand Prix	(Germany) Sebastian Vettel	(Australia) Mark Webber	(Germany) Sebastian Vettel	(Austria) Red Bull Racing-Renault	Report
5	(Spain) Spanish Grand Prix	(Australia) Mark Webber	(United Kingdom) Lewis Hamilton	(Germany) Sebastian Vettel	(Austria) Red Bull Racing-Renault	Report
6	Monaco Grand Prix	(Germany) Sebastian Vettel	(Australia) Mark Webber	(Germany) Sebastian Vettel	(Austria) Red Bull Racing-Renault	Report
7	(Canada) Canadian Grand Prix	(Germany) Sebastian Vettel	(United Kingdom) Jenson Button	(United Kingdom) Jenson Button	(United Kingdom) McLaren-Mercedes	Report
8	(Spain) European Grand Prix	(Germany) Sebastian Vettel	(Germany) Sebastian Vettel	(Germany) Sebastian Vettel	(Austria) Red Bull Racing-Renault	Report
9	(United Kingdom) British Grand Prix	(Australia) Mark Webber	(Spain) Fernando Alonso	(Spain) Fernando Alonso	(Italy) Ferrari	Report
10	(Germany) German Grand Prix	(Australia) Mark Webber	(United Kingdom) Lewis Hamilton	(United Kingdom) Lewis Hamilton	(United Kingdom) McLaren-Mercedes	Report
11	(Hungary) Hungarian Grand Prix	(Germany) Sebastian Vettel	(Brazil) Felipe Massa	(United Kingdom) Jenson Button	(United Kingdom) McLaren-Mercedes	Report
12	(Belgium) Belgian Grand Prix	(Germany) Sebastian Vettel	(Australia) Mark Webber	(Germany) Sebastian Vettel	(Austria) Red Bull Racing-Renault	Report
13	(Italy) Italian Grand Prix	(Germany) Sebastian Vettel	(United Kingdom) Lewis Hamilton	(Germany) Sebastian Vettel	(Austria) Red Bull Racing-Renault	Report
14	Singapore Grand Prix	(Germany) Sebastian Vettel	(United Kingdom) Jenson Button	(Germany) Sebastian Vettel	(Austria) Red Bull Racing-Renault	Report
15	(Japan) Japanese Grand Prix	(Germany) Sebastian Vettel	(United Kingdom) Jenson Button	(United Kingdom) Jenson Button	(United Kingdom) McLaren-Mercedes	Report
16	(South Korea) Korean Grand Prix	(United Kingdom) Lewis Hamilton	(Germany) Sebastian Vettel	(Germany) Sebastian Vettel	(Austria) Red Bull Racing-Renault	Report
17	(India) Indian Grand Prix	(Germany) Sebastian Vettel	(Germany) Sebastian Vettel	(Germany) Sebastian Vettel	(Austria) Red Bull Racing-Renault	Report
18	(United Arab Emirates) Abu Dhabi Grand Prix	(Germany) Sebastian Vettel	(Australia) Mark Webber	(United Kingdom) Lewis Hamilton	(United Kingdom) McLaren-Mercedes	Report
19	(Brazil) Brazilian Grand Prix	(Germany) Sebastian Vettel	(Australia) Mark Webber	(Australia) Mark Webber	(Austria) Red Bull Racing-Renault	Report

=== Scoring system ===
Points were awarded to the top 10 classified finishers.

Position	1st	2nd	3rd	4th	5th	6th	7th	8th	9th	10th
Points	25	18	15	12	10	8	6	4	2	1

=== World Drivers' Championship standings ===
Pos.	Driver	AUS (Australia)	MAL (Malaysia)	CHN (China)	TUR (Turkey)	ESP (Spain)	MON (Monaco)	CAN (Canada)	EUR (Spain)	GBR (United Kingdom)	GER (Germany)	HUN (Hungary)	BEL (Belgium)	ITA (Italy)	SIN (Singapore)	JPN (Japan)	KOR (South Korea)	IND (India)	ABU (United Arab Emirates)	BRA (Brazil)	Points
1	(Germany) Sebastian Vettel	1^{P}	1^{P}	2^{P}	1^{P}	1	1^{P}	2^{P}	1^{P}^{F}	2	4	2^{P}	1^{P}	1^{P}	1^{P}	3^{P}	1^{F}	1^{P}^{F}	Ret^{P}	2^{P}	392
2	(United Kingdom) Jenson Button	6	2	4	6	3	3	1^{F}	6	Ret	Ret	1	3	2	2^{F}	1^{F}	4	2	3	3	270
3	(Australia) Mark Webber	5	4^{F}	3^{F}	2^{F}	4^{P}	4^{F}	3	3	3^{P}	3^{P}	5	2^{F}	Ret	3	4	3	4	4^{F}	1^{F}	258
4	(Spain) Fernando Alonso	4	6	7	3	5	2	Ret	2	1^{F}	2	3	4	3	4	2	5	3	2	4	257
5	(United Kingdom) Lewis Hamilton	2	8	1	4	2^{F}	6	Ret	4	4	1^{F}	4	Ret	4^{F}	5	5	2^{P}	7	1	Ret	227
6	(Brazil) Felipe Massa	7^{F}	5	6	11	Ret	Ret	6	5	5	5	6^{F}	8	6	9	7	6	Ret	5	5	118
7	(Germany) Nico Rosberg	Ret	12	5	5	7	11	11	7	6	7	9	6	Ret	7	10	8	6	6	7	89
8	(Germany) Michael Schumacher	Ret	9	8	12	6	Ret	4	17	9	8	Ret	5	5	Ret	6	Ret	5	7	15	76
9	(Germany) Adrian Sutil	9	11	15	13	13	7	Ret	9	11	6	14	7	Ret	8	11	11	9	8	6	42
10	(Russia) Vitaly Petrov	3	17^{†}	9	8	11	Ret	5	15	12	10	12	9	Ret	17	9	Ret	11	13	10	37
11	(Germany) Nick Heidfeld	12	3	12	7	8	8	Ret	10	8	Ret	Ret									34
12	(Japan) Kamui Kobayashi	DSQ	7	10	10	10	5	7	16	Ret	9	11	12	Ret	14	13	15	Ret	10	9	30
13	(United Kingdom) Paul di Resta	10	10	11	Ret	12	12	18^{†}	14	15	13	7	11	8	6	12	10	13	9	8	27
14	(Spain) Jaime Alguersuari	11	14	Ret	16	16	Ret	8	8	10	12	10	Ret	7	21^{†}	15	7	8	15	11	26
15	(Switzerland) Sébastien Buemi	8	13	14	9	14	10	10	13	Ret	15	8	Ret	10	12	Ret	9	Ret	Ret	12	15
16	(Mexico) Sergio Pérez	DSQ	Ret	17	14	9	WD	WD	11	7	11	15	Ret	Ret	10	8	16	10	11	13	14
17	(Brazil) Rubens Barrichello	Ret	Ret	13	15	17	9	9	12	13	Ret	13	16	12	13	17	12	15	12	14	4
18	(Brazil) Bruno Senna												13	9	15	16	13	12	16	17	2
19	(Venezuela) Pastor Maldonado	Ret	Ret	18	17	15	18^{†}	Ret	18	14	14	16	10	11	11	14	Ret	Ret	14	Ret	1
20	(Spain) Pedro de la Rosa							12													0
21	(Italy) Jarno Trulli	13	Ret	19	18	18	13	16	20	Ret		Ret	14	14	Ret	19	17	19	18	18	0
22	(Finland) Heikki Kovalainen	Ret	15	16	19	Ret	14	Ret	19	Ret	16	Ret	15	13	16	18	14	14	17	16	0
23	(Italy) Vitantonio Liuzzi	DNQ	Ret	22	22	Ret	16	13	23	18	Ret	20	19	Ret	20	23	21		20	Ret	0
24	(Belgium) Jérôme d'Ambrosio	14	Ret	20	20	20	15	14	22	17	18	19	17	Ret	18	21	20	16	Ret	19	0
25	(Germany) Timo Glock	NC	16	21	DNS	19	Ret	15	21	16	17	17	18	15	Ret	20	18	Ret	19	Ret	0
26	(India) Narain Karthikeyan	DNQ	Ret	23	21	21	17	17	24									17			0
27	(Australia) Daniel Ricciardo									19	19	18	Ret	NC	19	22	19	18	Ret	20	0
28	(India) Karun Chandhok										20										0
Pos.	Driver	AUS (Australia)	MAL (Malaysia)	CHN (China)	TUR (Turkey)	ESP (Spain)	MON (Monaco)	CAN (Canada)	EUR (Spain)	GBR (United Kingdom)	GER (Germany)	HUN (Hungary)	BEL (Belgium)	ITA (Italy)	SIN (Singapore)	JPN (Japan)	KOR (South Korea)	IND (India)	ABU (United Arab Emirates)	BRA (Brazil)	Points

Key
Colour	Result
Gold	Winner
Silver	Second place
Bronze	Third place
Green	Other points position
Blue	Other classified position
Blue	Not classified, finished (NC)
Purple	Not classified, retired (Ret)
Red	Did not qualify (DNQ)
Black	Disqualified (DSQ)
White	Did not start (DNS)
White	Race cancelled (C)
Blank	Did not practice (DNP)
Blank	Excluded (EX)
Blank	Did not arrive (DNA)
Blank	Withdrawn (WD)
Blank	Did not enter (empty cell)
Annotation	Meaning
P	Pole position
F	Fastest lap

Notes:

- † – Drivers did not finish the Grand Prix, but were classified as they completed more than 90% of the race distance.

=== World Constructors' Championship standings ===
Pos.	Constructor	No.	AUS (Australia)	MAL (Malaysia)	CHN (China)	TUR (Turkey)	ESP (Spain)	MON (Monaco)	CAN (Canada)	EUR (Spain)	GBR (United Kingdom)	GER (Germany)	HUN (Hungary)	BEL (Belgium)	ITA (Italy)	SIN (Singapore)	JPN (Japan)	KOR (South Korea)	IND (India)	ABU (United Arab Emirates)	BRA (Brazil)	Points
1	(Austria) Red Bull Racing-Renault	1	1^{P}	1^{P}	2^{P}	1^{P}	1	1^{P}	2^{P}	1^{P}^{F}	2	4	2^{P}	1^{P}	1^{P}	1^{P}	3^{P}	1^{F}	1^{P}^{F}	Ret^{P}	2^{P}	650
1	(Austria) Red Bull Racing-Renault	2	5	4^{F}	3^{F}	2^{F}	4^{P}	4^{F}	3	3	3^{P}	3^{P}	5	2^{F}	Ret	3	4	3	4	4^{F}	1^{F}	650
2	(United Kingdom) McLaren-Mercedes	3	2	8	1	4	2^{F}	6	Ret	4	4	1^{F}	4	Ret	4^{F}	5	5	2^{P}	7	1	Ret	497
2	(United Kingdom) McLaren-Mercedes	4	6	2	4	6	3	3	1^{F}	6	Ret	Ret	1	3	2	2^{F}	1^{F}	4	2	3	3	497
3	(Italy) Ferrari	5	4	6	7	3	5	2	Ret	2	1^{F}	2	3	4	3	4	2	5	3	2	4	375
3	(Italy) Ferrari	6	7^{F}	5	6	11	Ret	Ret	6	5	5	5	6^{F}	8	6	9	7	6	Ret	5	5	375
4	(Germany) Mercedes	7	Ret	9	8	12	6	Ret	4	17	9	8	Ret	5	5	Ret	6	Ret	5	7	15	165
4	(Germany) Mercedes	8	Ret	12	5	5	7	11	11	7	6	7	9	6	Ret	7	10	8	6	6	7	165
5	(United Kingdom) Renault	9	12	3	12	7	8	8	Ret	10	8	Ret	Ret	13	9	15	16	13	12	16	17	73
5	(United Kingdom) Renault	10	3	17^{†}	9	8	11	Ret	5	15	12	10	12	9	Ret	17	9	Ret	11	13	10	73
6	Force India-Mercedes	14	9	11	15	13	13	7	Ret	9	11	6	14	7	Ret	8	11	11	9	8	6	69
6	Force India-Mercedes	15	10	10	11	Ret	12	12	18^{†}	14	15	13	7	11	8	6	12	10	13	9	8	69
7	(Switzerland) Sauber-Ferrari	16	DSQ	7	10	10	10	5	7	16	Ret	9	11	12	Ret	14	13	15	Ret	10	9	44
7	(Switzerland) Sauber-Ferrari	17	DSQ	Ret	17	14	9	DNS	12	11	7	11	15	Ret	Ret	10	8	16	10	11	13	44
8	(Italy) Toro Rosso-Ferrari	18	8	13	14	9	14	10	10	13	Ret	15	8	Ret	10	12	Ret	9	Ret	Ret	12	41
8	(Italy) Toro Rosso-Ferrari	19	11	14	Ret	16	16	Ret	8	8	10	12	10	Ret	7	21^{†}	15	7	8	15	11	41
9	(United Kingdom) Williams-Cosworth	11	Ret	Ret	13	15	17	9	9	12	13	Ret	13	16	12	13	17	12	15	12	14	5
9	(United Kingdom) Williams-Cosworth	12	Ret	Ret	18	17	15	18^{†}	Ret	18	14	14	16	10	11	11	14	Ret	Ret	14	Ret	5
10	(Malaysia) Lotus-Renault	20	Ret	15	16	19	Ret	14	Ret	19	Ret	16	Ret	15	13	16	18	14	14	17	16	0
10	(Malaysia) Lotus-Renault	21	13	Ret	19	18	18	13	16	20	Ret	20	Ret	14	14	Ret	19	17	19	18	18	0
11	(Spain) HRT-Cosworth	22	DNQ	Ret	23	21	21	17	17	24	19	19	18	Ret	NC	19	22	19	17	Ret	20	0
11	(Spain) HRT-Cosworth	23	DNQ	Ret	22	22	Ret	16	13	23	18	Ret	20	19	Ret	20	23	21	18	20	Ret	0
12	(Russia) Virgin-Cosworth	24	NC	16	21	DNS	19	Ret	15	21	16	17	17	18	15	Ret	20	18	Ret	19	Ret	0
12	(Russia) Virgin-Cosworth	25	14	Ret	20	20	20	15	14	22	17	18	19	17	Ret	18	21	20	16	Ret	19	0
Pos.	Constructor	No.	AUS (Australia)	MAL (Malaysia)	CHN (China)	TUR (Turkey)	ESP (Spain)	MON (Monaco)	CAN (Canada)	EUR (Spain)	GBR (United Kingdom)	GER (Germany)	HUN (Hungary)	BEL (Belgium)	ITA (Italy)	SIN (Singapore)	JPN (Japan)	KOR (South Korea)	IND (India)	ABU (United Arab Emirates)	BRA (Brazil)	Points

Key
Colour	Result
Gold	Winner
Silver	Second place
Bronze	Third place
Green	Other points position
Blue	Other classified position
Blue	Not classified, finished (NC)
Purple	Not classified, retired (Ret)
Red	Did not qualify (DNQ)
Black	Disqualified (DSQ)
White	Did not start (DNS)
White	Race cancelled (C)
Blank	Did not practice (DNP)
Blank	Excluded (EX)
Blank	Did not arrive (DNA)
Blank	Withdrawn (WD)
Blank	Did not enter (empty cell)
Annotation	Meaning
P	Pole position
F	Fastest lap

Notes:

- † – Drivers did not finish the Grand Prix, but were classified as they completed more than 90% of the race distance.
- Official FIA results list the Constructors' Championship placings as Red Bull Racing, Vodafone McLaren Mercedes, Scuderia Ferrari etc.

== See also ==
- 2011 Formula One pre-season testing
- 2011 Formula One post-season testing
