= 2011 Chinese Grand Prix =

Race 3 of 19 in the 2011 Formula One World Championship
← Previous race	Next race →

Race details
- Date: 17 April 2011
- Official name: 2011 Formula 1 UBS Chinese Grand Prix
- Location: Shanghai International Circuit; Shanghai, People's Republic of China
- Course: Permanent racing facility
- Course length: 5.451 km (3.387 miles)
- Distance: 56 laps, 305.066 km (189.559 miles)
- Weather: Fine and Dry Air Temp 22 °C (72 °F) Track Temp 32 °C (90 °F) dropping to 26 °C (79 °F)

Pole position
Driver	(Germany) Sebastian Vettel	Red Bull Racing-Renault
- Time: 1:33.706

Fastest lap
Driver	(Australia) Mark Webber	Red Bull Racing-Renault
- Time: 1:38.993 on lap 42

Podium
First	(United Kingdom) Lewis Hamilton	McLaren-Mercedes
Second	(Germany) Sebastian Vettel	Red Bull Racing-Renault
Third	(Australia) Mark Webber	Red Bull Racing-Renault

The 2011 Chinese Grand Prix (formally the 2011 Formula 1 UBS Chinese Grand Prix) was a Formula One motor race held on 17 April 2011 at the Shanghai International Circuit in Shanghai, People's Republic of China. It was the third round of the 2011 Formula One season. The 56-lap race was won by McLaren driver Lewis Hamilton after starting from third on the grid, also becoming the first ever multiple winner of the Chinese Grand Prix. Sebastian Vettel finished second in a Red Bull Racing, having started from pole position, and teammate Mark Webber completed the podium, in third place having started eighteenth.

As a consequence of the race, Vettel's lead in the World Drivers' Championship was cut to 21 points by Hamilton, who moved into second place in the championship. Hamilton's McLaren teammate Jenson Button, who finished fourth in China, fell 9 points behind Hamilton in third, a single point ahead of Webber. In the World Constructors' Championship, Red Bull's championship lead was also cut from 24 points to 20 by McLaren, with Ferrari a further 35 points behind in third position after drivers Felipe Massa and Fernando Alonso finished in sixth and seventh places respectively.

== Report ==
=== Background ===
Heading into the race, Sebastian Vettel led the Championship on the maximum 50 points after winning the first two races. Jenson Button was in second place in the standings after a 2nd and a 6th that put him on 26 points - just over half Vettel's total, and almost a race win behind. The other McLaren of Lewis Hamilton and yet to reach the podium, Mark Webber, were third and fourth respectively, both on 22 points. Fernando Alonso was fifth with 20 points, followed by Heidfeld on 17, Massa on 16 and Petrov on 15. In both races thus far in 2011 the podium had featured Vettel as the winner, a McLaren in second place and a Renault in third.

Tyre supplier Pirelli brought its silver-banded hard compound tyre as the harder "prime" tyre and the yellow-banded soft compound as the softer "option" compound. This was the same tyre selection that Bridgestone had chosen bring to the Chinese Grand Prix for the previous year.

In the Constructors' table, Red Bull Racing led with 72 points, one and a half times McLaren's score (48), and double Ferrari's (36). Despite having two podiums, Renault were still behind Ferrari; but only just - with 30 points - and were putting up a good fight for the time being. Sauber were fifth in the standings, with 6 points, Toro Rosso and Force India had 4, and Mercedes had 2. By this point of the season, Williams were yet to finish a race.

=== Qualifying ===
Sebastian Vettel took a comfortable pole position in qualifying, with the second placed Jenson Button 0.7 seconds behind him and Button's McLaren teammate Lewis Hamilton in third. Mark Webber had a torrid session, eliminated in the first part of qualifying after electrical problems in the earlier free practice, placing him 18th on the starting grid.

Nico Rosberg in his Mercedes found himself fourth, Rosberg also recorded the fastest time of the first part of the qualifying session. Behind him were the Ferraris of Alonso and Massa, who had been unable to keep up with the pace of Red Bull or McLaren, Alonso recording a time almost a second off Vettel's pole position lap. Vitaly Petrov recorded a time in part two that got him through to the final part of qualifying, however, his car developed problems and stopped on the track, meaning he was unable to take part in the final session and would take the tenth place on the grid.

=== Race ===
Lewis Hamilton faced a stressful situation just minutes before the start of the race; a fuel problem with his car meant that if he had started his journey to the grid just 35 seconds later, he would have had to start from the pit-lane. Hamilton however, went on to a thrilling three-stop race, overtaking his two-stopping rival and World Drivers' Championship leader Sebastian Vettel on lap 52 of the 56 lap race. Vettel had had a poor start to his race, being beaten on the first lap by both McLarens, with Jenson Button initially holding the upper hand, but his teammate Hamilton putting in a series of fastest laps that would ultimately give him victory to Button's fourth-place finish. Also Hamilton performed an overtake on his teammate in Turn 1, about the midpoint of the race to take second place.

Mark Webber drove a spectacular race from 18th on the starting grid to bring his Red Bull to the chequered flag in 3rd position, beating Jenson Button for the final podium place on only the last lap. Button had made a terrible mistake on the 15th lap when bringing his car into the pits, stopping in the Red Bull pit before being waved off by the Red Bull mechanics into his own McLaren pit one place ahead. The mistake cost Button time, as it did for Sebastian Vettel who was also coming into the pits and had to wait behind Button for him to realise his error; although Button entered the pits in the lead, but exited behind Vettel. Jaime Alguersuari lost a wheel on his exit from the pits on lap 10, forcing his retirement from the race. He was the race's only retirement, meaning that this race set the record for the most finishers (23). The record was beaten later in the season, in Valencia, where all 24 starters finished the race.

The race cut Sebastian Vettel's championship lead to 21 points from second placed Lewis Hamilton, with Red Bull constructors lead to McLaren falling to 20 points. Hamilton was ecstatic after his victory, saying "It was one of the best races I've experienced. It feels amazing to be able to bring home a victory for the guys in the factory."

Due to the lack of all but one retirement in the course of the race and the size of the grid at the time, Narain Karthikeyan posted a finishing position of 23rd for HRT. This would earn Karthikeyan the title of the lowest finishing position ever recorded in Formula One history at the time. This record would then be broken five races later when Karthikeyan posted a 24th finishing position at the 2011 European Grand Prix.

== Classification ==
=== Qualifying ===
Pos	No	Driver	Constructor	Part 1	Part 2	Part 3	Grid
1	1	(Germany) Sebastian Vettel	Red Bull Racing-Renault	1:35.674	1:34.776	1:33.706	1
2	4	(United Kingdom) Jenson Button	McLaren-Mercedes	1:35.924	1:34.662	1:34.421	2
3	3	(United Kingdom) Lewis Hamilton	McLaren-Mercedes	1:36.091	1:34.486	1:34.463	3
4	8	(Germany) Nico Rosberg	Mercedes	1:35.272	1:35.850	1:34.670	4
5	5	(Spain) Fernando Alonso	Ferrari	1:35.389	1:35.165	1:35.119	5
6	6	(Brazil) Felipe Massa	Ferrari	1:35.478	1:35.437	1:35.145	6
7	19	(Spain) Jaime Alguersuari	Toro Rosso-Ferrari	1:36.133	1:35.563	1:36.158	7
8	15	(United Kingdom) Paul di Resta	Force India-Mercedes	1:35.702	1:35.858	1:36.190	8
9	18	(Switzerland) Sébastien Buemi	Toro Rosso-Ferrari	1:36.110	1:35.500	1:36.203	9
10	10	(Russia) Vitaly Petrov	Renault	1:35.370	1:35.149	no time^{1}	10
11	14	(Germany) Adrian Sutil	Force India-Mercedes	1:36.092	1:35.874		11
12	17	(Mexico) Sergio Pérez	Sauber-Ferrari	1:36.046	1:36.053		12
13	16	(Japan) Kamui Kobayashi	Sauber-Ferrari	1:36.147	1:36.236		13
14	7	(Germany) Michael Schumacher	Mercedes	1:35.508	1:36.457		14
15	11	(Brazil) Rubens Barrichello	Williams-Cosworth	1:35.911	1:36.465		15
16	9	(Germany) Nick Heidfeld	Renault	1:35.910	1:36.611		16
17	12	(Venezuela) Pastor Maldonado	Williams-Cosworth	1:36.121	1:36.956		17
18	2	(Australia) Mark Webber	Red Bull Racing-Renault	1:36.468			18
19	20	(Finland) Heikki Kovalainen	Lotus-Renault	1:37.894			19
20	21	(Italy) Jarno Trulli	Lotus-Renault	1:38.318			20
21	25	(Belgium) Jérôme d'Ambrosio	Virgin-Cosworth	1:39.119			21
22	24	(Germany) Timo Glock	Virgin-Cosworth	1:39.708			22
23	23	(Italy) Vitantonio Liuzzi	HRT-Cosworth	1:40.212			23
24	22	(India) Narain Karthikeyan	HRT-Cosworth	1:40.445			24
107% time: 1:41.941

Notes

1. – Vitaly Petrov stopped on track during Q2. While the lap time he posted managed to get him into Q3, he was not able to take further part in the qualifying session.

=== Race ===
Pos	No	Driver	Constructor	Laps	Time/Retired	Grid	Points
1	3	(United Kingdom) Lewis Hamilton	McLaren-Mercedes	56	1:36:58.226	3	25
2	1	(Germany) Sebastian Vettel	Red Bull Racing-Renault	56	+5.198	1	18
3	2	(Australia) Mark Webber	Red Bull Racing-Renault	56	+7.555	18	15
4	4	(United Kingdom) Jenson Button	McLaren-Mercedes	56	+10.000	2	12
5	8	(Germany) Nico Rosberg	Mercedes	56	+13.448	4	10
6	6	(Brazil) Felipe Massa	Ferrari	56	+15.840	6	8
7	5	(Spain) Fernando Alonso	Ferrari	56	+30.622	5	6
8	7	(Germany) Michael Schumacher	Mercedes	56	+31.026	14	4
9	10	(Russia) Vitaly Petrov	Renault	56	+57.404	10	2
10	16	(Japan) Kamui Kobayashi	Sauber-Ferrari	56	+1:03.273	13	1
11	15	(United Kingdom) Paul di Resta	Force India-Mercedes	56	+1:08.757	8	
12	9	(Germany) Nick Heidfeld	Renault	56	+1:12.739	16	
13	11	(Brazil) Rubens Barrichello	Williams-Cosworth	56	+1:30.189	15	
14	18	(Switzerland) Sébastien Buemi	Toro Rosso-Ferrari	56	+1:30.671	9	
15	14	(Germany) Adrian Sutil	Force India-Mercedes	55	+1 Lap	11	
16	20	(Finland) Heikki Kovalainen	Lotus-Renault	55	+1 Lap	19	
17	17	(Mexico) Sergio Pérez	Sauber-Ferrari	55	+1 Lap	12	
18	12	(Venezuela) Pastor Maldonado	Williams-Cosworth	55	+1 Lap	17	
19	21	(Italy) Jarno Trulli	Lotus-Renault	55	+1 Lap	20	
20	25	(Belgium) Jérôme d'Ambrosio	Virgin-Cosworth	54	+2 Laps	21	
21	24	(Germany) Timo Glock	Virgin-Cosworth	54	+2 Laps	22	
22	23	(Italy) Vitantonio Liuzzi	HRT-Cosworth	54	+2 Laps	23	
23	22	(India) Narain Karthikeyan	HRT-Cosworth	54	+2 Laps	24	
Ret	19	(Spain) Jaime Alguersuari	Toro Rosso-Ferrari	9	Wheel	7	

== Championship standings after the race ==
Drivers' Championship standings

	Pos.	Driver	Points
	1	(Germany) Sebastian Vettel	68
1	2	(United Kingdom) Lewis Hamilton	47
1	3	(United Kingdom) Jenson Button	38
	4	(Australia) Mark Webber	37
	5	(Spain) Fernando Alonso	26

Constructors' Championship standings

	Pos.	Constructor	Points
	1	(Austria) Red Bull Racing-Renault	105
	2	(United Kingdom) McLaren-Mercedes	85
	3	(Italy) Ferrari	50
	4	(United Kingdom) Renault	32
4	5	(Germany) Mercedes	16

- Note: Only the top five positions are included for both sets of standings.

Previous race: 2011 Malaysian Grand Prix	FIA Formula One World Championship; 2011 season	Next race: 2011 Turkish Grand Prix
Previous race: 2010 Chinese Grand Prix	Chinese Grand Prix	Next race: 2012 Chinese Grand Prix
