= Lotus T127 =

2010 Formula One car

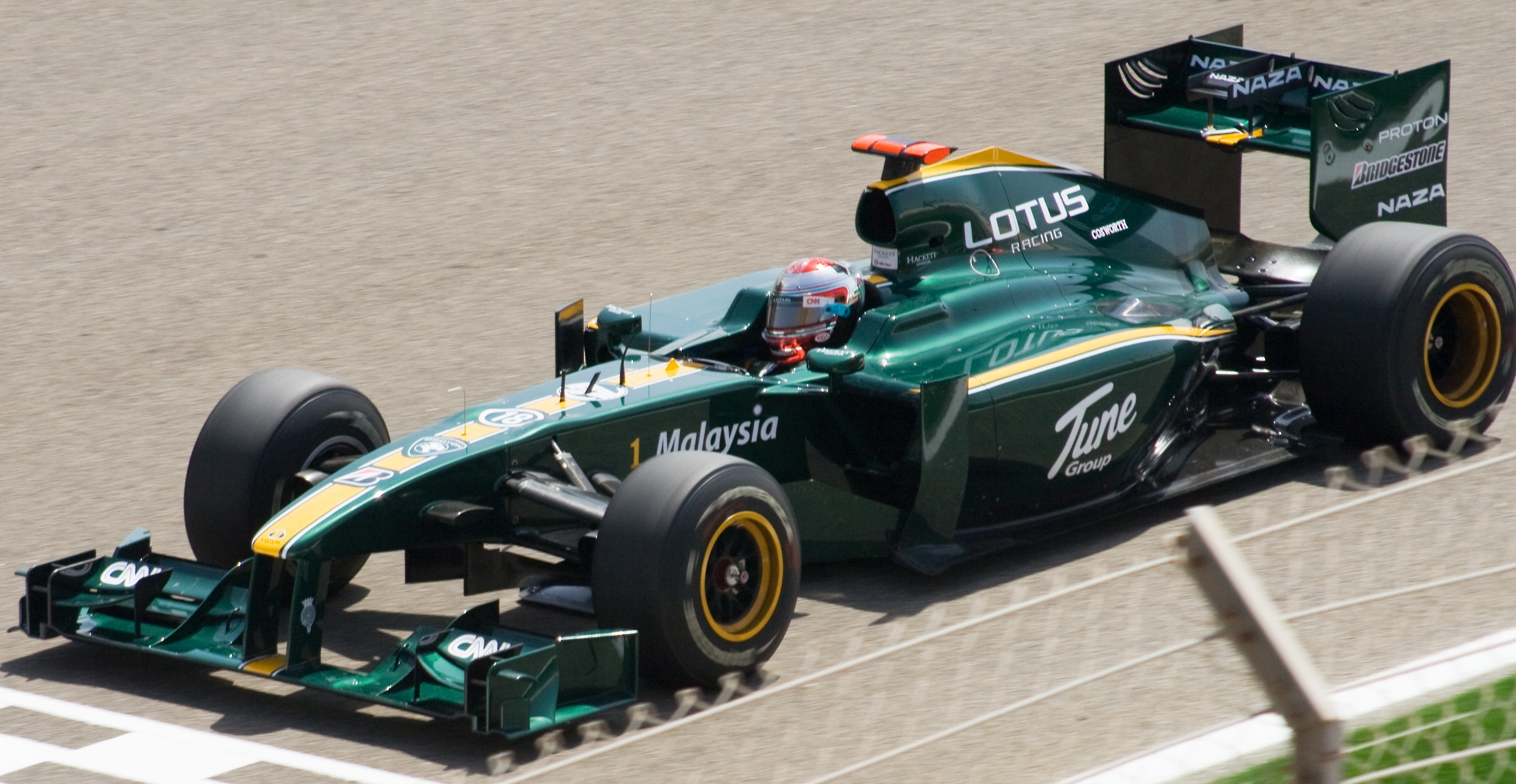
- Jarno Trulli driving the T127 at the Bahrain Grand Prix
- Category: Formula One
- Constructor: Lotus
- Designers: Mike Gascoyne (Chief Technical Officer); Dieter Gass (Deputy Technical Director); Mark Tatham (Chief Designer); Frank Ramowsky (Head of R&D); Elliot Dason-Barber (Head of Vehicle Dynamics); Jean-Claude Migeot (Head of Aerodynamics)
- Successor: Lotus T128

Technical specifications
- Chassis: carbon-fibre and honeycomb composite monocoque
- Suspension (front): carbon-fibre
- Suspension (rear): carbon-fibre
- Engine: Cosworth CA2010 2,400 cc (146.5 cu in) 90° V8, limited to 18,000 RPM naturally aspirated mid-mounted
- Transmission: Seven-speed semi-automatic X-Trac gearbox with reverse gear
- Weight: 620 kg (1,367 lb) (including driver)
- Fuel: BP
- Lubricants: Castrol
- Tyres: Bridgestone Potenza; BBS Wheels (front and rear): 13"

Competition history
- Notable entrants: Lotus Racing
- Notable drivers: 18. (Italy) Jarno Trulli; 19. (Finland) Heikki Kovalainen
- Debut: 2010 Bahrain Grand Prix
- Last event: 2010 Abu Dhabi Grand Prix
Races	Wins	Podiums	Poles	F/Laps
19	0	0	0	0

The Lotus T127 is a Formula One motor racing car designed and built by Lotus Racing for the 2010 season. It was driven by Jarno Trulli and Heikki Kovalainen and was unveiled in London, on 12 February 2010. The car made its track début in the hands of test driver Fairuz Fauzy on 17 February 2010 at Circuito de Jerez.

== Formation of Team Lotus ==
Following the 1994 collapse – but before the end of that season – the rights to the name Team Lotus were purchased by David Hunt, brother of former F1 champion James Hunt. In 2009, when the FIA announced an intention to invite entries for a budget-limited championship in 2010, Litespeed acquired the right to submit an entry under the historic name. Lotus Cars, the sister company of the original Team Lotus, distanced itself from the new entry and announced its willingness to take action to protect its name and reputation if necessary. When the 2010 entry list was released on 12 June 2009, the Litespeed Team Lotus entry was not one of those selected.

Litespeed F3 team approached Malaysian entrepreneur Tony Fernandes, who already sponsored the Williams team through his AirAsia airline. In September 2009, reports emerged of plans for the Malaysian Government to back a Lotus named entry for the 2010 championship to promote the Malaysian car manufacturer Proton, which owned Lotus Cars. On 15 September 2009, the FIA announced that the Malaysian-backed team Lotus Racing had been granted admission into the 2010 season. Group Lotus later terminated the licence for future seasons as a result of what it called "flagrant and persistent breaches of the licence by the team".

Founded as Lotus Racing, the team was operated by 1Malaysia Racing Team Sdn. Bhd., a privately funded project jointly owned by Tune Group and Naza Group, in partnership with the Malaysian Government and a consortium of Malaysian entrepreneurs. Proton, the Malaysian car company which owns Lotus Cars, gave permission for the team to use the Lotus brand in Formula One. The Malaysian Government emphasised that the government itself is not going to invest in the team and that the Malaysian government's investment is only through Proton.

On 24 September 2010, it was announced that Tony Fernandes (Lotus Racing) had acquired the name rights of Team Lotus from David Hunt, marking the official rebirth of Team Lotus in Formula One.

== Preseason ==
Mike Gascoyne said "We've got a great heritage that we've got to live up to". He also said they wanted to rival the debut of Brawn GP but said that would be a greater challenge as the Brawn team already had a car ready for racing and all they needed was financing. He also mentioned the main objective was to have a car on the grid in Bahrain at 2010.

Development of the 2010 car started late, due to the late acceptance of the team's entry. On 14 September 2009, the first four people started work, with the factory being bare, empty and old. When Kovalainen first visited the Lotus factory, people were still building the walls and floors. Gascoyne phoned some people he knew to help at the factory. By November, they had a mock engine design. Working with Fondtechon aerodynamics, the team used engines supplied by Cosworth, and gearboxes from Xtrac. The design was revealed in October 2009 at the start of the wind tunnel programme. On 17 November, Gascoyne and Fernandes gave a joint interview saying they're "feeling the pressure of the famous name".

On 14 December 2009, the team announced their drivers for their debut season as former Toyota driver Jarno Trulli and McLaren's Heikki Kovalainen. Malaysian driver Fairuz Fauzy was also confirmed as the team's test and reserve driver.

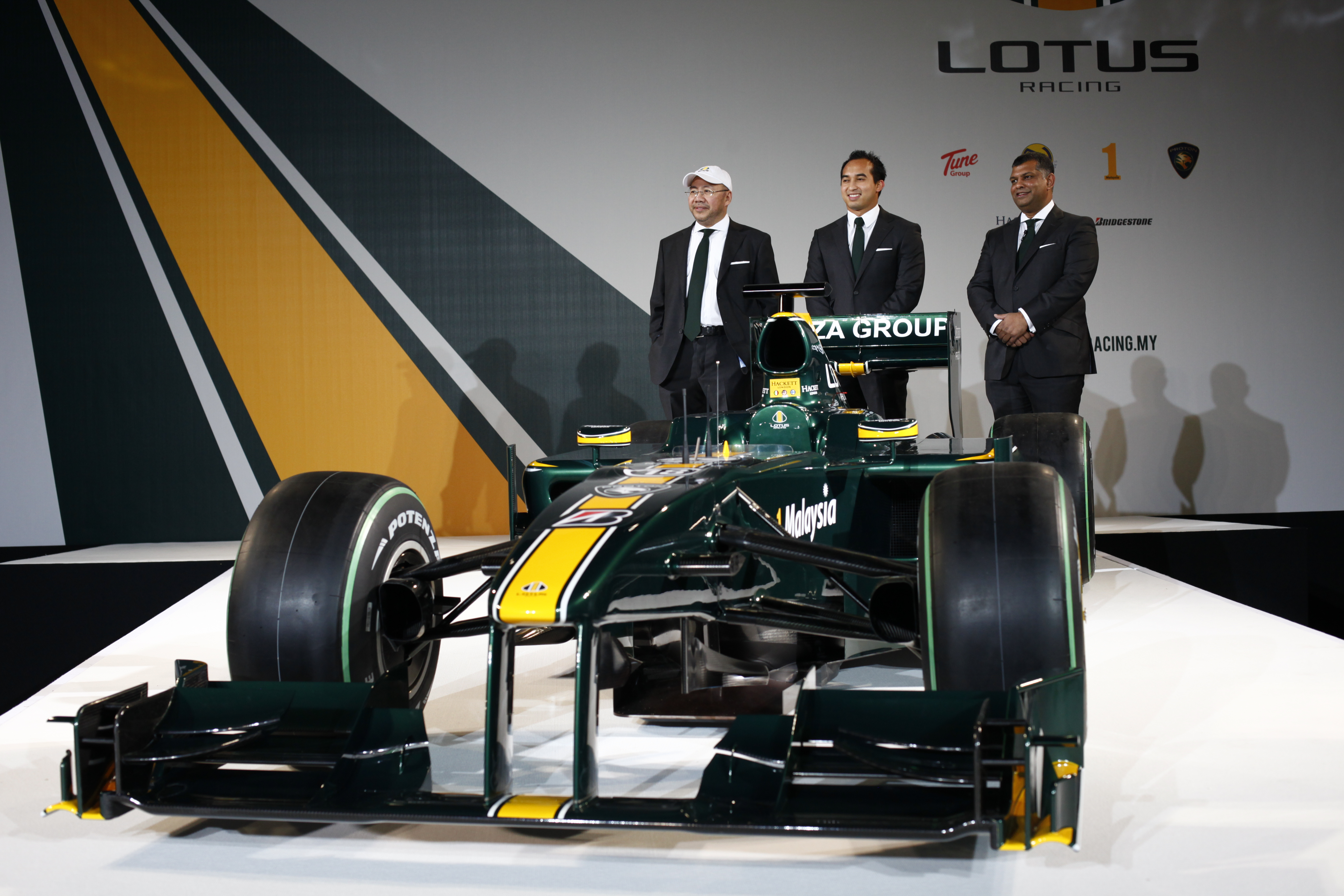
Lotus Racing T127 launch

Trulli stressed they will have to progress one step at a time. "We have to set realistic targets for the first year," he said in Malaysia. "We are one of the new teams, so we have to prove ourselves and to gain respect in the paddock. We have to establish ourselves as the best of the new teams and see what gap we have between us and the rest. Only then will we really understand what gains we need to make."

== 2010 season ==
Fittipaldi said at the Bahrain Grand Prix, "The history of Lotus makes them so special. When Colin Chapman invited me to drive for Lotus it was an honour. The team stopped for a long while but now they are here again and I'm sure they'll have no problems.' At the first practice session of the Bahrain Grand Prix, both Kovalainen and Trulli set times, albeit both slower than Glock's Virgin by 200 and 300 tenths respectively. In qualifying, they qualified 20th and 21st, being out-qualified by Glock. For the new teams, the race was a race of attrition, with both Hispanias and Virgins retiring. Trulli retired on lap 46 due to hydraulic issues, but was classified as he completed more than 90% of the race leader's distance. Kovalainen finished a strong 15th, 2 laps behind race winner Alonso. Kovalainen was the only driver of the 3 new teams to cross the finish line. Tony Fernandes said on Twitter, "What an amazing day. Lotus is back. Two cars finishing."

In Australia, the Lotus cars of Heikki Kovalainen and Trulli lined up in 19th and 20th respectively, with Trulli experiencing a problem with his seat which caused it to bounce in his car. They were ahead of both Virgins and Hispanias. Trulli left his garage, and suffered a hydraulic pump failure on the grid. He attempted to start the race from the pit lane after, but the team was unable to rectify the problem and Trulli did not start. Kovalainen did start, and finished in 13th, ahead of Karun Chandhok, the last finisher.

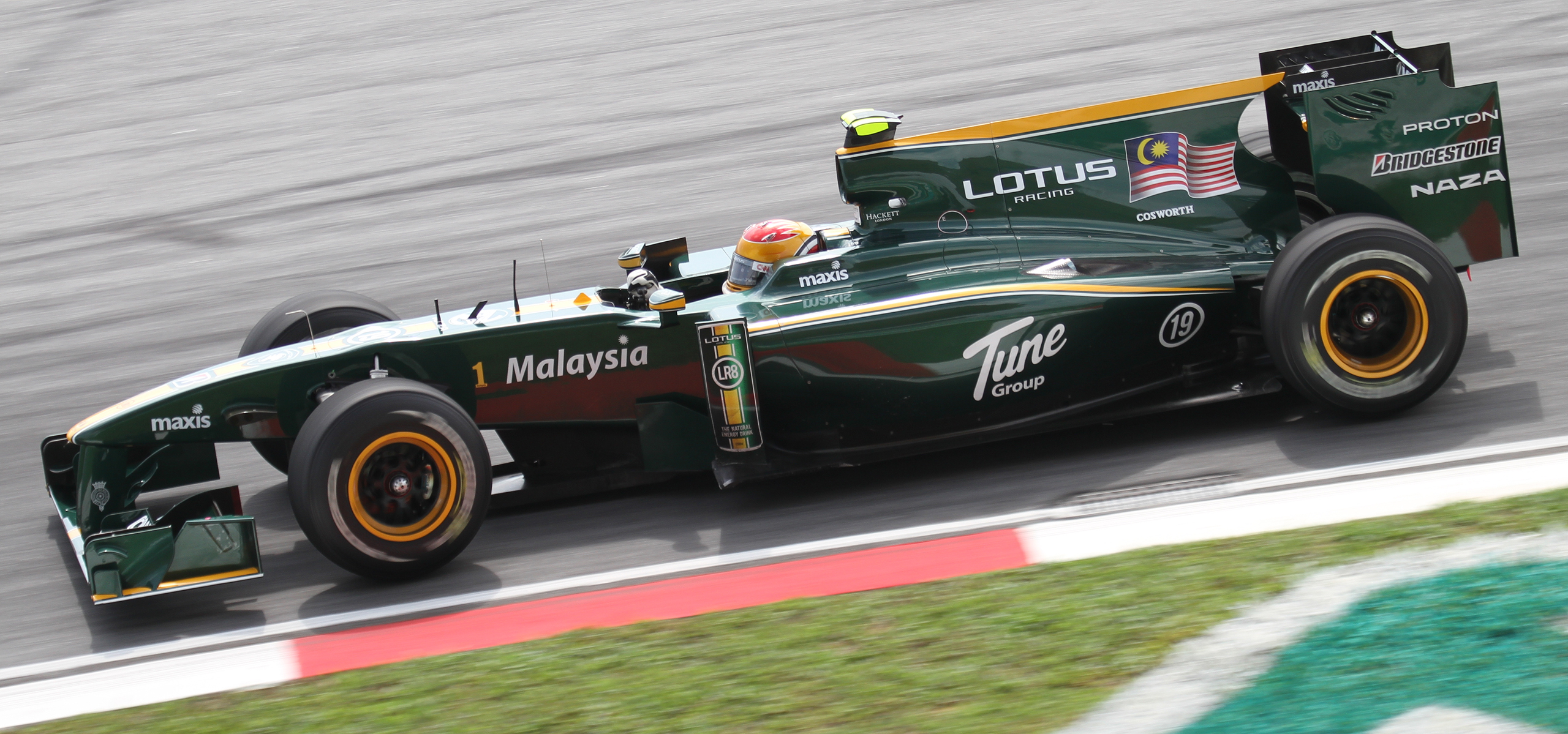
Fairuz Fauzy during Friday practice at the Malaysian Grand Prix; testing a new engine cover.

At practice for the Malaysian Grand Prix, Fauzy replaced Heikki Kovalainen in the first free practice session at the 2010 Malaysian Grand Prix, as Jarno Trulli won a coin toss against Kovalainen. In qualifying, at Lotus Racing's home grand prix, the weather provided numerous high-profile casualties during the early period of the session, as both McLaren and Ferrari drivers inexplicably opted to remain in their garages while the rest of the fieldset banker laps, before the rain arrived. By the time they made their way onto the track, the rain had set in, and it proved impossible to complete a lap good enough to make it into Q2. Kovalainen set a good time in Q1, and was able to beat Trulli into Q2 and out-qualified Glock in Q2, who had also made it in. Kovalainen lined up 15th. He made a good start, although was overtaken by the McLarens and Ferrari's. On lap 20, Kovalainen pitted because he was suffering hydraulic issues. He resumed nine laps adrift of the leader and circulated six laps behind his nearest rival. He ultimately did not complete enough laps to be classified as a finisher, ultimately taking the chequered flag ten laps down. His teammate Trulli collided with Glock on lap 3. Later in the race, he suffered hydraulic issues, but was able to bring it home in 17th, 5 laps down and overtaken by both Hispania's.

In China, they qualified 20th and 21st, out-qualified by Glock once again. When the safety car came out, Kovalainen did not pit, and he ran as high as 6th place, the first time one of the new teams had run in a points-scoring position all season. Kovalainen finished a strong 14th place, while Trulli retired on lap 36 due to yet another hydraulic issue.

At the Spanish Grand Prix first practice session, Kovalainen was once again the fastest of the new teams, his Lotus T127 finishing four seconds slower than Hamilton and less than two behind the Williams of Nico Hülkenberg. Both loti qualified higher than the two Virgin's and Hispania's. Kovalainen, about to start his formation lap, his gearbox software attempted to select two gears at the same time, breaking his gearbox. He pitted before the race started, and the lotus mechanics tried to fix the issue to get him out on a track a couple of laps behind, but soon the mechanics abandoned the plan. Trulli finished ahead of the two Virgin's in 17th. It was now becoming evident that Lotus Racing was faster than Virgin and Hispania.

Following concerns over the tight and narrow nature of the Monaco circuit combined with new teams Virgin Racing, Lotus and Hispania being between three and six seconds slower than the established teams over the course of a lap and therefore creating a very real possibility for a slower car compromising the flying laps of their faster counterparts, the suggestion was put forth to split the first session of qualifying into two groups of twelve cars, similar to the format used by the IndyCar Series. However, at the Spanish Grand Prix, one week before the Monaco race, the proposal was rejected by several teams. The FIA later set a maximum allowable lap time for qualifying, with any car that is slower than one minute and twenty-two seconds between the first and last corners facing penalties from the stewards. Trulli stated that he felt drivers and teams had no cause for complaint if anyone is held up, saying "they have had plenty of time among the teams about what to do for here [Monaco], and they didn't come up with a solution. So I don't think anyone should start complaining now." Heikki Kovalainen was the fastest of the 3 new teams; it was the first time teammate Jarno Trulli was out-qualified at Monaco by his teammate. The Lotus cars were followed by the two Virgins and the two Hispanias. In the race, Trulli had a problem car in the pits, the mechanics took an age to get the nut off his back wheel. This meant he was behind Chandhok. Kovalainen retired on lap 58 with a steering problem, while Trulli caught up to Chandhok. Trulli attempted a pass at Rascasse that resulted in his Lotus mounting Chandhok's car and his wheels narrowly missing Chandhok's head. Chandhok put his hands up to his helmet when Trulli's car came across him – he was lucky he didn't lose them. Both drivers walked away from the crash. The incident occurred just in front of race leader Webber, who avoided being caught up in the tangle. Trulli later apologised to Chandhok.

In Turkey, Lotus débuted a new rear wing specification which improved the forward balance of their chassis. They yet again out-qualified the two other new teams, but both suffered a hydraulics issue, with Trulli grinding to a halt on lap 35, while Kovalainen retired the lap after with a power steering failure, in turn, eight which was followed by him not being able to operate his gearbox, clutch and throttle coming into the pits and his car was pushed into the Lotus garage.

At the Canadian Grand Prix, Trulli stopped in the pit entry on lap forty-seven with terminal brake problems. Kovalainen finished ahead of the new teams.

At the European Grand Prix in Valencia, the team marked the 500th race in the Lotus marque's history. On lap nine, Webber attempted to pass Kovalainen for 17th, by running in his slipstream at 190 miles per hour (310 km/h) on the main straight but the Kovalainen appeared to brake earlier than Webber expected, and the Red Bull made contact with Kovalainen's right-rear wheel, sending him airborne. He struck an advertising hoarding and somersaulted. Webber's car landed on its nose and careered into the turn 12 run-off area at high speed and collided with a tyre barrier. Webber was unhurt. The large force of the accident broke his brake pedal. Kovalainen's rear wing came right off, and he retired. Webber said he had minor cuts and bruises after his lap nine accident with Kovalainen. He said he was unsure about Kovalainen's mindset and thought that the driver would allow him to get ahead. Nevertheless, he did not appropriation blame onto Kovalainen and said the difference between the braking capabilities of both cars caught him out by surprise. Webber later admitted that he misjudged how early Kovalainen would brake for the corner but felt the latter had moved more than once while defending the position. Kovalainen claimed that he had not done anything wrong and blamed Webber for causing the crash. Both drivers were transported to the circuit's medical centre.

During the British Grand Prix, the team was renamed Team Lotus. Lotus brought their final update for 2010 as the team shifted its focus to the 2011 car. It also became known that Lotus were nearing a deal to use Renault engines for the 2011 Formula One season, because of the number of issues involving their transmission system with their car and the Cosworth CA2010. The team also brought the final update to the T127, shifting focus to the 2011 car.

At the German Grand Prix, Trulli suffered gearbox problems, where he could not select 2nd gear, and retired. Kovalainen also retired.

On 24 September 2010, it was announced that Tony Fernandes (Lotus Racing) had acquired the name rights of Team Lotus from David Hunt, marking the official rebirth of Team Lotus in Formula One.

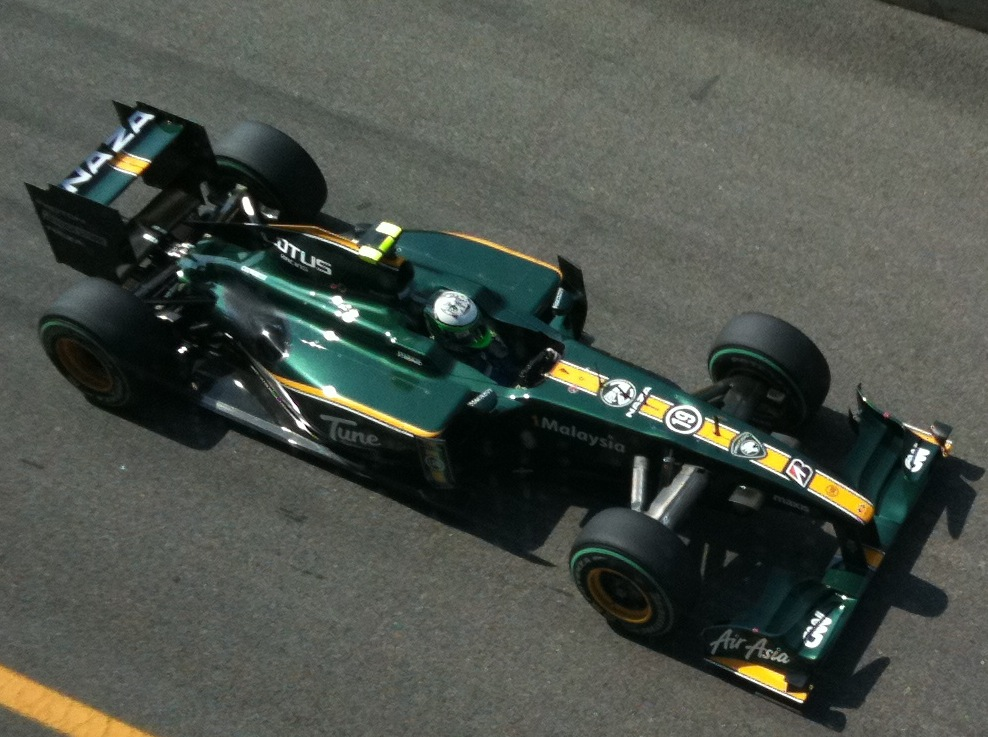
Kovalainen in Italy.

At the Singapore Grand Prix, Trulli drove to the pit lane and was pushed by his mechanics into the Lotus garage to retire with a hydraulic issue on lap 28. Kovalainen and Buemi made contact in the final sector of the lap, with the latter spinning around in front of the Toro Rosso, who was quick to avoid a head-on collision. Kovalainen's car suffered a cracked fuel tank pressure release valve and he limped back to the pit lane, the rear of his Lotus catching fire during the final few turns. Kovalainen aborted the pit entry, but did not make it much further as his car was consumed by the fire. Kovalainen stopped on the main straight and got out of his car to extinguish the fire himself after members of the Williams team handed him a fire extinguisher.

At Japan, Kovalainen had a strong race and was the first of the new teams to cross the line, his 12th position helping to consolidate Lotus' tenth position in the championship, with Trulli in 13th. Kovalainen finished yet again ahead of the new teams in Korea, with 12th.

By the end of the season, even though they did not bring any more updates to the car after Britain, it was evident that Lotus was the clear faster of the three new teams. Even though they suffered a lot of hydraulic problems, their pace was faster than the Virgin Racing and Hispania Racing cars.

== Sponsorship and livery ==
The car features the historic green and gold Lotus single-seater colours. The "1Malaysia" logo appears on the sides of the bodywork, a reminder of the team's Malaysian origins. A Malaysian flag on the engine cover at the Malaysian, Chinese and Belgian Grands Prix. In the first four races, the drivers' overalls were white. From the Spanish Grands Prix onwards, drivers’ overalls were green.

At the European Grand Prix Lotus celebrated the 500th Grand Prix for the brand. For this occasion, the team changed the usual decoration of its car, including the number 500 between laurels on both sides of the rear of the car. The family of Colin Chapman, the founder of the original Team Lotus, attended this celebration.

At the Abu Dhabi Grand Prix, the text "Thank You Lotus Fans" appeared on the car's engine cover.

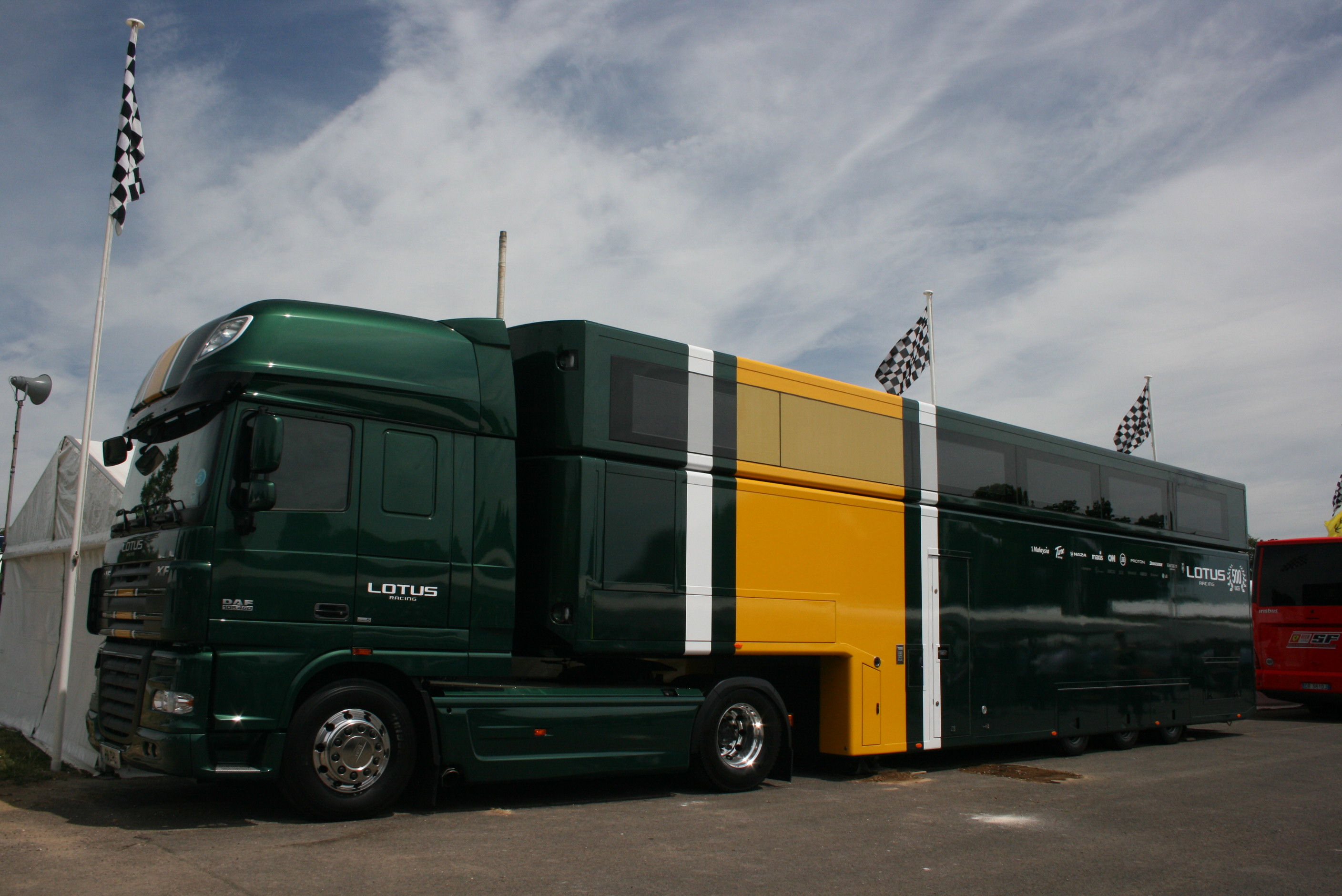
Lotus Racing transporter

== Complete Formula One results ==
(key) (results in bold indicate pole position; races in italics indicate fastest lap)

Year	Entrant	Engine	Tyres	Drivers	1	2	3	4	5	6	7	8	9	10	11	12	13	14	15	16	17	18	19	Points	WCC
2010	Lotus Racing	Cosworth CA2010 V8	**B**		BHR	AUS	MAL	CHN	ESP	MON	TUR	CAN	EUR	GBR	GER	HUN	BEL	ITA	SIN	JPN	KOR	BRA	ABU	0	10th
2010	Lotus Racing	Cosworth CA2010 V8	**B**	(Italy) Jarno Trulli	17^{†}	DNS	17	Ret	17	15^{†}	Ret	Ret	21	16	Ret	15	19	Ret	Ret	13	Ret	19	21^{†}	0	10th
2010	Lotus Racing	Cosworth CA2010 V8	**B**	(Finland) Heikki Kovalainen	15	13	NC	14	DNS	Ret	Ret	16	Ret	17	Ret	14	16	18	16^{†}	12	13	18	17	0	10th

^{†} Driver failed to finish, but was classified as they had completed >90% of the total race distance.
