= Lotus T128 =

Lotus T128 refers to two race cars developed under the Lotus title:

- Lotus T128 (Formula One car), the Formula One car developed by Team Lotus in 2011
- Lotus T128 (Le Mans Prototype), the Le Mans Prototype sports car developed by Kodewa in 2013
