= Lotus Renault =

Lotus Renault or Lotus-Renault may refer to four different Formula One constructors:

- Team Lotus, which used Renault engines between 1983 and 1986 with the constructor name of Lotus-Renault
- Lotus Renault GP, the name of the Renault team in 2011 after acquiring Lotus Cars as a sponsor
- Team Lotus (2010–2011), which used Renault engines in 2011 with the constructor name of Lotus-Renault
- Lotus F1, the Formula One team which used Renault engines from 2012 to 2014 with the constructor name of Lotus-Renault
