= Lotus T128 (Formula One car) =

2011 Formula One racing car

- Jarno Trulli driving the T128 during the Italian Grand Prix
- Category: Formula One
- Constructor: Lotus
- Designers: Mike Gascoyne (Chief Technical Officer); Dieter Gass (Deputy Technical Director); Lewis Butler (Chief Designer); Frank Ramowsky (Head of R&D); Elliot Dason-Barber (Head of Vehicle Dynamics); Marianne Hinson (Head of Aerodynamics)
- Predecessor: Lotus T127
- Successor: Caterham CT01

Technical specifications
- Chassis: carbon-fibre and honeycomb composite monocoque
- Suspension (front): carbon-fibre
- Suspension (rear): carbon-fibre
- Engine: Renault RS27-2011 2,400 cc (146.5 cu in) 90° V8, limited to 18,000 RPM naturally aspirated mid-mounted
- Transmission: Red Bull Technologies Seven-speed semi-automatic gearbox with reverse gear
- Weight: 640 kg (1,411 lb) (including driver)
- Fuel: Total
- Tyres: Pirelli P Zero; BBS Wheels (front and rear): 13"

Competition history
- Notable entrants: Team Lotus
- Notable drivers: 20. (Finland) Heikki Kovalainen; 21. (Italy) Jarno Trulli; 21. (India) Karun Chandhok
- Debut: 2011 Australian Grand Prix
- Last event: 2011 Brazilian Grand Prix
Races	Wins	Podiums	Poles	F/Laps
19	0	0	0	0

The Lotus T128, known prior to its launch by its project number TL11, is a Formula One motor racing car designed by Mike Gascoyne, Lewis Butler and Marianne Hinson for Team Lotus in the 2011 Formula One season. 2011 saw the car abandon its Cosworth engine in favour of one developed by Renault. The T128 was launched online on 31 January 2011. Team Lotus retained an unchanged driver lineup in 2011, with 2010 drivers Heikki Kovalainen and Jarno Trulli racing the T128. It was confirmed that the team would start the season without the Kinetic Energy Recovery System, but senior figures suggested they would adopt it if the car proved successful, however the team continued for the rest of the 2011 season without KERS. The team changed from the Cosworth CA2010 engine used in 2010 to the Renault RS27 series, as well as exchanging a transmission developed by X-Trac to one built by Red Bull Technologies. The design of the T128 also incorporated a "bladed" roll bar similar to the one developed by Mercedes in 2010, but thicker and with sturdier air intakes to conform with FIA regulations.

== Pre-season ==
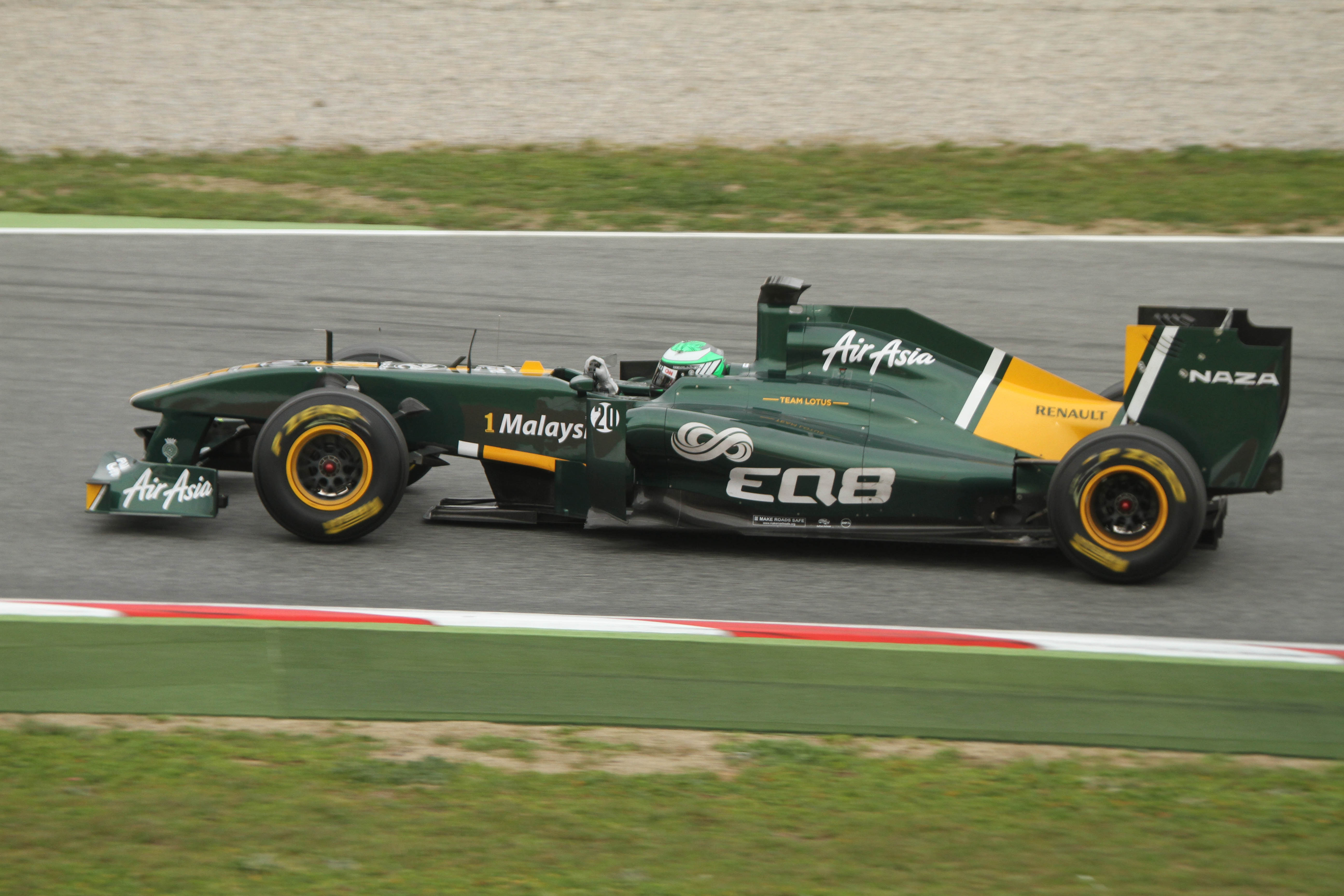
Kovalainen testing the T128 during the pre-season testing

Lotus Racing announced on 5 October 2010 that the team had agreed a deal with Red Bull Technology for the supply of gearboxes and hydraulic systems from 2011 onwards. As part of a major technical team upgrade many Force India staff were leaving their jobs to join the team and aid with car development. On 24 October 2010, the team confirmed that it will build a dedicated wind-tunnel facility at its British base. In addition, the team and its GP2 outfit Team AirAsia will expand operations at the existing factory site to take over a further two units, giving Team Air Asia a permanent home alongside the Lotus operation. On 5 November 2010, the team confirmed an engine full-works partnership for the next two years with Renault.

On 30 November 2010, the FIA released the entry list for the 2011 season in which Lotus Racing were listed under the "Team Lotus" name. To show that the team was pressing ahead with its plans, they rebranded their factory, changed their official website and introduced a new team logo. Chief executive Riad Asmat announced that he expected the car to be a genuine midfield runner and challenge for point-scoring positions. Jarno Trulli said that the Lotus-sponsored Renault team had given Team Lotus plenty of motivation to perform more consistently.

Team Lotus skipped the first day of the Valencia test opting to carry out a private test day at the end of the week instead. It was a good call as a power steering issue dogged the car after its roll out on Wednesday. It limited most of the test to looking at launch systems, aero testing and basic systems checks. It also meant that the team was lacking on long runs and tyre data (it was running too slowly to really work the rubber).

== 2011 season ==
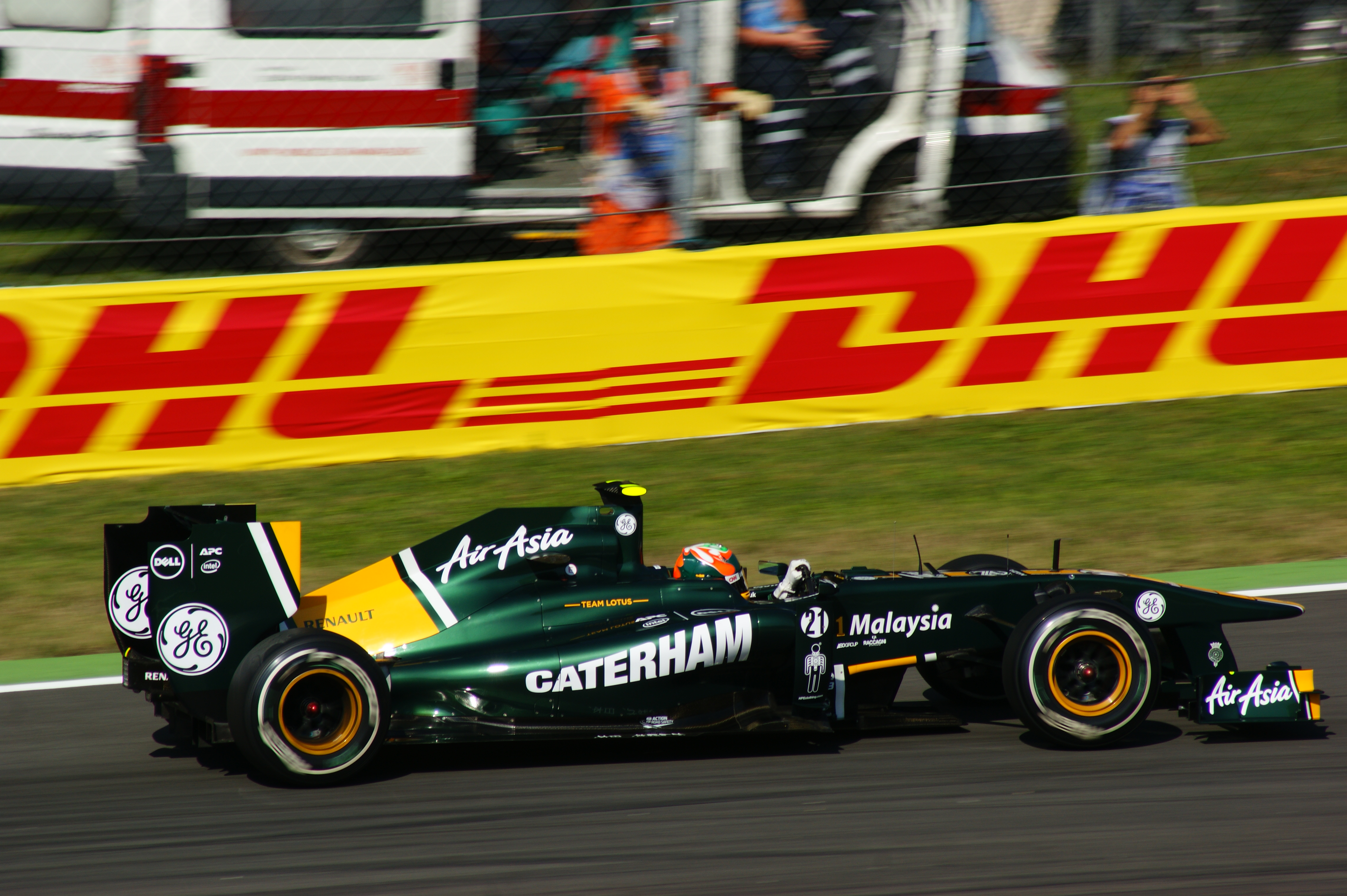
Chandhok raced for the team during the German Grand Prix and tested the T128 several times in 2011 (pictured during the Italian Grand Prix.

In qualifying for the first race, the Australian Grand Prix, Team Lotus were eliminated in Q1, causing surprise within the team, who had expected to be much closer to the midfield, although they were ahead of both Virgins and HRTs. In the race, Kovalainen retired on lap 19 due to a water leak, while Trulli finished 13th, ahead of d'Ambrosio.

Throughout the season, the T128 was faster than the Virgin cars and HRTs.

== Sponsorship and livery ==
The livery was similar to the previous season's design with subtle changes. EQ8 Energy Drink, owned by Tony Fernandes, became the team's new sponsor. A Malaysian flag was displayed on the rear wing at the Malaysian Grand Prix. Prior to the naming dispute over the Lotus Renault GP and Lotus Cars, the Caterham logo and new livery was added to the cars from the 2011 British Grand Prix onwards.

As a tribute to the Tōhoku earthquake and tsunami, a message carried on the sidepods and used in occasion.

At the Abu Dhabi and Brazilian Grands Prix, the logo of the football club Queens Park Rangers could be seen on the side of the car's cockpit and on top of the sidepod.

== Complete Formula One results ==
(key) (results in bold indicate pole position; results in italics indicate fastest lap)

Year	Entrant	Engine	Tyres	Drivers	1	2	3	4	5	6	7	8	9	10	11	12	13	14	15	16	17	18	19	Points	WCC
2011	Team Lotus	Renault RS27 V8	**P**		AUS	MAL	CHN	TUR	ESP	MON	CAN	EUR	GBR	GER	HUN	BEL	ITA	SIN	JPN	KOR	IND	ABU	BRA	0	10th
2011	Team Lotus	Renault RS27 V8	**P**	Kovalainen	Ret	15	16	19	Ret	14	Ret	19	Ret	16	Ret	15	13	16	18	14	14	17	16	0	10th
2011	Team Lotus	Renault RS27 V8	**P**	Trulli	13	Ret	19	18	18	13	16	20	Ret		Ret	14	14	Ret	19	17	19	18	18	0	10th
2011	Team Lotus	Renault RS27 V8	**P**	Chandhok	TD			TD				TD	TD	20			TD		TD	TD	TD			0	10th
