= Team Lotus (2010–2011) =

Former Anglo-Malaysian Formula One constructor

Lotus
- Full name: Team Lotus (2011); Lotus Racing (2010)
- Base: Hingham, Norfolk, United Kingdom
- Team principal(s): Tony Fernandes
- Noted staff: Riad Asmat; Tony Fernandes; Mike Gascoyne; Keith Saunt
- Noted drivers: (Finland) Heikki Kovalainen (Italy) Jarno Trulli (India) Karun Chandhok
- Next name: Caterham F1 Team

Formula One World Championship career
- First entry: 2010 Bahrain Grand Prix
- Races entered: 38
- Engines: Cosworth, Renault
- Constructors' Championships: 0
- Drivers' Championships: 0
- Race victories: 0
- Podiums: 0
- Points: 0
- Pole positions: 0
- Fastest laps: 0
- Final entry: 2011 Brazilian Grand Prix

Team Lotus, originally Lotus Racing, was a Malaysian-licensed Formula One racing team and constructor, based in Hingham, Norfolk, UK, which competed during the 2010 and 2011 Formula One seasons. The team scored no championship points in the two years it competed.

The team was set up by a group of Malaysian businessmen led by Tony Fernandes using a licence from Lotus Cars owner Proton, for the use of the Lotus name in Formula One. It was run by a company called the 1Malaysia F1 Team Sdn Bhd then. The team gained its entry after the withdrawal of the BMW team in 2009. After having that licence terminated for further seasons, the team bought the historic Team Lotus brand in the 2011 season.

The Caterham Group was set up after Fernandes purchased British sportscar manufacturer Caterham Cars. Team Lotus, although forming part of the group, continued to compete under the Lotus name for the 2011 Formula One season. The team's name was eventually changed to "Caterham F1 Team" at the end of 2011, it also competed under the Caterham brand in conjunction with the Caterham Racing Junior Team which competed in the GP2 Series.

== History ==
The FIA announced its intention to open up the grid, aiming for a total of 13 teams, and in July 2009 selected three new teams from 15 new applicants, as well as confirming the entry of all 10 existing teams. The existing F1 teams, under the FOTA organisation, are understood to have agreed a system of technical support to assist new teams. This compromise proposal would involve the supply of parts and design knowledge to the new entrants, but not full customer cars, in return for which the budget cap idea was dropped.

Following the 1994 collapse – but before the end of that season – the rights to the name Team Lotus were purchased by David Hunt, brother of former F1 champion James Hunt. In 2009, when the FIA announced an intention to invite entries for a budget-limited championship in 2010, Litespeed acquired the right to submit an entry under the historic name Lotus Cars. The sister company of the original Team Lotus, distanced itself from the new entry and announced its willingness to take action to protect its name and reputation if necessary. When the 2010 entry list was released on 12 June 2009, the Litespeed Team Lotus entry was not one of those selected.

=== Formation ===
The original team logo used during 2010.

The Litespeed F3 team approached Malaysian entrepreneur Tony Fernandes, who already sponsored the Williams team through his AirAsia airline. Litespeed F3 had previously made their own bid to enter the 2010 season with the Team Lotus name, but were not awarded an entry. Lotus Racing's debut marked the return of the Lotus name as a constructor to Formula One for the first time since 1994, when the original British company Team Lotus stopped competing in Formula One.

Founded as Lotus Racing, the team was operated by 1Malaysia Racing Team Sdn. Bhd., a privately funded project jointly owned by Tune Group and Naza Group, in partnership with the Malaysian Government and a consortium of Malaysian entrepreneurs. Proton, the Malaysian car company which owns Lotus Cars, gave permission for the team to use the Lotus brand in Formula One. The Malaysian Government emphasised that the government itself is not going to invest in the team and that the Malaysian government's investment is only through Proton. Dubbed as 1Malaysia F1 team, the project is part of the 1Malaysia initiative, intended to promote unity amongst Malaysians.

Fernandes, founder and CEO of the Malaysian-based Tune Group, owner of the AirAsia airline, started as the team principal. Having initially planned to stand down from the role once the season begins, he later indicated that he would carry on in this position. The team's technical director was Mike Gascoyne, who had teamed up with Litespeed F3 for their initial application. Team shareholders SM Nasarudin (CEO and executive chairman of Naza Group) and Kamarudin Meranun (the co-founder with Fernandes of AirAsia and Tune Group) were appointed as deputy team principals.

Riad Asmat was appointed as the chief executive officer of 1Malaysia F1 Team Sdn. Bhd. Asmat was formerly working in the managing director's office of Proton Holdings Berhad as general manager. In Proton Holdings Berhad in 2006, Riad was tasked with the development of its motorsports programme, including the company's involvement in A1 Team Malaysia. Keith Saunt was appointed as Chief Operating Officer of the team and has been selected to manage the technical organisation in Britain reporting directly to Mike Gascoyne. Saunt was tasked with overseeing technical operations on a day-to-day basis at the team's facility in Hingham, Norfolk. His previous experience included senior roles with the original Team Lotus, Benetton Formula, Renault F1 and most recently Red Bull Racing, where he held the role of chief operating officer and director of Red Bull Technology.

The team was based at the RTN (Racing Technology Norfolk Ltd.) facility in Norfolk, UK, 10 miles (16 km) from the Lotus Cars factory. The team's future design, R&D, manufacturing and technical centre was initially to be a purpose-built facility at Malaysia's Sepang International Circuit, but Fernandes later stated that the team would in fact remain in Norfolk.

Being Malaysian-owned, the team promoted and respected Malaysian customs including the serving of Halal food and Malaysian cuisine by dedicated chefs, including celebrity Malaysian chef Norman Musa.

=== 2010 season ===
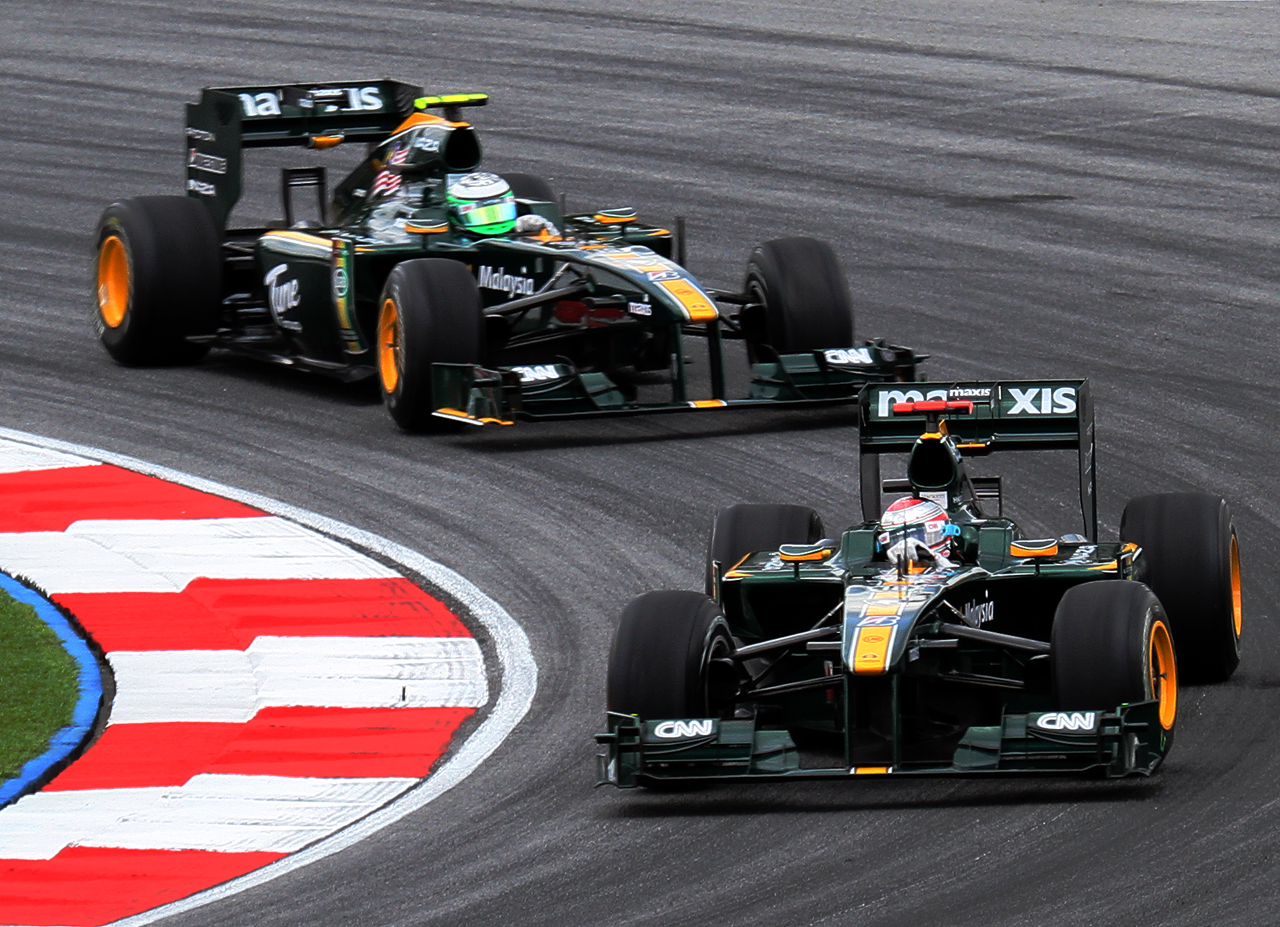
Jarno Trulli leads Heikki Kovalainen during practice for the 2010 Malaysian Grand Prix.

Following the team's late acceptance into F1 following BMW Sauber's departure Gascoyne said "We've got a great heritage that we've got to live up to". He also said they wanted to rival the debut of Brawn GP but said that would be a greater challenge as the Brawn team already had a car ready for racing and all they needed was financing. He also mentioned the main objective was to have a car on the grid in Bahrain at 2010.

Development of the 2010 car started late, due to the late acceptance of the team's entry. On 14 September 2009, the first four people started work, with the factory being bare, empty and old. When Kovalainen first visited the Lotus factory, people were still building the walls and floors. Gascoyne phoned some people he knew to help at the factory. By November, they had a mock engine design. Working with Fondtech on aerodynamics, the team used engines supplied by Cosworth, and gearboxes from Xtrac. The design was revealed in October 2009 at the start of the wind tunnel programme. On 17 November, Gascoyne and Fernandes gave a joint interview saying they're "feeling the pressure of the famous name".

On 14 December 2009, the team announced their drivers for their debut season as former Toyota driver Jarno Trulli and McLaren's Heikki Kovalainen. Malaysian driver Fairuz Fauzy was also confirmed as the team's test and reserve driver.

The 2010 car, named the T127, was given a private shakedown at Silverstone by Fauzy on 9 February 2010. The car was then officially launched in London on 12 February 2010.

Trulli stressed they will have to progress one step at a time. "We are one of the new teams, so we have to prove ourselves and to gain respect in the paddock. We have to establish ourselves as the best of the new teams and see what gap we have between us and the rest. Only then will we really understand what gains we need to make."

Lotus Racing made their debut at the Bahrain Grand Prix, At the first practice session of the Bahrain grand Prix, both Kovalainen and Trulli set times, albeit both slower than Glock's Virgin by 200 and 300 tenths respectively. In qualifying, they qualified 21st and 22nd, being outqualified by Glock. For the new teams, the race was a race of attrition, with both Hispania's and Virgins retiring. Trulli retired on lap 46 due to hydraulic issues, but was classified as he completed more than 90% of the race leaders distance. Kovalainen finished a strong 15th, 2 laps behind race winner Alonso. Kovalainen was the only driver of the 3 new teams to cross the finish line. Tony Fernandes said on Twitter, "What an amazing day. Lotus is back. Two cars finishing."

In qualifying for the Australia Grand Prix, Trulli experiencing a problem with his seat which caused it to bounce in his car. Trulli left his garage, and suffered a hydraulic pump failure on the grid. He attempted to start the race from the pit lane after, but the team were unable to rectify the problem and Trulli did not start. Kovalainen did start, and finished in 13th, ahead of Karun Chandhok, the last finisher.

At qualifying for the Malaysian grand Prix, Lotus Racing's home grand prix, the weather provided numerous high-profile casualties during the early period of the session, as both McLaren and Ferrari drivers inexplicably opted to remain in their garages while the rest of the field set banker laps, before the rain arrived. By the time they made their way onto the track, the rain had set in, and it proved impossible to complete a lap good enough to make it into Q2. Kovalainen set a good time in Q1, and was able to beat Trulli into Q2 and outqualified Glock in Q2, who had also made it in. Kovalainen lined up 15th, but suffered a hydraulic issue during the race. He pulled into the pits, and 9 laps later left the pits. He crossed the line, but was not classified. Trulli also suffered hydraulic issues but finished in 17th, 5 laps down.

By Spain, it was becoming evident that Lotus Racing were faster than the Virgin racing and Hispania Racing cars, Outqualifying them But Kovalainen yet again suffered a hydraulic failure just before the start of the race and did not start. Trulli finished 17th, ahead of the two Virgin cars.

At Monaco, Lotus yet again outqualified Virgin and Hispania. In the race, Trulli had a problem car in the pits, the mechanics took an age to get the nut off his back wheel. This meant he was behind Chandhok. Kovalainen retired on lap 58 with a steering problem, while Trulli caught up to Chandhok. Trulli attempted a pass at Rascasse that resulted in his Lotus mounting Chandhok's car and his wheels narrowly missing Chandhok's head. Chandhok put his hands up to his helmet when Trulli's car came across him - he was lucky he didn't lose them. Both drivers walked away from the crash. The incident occurred just in front of race leader Webber, who avoided being caught up in the tangle. Trulli later apologised to Chandhok.

In Turkey, Lotus débuted a new rear wing specification which improved forward balance of their chassis. They yet again outqualified the two other new teams, but both suffered a hydraulics issue, with Trulli grinding to a halt on lap 35, while Kovalainen retired the lap after with a power steering failure in turn eight which was followed by him not being able to operate his gearbox, clutch and throttle coming into the pits and his car was pushed into the Lotus garage.

At the European Grand Prix in Valencia, the team marked the 500th race in the Lotus marque's history. On lap nine, Webber attempted to pass Kovalainen for 17th, by running in his slipstream at 190 miles per hour (310 km/h) on the main straight but the Kovalainen appeared to brake earlier than Webber expected, and the Red Bull made contact with Kovalainen's right-rear wheel, sending him airborne. He struck an advertising hoarding and somersaulted. Webber's car landed on its nose and careered into the turn 12 run-off area at high speed and collided with a tyre barrier. Webber was unhurt. The large force of the accident broke his brake pedal. Kovalainen's rear wing came right off, and he retired. Webber said he had minor cuts and bruises after his lap nine accident with Kovalainen. He said he was unsure about Kovalainen's mindset and thought that the driver would allow him to get ahead. Nevertheless, he did not appropriation blame onto Kovalainen and said the difference between the braking capabilities of both cars caught him out by surprise. Webber later admitted that he misjudged how early Kovalainen would brake for the corner but felt the latter had moved more than once while defending the position. Kovalainen claimed that he had not done anything wrong and blamed Webber for causing the crash. Both drivers were transported to the circuit's medical centre.

During the British Grand Prix the team was renamed to Team Lotus. It also became known that Lotus were nearing a deal to use Renault engines for the 2011 Formula One season, because of the number of issues involving their transmission system with their car and the Cosworth CA2010. The team also brought the final update to the T127, shifting focus to the 2011 car.

In Belgium, Kovalainen made it into Q2 for the second time in the season, after Malaysia.

At the Singapore Grand Prix, Trulli drove to the pit lane and was pushed by his mechanics into the Lotus garage to retire with a hydraulic issue on lap 28. Kovalainen and Buemi made contact in the final sector of the lap, with the former spinning around in front of the Toro Rosso, who was quick to avoid a head-on collision. Kovalainen's car suffered a cracked fuel tank pressure release valve and he limped back to the pit lane, the rear of his Lotus catching fire during the final few turns. Kovalainen aborted the pit entry, but did not make it much further as his car was consumed by the fire. Kovalainen stopped on the main straight and got out of his car to extinguish the fire himself after members of the Williams team handed him a fire extinguisher.

At Japan, Kovalainen had a strong race and was the first of the new teams to cross the line, his 12th position helping to consolidate Lotus' tenth position in the championship, with Trulli in 13th. This meant lotus beat fellow new teams Hispania and Virgin.

On 16 December 2009, Fernandes accepted a "challenge" from Richard Branson, a fellow airline boss and the owner of Lotus' fellow F1 newcomers Virgin Racing. The losing team's boss would work on the winner's airline for a day dressed as a stewardess. Fernandes joked "The sexier the better. Our passengers will be delighted to be served by a Knight of the Realm, but knowing Richard, the real challenge will be to prevent him from asking our guests 'coffee, tea or me?' That would be scary." In addition, the team produced a poster depicting Branson in an Air Asia uniform. However, the date of the flight was delayed several times: first because of Branson breaking his leg, then because of the royal wedding, finally because of a fire at the Necker Island. On 19 December 2012, Fernandes announced that Branson would honour his bet in May 2013. Branson ultimately honoured the bet on 13 May 2013.

=== 2011 season ===
Lotus Racing announced on 5 October 2010 that the team had agreed a deal with Red Bull Technology for the supply of gearboxes and hydraulic systems from 2011 onwards. As part of a major technical team upgrade many Force India staff were leaving their jobs to join the team and aid with car development. On 24 October 2010, the team confirmed that it will build a dedicated wind-tunnel facility at its British base. In addition, the team and its GP2 outfit Team AirAsia will expand operations at the existing factory site to take over a further two units, giving Team Air Asia a permanent home alongside the Lotus operation. On 5 November 2010, the team confirmed an engine partnership for the next two years with Renault.

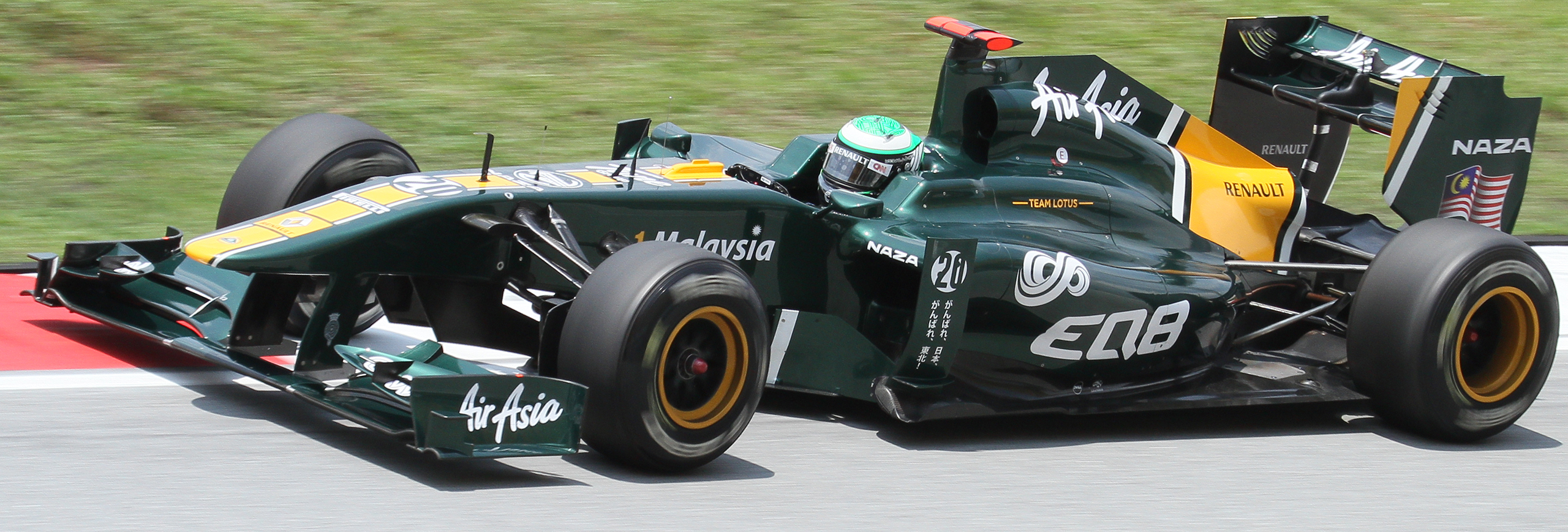
Kovalainen at the 2011 Malaysian Grand Prix.

On 30 November 2010, the FIA released the entry list for the 2011 season in which Lotus Racing were listed under the "Team Lotus" name. To show that the team was pressing ahead with its plans, they rebranded their factory, changed their official website and introduced a new team logo. Chief executive Riad Asmat announced that he expected the car to be a genuine midfield runner and challenge for point-scoring positions. Jarno Trulli said that the Lotus-sponsored Renault team had given Team Lotus plenty of motivation to perform more consistently. Lotus announced that they were going to launch their new car, the Lotus T128 – online, instead of a physical launch, and was unveiled online on 31 January 2011.

On 11 March 2011, it was confirmed that Luiz Razia and Davide Valsecchi – drivers for Lotus's sister outfit Team AirAsia in the GP2 Series – would join the team as third driver and test driver respectively, and will take part in a number of Friday practice sessions during the season. Ricardo Teixeira also joined as a second test driver. On 22 March 2011, Karun Chandhok also joined as the team's reserve driver.

Although the relative pace of the T128 was an improvement on that of its predecessor, the team were unable to bridge the gap to the lower midfield over the course of the season, generally being slower than closest rivals Toro Rosso and Williams but solidly ahead of HRT and Marussia Virgin, with Kovalainen's performances putting him under the gaze of rival teams.

== Use of Lotus name ==
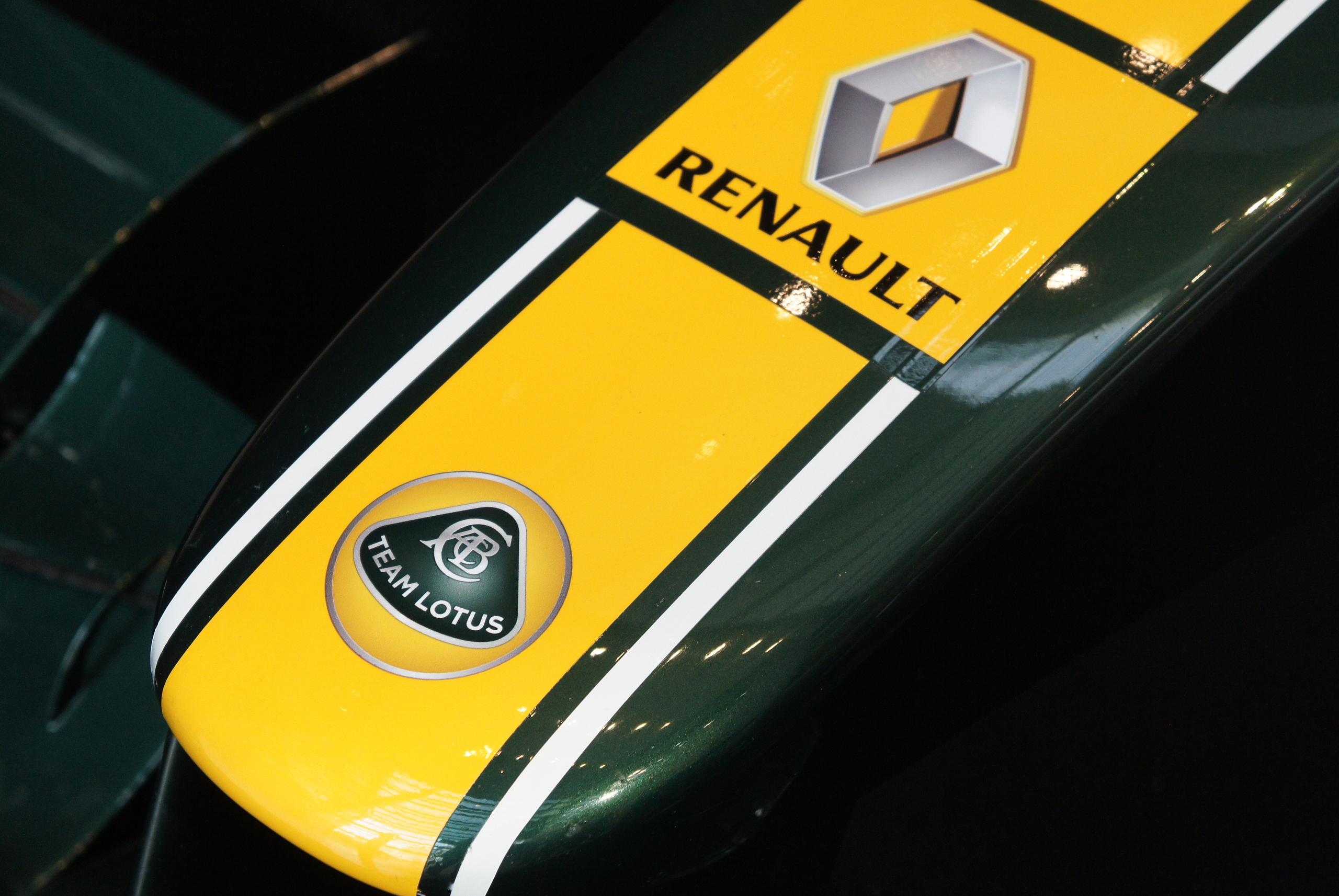
The team was renamed "Team Lotus" for the 2011 season, bringing the famous name back into Formula One.

The team originally took a licence from Group Lotus (owner of Lotus Cars) that allowed them to use the Lotus name for the 2010 season. In September 2010, Group Lotus, with agreement from their parent company Proton, terminated the licence for future seasons as a result of what it called "flagrant and persistent breaches of the licence by the team".

On 24 September 2010 Tony Fernandes announced in a press release that his Tune Group had acquired Team Lotus Ventures Ltd, the company led by David Hunt since 1994 when Team Lotus had stopped competing in Formula One, and with it full ownership of the rights of the Team Lotus brand and heritage. The team confirmed that they would be known as Team Lotus from 2011 onwards.

In September 2010, it was announced that Tony Fernandes would be expanding his interests to include a GP2 Series team, to be known as Team Air Asia, named for one of Fernandes's companies, Air Asia. There is already a Lotus Racing supported team known as Lotus Junior Team in the Formula Renault 3.5 Series. However, while it was announced that Team Air Asia would be joining the GP2 grid, fellow GP2 team ART Grand Prix announced a joint venture with Lotus Cars, with their GP2 and GP3 teams to be renamed "Lotus ART" from 2011 onwards in a similar arrangement to the one that has seen Lotus Cars sponsoring Takuma Sato and KV Racing Technology in the IndyCar Series.

Lotus Cars launched legal action against Lotus Racing, claiming that Tony Fernandes did not have the rights to use the Lotus name because David Hunt was never in a position to sell them. Some commentators even went so far as to suggest that this was an attempt by Lotus Cars to force Fernandes to stop using the Lotus name with a view to launching a second Lotus effort in Formula 1 in conjunction with ART Grand Prix; ART had previously submitted a tender to join the 2011 Formula One grid, but withdrew after failing to secure a budget. With the support of Lotus Cars, ART would have the funding needed to enter Formula One.

On 27 September 2010, Proton issued a statement saying that Group Lotus owned all rights to the Lotus name in the automotive sector, including Formula One, and that Fernandes has no rights to use the brand in the 2011 season. Fernandes did however state that the team will go to court if necessary to protect the brand name.

On 8 December 2010, Group Lotus announced that they had bought a stake in Renault F1 and had agreed to become title sponsor, with the French car maker retiring to the role of engine supplier. The team would be known as "Lotus Renault GP", creating a unique situation whereby the 2011 Formula One grid would see two teams known as Lotus and powered by Renault engines lining up to race. To further the confusion, Group Lotus announced that the 2011 Lotus Renault GP cars would carry a black and gold livery reminiscent of the John Player & Sons liveries previously used by Colin Chapman's Team Lotus in the 1980s, paralleling plans by Tony Fernandes to race in 2011 with a JPS-inspired livery. However, on 11 December 2010, Tony Fernandes stated that it was "ludicrous" to run his squad in the same colours as Lotus Renault GP, and thus his team would continue with their present green and yellow colour scheme in 2011.

On 23 December 2010, Clive Chapman – the son of Lotus founder Colin Chapman – released, on behalf of the Chapman family – including Colin's widow, Hazel – a statement expressing their unequivocal support for Group Lotus in the ongoing dispute over the use of the Lotus name in Formula One and declaring that the family would "prefer that the Team Lotus name should not be used in Formula One."

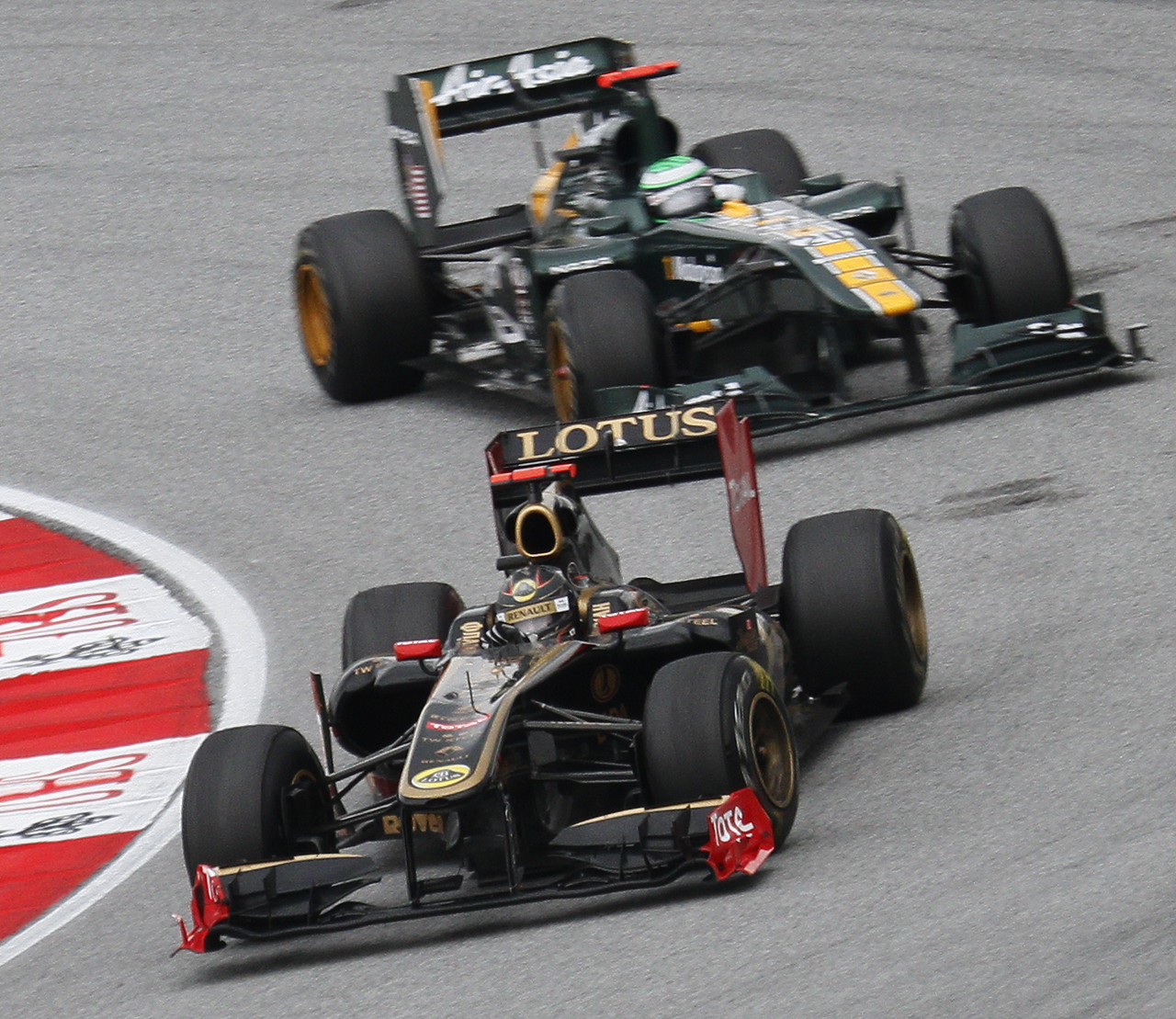
Nick Heidfeld (Lotus Renault GP) leads Kovalainen (Team Lotus) in the 2011 Malaysian Grand Prix.

On 24 January 2011, a judge at the High Court of Justice in London set a trial date over the naming dispute for 21 March, which means that two teams – Team Lotus and the Group Lotus-sponsored Renault outfit – began the 2011 season with Lotus signage. The case did not revolve around the ownership of the name, but rather over the termination of the contract between Fernandes and Group Lotus. Lotus Racing completed the 2010 season with a name used under licence from Group Lotus. The licence was terminated after one year, with Group Lotus claiming that Fernandes had breached the terms of the contract in using the name and image of Lotus Cars, and so were free to terminate it; Fernandes, on the other hand, claimed that Group Lotus had wrongfully terminated the contract. The purpose of the March hearing is to determine whether or not the licensing contract was wrongfully terminated. The hearing over the ownership of the Team Lotus name took place later in the year.

At the launch of the Renault R31 in Valencia, Spain, Lotus Renault GP owner Gérard Lopez expressed frustration over the situation and suggested that the dispute was not over the rights to a team name or the heritage of the Lotus name, but over the television rights paid out annually to the teams by Formula One Management. Commentators suggest that Fernandes and his team would be eligible for as much as $36 million for finishing tenth in the 2010 World Constructors' Championship standings, which they would stand to lose if they changed their name.

On the eve of the High Court hearing in March 2011, David Hunt claimed that Tony Fernandes had refused to honour his contractual obligations in purchasing the Team Lotus name and was attempting to renegotiate the contract with terms that Hunt described as "ludicrous". Hunt issued an ultimatum, stating that if Fernandes did not honour the original contract, then Hunt would not support him in his case against Group Lotus, which he claimed had "[some] potentially serious holes". Team Lotus went into the 2011 Australian Grand Prix with David Hunt's support in their case against Group Lotus having made a U-turn on his previous criticisms of Fernandes and the team.

=== Result ===
On 27 May 2011, the High Court ruled that the team would be able to continue using the "Team Lotus" name and Team Lotus roundel, but could not use "Lotus" on its own. The ruling confirmed Fernandes as the owner of the Team Lotus name, having bought the rights to the name from Hunt. The court ruling stated that Group Lotus had sole right to use the name "Lotus" on its own, and could enter Formula One using "Lotus" for a team name, the black and gold livery, and the Lotus roundel. Team Lotus was told to pay damages after being found in breach of the licensing agreement made with Group Lotus, which had seen the team compete as "Lotus Racing" during the 2010 season.

In July 2011, the two parties returned to the High Court, seeking to resolve the issue altogether. Justice Peter Smith expressed discontent towards Tony Fernandes and Team Lotus after Fernandes had made no mention of his purchase of Caterham Cars during the initial hearings. Furthermore, Fernandes had claimed that Caterham would remain entirely separate from Team Lotus, but a promotional video for the company showing Fernandes wearing Team Lotus apparel. Justice Smith commented that had this material been submitted at the original hearing, then it would have had the potential to influence him enough to rule differently in May.

== Complete Formula One results ==
(key) (results in bold indicate pole position; races in italics indicate fastest lap)

Year	Chassis	Engine	Tyres	Drivers	1	2	3	4	5	6	7	8	9	10	11	12	13	14	15	16	17	18	19	Points	WCC
2010	T127	Cosworth CA2010 2.4 V8	B		BHR	AUS	MAL	CHN	ESP	MON	TUR	CAN	EUR	GBR	GER	HUN	BEL	ITA	SIN	JPN	KOR	BRA	ABU	0	10th
2010	T127	Cosworth CA2010 2.4 V8	B	(Italy) Jarno Trulli	17^{†}	DNS	17	Ret	17	15^{†}	Ret	Ret	21	16	Ret	15	19	Ret	Ret	13	Ret	19	21^{†}	0	10th
2010	T127	Cosworth CA2010 2.4 V8	B	(Finland) Heikki Kovalainen	15	13	NC	14	DNS	Ret	Ret	16	Ret	17	Ret	14	16	18	16^{†}	12	13	18	17	0	10th
2011	T128	Renault RS27-2011 2.4 V8	P		AUS	MAL	CHN	TUR	ESP	MON	CAN	EUR	GBR	GER	HUN	BEL	ITA	SIN	JPN	KOR	IND	ABU	BRA	0	10th
2011	T128	Renault RS27-2011 2.4 V8	P	(Finland) Heikki Kovalainen	Ret	15	16	19	Ret	14	Ret	19	Ret	16	Ret	15	13	16	18	14	14	17	16	0	10th
2011	T128	Renault RS27-2011 2.4 V8	P	(Italy) Jarno Trulli	13	Ret	19	18	18	13	16	20	Ret		Ret	14	14	Ret	19	17	19	18	18	0	10th
2011	T128	Renault RS27-2011 2.4 V8	P	(India) Karun Chandhok										20										0	10th

Notes

- ^{†} – The driver did not finish the Grand Prix, but was classified, as he completed over 90% of the race distance.

== Driver development programme ==
During the team's time in F1, a driver development program was established as part of a joint initiative between Team Lotus and AirAsia. Alexander Rossi, who would go on to become Caterham's test driver in 2012, was the only driver of the programme to graduate to F1. The drivers included:

=== Former drivers ===
Driver	Years	Current series	Titles achieved as Team Lotus driver
(United States) Alexander Rossi	2010–2011	IndyCar Series	none as Team Lotus development program member
(United Kingdom) Matt Parry	2010–2011	None	Super 1 National - Rotax Max Junior
(Malaysia) Weiron Tan	2011	None	Lotus GT4 Supercup Asia
(Singapore) Daim Hishamuddin	2011	None	Rotax Max Challenge Singapore - Junior
(Thailand) Tanart Sathienthirakul	2011	Asian Le Mans Series	none as Team Lotus development program member
(Denmark) Max Klinkby-Silver	2011	None	none as Team Lotus development program member
(Indonesia) Senna Iriawan	2011	None	none as Team Lotus development program member

== See also ==
- Caterham F1
