= Riad Asmat =

Malaysian businessman

Riad Asmat is a Malaysian businessman. He is the son of Perodua Chairman Tan Sri Datuk Asmat Kamaludin.

== Career ==
The team announced the appointment of Asmat as the chief executive officer of 1Malaysia F1 Team Sdn. Bhd. (1MF1T). Asmat, 38 years old, was formerly working in the managing director's office of Proton Holdings Berhad as general manager. In Proton Holdings Berhad in 2006. Asmat also managed the company's involvement in A1 Team Malaysia.

As of January 2018, Asmat is CEO of Air Asia Group.

=== Motorsport ===
He is the former CEO of the Caterham F1 Team and Team Principal of the Caterham Racing GP2 team. Tony Fernandes and fellow shareholders Kamarudin Meranun and SM Nasarudin later promoted Asmat to Group CEO of Caterham Group for Caterham F1 Team, Caterham Cars, Caterham Racing, merchandising, engineering and all related interests.
