= 2010 Malaysian Grand Prix =

Race 3 of 19 in the 2010 Formula One World Championship
← Previous race	Next race →

Race details
- Date: 4 April 2010
- Official name: 2010 Formula 1 Petronas Malaysian Grand Prix
- Location: Sepang International Circuit; Sepang, Selangor, Malaysia
- Course: Permanent racing facility
- Course length: 5.543 km (3.444 miles)
- Distance: 56 laps, 310.408 km (192.879 miles)
- Weather: Mainly cloudy, dry
- Attendance: 97,864 (Weekend)

Pole position
Driver	(Australia) Mark Webber	Red Bull-Renault
- Time: 1:49.327

Fastest lap
Driver	(Australia) Mark Webber	Red Bull-Renault
- Time: 1:37.054 on lap 53

Podium
First	(Germany) Sebastian Vettel	Red Bull-Renault
Second	(Australia) Mark Webber	Red Bull-Renault
Third	(Germany) Nico Rosberg	Mercedes

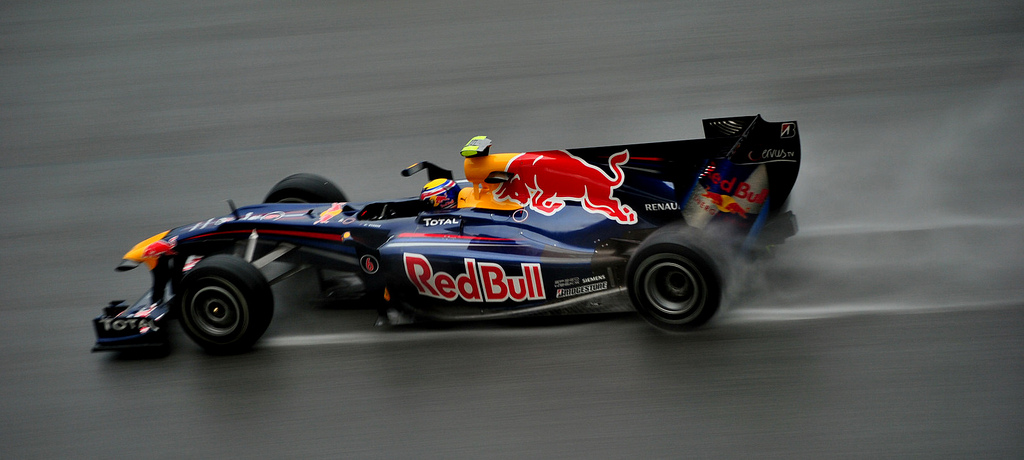
Mark Webber claimed his second career pole position, being the solitary person on intermediate tyres during the third part of qualifying.

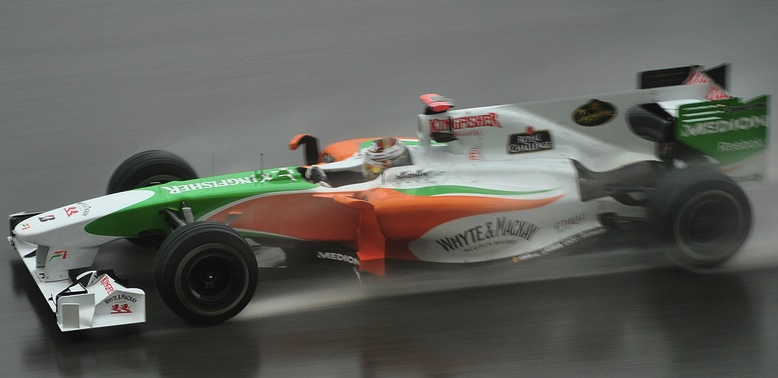
Adrian Sutil started fourth for Force India.

The 2010 Malaysian Grand Prix (formally the 2010 Formula 1 Petronas Malaysian Grand Prix) was the third round in the 2010 Formula One season. It was held in Sepang, Malaysia on 4 April 2010.

The race was won by Sebastian Vettel leading a one-two finish for the Red Bull-Renault team with Mark Webber coming in second place. Vettel's first win of the season enabled him to advance four places in the Drivers' Championship, sitting on third with 37 points and matching the points total of Alonso who lost the lead of the championship to his teammate Massa, trailing the Brazilian by just two points. Meanwhile, Button dropped down to fourth with 35 points, tied with fifth-placed Rosberg. As far as the Constructors' Championship was concerned, McLaren closed the gap to championship leader Ferrari to ten points, while Red Bull advanced from fifth to third, a total of 15 points behind Ferrari.

== Report ==
=== Qualifying ===
Mark Webber took pole position for Red Bull Racing, on a wet and wild day of Qualifying for the Malaysian Grand Prix. The brave switch Webber made to intermediate tyres, after a delay during Q3, as a heavy storm lashed the circuit, proved pivotal – as the track started to dry in the last moments of qualifying.

The weather provided numerous high-profile casualties during the early period of the session, as both McLaren and Ferrari drivers inexplicably opted to remain in their garages while the rest of the field set banker laps, before the rain arrived. By the time they made their way onto the track, the rain had set in, and it proved impossible to complete a lap good enough to make it into Q2.

Jenson Button had set a lap time that was good enough to advance from Q1, but he ended up beached in the gravel, meaning that he would not take his place in Q2.

Mercedes GP team principal, Ross Brawn, believes that Saturday's wet qualifying session proved that teams rely too much on sophisticated weather radars, and do not use enough common sense when it comes to assessing the conditions.

"We learned a lesson there, because we almost got caught out," he said.

"It [the radar] was so definitive that there wouldn't be any rain for the rest of the session."

=== Qualifying classification ===
Pos	No	Driver	Constructor	Part 1	Part 2	Part 3	Grid
1	6	(Australia) Mark Webber	Red Bull-Renault	1:51.886	1:48.210	1:49.327	1
2	4	(Germany) Nico Rosberg	Mercedes	1:52.560	1:47.417	1:50.673	2
3	5	(Germany) Sebastian Vettel	Red Bull-Renault	1:47.632	1:46.828	1:50.789	3
4	14	(Germany) Adrian Sutil	Force India-Mercedes	1:49.479	1:47.085	1:50.914	4
5	10	(Germany) Nico Hülkenberg	Williams-Cosworth	1:49.664	1:47.346	1:51.001	5
6	11	(Poland) Robert Kubica	Renault	1:46.283	1:46.951	1:51.051	6
7	9	(Brazil) Rubens Barrichello	Williams-Cosworth	1:50.301	1:48.371	1:51.511	7
8	3	(Germany) Michael Schumacher	Mercedes	1:52.239	1:48.400	1:51.717	8
9	23	(Japan) Kamui Kobayashi	BMW Sauber-Ferrari	1:48.467	1:47.792	1:51.767	9
10	15	(Italy) Vitantonio Liuzzi	Force India-Mercedes	1:49.922	1:48.238	1:52.254	10
11	12	(Russia) Vitaly Petrov	Renault	1:47.952	1:48.760		11
12	22	(Spain) Pedro de la Rosa	BMW Sauber-Ferrari	1:47.153	1:48.771		12
13	16	(Switzerland) Sébastien Buemi	Toro Rosso-Ferrari	1:48.945	1:49.207		13
14	17	(Spain) Jaime Alguersuari	Toro Rosso-Ferrari	1:48.655	1:49.464		14
15	19	(Finland) Heikki Kovalainen	Lotus-Cosworth	1:52.875	1:52.270		15
16	24	(Germany) Timo Glock	Virgin-Cosworth	1:52.398	1:52.520		16
17	1	(United Kingdom) Jenson Button	McLaren-Mercedes	1:52.211	No Time		17
18	18	(Italy) Jarno Trulli	Lotus-Cosworth	1:52.884			18
19	8	(Spain) Fernando Alonso	Ferrari	1:53.044			19
20	2	(United Kingdom) Lewis Hamilton	McLaren-Mercedes	1:53.050			20
21	7	(Brazil) Felipe Massa	Ferrari	1:53.283			21
22	20	(India) Karun Chandhok	HRT-Cosworth	1:56.299			22
23	21	(Brazil) Bruno Senna	HRT-Cosworth	1:57.269			23
24	25	(Brazil) Lucas di Grassi	Virgin-Cosworth	1:59.977			24

=== Race ===
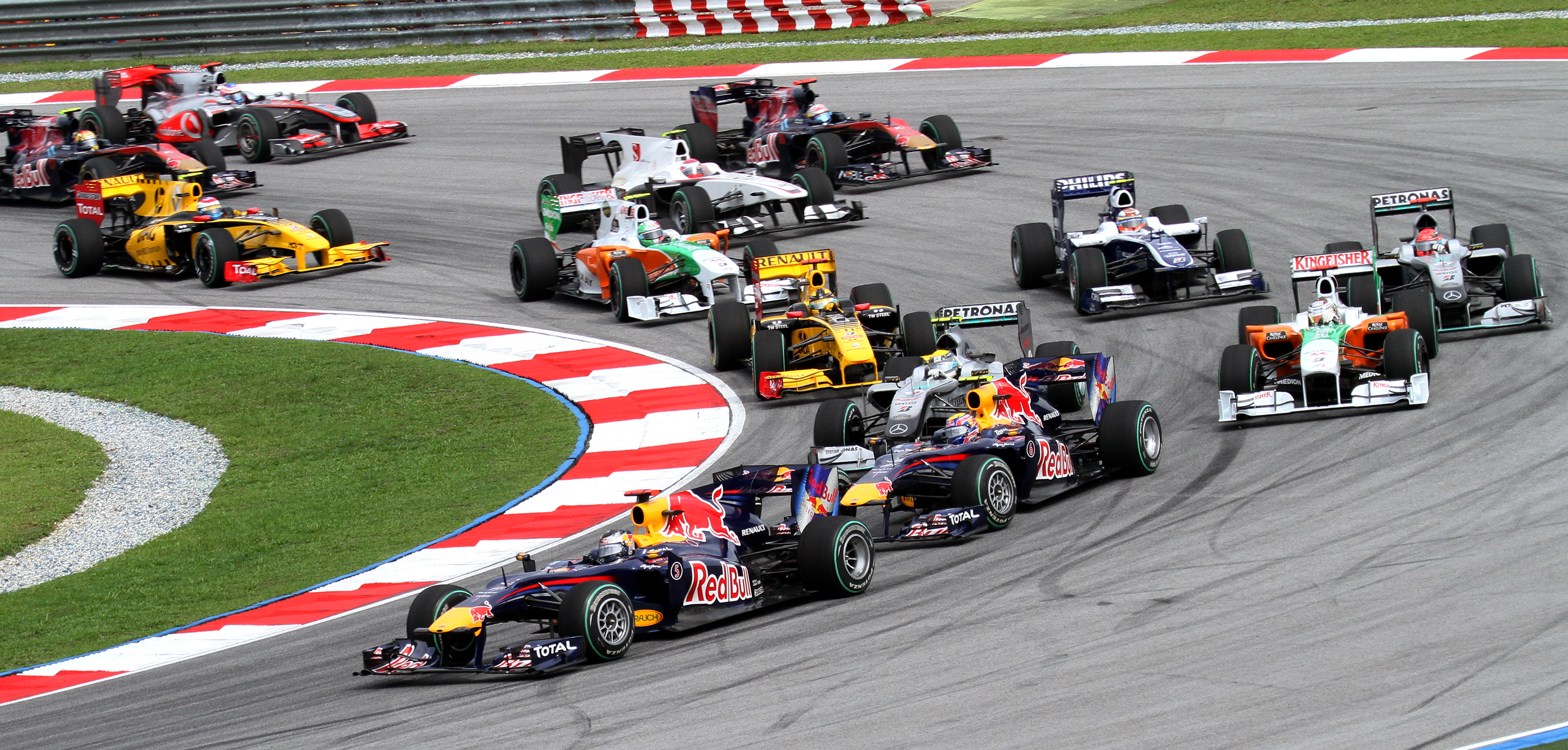
Sebastian Vettel takes the lead at the first corner of the race.

Prior to the race, Pedro de la Rosa's engine failed as the cars were making their way from the pit lane to their grid positions, and so he did not even take the formation lap.

At the start, Sebastian Vettel starting from third, got past Nico Rosberg immediately on the straight, and at the first corner came up the inside of polesitter and teammate Mark Webber to take the lead. Webber challenged in the next corner but Vettel held firm. Robert Kubica and Michael Schumacher also gained two places, and were fourth and sixth respectively. Rubens Barrichello who started seventh stalled on the grid and was last at the end of the first lap. Both McLarens and both Ferraris charged up the field from their lowly grid positions after failing to properly read the conditions in qualifying. Lewis Hamilton had got up from 20th to 13th, Felipe Massa from 21st to 14th, Jenson Button from 17th to 15th, and Fernando Alonso from 19th to 16th. At the end of lap 1, the top 10 were: Vettel, Webber, Rosberg, Kubica, Adrian Sutil, Schumacher, Nico Hülkenberg, Vitantonio Liuzzi, Vitaly Petrov and Kamui Kobayashi. Timo Glock retired on lap three after a collision with Jarno Trulli.

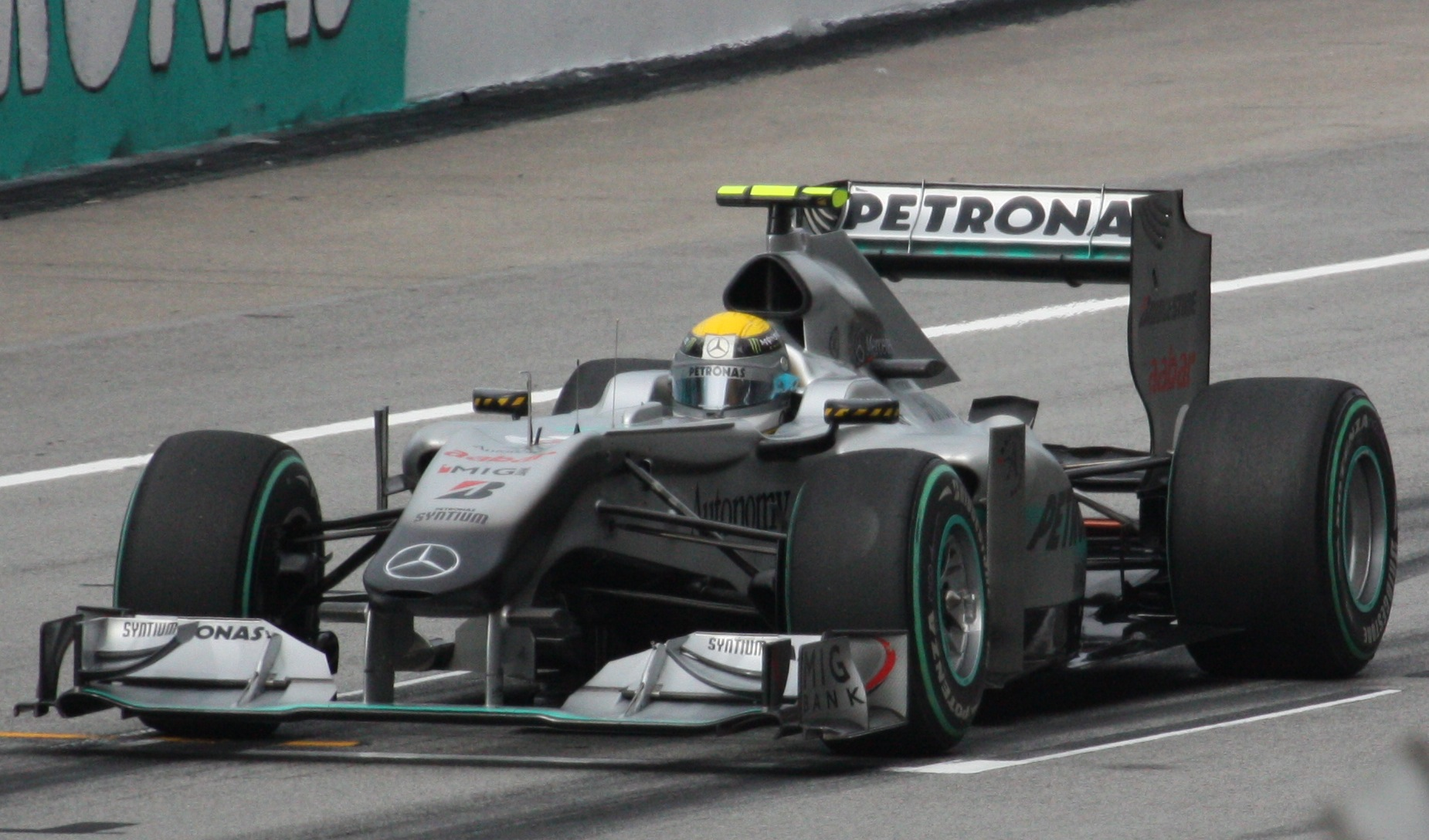
Nico Rosberg achieved the first podium for Mercedes; the first works Mercedes podium since the 1955 Italian Grand Prix.

Hamilton was on a charge, and soon was up to 10th within 4 laps, passing a car a lap. The Ferraris and Button could not get past Sébastien Buemi's Toro Rosso and were stuck with Massa 14th, Alonso 15th (having passed Button) and Button 16th. On the fifth lap, Hamilton passed Vitaly Petrov for ninth at the final turn, but Petrov came back at him at the back straight and regained the position. Two laps later, Hamilton once again passed Petrov at the final corner, however then weaved 4 times from side to side along the start finish straight in an effort to break the tow. He failed to do so as Petrov followed tightly behind and made an attempt to pass back at the first corner which did not succeed. Hamilton's manoeuvre of crossing from side to side 4 times courted controversy, dividing race pundits and drivers alike as to whether it was in breach of the regulations regarding the blocking of an overtake. The race stewards investigated the incident and issued Hamilton with a warning.

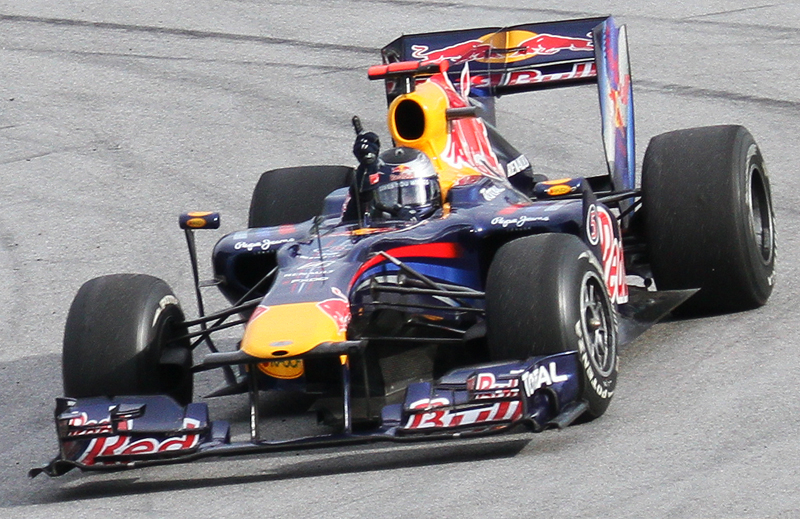
Vettel led 54 of the race's 56 laps as he won his sixth Grand Prix.

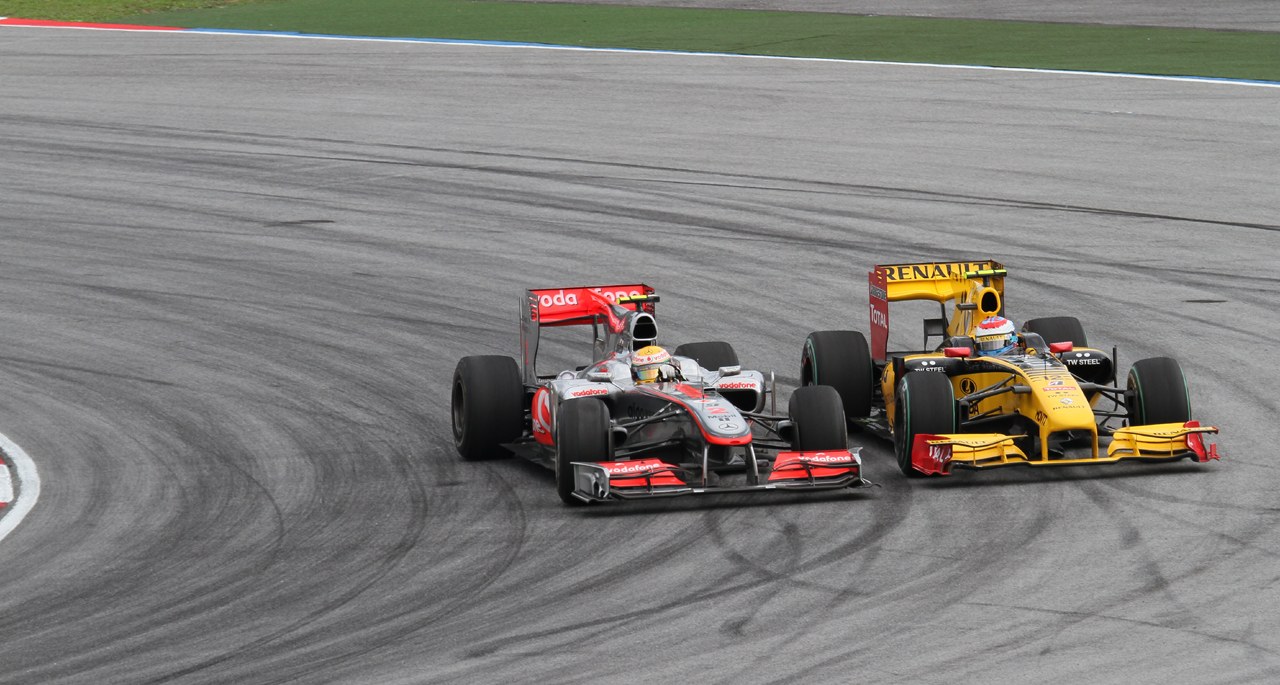
Lewis Hamilton was shown the black-and-white flag for unsportsmanlike behaviour during a battle with Vitaly Petrov.

Kobayashi, Schumacher and Liuzzi retired in quick succession on laps 8,9 and 12 with engine, loose wheel nut and throttle failures respectively. This left the top 10 as: Vettel, Webber, Rosberg, Kubica, Sutil, Hülkenberg, Hamilton, Jaime Alguersuari, Massa and Alonso. Button had passed Alonso on lap 9, but then immediately pitted to change to the harder tyres. He was the first man to pit. He resumed on a clear track, and immediately set the fastest lap of the race, with a 1:41.044. Hülkenberg soon pitted, releasing Hamilton, who immediately ran under 1:41, setting a 1:40.9 on lap 16. He had improved that to a 1:40.4 by lap 20, when Rosberg, Kubica, and Sutil all pitted. The Red Bulls stayed out until laps 24 and 25, with Vettel coming in first. He rejoined side by side with Hamilton, but got ahead taking the inside line on Turn 1. Webber's pit stop was not as smooth, with a problem on his wheelnut costing him 2 seconds, and he rejoined 4 seconds behind teammate Vettel, with Hamilton in between. Vettel immediately got into the 1:39s with a lap of 1:39.854. Webber responded by going two tenths quicker on the next lap. The top 10 at the end of lap 26 were: Vettel, Hamilton, Webber, Rosberg, Kubica, Massa, Alonso, Sutil, Button, and Hülkenberg.

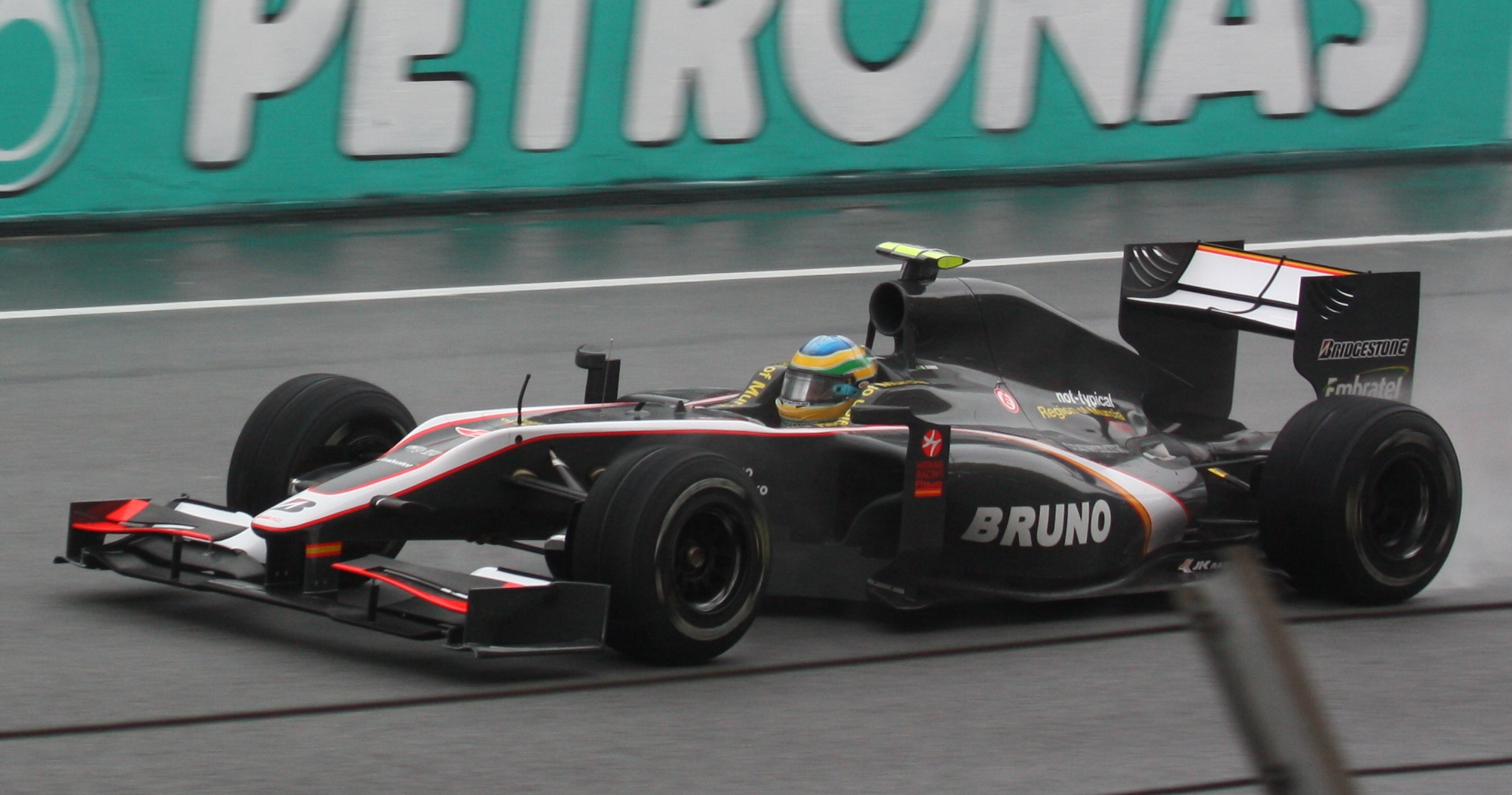
Bruno Senna finished his first F1 race in sixteenth position for Hispania Racing.

The three drivers who started on hard tyres—Hamilton, Massa, and Alonso—were the only top drivers who had not pitted. Massa pitted on lap 27 from sixth and rejoined ninth, just ahead of Hülkenberg. Massa, on the softs, and with clear track, immediately went over a second quicker than anyone else. On lap 28, he set a 1:38.002, a second and a half faster than the previous fastest lap. Hamilton followed suit, pitting on lap 31 from second. He rejoined seventh, just ahead of teammate Button. He immediately closed in on Sutil like a rocket, setting a new fastest lap of 1:37.745. By lap 34, he was right behind Sutil. Massa similarly was closing in on Button. Alonso was the last of the frontrunners to pit, on lap 37. He rejoined in ninth, behind Massa. He did what Massa and Hamilton did before, on the new softs, setting a string of fastest laps, the last being a 1:37.231 on lap 41, half a second quicker than anyone else, allowing him to close a gap of over 10 seconds to Massa and Button in five laps.

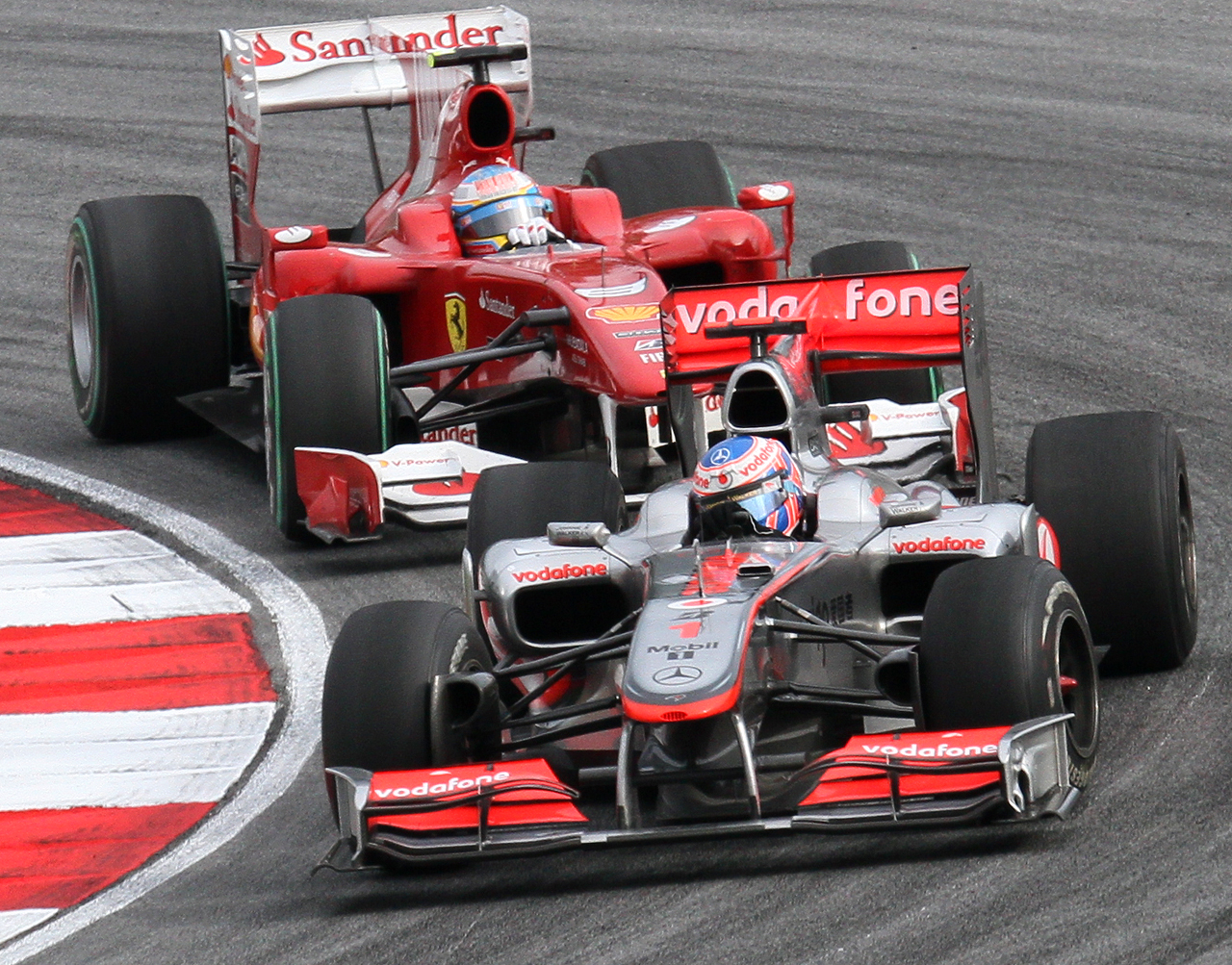
Jenson Button and Fernando Alonso battled on track before the engine in Alonso's Ferrari F10 failed.

Massa passed Button on lap 46 at the first corner, taking seventh place. He set about closing in on Hamilton, who was unable to pass Sutil. His lap times decreased by a second, but his tyres were 20 laps old, and he did not go as quickly as he had before. Alonso had been battling a gearbox problem for the entire race, and this affected his ability to pass Button. He made an attempt on lap 48, and then on the penultimate lap of the race, tried at Turn 1 and went wide. Alonso's engine then blew up, and he was out of the race from ninth. Also, on lap 53, Webber set a new fastest lap, 1:37.054.

Vettel took the chequered flag ahead of Webber, leading a Red Bull one-two, with Rosberg completing the podium in third. Kubica was fourth, Sutil held off Hamilton for fifth, and Massa and Button got seventh and eighth after gritty drives from the back. Alguersuari and Hülkenberg rounded out the point-scoring finishes, both scoring their first points in Formula One. Alguersuari's points made him the second youngest points scorer in Formula One history. Further back, Virgin got their first ever finish with Lucas di Grassi 14th and HRT got both their cars to the finish line for the first time, with Karun Chandhok 15th and Bruno Senna 16th. Jarno Trulli was last of the 17 classified finishers, having suffered hydraulic problems, although his teammate Heikki Kovalainen was still running at the end. He had pitted during the race with hydraulic issues and resumed nine laps adrift of the leader. He circulated six laps behind his nearest rival and did not complete enough laps to be classified as a finisher, ultimately taking the chequered flag ten laps down. Massa's 7th-place finish promoted him to the lead of the Drivers' Championship.

=== Race classification ===
Pos	No	Driver	Constructor	Laps	Time/Retired	Grid	Points
1	5	(Germany) Sebastian Vettel	Red Bull-Renault	56	1:33:48.412	3	25
2	6	(Australia) Mark Webber	Red Bull-Renault	56	+4.849	1	18
3	4	(Germany) Nico Rosberg	Mercedes	56	+13.504	2	15
4	11	(Poland) Robert Kubica	Renault	56	+18.589	6	12
5	14	(Germany) Adrian Sutil	Force India-Mercedes	56	+21.059	4	10
6	2	(United Kingdom) Lewis Hamilton	McLaren-Mercedes	56	+23.471	20	8
7	7	(Brazil) Felipe Massa	Ferrari	56	+27.068	21	6
8	1	(United Kingdom) Jenson Button	McLaren-Mercedes	56	+37.918	17	4
9	17	(Spain) Jaime Alguersuari	Toro Rosso-Ferrari	56	+1:10.602	14	2
10	10	(Germany) Nico Hülkenberg	Williams-Cosworth	56	+1:13.399	5	1
11	16	(Switzerland) Sébastien Buemi	Toro Rosso-Ferrari	56	+1:18.938	13	
12	9	(Brazil) Rubens Barrichello	Williams-Cosworth	55	+1 Lap	7	
13	8	(Spain) Fernando Alonso	Ferrari	54	Engine^{1}	19	
14	25	(Brazil) Lucas di Grassi	Virgin-Cosworth	53	+3 Laps	24	
15	20	(India) Karun Chandhok	HRT-Cosworth	53	+3 Laps	22	
16	21	(Brazil) Bruno Senna	HRT-Cosworth	52	+4 Laps	23	
17	18	(Italy) Jarno Trulli	Lotus-Cosworth	51	+5 Laps	18	
NC	19	(Finland) Heikki Kovalainen	Lotus-Cosworth	46	+10 laps	15	
Ret	12	(Russia) Vitaly Petrov	Renault	32	Gearbox	11	
Ret	15	(Italy) Vitantonio Liuzzi	Force India-Mercedes	12	Throttle	10	
Ret	3	(Germany) Michael Schumacher	Mercedes	9	Wheel nut	8	
Ret	23	(Japan) Kamui Kobayashi	BMW Sauber-Ferrari	8	Engine	9	
Ret	24	(Germany) Timo Glock	Virgin-Cosworth	2	Collision	16	
DNS	22	(Spain) Pedro de la Rosa	BMW Sauber-Ferrari	0	Engine	12	

Notes:

1. – Fernando Alonso retired, but was classified as he had completed over 90% of the winner's race distance.
2. — Heikki Kovalainen was not classified as he had completed less than 90% of the winners race distance.

== Championship standings after the race ==
Drivers' Championship standings

	Pos.	Driver	Points
1	1	(Brazil) Felipe Massa	39
1	2	(Spain) Fernando Alonso	37
4	3	(Germany) Sebastian Vettel	37
1	4	(United Kingdom) Jenson Button	35
	5	(Germany) Nico Rosberg	35

Constructors' Championship standings

	Pos.	Constructor	Points
	1	(Italy) Ferrari	76
	2	(United Kingdom) McLaren-Mercedes	66
2	3	(Austria) Red Bull-Renault	61
1	4	(Germany) Mercedes	44
1	5	(France) Renault	30

- Note: Only the top five positions are included for both sets of standings.

Previous race: 2010 Australian Grand Prix	FIA Formula One World Championship; 2010 season	Next race: 2010 Chinese Grand Prix
Previous race: 2009 Malaysian Grand Prix	Malaysian Grand Prix	Next race: 2011 Malaysian Grand Prix
