= Litespeed F3 =

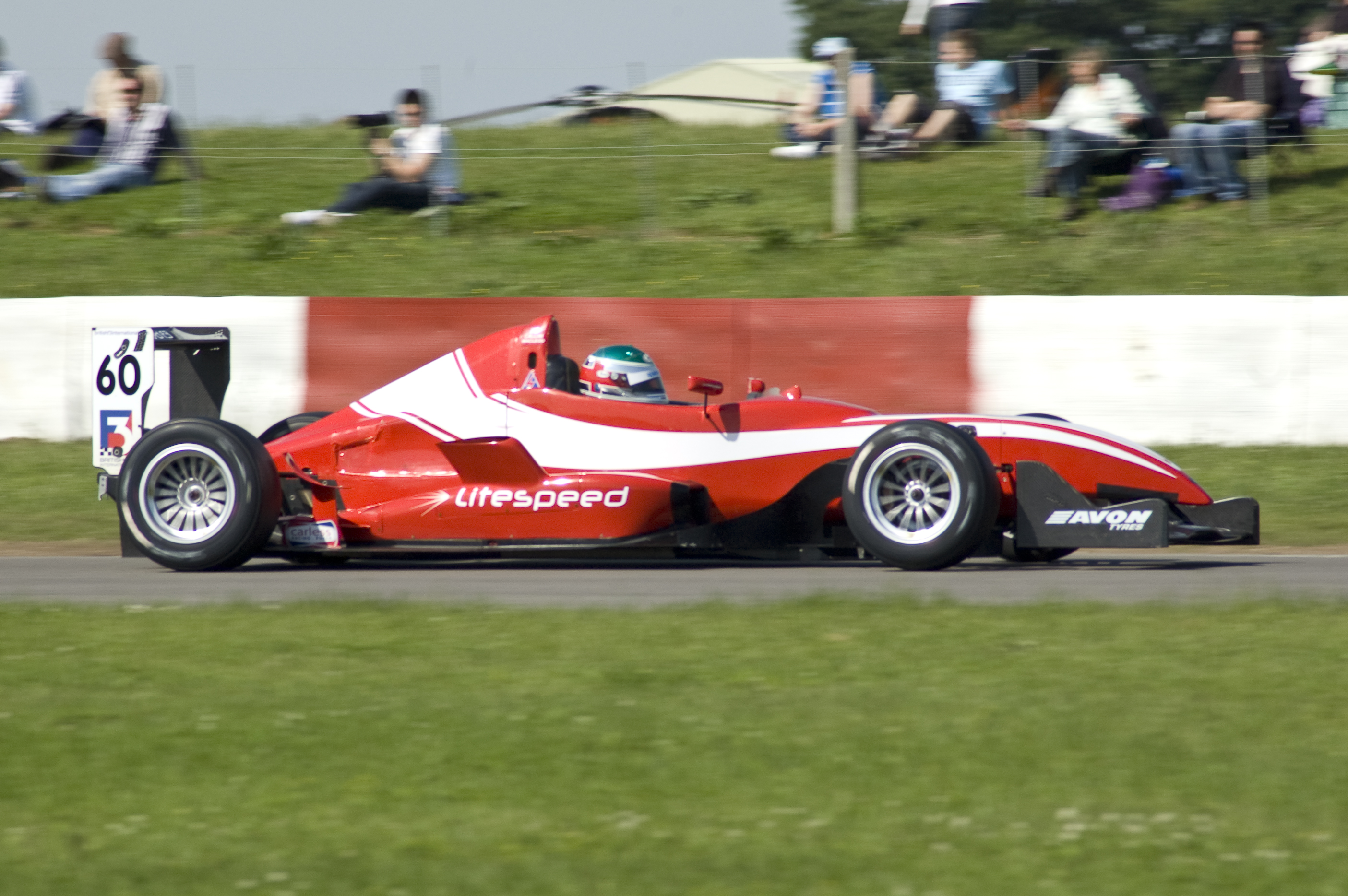
Callum MacLeod driving the Litespeed Formula Three car at Snetterton in 2008.

Litespeed F3 was a Norfolk, UK based F3 team, competing from 2008 to 2012, and founded by Steve Kenchington and Navdip "Nino" Singh Judge.

== Formula Three ==
In 2005, Litespeed were developing an F3 car originally manufactured in 2005 by the ATR Group in Italy as the SLC R1.

In 2006, the SLC R1 underwent a full aero upgrade, which produced good results particularly on high-speed tracks such as the Nürburgring in Germany, where it attained pole position. By having autonomy on suspension geometry and layout, the Litespeed R1 also had a slow-speed cornering advantage due to its setup capabilities.

In 2007, the car did not race and its design/copyright was acquired by Litespeed F3 owners Nino Singh Judge and Steve Kenchington. The car was converted from an Opel to Honda engine over the winter and early part of 2008.

The new car made its race debut at Snetterton in Norfolk in June 2008, and despite no testing was competitive driven by Callum MacLeod, while suffering from various teething problems. On only its second outing at Brands Hatch in Kent, the car finished 2nd driven by Jonathan Legris.

== F1 entry ==
Litespeed announced its intention to enter Formula One under the 2010 season's budget cap regulations. The team employed MGI Ltd., a company owned by former F1 designer Mike Gascoyne, in order to achieve this goal. When the budget cap was abolished the Malaysian backed team Lotus Racing negotiated with Litespeed to obtain their entry and compete under their own name while confirming the continued involvement of Mike Gascoyne.
