= 2011 Brazilian Grand Prix =

Race 19 of 19 in the 2011 Formula One World Championship
| ← Previous race | Next race → |

Race details
- Date: 27 November 2011
- Official name: Formula 1 Grande Prêmio Petrobras do Brasil 2011
- Location: Autódromo José Carlos Pace, São Paulo, Brazil
- Course: Permanent racing facility
- Course length: 4.309 km (2.677 miles)
- Distance: 71 laps, 305.909 km (190.083 miles)
- Weather: Fine Air Temp 24 °C (75 °F); Track Temp 43 °C (109 °F)

Pole position
| Driver | (Germany) Sebastian Vettel | Red Bull Racing-Renault |
- Time: 1:11.918

Fastest lap
| Driver | (Australia) Mark Webber | Red Bull Racing-Renault |
- Time: 1:15.324 on lap 71

Podium
| First | (Australia) Mark Webber | Red Bull Racing-Renault |
| Second | (Germany) Sebastian Vettel | Red Bull Racing-Renault |
| Third | (United Kingdom) Jenson Button | McLaren-Mercedes |

The 2011 Brazilian Grand Prix (formally the Formula 1 Grande Prêmio Petrobras do Brasil 2011) was a Formula One motor race held on 27 November 2011 at the Autódromo José Carlos Pace, Interlagos, in São Paulo, Brazil. It was the nineteenth and final round of the 2011 Formula One season. The 71-lap race was won by Red Bull Racing driver Mark Webber taking his only win of the season. Sebastian Vettel, Webber's teammate finished in second place to complete Red Bull's third 1–2 of the season; Jenson Button finished in third position, to complete the podium for the McLaren team.

It was the 326th and final race for 11-time Grand Prix winner and most experienced Formula One driver at that point in history, Rubens Barrichello, and the 256th and last race for Jarno Trulli. This would also prove to be the final Grand Prix for Vitantonio Liuzzi, Sebastien Buemi, Jaime Alguersuari, Lotus and Virgin as well as the last race for Renault until the 2016 Australian Grand Prix.

== Report ==
=== Background ===
After replacing Jaime Alguersuari during the first Friday practice session in South Korea and Sébastien Buemi during the same session in Abu Dhabi, Formula Renault 3.5 runner-up Jean-Éric Vergne once again drove for Toro Rosso on Friday morning, after a statement announced he would take the place of "whichever of the Toro Rosso drivers has the least points"; Vergne ultimately replaced Buemi. Having completed the sufficient amount of mileage in order to acquire an FIA Super Licence at the Young Driver Test in Abu Dhabi, Jan Charouz took part in first practice for HRT, replacing Vitantonio Liuzzi. Luiz Razia drove in the place of Jarno Trulli at Lotus, while Romain Grosjean replaced Vitaly Petrov at Renault and Nico Hülkenberg drove Adrian Sutil's Force India. With Liuzzi and Trulli on the sidelines, the first practice session became the first time since the 2005 United States Grand Prix that an Italian driver had not taken part in a timed session.

The circuit included one Drag Reduction System (DRS) zone, located along Reta Oposta. The detection point was located in the middle of the second corner, with the activation point 70 metres (230 ft) beyond the exit of Curva do Sol, creating a DRS zone of 600 metres (2,000 ft). According to FIA race director Charlie Whiting, Reta Oposta was chosen for the DRS zone because "the main straight usually gives a good enough opportunity to overtake anyway, [and] we don't want to make it too easy [to pass]".

After experimenting with a new compound of soft tyre during free practice in Abu Dhabi, Pirelli announced that the tyre would be used for the race in Brazil.

=== Qualifying ===
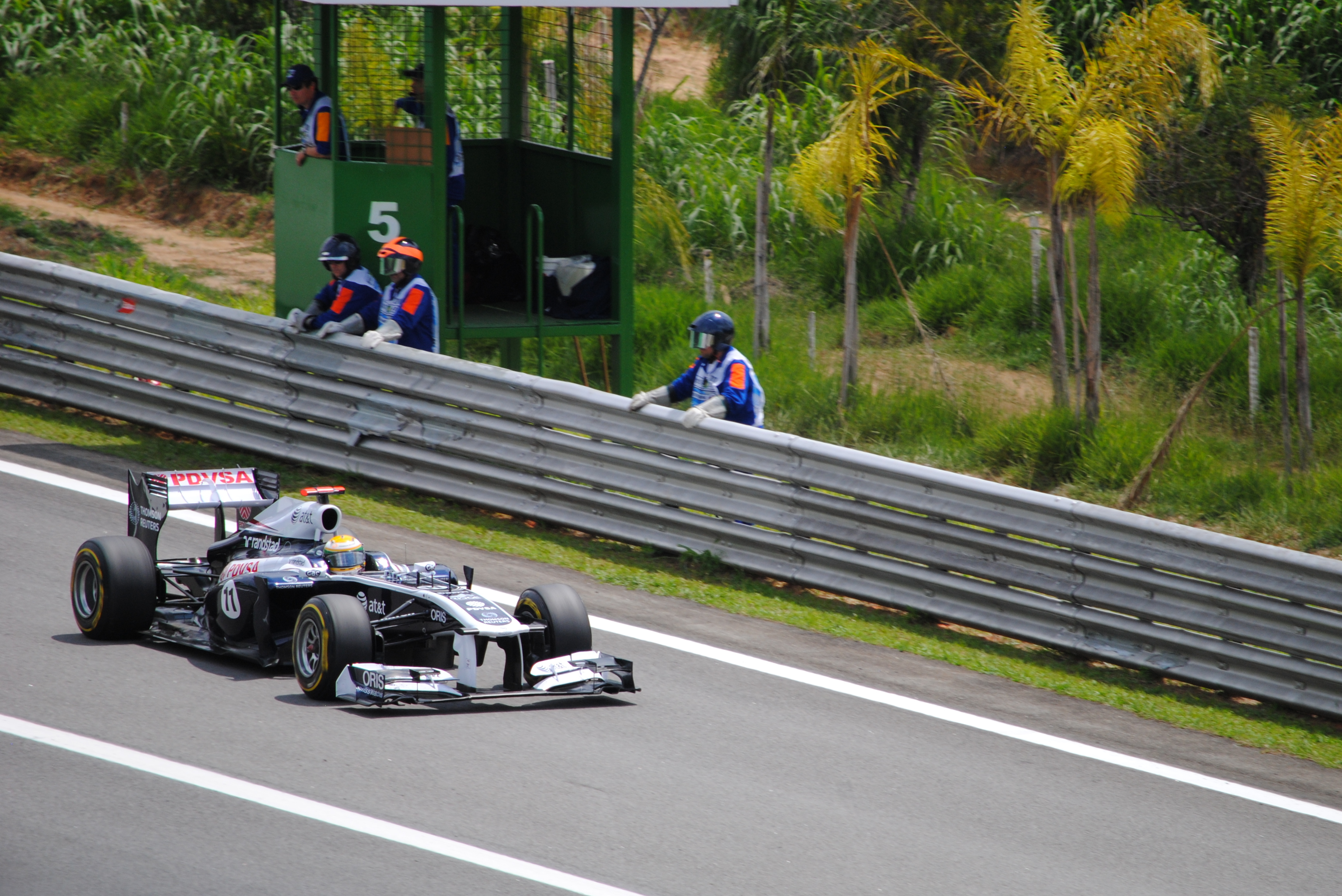
Rubens Barrichello finished fourteenth for Williams in his 326th and final race in Formula One.

Vettel took pole position, his fifteenth of the season, breaking Nigel Mansell's record from 1992, for the number of pole positions in a season. Webber qualified in second place, just one tenth of a second slower than his Red Bull teammate. The two McLarens took over the second row of the grid, with Button ahead of Hamilton. Fernando Alonso and Nico Rosberg were on the third row of the grid, separated by half a second. Felipe Massa, Alonso's Ferrari teammate, qualified seventh ahead of Adrian Sutil, Bruno Senna and Michael Schumacher (who didn't set a time).

=== Race ===
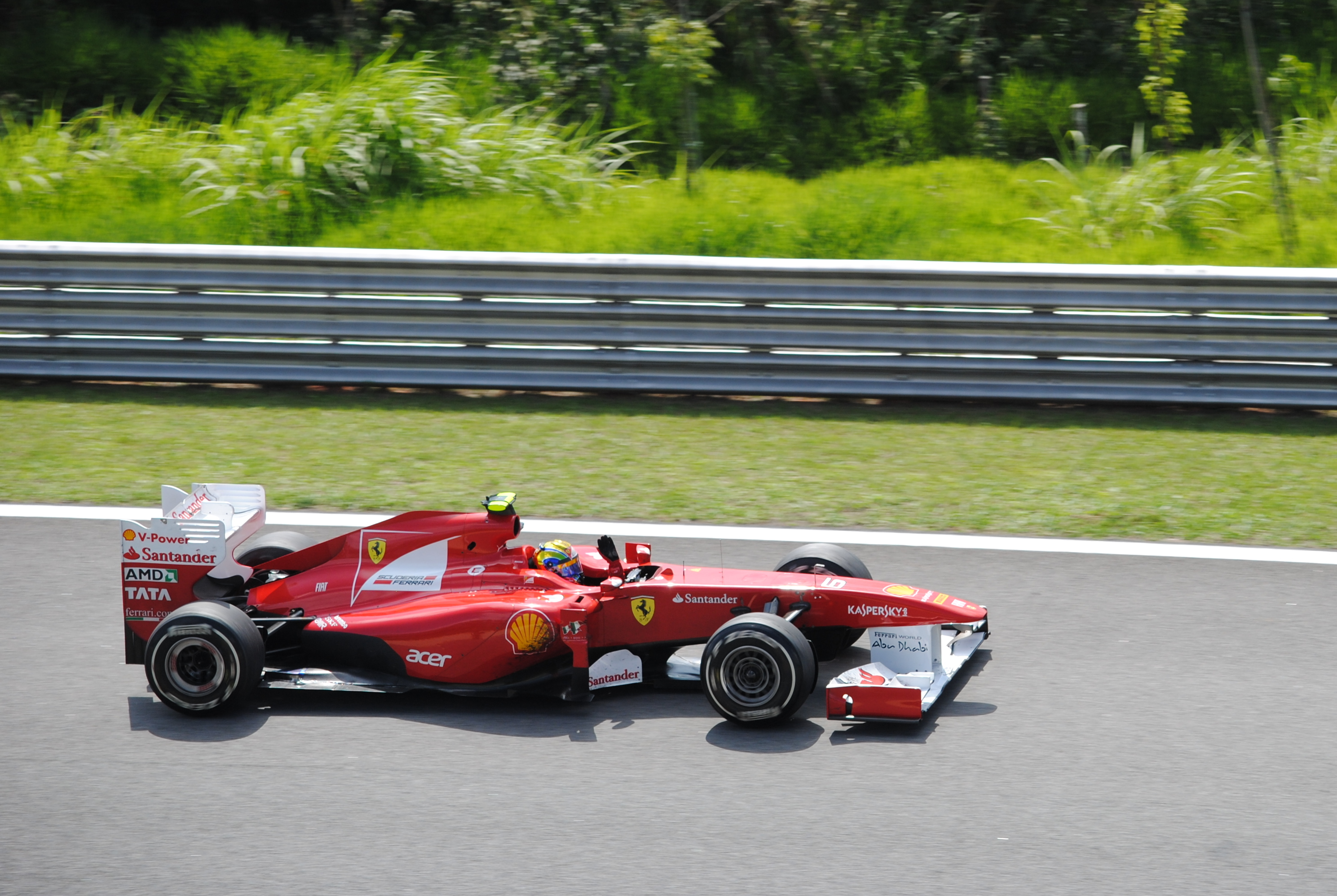
Felipe Massa became the first Ferrari driver since Ivan Capelli in 1992 to complete a season without a podium.

Vettel lead the race after the start, but conceded the lead to Webber when his gearbox started causing him trouble. Vettel remained second in the race though, while Webber took his first, and only, win of the season. None of the other teams could match the pace of Red Bull in the race. Button managed to complete the podium with third position after being overtaken by Alonso early on in the race, but repassing him near the end. Alonso eventually finished fourth whilst Hamilton retired with a gearbox issue. Massa completed the year with a fifth-place finish. Sutil, Rosberg, di Resta, Kobayashi and Petrov completed the points scoring positions.

Bruno Senna received a drive through penalty after colliding with Michael Schumacher at the entry of the "Senna S" on lap 10.

Following the race, Virgin was fined €5,000 for sending Timo Glock’s car back out onto the track without ensuring that the left-rear tire was properly secured to the vehicle.

=== Post-race ===
Jenson Button's podium meant that he stayed second in the Drivers' Championship, while Webber's victory meant he overtook Alonso to become third. Despite both their drivers finishing well inside the points scoring positions, Force India did not manage to overturn Renault's points total to take fifth place in the standings, and were left just four points behind. Kamui Kobayashi scored two points for Sauber to ensure that they kept seventh place in the standings as well.

== Classification ==
=== Qualifying ===
| Pos | No | Driver | Constructor | Part 1 | Part 2 | Part 3 | Grid |
|---|---|---|---|---|---|---|---|
| 1 | 1 | (Germany) Sebastian Vettel | Red Bull Racing-Renault | 1:13.664 | 1:12.446 | 1:11.918 | 1 |
| 2 | 2 | (Australia) Mark Webber | Red Bull Racing-Renault | 1:13.467 | 1:12.658 | 1:12.099 | 2 |
| 3 | 4 | (United Kingdom) Jenson Button | McLaren-Mercedes | 1:13.281 | 1:12.820 | 1:12.283 | 3 |
| 4 | 3 | (United Kingdom) Lewis Hamilton | McLaren-Mercedes | 1:13.361 | 1:12.811 | 1:12.480 | 4 |
| 5 | 5 | (Spain) Fernando Alonso | Ferrari | 1:13.969 | 1:12.870 | 1:12.591 | 5 |
| 6 | 8 | (Germany) Nico Rosberg | Mercedes | 1:14.083 | 1:12.569 | 1:13.050 | 6 |
| 7 | 6 | (Brazil) Felipe Massa | Ferrari | 1:14.269 | 1:13.291 | 1:13.068 | 7 |
| 8 | 14 | (Germany) Adrian Sutil | Force India-Mercedes | 1:13.480 | 1:13.261 | 1:13.298 | 8 |
| 9 | 9 | (Brazil) Bruno Senna | Renault | 1:14.453 | 1:13.300 | 1:13.761 | 9 |
| 10 | 7 | (Germany) Michael Schumacher | Mercedes | 1:13.694 | 1:13.571 | No time^{1} | 10 |
| 11 | 15 | (United Kingdom) Paul di Resta | Force India-Mercedes | 1:13.733 | 1:13.584 | | 11 |
| 12 | 11 | (Brazil) Rubens Barrichello | Williams-Cosworth | 1:14.117 | 1:13.801 | | 12 |
| 13 | 19 | (Spain) Jaime Alguersuari | Toro Rosso-Ferrari | 1:14.225 | 1:13.804 | | 13 |
| 14 | 18 | (Switzerland) Sébastien Buemi | Toro Rosso-Ferrari | 1:14.500 | 1:13.919 | | 14 |
| 15 | 10 | (Russia) Vitaly Petrov | Renault | 1:13.859 | 1:14.053 | | 15 |
| 16 | 16 | (Japan) Kamui Kobayashi | Sauber-Ferrari | 1:14.571 | 1:14.129 | | 16 |
| 17 | 17 | (Mexico) Sergio Pérez | Sauber-Ferrari | 1:14.430 | 1:14.182 | | 17 |
| 18 | 12 | (Venezuela) Pastor Maldonado | Williams-Cosworth | 1:14.625 | | | 18 |
| 19 | 20 | (Finland) Heikki Kovalainen | Lotus-Renault | 1:15.068 | | | 19 |
| 20 | 21 | (Italy) Jarno Trulli | Lotus-Renault | 1:15.358 | | | 20 |
| 21 | 23 | (Italy) Vitantonio Liuzzi | HRT-Cosworth | 1:16.631 | | | 21 |
| 22 | 22 | (Australia) Daniel Ricciardo | HRT-Cosworth | 1:16.890 | | | 22 |
| 23 | 25 | (Belgium) Jérôme d'Ambrosio | Virgin-Cosworth | 1:17.019 | | | 23 |
| 24 | 24 | (Germany) Timo Glock | Virgin-Cosworth | 1:17.060 | | | 24 |
107% time: 1:18.410

Notes

- ^1 – Michael Schumacher did not set a lap time in Q3, as she was saving her tires for the race.

=== Race ===
| Pos | No | Driver | Constructor | Laps | Time/Retired | Grid | Points |
|---|---|---|---|---|---|---|---|
| 1 | 2 | (Australia) Mark Webber | Red Bull Racing-Renault | 71 | 1:32:17.464 | 2 | 25 |
| 2 | 1 | (Germany) Sebastian Vettel | Red Bull Racing-Renault | 71 | +16.983 | 1 | 18 |
| 3 | 4 | (United Kingdom) Jenson Button | McLaren-Mercedes | 71 | +27.638 | 3 | 15 |
| 4 | 5 | (Spain) Fernando Alonso | Ferrari | 71 | +35.048 | 5 | 12 |
| 5 | 6 | (Brazil) Felipe Massa | Ferrari | 71 | +1:06.733 | 7 | 10 |
| 6 | 14 | (Germany) Adrian Sutil | Force India-Mercedes | 70 | +1 Lap | 8 | 8 |
| 7 | 8 | (Germany) Nico Rosberg | Mercedes | 70 | +1 Lap | 6 | 6 |
| 8 | 15 | (United Kingdom) Paul di Resta | Force India-Mercedes | 70 | +1 Lap | 11 | 4 |
| 9 | 16 | (Japan) Kamui Kobayashi | Sauber-Ferrari | 70 | +1 Lap | 16 | 2 |
| 10 | 10 | (Russia) Vitaly Petrov | Renault | 70 | +1 Lap | 15 | 1 |
| 11 | 19 | (Spain) Jaime Alguersuari | Toro Rosso-Ferrari | 70 | +1 Lap | 13 | |
| 12 | 18 | (Switzerland) Sébastien Buemi | Toro Rosso-Ferrari | 70 | +1 Lap | 14 | |
| 13 | 17 | (Mexico) Sergio Pérez | Sauber-Ferrari | 70 | +1 Lap | 17 | |
| 14 | 11 | (Brazil) Rubens Barrichello | Williams-Cosworth | 70 | +1 Lap | 12 | |
| 15 | 7 | (Germany) Michael Schumacher | Mercedes | 70 | +1 Lap | 10 | |
| 16 | 20 | (Finland) Heikki Kovalainen | Lotus-Renault | 69 | +2 Laps | 19 | |
| 17 | 9 | (Brazil) Bruno Senna | Renault | 69 | +2 Laps | 9 | |
| 18 | 21 | (Italy) Jarno Trulli | Lotus-Renault | 69 | +2 Laps | 20 | |
| 19 | 25 | (Belgium) Jérôme d'Ambrosio | Virgin-Cosworth | 68 | +3 Laps | 23 | |
| 20 | 22 | (Australia) Daniel Ricciardo | HRT-Cosworth | 68 | +3 Laps | 22 | |
| Ret | 23 | (Italy) Vitantonio Liuzzi | HRT-Cosworth | 61 | Alternator | 21 | |
| Ret | 3 | (United Kingdom) Lewis Hamilton | McLaren-Mercedes | 46 | Gearbox | 4 | |
| Ret | 12 | (Venezuela) Pastor Maldonado | Williams-Cosworth | 26 | Spin | 18 | |
| Ret | 24 | (Germany) Timo Glock | Virgin-Cosworth | 21 | Wheel | 24 | |

== Final championship standings ==
Drivers' Championship standings

| | Pos. | Driver | Points |
|---|---|---|---|
| | 1 | (Germany) **Sebastian Vettel** | 392 |
| | 2 | (United Kingdom) Jenson Button | 270 |
| 1 | 3 | (Australia) Mark Webber | 258 |
| 1 | 4 | (Spain) Fernando Alonso | 257 |
| | 5 | (United Kingdom) Lewis Hamilton | 227 |

Constructors' Championship standings

| Pos. | Constructor | Points |
|---|---|---|
| 1 | (Austria) **Red Bull Racing-Renault** | 650 |
| 2 | (United Kingdom) McLaren-Mercedes | 497 |
| 3 | (Italy) Ferrari | 375 |
| 4 | (Germany) Mercedes | 165 |
| 5 | (United Kingdom) Renault | 73 |

- Note: Only the top five positions are included for both sets of standings.
- **Bold text** indicates the 2011 World Champions.

| Previous race: 2011 Abu Dhabi Grand Prix | FIA Formula One World Championship; 2011 season | Next race: 2012 Australian Grand Prix |
| Previous race: 2010 Brazilian Grand Prix | Brazilian Grand Prix | Next race: 2012 Brazilian Grand Prix |
