= Force India VJM02 =

2009 Formula One race car

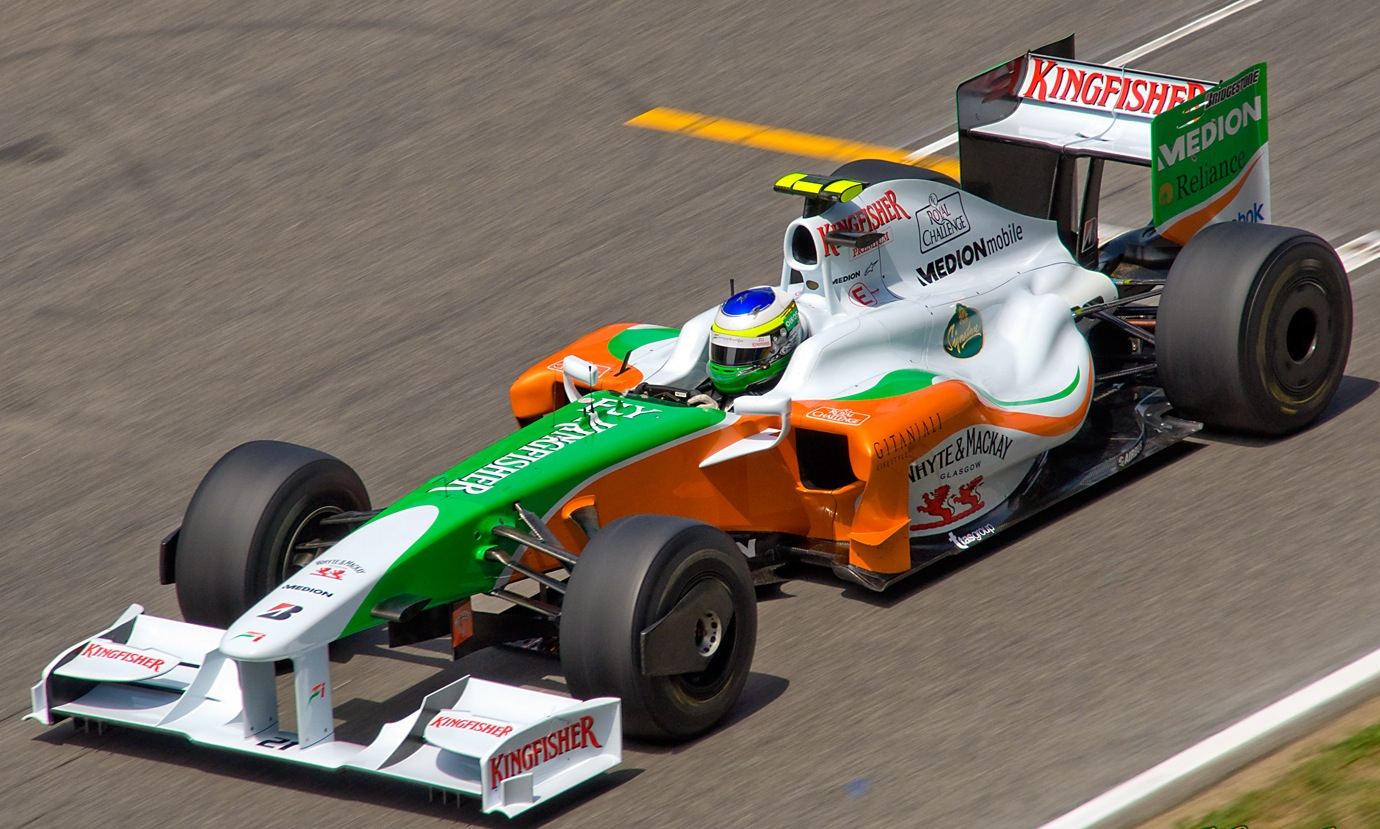
- Giancarlo Fisichella driving the VJM02 at the Spanish Grand Prix
- Category: Formula One
- Constructor: Force India
- Designers: James Key (Technical Director); Mark Smith (Design Director); Ian Hall (Chief Designer); Bruce Eddington (Head of Design, Composites); Daniel Carpenter (Head of Design, Mechanical Design); Simon Gardner (Head of R&D); Richard Frith (Head of Vehicle Science); Simon Phillips (Head of Aerodynamics); Simon Belcher (Chief Aerodynamicist)
- Predecessor: Force India VJM01
- Successor: Force India VJM03

Technical specifications
- Chassis: Carbon fibre composite monocoque with Zylon legality side anti-intrusion panels.
- Suspension (front): Aluminium MMC uprights with carbon fibre composite wishbones, trackrod and pushrod. Inboard chassis mounted torsion springs, dampers and anti-roll bar assembly.
- Suspension (rear): Aluminium MMC uprights with carbon fibre composite wishbones, trackrod and pushrod. Inboard gearbox mounted torsion springs, dampers and anti-roll bar assembly.
- Length: 4900mm
- Height: 950mm
- Axle track: 1480mm (front) 1420mm (rear)
- Wheelbase: 3200mm
- Engine: Mercedes-Benz FO 108W 2.4L V8, naturally aspirated, mid-mounted
- Transmission: McLaren, 7 forward gears + 1 reverse, semi-automatic
- Weight: 605kg (with driver, by regulations)
- Fuel: Mobil High Performance Unleaded (5.75% bio fuel)
- Lubricants: Mobil 1 – for higher performance, lower friction and better wear resistance
- Tyres: Bridgestone with Forged wheels to Force India specification

Competition history
- Notable entrants: Force India F1 Team
- Notable drivers: 20. (Germany) Adrian Sutil; 21. (Italy) Giancarlo Fisichella; 21. (Italy) Vitantonio Liuzzi
- Debut: 2009 Australian Grand Prix
- Last event: 2009 Abu Dhabi Grand Prix
Races	Wins	Podiums	Poles	F/Laps
17	0	1	1	1

The Force India VJM02 was Force India's Formula One car for the 2009 Formula One season. It was revealed in a low-key press event, after the car's first test at the Silverstone Circuit, on February 28, 2009, before a public test at the Circuito de Jerez in Spain the following day. The Northamptonshire-based team's car is decorated in the colours of the Indian flag, and was driven by the same drivers as in 2008 – Giancarlo Fisichella and Adrian Sutil.

The VJM02 was the first British-based foreign F1 car to utilize ExxonMobil fuel and lubricants as Mobil brand, in which Esso and Exxon was used on Red Bull RB13 8 years later along with Mobil from 2017, as they are currently ExxonMobil brands from 1999. The VJM02 was also the first Mercedes-powered non-McLaren Formula One car since the Sauber C13 in the 1994 season.

== Development ==
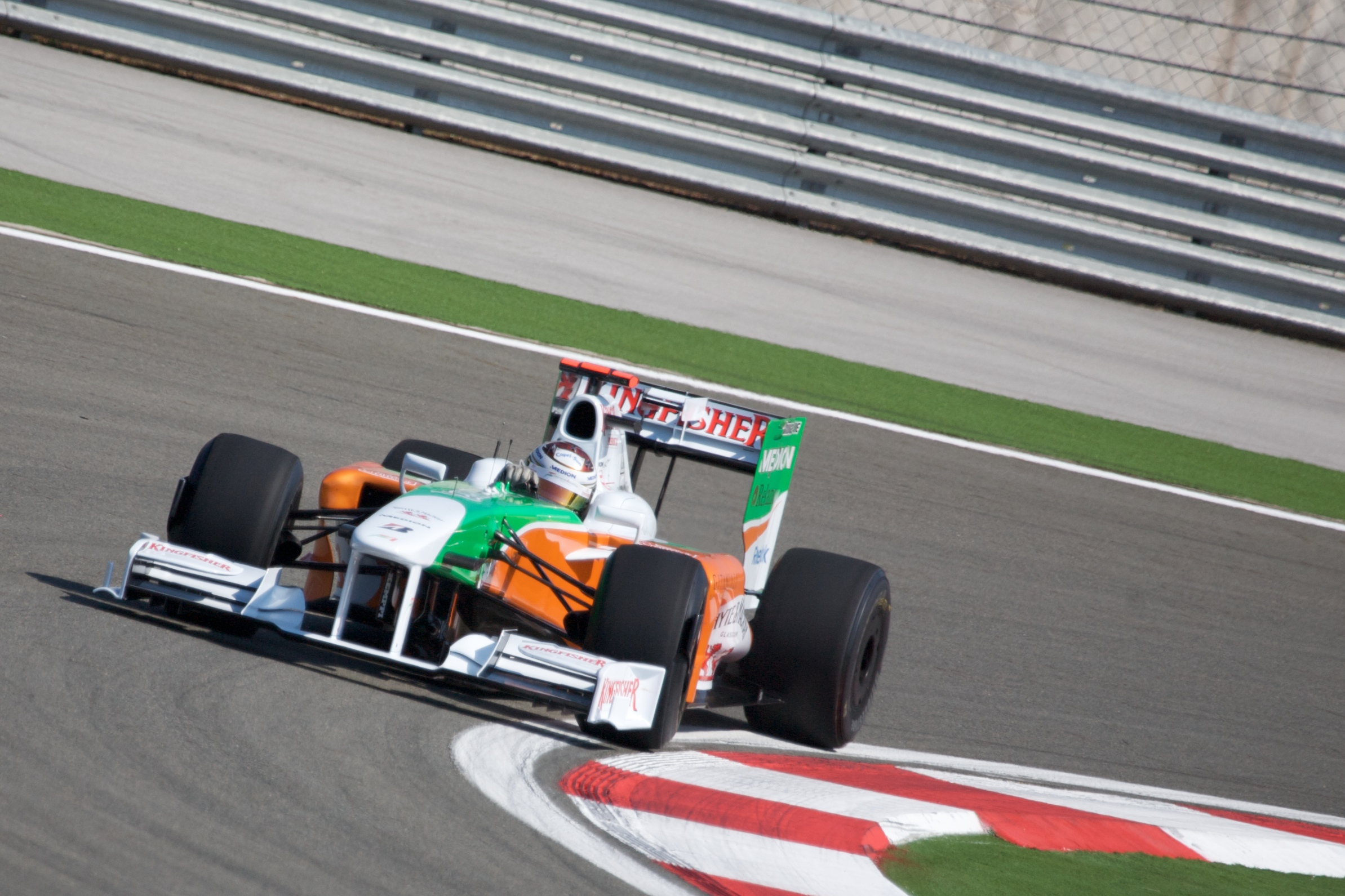
Sutil during the Turkish Grand Prix.

Two men instrumental in the early design of the VJM02, chief technical officer Mike Gascoyne and team principal Colin Kolles, were released from their contracts in late 2008, after a conflict with team owner Vijay Mallya. The team decided late in development to change from a Ferrari to a Mercedes engine, along with McLaren gearboxes and hydraulics. Adapting to these new components required a minor redesign of several parts of the car, including the suspension, side-pods and the rear aerodynamics. In making such a late switch, the team chose to forfeit testing time in favour of development time, but were confident that the change gave them a better car than would otherwise have been the case.

At the Bahrain Grand Prix, a revised floor and diffuser for the VJM02 were introduced, as well as an upgraded front wing and reprofiled sidepods. Driver Fisichella welcomed the upgrades, claiming the car's current lack of downforce will be addressed by the new modifications. The team brought further updates at the European Grand Prix, which worked very well, giving the team their first podium finish at the Belgian Grand Prix, a day after Fisichella scored an unexpected pole position.

== Technical specifications ==
New rules in place for the 2009 season require cars to have narrower and higher rear wings and wider and lower front wings, designed to reduce air disturbance to following cars and hence make overtaking easier. Slick tyres will be re-introduced into Formula One, after being absent since 1998. This will increase the VJM02's tyre grip by about 20%.

The VJM02 had the option to feature a Kinetic Energy Recovery System (KERS), which allows energy which would otherwise be wasted while braking to be re-used in set amounts per lap, via a boost button on the driver's steering wheel. The energy is stored in either a battery or a flywheel. This is the result of new rules for the 2009 season. The VJM02 was supposed to use the same system from the McLaren MP4-24, however Force India did not use it during the season.

== Season summary ==
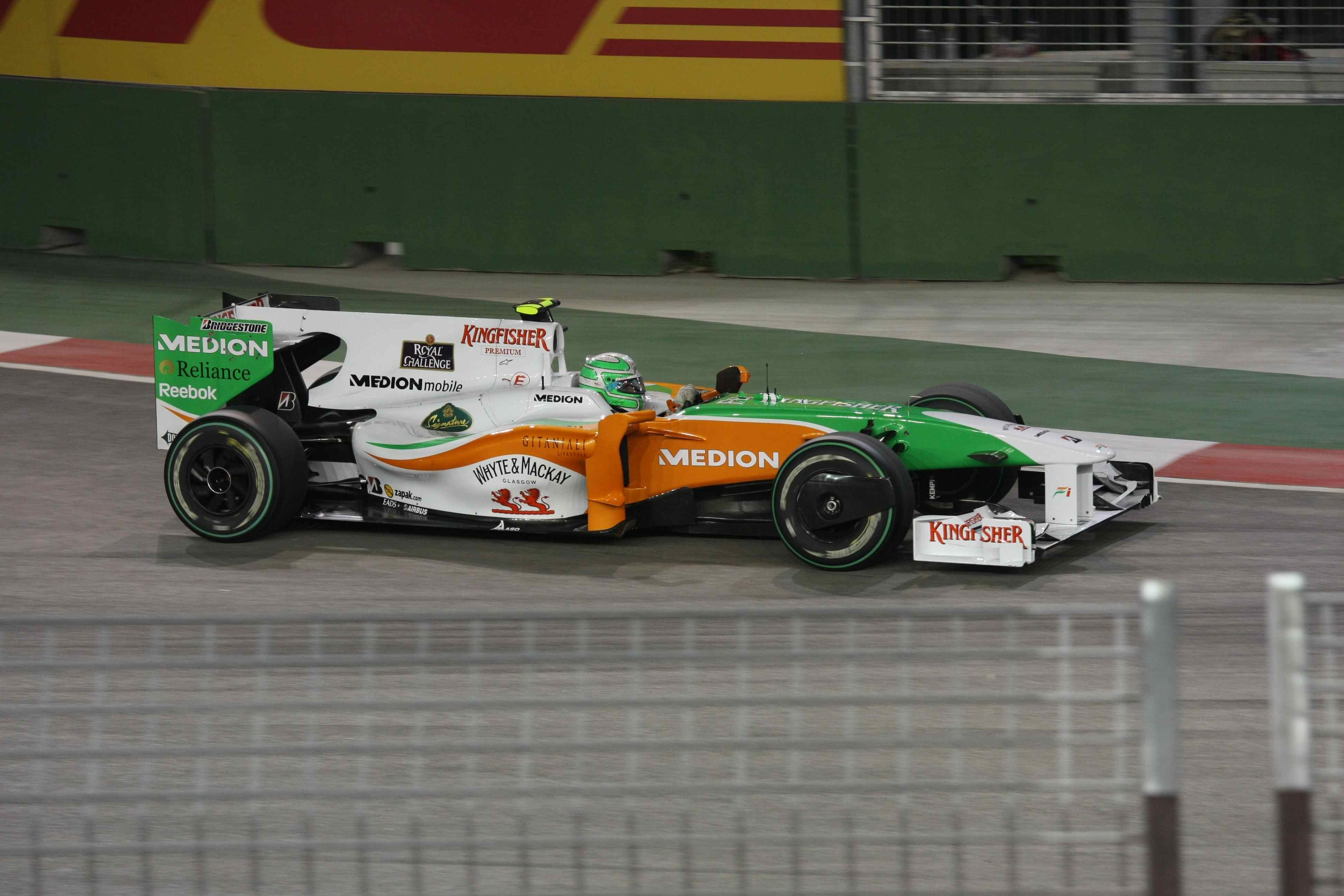
Liuzzi replaced the Ferrari-bound Fisichella mid-season (pictured during Singapore Grand Prix).

Overall, the VJM02’s performance was almost as poor as last season’s, only getting two points finishes, which ended up with them 9th on the constructors championship .

Despite this, those two points finishes were remarkable: in the Belgian Grand Prix, Fisichella got a surprise first pole position for the team and eventually finished second behind Kimi Räikkönen, which eventually gave him a fill-in spot in Ferrari in place of the injured Felipe Massa (Vitantonio Liuzzi being his replacement), while Sutil managed a fourth place and a fastest lap in the next race, the Italian Grand Prix.

== Sponsorship and livery ==
The car had a new livery, a white base paint with green and orange, denoting to the Indian flag and the Hindi heritage. Both Kingfisher and Medion were returned for the second year along with new sponsors; Royal Challenge, Whyte & Mackay, Airbus and Reebok.

== Complete Formula One results ==
(key) (results in bold indicate pole position; results in italics indicate fastest lap)

Year	Entrant	Engine	Tyres	Drivers	1	2	3	4	5	6	7	8	9	10	11	12	13	14	15	16	17	Points	WCC
2009	Force India Formula One Team	Mercedes FO108W V8	**B**		AUS	MAL	CHN	BHR	ESP	MON	TUR	GBR	GER	HUN	EUR	BEL	ITA	SIN	JPN	BRA	ABU	13	9th
2009	Force India Formula One Team	Mercedes FO108W V8	**B**	Sutil	9	17	17^{†}	16	Ret	14	17	17	15	Ret	10	11	4	Ret	13	Ret	17	13	9th
2009	Force India Formula One Team	Mercedes FO108W V8	**B**	Fisichella	11	18	14	15	14	9	Ret	10	11	14	12	**2**						13	9th
2009	Force India Formula One Team	Mercedes FO108W V8	**B**	Liuzzi													Ret	14	14	11	15	13	9th

^{†} Driver failed to finish, but was classified as they had completed >90% of the race distance.
