= Force India VJM03 =

2010 Formula One racing car

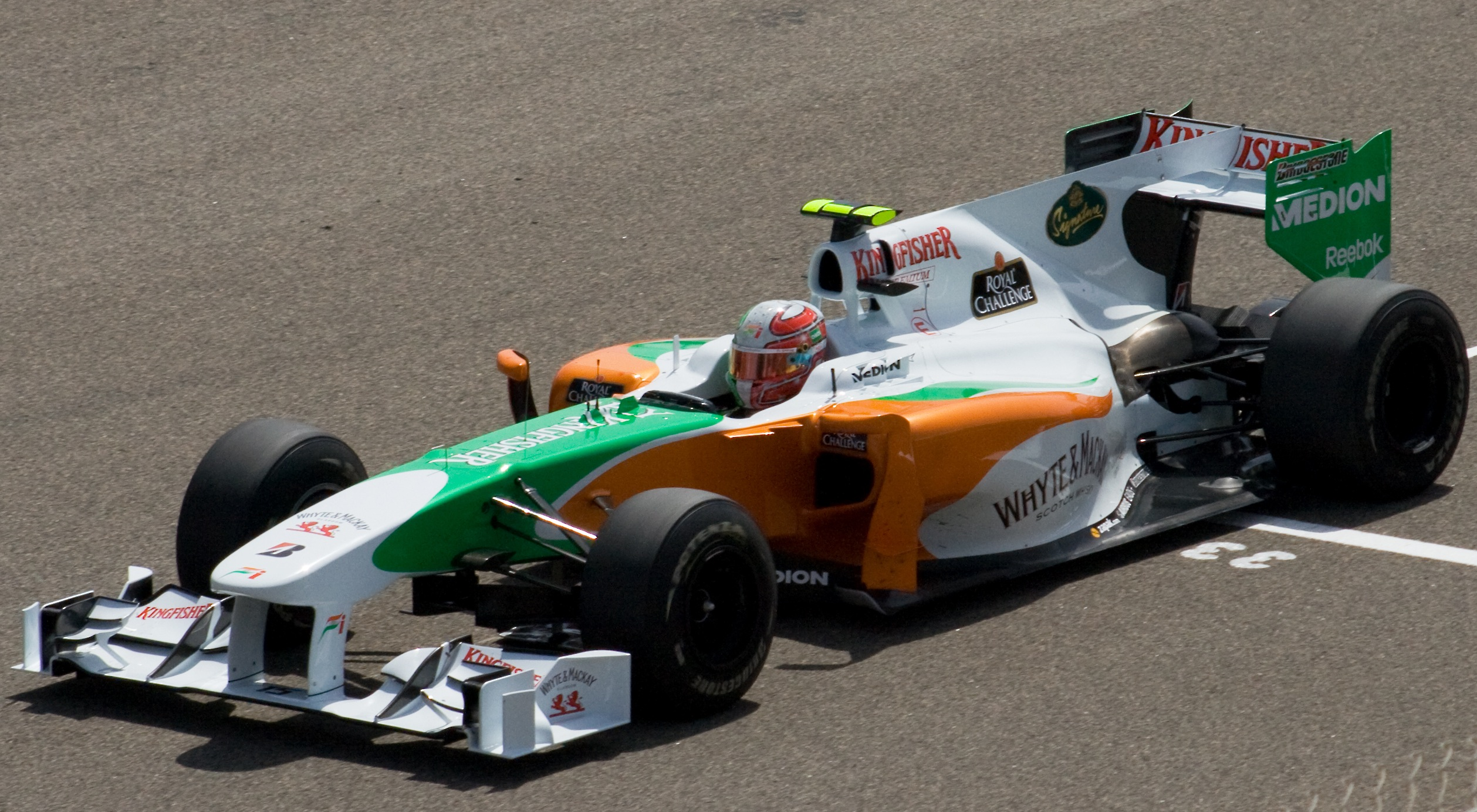
- Vitantonio Liuzzi driving the VJM03 at the Bahrain Grand Prix
- Category: Formula One
- Constructor: Force India
- Designers: Mark Smith(Design Director); James Key (Technical Director); Akio Haga (Chief Designer); Bruce Eddington (Head of Design, Composites); Daniel Carpenter (Head of Design, Mechanical Design); Simon Gardner (Head of R&D); Richard Frith (Head of Vehicle Science); Simon Phillips(Head of Aerodynamics); Simon Belcher (Chief Aerodynamicist)
- Predecessor: Force India VJM02
- Successor: Force India VJM04

Technical specifications
- Chassis: Carbon fibre composite monocoque with Zylon legality side anti-intrusion panels
- Suspension (front): Aluminium uprights with carbon fibre composite wishbones, trackrod and pushrod. Inboard chassis mounted torsion springs, dampers and anti-roll bar assembly
- Suspension (rear): as front
- Engine: Mercedes-Benz FO 108X 2,400 cc (146.5 cu in) 90° V8, limited to 18,000 RPM naturally aspirated mid-mounted
- Transmission: McLaren Seven-speed semi-automatic gearbox with reverse gear Electronic shift system
- Weight: 620 kg (1,367 lb) (including driver)
- Fuel: Mobil
- Tyres: Bridgestone Potenza; BBS Wheels (front and rear): 13"

Competition history
- Notable entrants: Force India F1 Team
- Notable drivers: 14. (Germany) Adrian Sutil; 15. (Italy) Vitantonio Liuzzi
- Debut: 2010 Bahrain Grand Prix
- Last event: 2010 Abu Dhabi Grand Prix
Races	Wins	Podiums	Poles	F/Laps
19	0	0	0	0

The Force India VJM03 was a Formula One motor racing car designed and built by the Force India team for the 2010 season. It was driven by Adrian Sutil and Vitantonio Liuzzi and was unveiled online, on 9 February 2010. The car made its track début the following day at the second group test at Circuito de Jerez.

== Overview ==
The VJM03 built on the progress made with the 2009 car and was a contender for points straight out of the box. But the team lost several top members of staff in the first half of the season. Among them was a man who had been with them since their first year as Jordan in 1991 – Ian Phillips. That setback for the team’s commercial side was joined by a double blow to the technical department. First technical director as James Key left for Sauber, then four months later his successor Mark Smith was also gone, heading for Lotus.

Losing two major technical figures seemed have an inevitable effect on car development. Although F-duct and exhaust-blown diffuser upgrades arrived for the VJM03 (at Turkey and Hungary respectively) the team weren’t always getting them to work consistently, and Liuzzi in particular struggled with the blown rear wing. As the season wore on Force India saw less of Renault and Mercedes and more of Sauber and Williams in the races.

The gap between Liuzzi and Adrian Sutil was large at times. Liuzzi was usually out-qualified by his team mate and the gap was often in the region of half to a full second. Liuzzi’s best qualifying performance, sixth at Canada, was spoiled after a collision with Felipe Massa at the first corner.

== Season summary ==
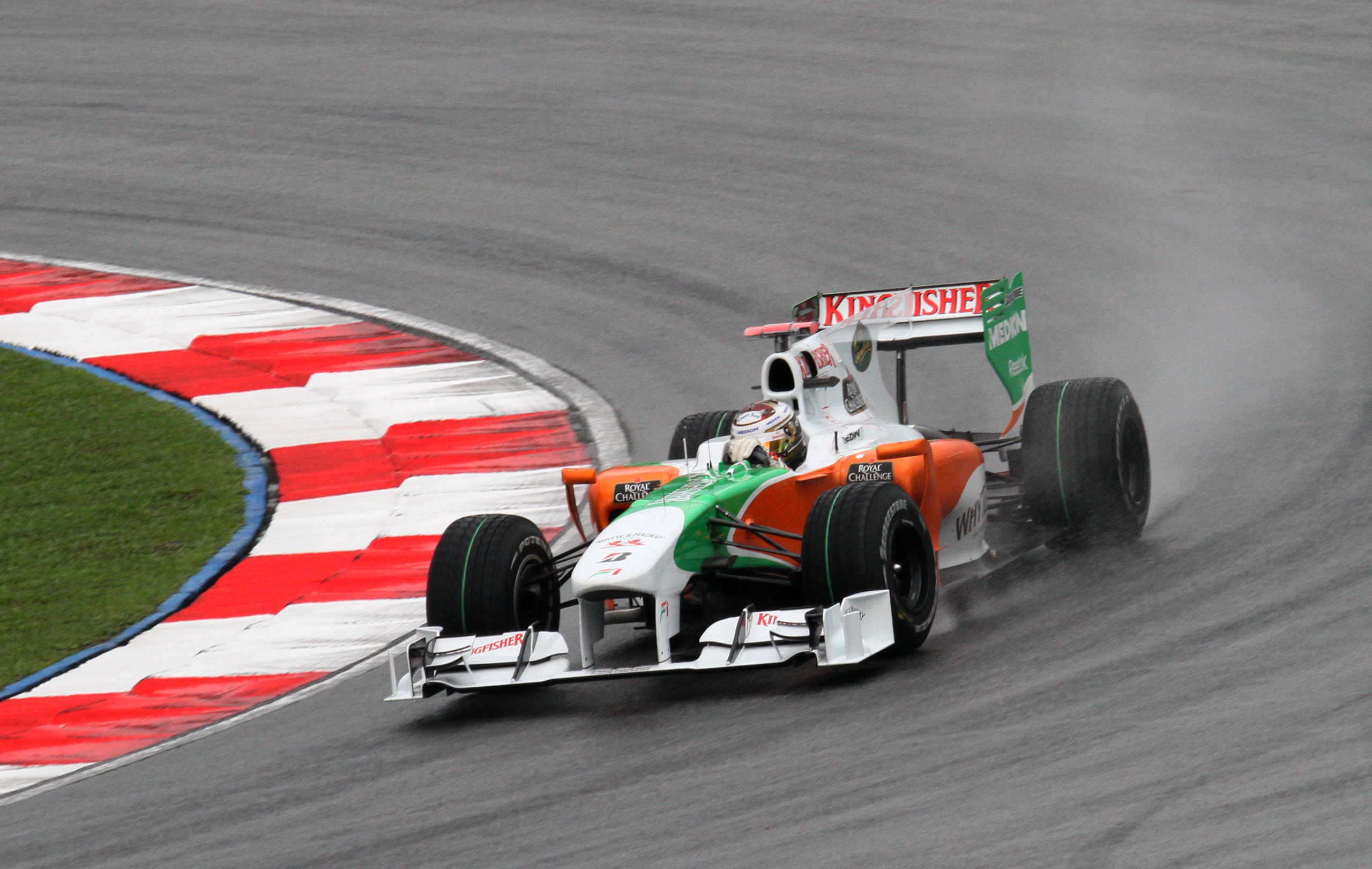
Sutil qualified fourth for the Malaysian Grand Prix.

In Bahrain, Sutil finished first in FP1. Sutil and Liuzzi then qualified 10th and 12th respectively. Liuzzi finished ninth, scoring two points, while Sutil spun in an oil leak caused by Mark Webber in the Red Bull before finishing outside the points, in twelfth position.

== Sponsorship and livery ==
As with its predecessor, the livery was retained with a new graphics; emblazoning the team's Indian identity. All of the sponsors from previous season were renewed with a new sponsorship from Doublemint.

== Complete Formula One results ==
(key) (results in bold indicate pole position; results in italics indicate fastest lap)

Year	Entrant	Engine	Tyres	Drivers	1	2	3	4	5	6	7	8	9	10	11	12	13	14	15	16	17	18	19	Points	WCC
2010	Force India F1 Team	Mercedes FO 108X V8	**B**		BHR	AUS	MAL	CHN	ESP	MON	TUR	CAN	EUR	GBR	GER	HUN	BEL	ITA	SIN	JPN	KOR	BRA	ABU	68	7th
2010	Force India F1 Team	Mercedes FO 108X V8	**B**	Sutil	12	Ret	5	11	7	8	9	10	6	8	17	Ret	5	16	9	Ret	Ret	12	13	68	7th
2010	Force India F1 Team	Mercedes FO 108X V8	**B**	Liuzzi	9	7	Ret	Ret	15^{†}	9	13	9	16	11	16	13	10	12	Ret	Ret	6	Ret	Ret	68	7th

^{†} Driver failed to finish, but was classified as they had completed >90% of the race distance.
