= 2011 Belgian Grand Prix =

Race 12 of 19 in the 2011 Formula One World Championship
← Previous race	Next race →
- Layout of the Spa-Francorchamps circuit

Race details
- Date: 28 August 2011
- Official name: 2011 Formula 1 Shell Belgian Grand Prix
- Location: Circuit de Spa-Francorchamps, Francorchamps, Wallonia, Belgium
- Course: Permanent racing facility
- Course length: 7.004 km (4.352 miles)
- Distance: 44 laps, 308.052 km (191.415 miles)
- Weather: Cloudy, dry

Pole position
Driver	(Germany) Sebastian Vettel	Red Bull Racing-Renault
- Time: 1:48.298

Fastest lap
Driver	(Australia) Mark Webber	Red Bull Racing-Renault
- Time: 1:49.883 on lap 33

Podium
First	(Germany) Sebastian Vettel	Red Bull Racing-Renault
Second	(Australia) Mark Webber	Red Bull Racing-Renault
Third	(United Kingdom) Jenson Button	McLaren-Mercedes

The 2011 Belgian Grand Prix, formally the 2011 Formula 1 Shell Belgian Grand Prix, was a Formula One motor race that was held on 28 August 2011, at the Circuit de Spa-Francorchamps near the village of Francorchamps, Wallonia, Belgium. It was the twelfth round of the 2011 FIA Formula One World Championship and the 67th Belgian Grand Prix to be held. The 44-lap race was won by Red Bull Racing's Sebastian Vettel, the drivers' championship leader, after starting from pole position. Vettel's teammate Mark Webber finished in second place, and Jenson Button completed the podium in third position for McLaren.

As a consequence of the race, Vettel extended his lead in the World Drivers' Championship to 92 points over Webber. Fernando Alonso, fourth in the race, moved into third place in the championship, ten points behind Webber in second, and eight ahead of Button. In the World Constructors' Championship, Red Bull extended their championship lead to 131 points over McLaren, with Ferrari a further 64 points behind in third position.

== Report ==
=== Background ===
The FIA banned the use of DRS through the Eau Rouge corner, since drivers had raised safety concerns similar to those held at Monaco. The overtaking aid was not permitted between the entrance to the La Source hairpin and the top of the hill after Eau Rouge. The DRS zone for the race was from Raidillon, along the Kemmel Straight until Les Combes.

Tyre supplier Pirelli brought its white-banded medium compound tyre as the harder "prime" tyre and the yellow-banded soft compound as the softer "option" compound, as opposed to the previous year where Bridgestone brought the hard compound as the prime.

After completing a practice session for Renault at the Hungaroring, Bruno Senna was promoted to a race seat for the Belgian Grand Prix, replacing Nick Heidfeld. The race weekend also marked the twentieth anniversary of Michael Schumacher's Formula One debut at the 1991 Belgian Grand Prix. Schumacher wore a special gold helmet to commemorate the occasion.

Prior to the summer break, Sebastian Vettel had yet again extended his lead, in the previous race, in Hungary to 85 points over teammate Mark Webber, on 234. Webber on 149, was 3 points ahead of Lewis Hamilton and 4 ahead of Fernando Alonso. Jenson Button was ranked fifth in the standings, on 134 points, after winning the last race. As far as Constructors were concerned, Red Bull Racing held the lead with 383 points, however McLaren had closed the gap, but were still 103 points behind on 280. Third placed team Ferrari were on 215 points, and had a big gap to the ongoing Mercedes and Renault scrap for fourth place.

=== Free Practice ===
The first Friday session was declared wet following a shower shortly before the pit lane opened. The Mercedes cars of Michael Schumacher and Nico Rosberg set the early pace, with lap times well under two minutes. They remained unthreatened at the top of the time sheets for the remainder of the session; Jenson Button was third-fastest with a time some nine seconds adrift of the Mercedes cars in the wet conditions. Bruno Senna's return to Formula One ended abruptly when the Brazilian driver spun at turn 9, damaging his Renault R31 enough to end his session early. Paul di Resta had a similar episode at the same corner several minutes later, forcing the session to be red-flagged while his Force India VJM04 was craned away.

The second session was similarly rain-affected, with only limited running taking place before the rain returned; however, the gaps between drivers were not as extreme as those witnessed during the morning session. Mark Webber set the fastest time of the session, four seconds faster than Schumacher's time in the morning session. Fernando Alonso was second ahead of Button and Lewis Hamilton. The session was free of incidents, though Renault's Vitaly Petrov suffered a steering problem that saw him finish the 90-minute session in 24th and last place having done no dry running in the session.

The final session on Saturday morning was once again declared wet; so wet that most drivers did not venture out until the final few minutes of the session. Mark Webber was once again fastest, ahead of Lewis Hamilton and Jaime Alguersuari. Ferrari completed very little running and finished the session 23rd and 24th, with Felipe Massa recording just seven laps and Fernando Alonso failing to set a lap time despite doing an installation lap.

=== Qualifying ===
The first qualifying period began badly for Michael Schumacher, who lost a wheel on the approach to Rivage and crashed out on his warm-up lap, demoting him to 24th place on the grid, his worst starting position in his career. The circuit steadily began to dry out, and at the end of the session, Mark Webber was the fastest man on the circuit. Heikki Kovalainen edged into 17th place at the last minute and was safe from elimination at the expense of Paul di Resta. Because of the rapidly improving lap times, the Virgin of local driver Jérôme d'Ambrosio and the Hispanias of Daniel Ricciardo and Vitantonio Liuzzi all set times outside 107% of Webber's lap time, but all four of them were allowed to start the race.

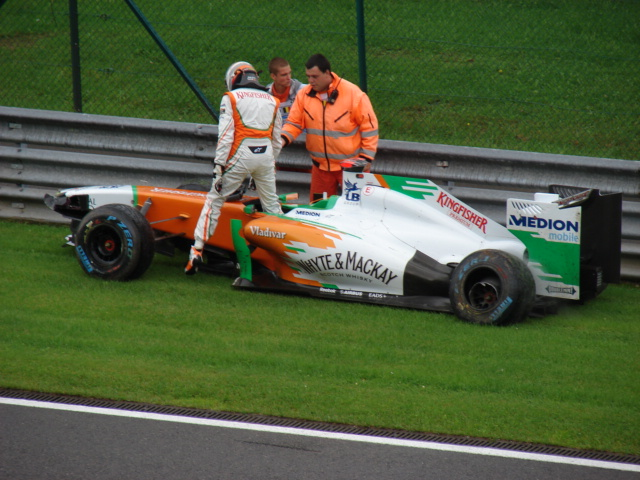
Adrian Sutil exits his car after the accident at the top of Eau Rouge.

The rain began falling again ahead of the second qualifying period, leading to a dramatic drop in lap times. Adrian Sutil crashed at the top of Eau Rouge, scattering pieces of debris across the circuit. Race control was forced to red-flag the session with seven minutes remaining in order to clear the circuit. Fernando Alonso went on to set the fastest lap time of the session, while Jenson Button moved over for Lewis Hamilton to allow the 2008 World Champion a clear lap to qualify for the third and final period. Button ultimately qualified 13th, behind Sébastien Buemi and Kamui Kobayashi, and ahead of Rubens Barrichello, Sutil – whose time was fast enough for 15th position despite causing the session to be stopped – Pastor Maldonado and Heikki Kovalainen.

In the final few seconds of Q2, four cars attempted to clear the Bus Stop chicane, including Lewis Hamilton and Pastor Maldonado. None of the cars was able to cross the start/finish line in time to be allowed to complete another timed lap, Hamilton passed Maldonado with an aggressive move, forcing Maldonado wide on the exit of the chicane. Replays then showed Maldonado's Williams swiping across Hamilton's McLaren on the approach to Eau Rouge after the session had ended, damaging Hamilton's car enough to force McLaren to make impromptu repairs to the front wing, and the sidepod was repaired by tape in the short break before Q3. Maldonado was later penalised five grid slots because of the incident. Hamilton received a reprimand and a warning from the stewards for being partly to blame for the incident as he turned right slightly on the approach to Eau Rouge, before Maldonado moved left, striking the McLaren's front wing and sidepod.

McLaren was able to repair Hamilton's car in time for the final qualifying period, for which a queue of cars formed in the pitlane as a dry line formed around the circuit, allowing the drivers to use the dry slick tyres for the first time during the weekend. Lap times fell rapidly during the session, with several drivers claiming provisional pole before the flag fell. Sebastian Vettel prevailed, achieving his ninth pole of the season, ahead of Lewis Hamilton and Mark Webber. Felipe Massa out-qualified Alonso in fourth, whilst Nico Rosberg took fifth place ahead of Jaime Alguersuari and Bruno Senna. Fernando Alonso finished the session eighth, with Sergio Pérez in ninth and Vitaly Petrov in tenth.

=== Race ===
In the build-up to the race, several teams requested that the FIA make available several sets of additional tyres after discovering problem with blistering – a result of continued racing at excessively high temperatures, causing air bubbles to form under the topmost layer of rubber – immediately after qualifying. This would force several drivers to start the race on compromised tyres. However, the FIA denied the request as the damage to the tyres had been done as a result of extreme camber settings in the car set-up; under the rules set forth by the sporting regulations, teams may replace tyres if they have been damaged, but only if the damage is a result of an accident. If the tyres are damaged as a result of car set-up, the teams would not be permitted to change their tyres. The affected drivers would have the option of changing their camber settings, but this would be in breach of parc fermé regulations and would force any driver who chose to do so to start from the pit lane, effectively moving them to the back of the grid.

The start was messy, with two separate incidents in the first corner. Sebastian Vettel started strongly, but Nico Rosberg made a fast start from fifth on the grid and claimed the early lead. By contrast, Mark Webber made a very poor start, his Red Bull RB7 dropping into anti-stall. Bruno Senna braked too late at La Source and made heavy contact with Jaime Alguersuari in the first corner, pushing the Toro Rosso into the Ferrari of Fernando Alonso. Alonso escaped unscathed, but Alguersuari was forced to retire with front suspension damage. Senna had to pit for repairs, and was subsequently given a drive-through penalty for causing an avoidable accident. As the cars filtered through the first corner, Timo Glock made contact with Paul di Resta, earning a drive-through penalty of his own, while the Lotuses spun trying to avoid the Glock-di Resta incident. Jenson Button's car was damaged by debris from Senna's Lotus, forcing him to make an unscheduled stop to replace his front wing. He also lost his right mirror, but the advantage of his pit stop was that he was able to change onto the softer option tyres, having started the race on the slower primes.

Nico Rosberg led the field though Eau Rouge for the first time, but was powerless to fend off Sebastian Vettel when the DRS zone was activated on lap three. Rosberg spent the rest of his first stint falling victim to several other drivers, slipping down the order, whilst Schumacher was doing the exact opposite, climbing to 15th on the first lap. The pre-race controversy surrounding tyre blistering came to a head on lap five, when the first round of pit stops began. Mark Webber pitted first, followed by Vettel, briefly handing the lead back to Rosberg before he was overtaken by Alonso along the Kemmel Straight. The Spaniard then held the lead until his own pitstop two laps later, with Hamilton inheriting the lead. Alonso emerged from the pits to find Webber right behind him, and the Australian and the Spaniard raced side-by-side through Eau Rouge, with Webber prevailing. Behind them, Sébastien Buemi in the second Toro Rosso was forced to retire when he was hit from behind by Sergio Pérez, destroying his rear wing. Hamilton pitted on lap 11 and conceded the lead to Vettel.

Throughout the first phase of the race, two drivers steadily began to make inroads on the field. Jenson Button, who had completed his first pit stop for a new front wing, and Michael Schumacher, who had started 24th and had managed to avoid the chaos at the first corner, both began to climb up through the midfield and were ideally placed when the safety car was deployed on lap 13. Hamilton, having just passed Kobayashi, moved to the left on the racing line leading into Les Combes. However, Kobayashi had not yet relinquished the position and was still on Hamilton's outside. The Sauber and the McLaren made contact, and Hamilton spun off and hit the barrier, and he retired from the race. Kobayashi was able to continue, but Daniel Ricciardo also stopped on the circuit after experiencing a vibration in his Hispania F111, and retired from 16th place. The safety car triggered a second round of stops among the leaders. Alonso regained the lead by staying out, while Webber opted to do the same and moved up to second ahead of Vettel, who had pitted.

With the wreckage from Hamilton's accident cleared, the safety car left the circuit and racing resumed on lap 17. Vettel almost immediately overtook Webber on the run down to Eau Rouge and then attempted to pass Alonso down the Kemmel Straight. Though the latter resisted the initial attempt, Vettel managed to overtake the Ferrari into Les Combes on the following lap and re-established his lead ahead of Alonso and Webber. Further back, Jenson Button was making his way through the field at a rate that suggested he had the potential to win the race. He inherited the lead on lap 32 after both Red Bulls pitted, but was overtaken by Vettel on the Kemmel Straight and was forced to pit himself for the final time, emerging behind Alonso and Webber. Alonso was unable to defend against Webber, nor against Button several laps later. Button briefly attempted to catch Webber, but decided against it as it meant risking an extra pit stop. Further down the order, Michael Schumacher had recovered from 24th on the grid to sixth overall, before passing Nico Rosberg on the approach to Les Combes. Sergio Pérez became the fifth and final retirement of the race when his suspension failed, and he was able to limp back to the pits.

Vettel went on to win the race, three seconds ahead of Webber in second and nine seconds ahead of Button in third. Alonso, who had struggled all race with a lack of grip, finished fourth ahead of Schumacher and Rosberg. Adrian Sutil finished seventh, while Felipe Massa was eighth; the Brazilian driver had pitted on lap 30, but picked up a puncture on his out-lap, forcing him to re-pit immediately. Vitaly Petrov finished ninth after a brake failure cost him ten seconds and eighth place on the final lap. After the controversy in qualifying, Pastor Maldonado recovered from 21st on the grid to finish tenth, achieving his first World Championship point, the first for a Venezuelan driver since Johnny Cecotto at the 1983 United States Grand Prix West, as well as scoring Cosworth's last points. His teammate, Rubens Barrichello, finished 16th behind the Lotuses of Jarno Trulli and Heikki Kovalainen after a collision with Kobayashi at the Bus Stop chicane forced him to pit for a new front wing.

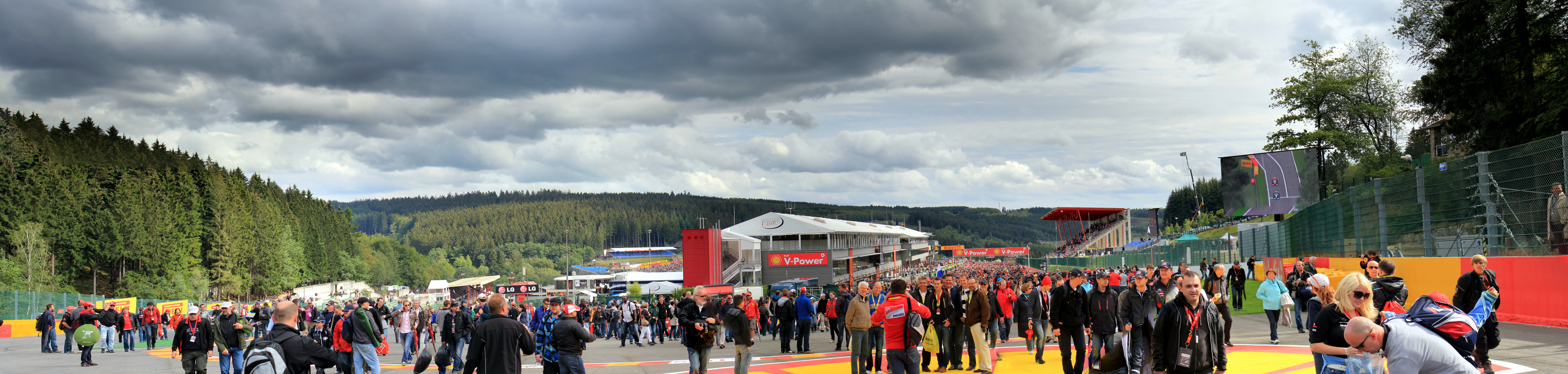
A view from La Source after the race finish.

=== Post-Race ===
In light of the pre-race controversy over tyre blistering, Pirelli accused Red Bull Racing of putting them in an "impossible" position by lobbying for extra sets of tyres to be made available after they went outside Pirelli's recommended camber settings when setting up their cars. Paul Hembery, Pirelli's motorsport director, later stated that the company would be "more cautious" when recommending settings for the Italian Grand Prix with a view to preventing the blistering issue from arising again.

Lewis Hamilton had initially been critical of Kamui Kobayashi following their race-ending collision on lap twelve, saying that the crash had cost him the opportunity of a podium place. Kobayashi denied any wrongdoing, saying that he had kept as far to the side of the track as possible to allow Hamilton through and that the only way to avoid a collision was to go off the circuit. After seeing replays of the incident, Hamilton agreed with the stewards' decision, adding, "I didn't give Kobayashi enough room though, I thought I was past."

Bruno Senna also admitted that it was his error and miscalculation of the La Source corner that made him collide against Jaime Alguersuari.

== Classification ==
=== Qualifying ===
Pos	No	Driver	Constructor	Part 1	Part 2	Part 3	Grid
1	1	(Germany) Sebastian Vettel	Red Bull Racing-Renault	2:03.029	2:03.317	1:48.298	1
2	3	(United Kingdom) Lewis Hamilton	McLaren-Mercedes	2:03.008	2:02.823	1:48.730	2
3	2	(Australia) Mark Webber	Red Bull Racing-Renault	2:02.827	2:03.302	1:49.376	3
4	6	(Brazil) Felipe Massa	Ferrari	2:05.834	2:04.507	1:50.256	4
5	8	(Germany) Nico Rosberg	Mercedes	2:05.091	2:03.723	1:50.552	5
6	19	(Spain) Jaime Alguersuari	Toro Rosso-Ferrari	2:05.419	2:04.561	1:50.773	6
7	9	(Brazil) Bruno Senna	Renault	2:05.047	2:04.452	1:51.121	7
8	5	(Spain) Fernando Alonso	Ferrari	2:04.450	2:02.768	1:51.251	8
9	17	(Mexico) Sergio Pérez	Sauber-Ferrari	2:06.284	2:04.625	1:51.374	9
10	10	(Russia) Vitaly Petrov	Renault	2:05.292	2:03.466	1:52.303	10
11	18	(Switzerland) Sébastien Buemi	Toro Rosso-Ferrari	2:04.744	2:04.692		11
12	16	(Japan) Kamui Kobayashi	Sauber-Ferrari	2:07.194	2:04.757		12
13	4	(United Kingdom) Jenson Button	McLaren-Mercedes	2:01.813	2:05.150		13
14	11	(Brazil) Rubens Barrichello	Williams-Cosworth	2:05.720	2:07.349		14
15	14	(Germany) Adrian Sutil	Force India-Mercedes	2:06.000	2:07.777		15
16	12	(Venezuela) Pastor Maldonado	Williams-Cosworth	2:05.621	2:08.106		21^{1}
17	20	(Finland) Heikki Kovalainen	Lotus-Renault	2:06.780	2:08.354		16
18	15	(United Kingdom) Paul di Resta	Force India-Mercedes	2:07.758			17
19	21	(Italy) Jarno Trulli	Lotus-Renault	2:08.773			18
20	24	(Germany) Timo Glock	Virgin-Cosworth	2:09.566			19
107% time: 2:10.339
–	25	(Belgium) Jérôme d'Ambrosio	Virgin-Cosworth	2:11.601			20^{2}
–	23	(Italy) Vitantonio Liuzzi	HRT-Cosworth	2:11.616			22^{2}
–	22	(Australia) Daniel Ricciardo	HRT-Cosworth	2:13.077			23^{2}
–	7	(Germany) Michael Schumacher	Mercedes	no time			24^{3}

1. – Pastor Maldonado was penalised 5 grid places for causing an avoidable accident with Lewis Hamilton at the end of the second qualifying session.
2. – Despite being outside the 107% margin, Jérôme d'Ambrosio, Daniel Ricciardo and Vitantonio Liuzzi were granted dispensations to race on the grounds that variable weather conditions in qualifying meant their times were not representative of their ability to qualify.
3. – Michael Schumacher was permitted to race as he had consistently been within 107% of the fastest lap times set in Free Practice.

=== Race ===
Pos	No	Driver	Constructor	Laps	Time/Retired	Grid	Points
1	1	(Germany) Sebastian Vettel	Red Bull Racing-Renault	44	1:26:44.893	1	25
2	2	(Australia) Mark Webber	Red Bull Racing-Renault	44	+3.741	3	18
3	4	(United Kingdom) Jenson Button	McLaren-Mercedes	44	+9.669	13	15
4	5	(Spain) Fernando Alonso	Ferrari	44	+13.022	8	12
5	7	(Germany) Michael Schumacher	Mercedes	44	+47.464	24	10
6	8	(Germany) Nico Rosberg	Mercedes	44	+48.674	5	8
7	14	(Germany) Adrian Sutil	Force India-Mercedes	44	+59.713	15	6
8	6	(Brazil) Felipe Massa	Ferrari	44	+1:06.706	4	4
9	10	(Russia) Vitaly Petrov	Renault	44	+1:11.917	10	2
10	12	(Venezuela) Pastor Maldonado	Williams-Cosworth	44	+1:17.615	21	1
11	15	(United Kingdom) Paul di Resta	Force India-Mercedes	44	+1:23.994	17	
12	16	(Japan) Kamui Kobayashi	Sauber-Ferrari	44	+1:31.976	12	
13	9	(Brazil) Bruno Senna	Renault	44	+1:32.985	7	
14	21	(Italy) Jarno Trulli	Lotus-Renault	43	+1 Lap	18	
15	20	(Finland) Heikki Kovalainen	Lotus-Renault	43	+1 Lap	16	
16	11	(Brazil) Rubens Barrichello	Williams-Cosworth	43	+1 Lap	14	
17	25	(Belgium) Jérôme d'Ambrosio	Virgin-Cosworth	43	+1 Lap	20	
18	24	(Germany) Timo Glock	Virgin-Cosworth	43	+1 Lap	19	
19	23	(Italy) Vitantonio Liuzzi	HRT-Cosworth	43	+1 Lap	22	
Ret	17	(Mexico) Sergio Pérez	Sauber-Ferrari	27	Suspension	9	
Ret	22	(Australia) Daniel Ricciardo	HRT-Cosworth	13	Vibration	23	
Ret	3	(United Kingdom) Lewis Hamilton	McLaren-Mercedes	12	Collision	2	
Ret	18	(Switzerland) Sébastien Buemi	Toro Rosso-Ferrari	6	Collision damage	11	
Ret	19	(Spain) Jaime Alguersuari	Toro Rosso-Ferrari	0	Collision	6	

== Championship standings after the race ==
Drivers' Championship standings

	Pos.	Driver	Points
	1	(Germany) Sebastian Vettel	259
	2	(Australia) Mark Webber	167
1	3	(Spain) Fernando Alonso	157
1	4	(United Kingdom) Jenson Button	149
2	5	(United Kingdom) Lewis Hamilton	146

Constructors' Championship standings

Pos.	Constructor	Points
1	(Austria) Red Bull Racing-Renault	426
2	(United Kingdom) McLaren-Mercedes	295
3	(Italy) Ferrari	231
4	(Germany) Mercedes	98
5	(United Kingdom) Renault	68

- Note: Only the top five positions are included for both sets of standings.

== See also ==
- 2011 Spa-Francorchamps GP2 Series round
- 2011 Spa-Francorchamps GP3 Series round

Previous race: 2011 Hungarian Grand Prix	FIA Formula One World Championship; 2011 season	Next race: 2011 Italian Grand Prix
Previous race: 2010 Belgian Grand Prix	Belgian Grand Prix	Next race: 2012 Belgian Grand Prix
