= Force India VJM04 =

2011 Formula One racing car

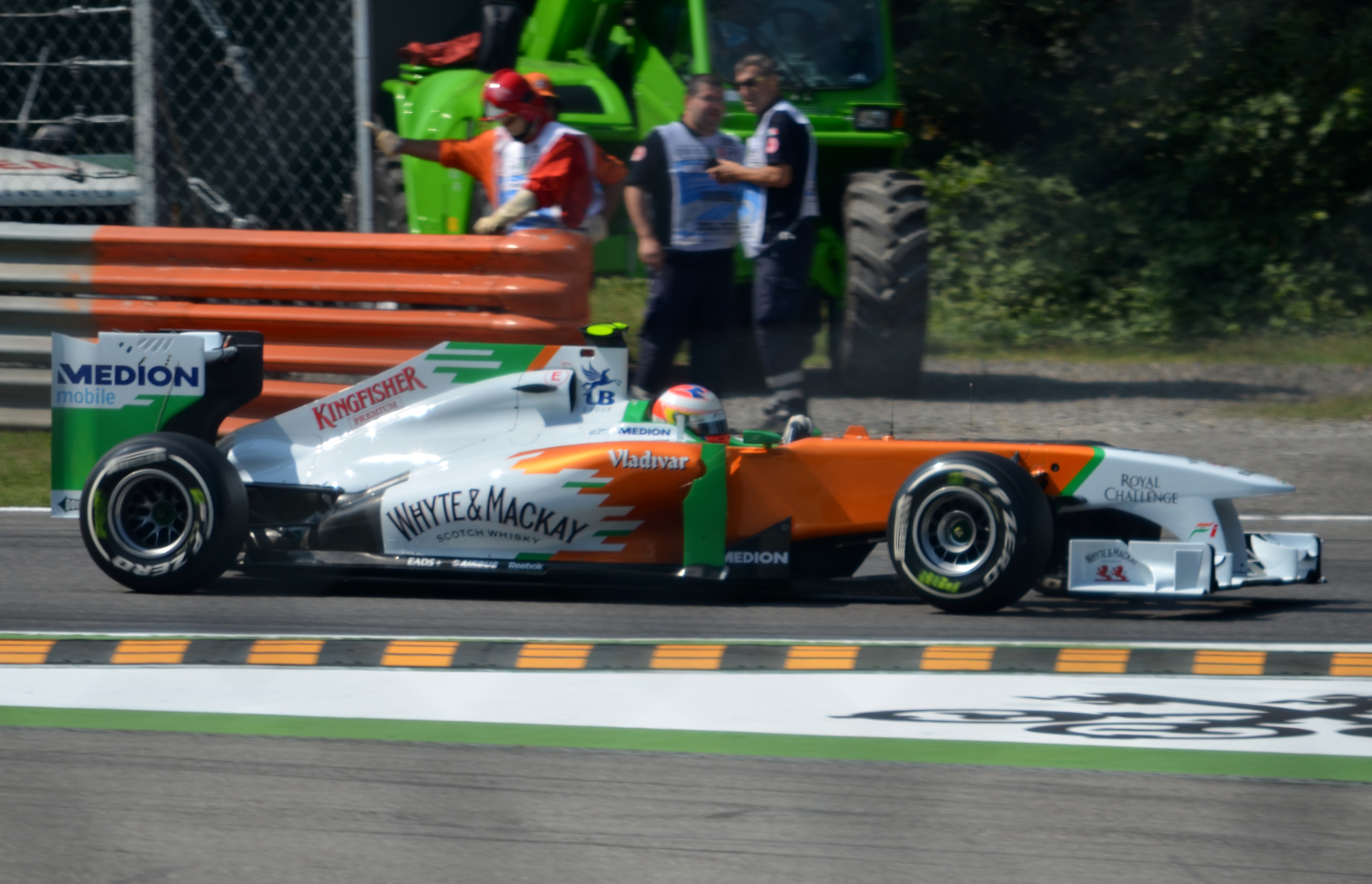
- Paul Di Resta driving the VJM04 at the Italian Grand Prix
- Category: Formula One
- Constructor: Force India
- Designers: Mark Smith (Technical Director); Andrew Green (Engineering Director); Simon Phillips (Aerodynamics Director); Ian Hall (Chief Designer); Bruce Eddington (Head of Design, Composites); Daniel Carpenter (Head of Design, Mechanical); Simon Gardner (Head of R&D); James Knapton (Head of Vehicle Science); Simon Belcher (Chief Aerodynamicist)
- Predecessor: Force India VJM03
- Successor: Force India VJM05

Technical specifications
- Chassis: Carbon fibre composite monocoque with Zylon legality side anti-intrusion panels
- Suspension (front): Aluminium uprights with carbon fibre composite wishbones, trackrod and pushrod. Inboard chassis mounted torsion springs, dampers and anti-roll bar assembly
- Suspension (rear): as front, except for trackrod and pullrod, and gearbox mounted torsion springs.
- Engine: Mercedes-Benz FO 108Y 2,400 cc (146.5 cu in) 90° V8, limited to 18,000 RPM, naturally aspirated, mid-mounted
- Transmission: McLaren Seven-speed semi-automatic gearbox with reverse gear, Electronic shift system
- Weight: 640 kg (1,411 lb) (including driver)
- Fuel: Mobil
- Tyres: Pirelli P Zero; BBS Wheels (front and rear): 13"

Competition history
- Notable entrants: Force India F1 Team (1−15); Sahara Force India F1 Team (16−19)
- Notable drivers: 14. (Germany) Adrian Sutil; 15. (United Kingdom) Paul di Resta
- Debut: 2011 Australian Grand Prix
- Last event: 2011 Brazilian Grand Prix
Races	Wins	Podiums	Poles	F/Laps
19	0	0	0	0

The Force India VJM04 is a Formula One racing car developed by Force India for the 2011 Formula One season, the fourth car the team has made since entering the sport in 2008. The car was driven by long-time Force India driver Adrian Sutil and 2010 Deutsche Tourenwagen Masters champion Paul di Resta. The car was launched online on 8 February 2011. The car took the team into 6th in the Constructors' Championship with 69 points by the end of the season.

== Season summary ==
=== First half ===
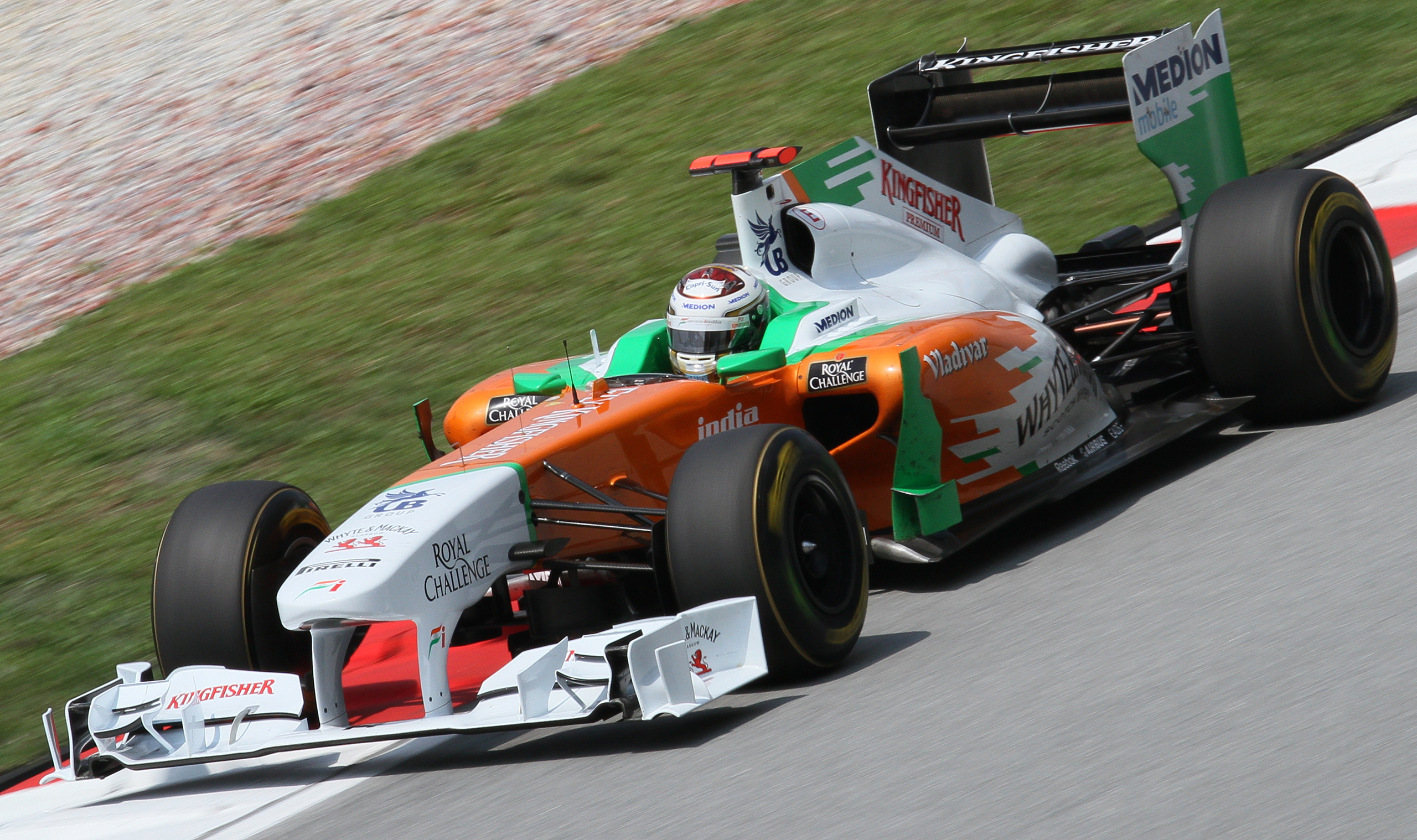
Sutil during the Malaysian Grand Prix

In the season-opening Australian Grand Prix, Sutil finished ninth and di Resta finished in tenth, scoring points in his debut race after the Saubers were disqualified.

In the Malaysian Grand Prix, di Resta finished tenth while Sutil finished right behind in 11th, outside the points.

In Chinese Grand Prix, di Resta qualified in Q3 for the first time, starting from eighth. Sutil meanwhile, missed out the final shootout with 11th. Unfortuanely, di Resta only managed to finish in 11th, while Sutil finished in 15th during the race. Force India endured a difficult Turkish Grand Prix as neither driver managed to finish in the points. Sutil finished 13th while di Resta had to retire from the race after suffering from a loose wheel.

The European and Canadian rounds kicked off with the scoreless Spanish Grand Prix, di Resta started from 16th and finished 12th ahead of Sutil finishing right behind.

The team returned to scoring ways in the Monaco Grand Prix. Sutil was running fourth at some point. However, on lap 72, contact with Pastor Maldonado and the wall triggered an incident in which Jaime Alguersuari and Vitaly Petrov crashed and the race was red-flagged. After the restart, Sutil eventually finished seventh, while di Resta had to settle for 12th after receiving a drive-through penalty for a mistimed pass on Toro Rosso's Jaime Alguersuari.

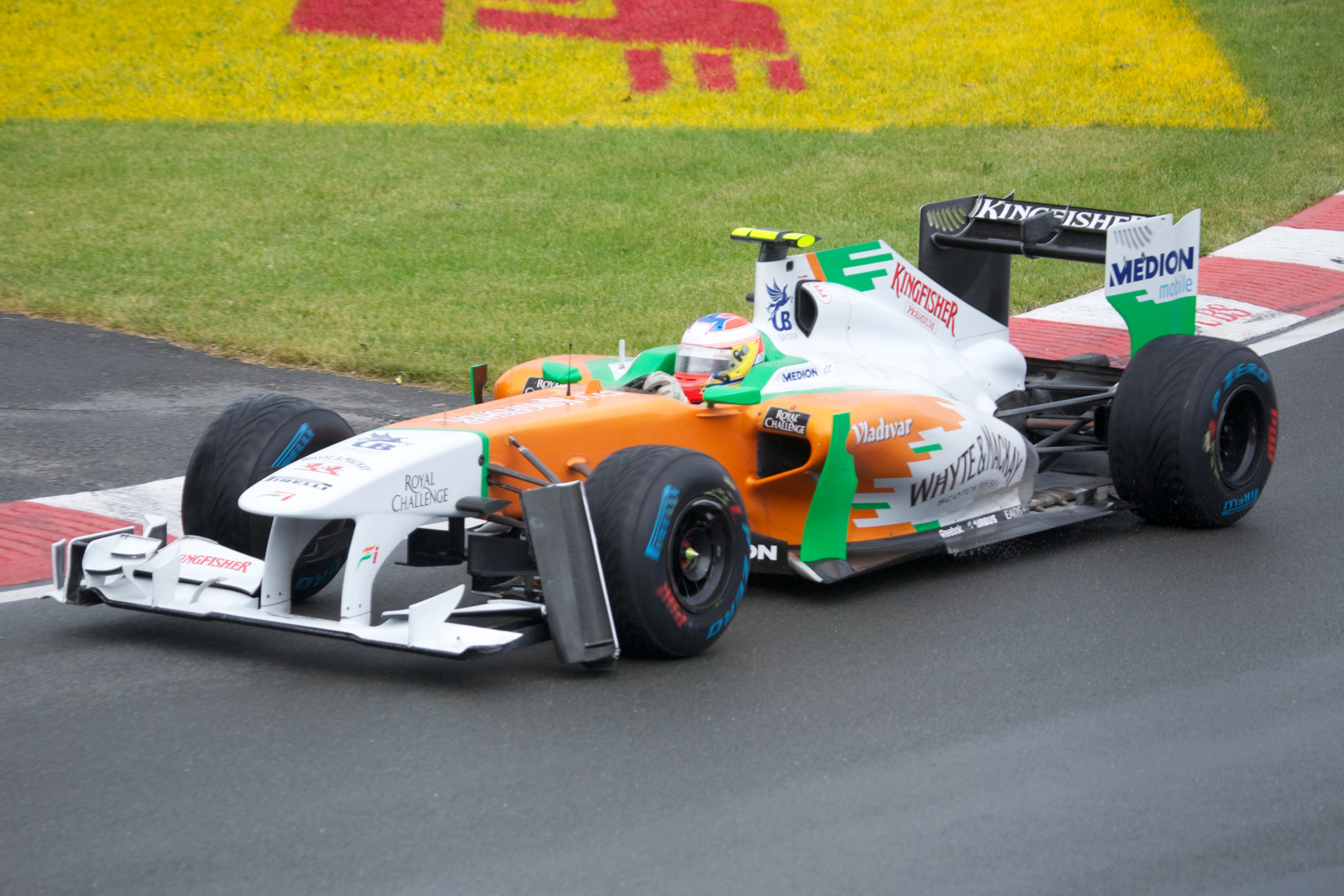
Di Resta had to retire from the Canadian Grand Prix with a puncture late in the race

The team was set for another points finish with di Resta qualified in 11th and Sutil in 14th for the Canadian Grand Prix. Both drivers had to serve their respective drive-through penalties during the race, neither cars made it to the finish line as Sutil retired on lap 49 due to taking a damage from a battle with Ferrari's Felipe Massa and di Resta retiring on lap 67 due to a puncture.

Sutil bounced back at the scorching hot European Grand Prix with a ninth-place finish while di Resta finished in frustrating 14th. The team went scoreless in the British Grand Prix, Sutil missed out with 11th while di Resta finished his home race in a distant 15th. Sutil took his joint-best result of the season with a sixth-place finish in front of the home crowd in the German Grand Prix. Di Resta endured another difficult weekend as the Briton finished 13th.

At the Hungarian Grand Prix, di Resta finally scored points for the first time since Malaysia with a strong seventh-place finish. Teammate Sutil finished outside the points in 14th.

=== Second half ===
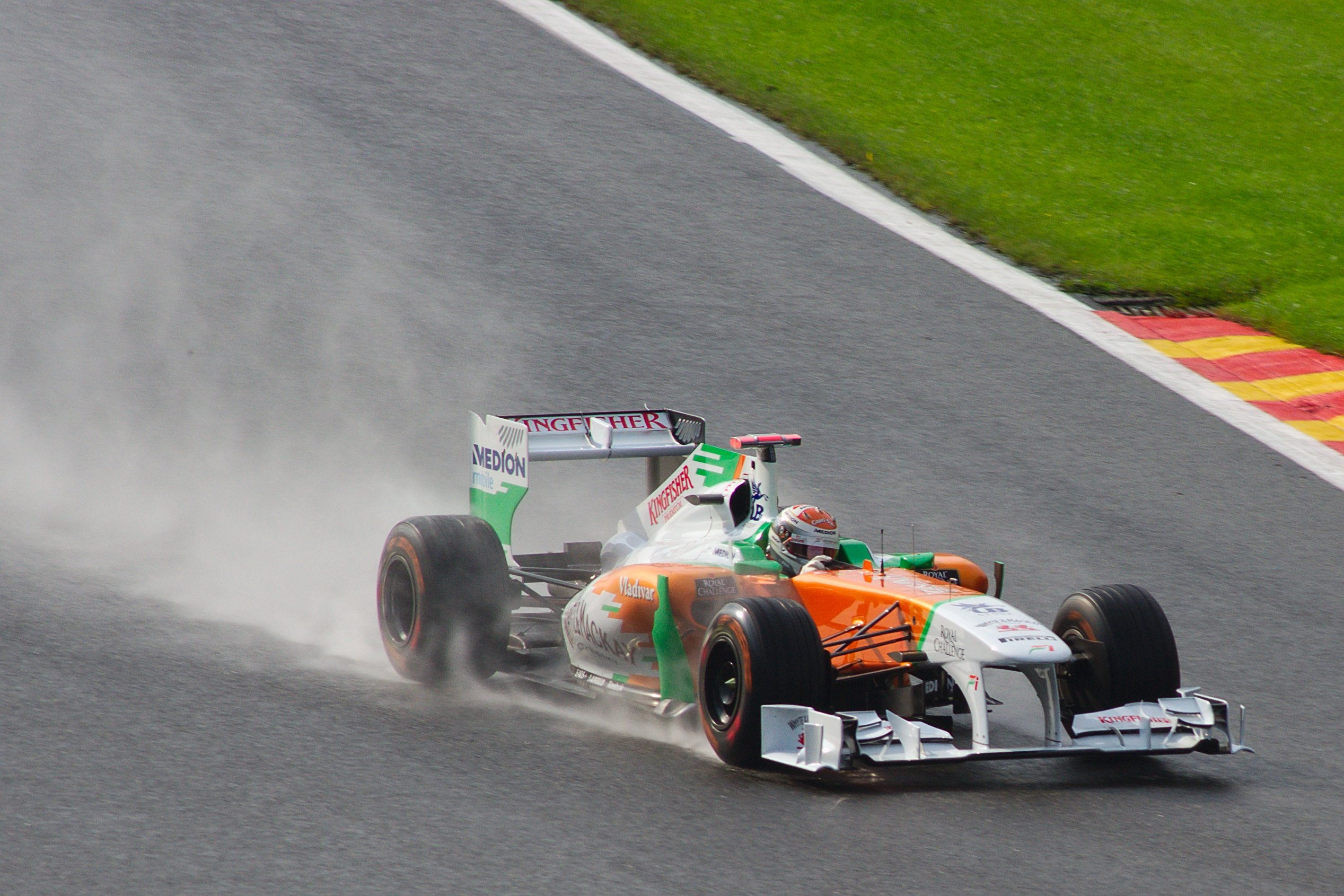
Sutil finished the Belgian Grand Prix in seventh after starting from 15th on the grid

The season resumed after the summer break with the Belgian Grand Prix. Sutil took a strong seventh-place finish for the first race of the second half of the season. Di Resta took damage after Timo Glock made contact in the middle stages, however, di Resta recovered from his poor qualifying session to finish 11th.

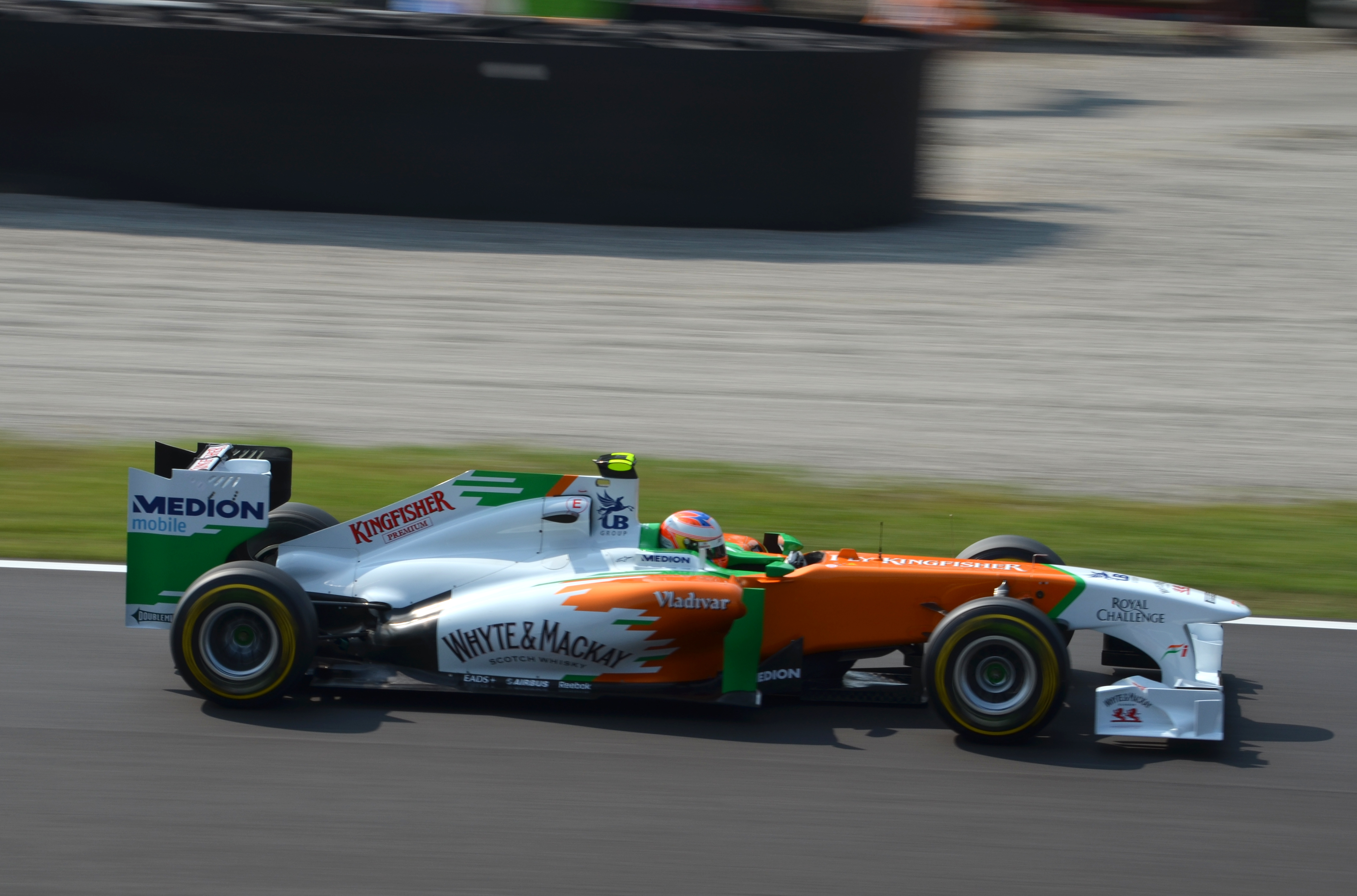
Di Resta took eighth in Italy

In Italy, the team was on course for a points-finish contention with di Resta lining up from 11th after being beaten to Q3 by Renault's Bruno Senna. Sutil qualified right behind di Resta in 12th. Di Resta took eighth in the race while Sutil retired with a hydraulics issue.

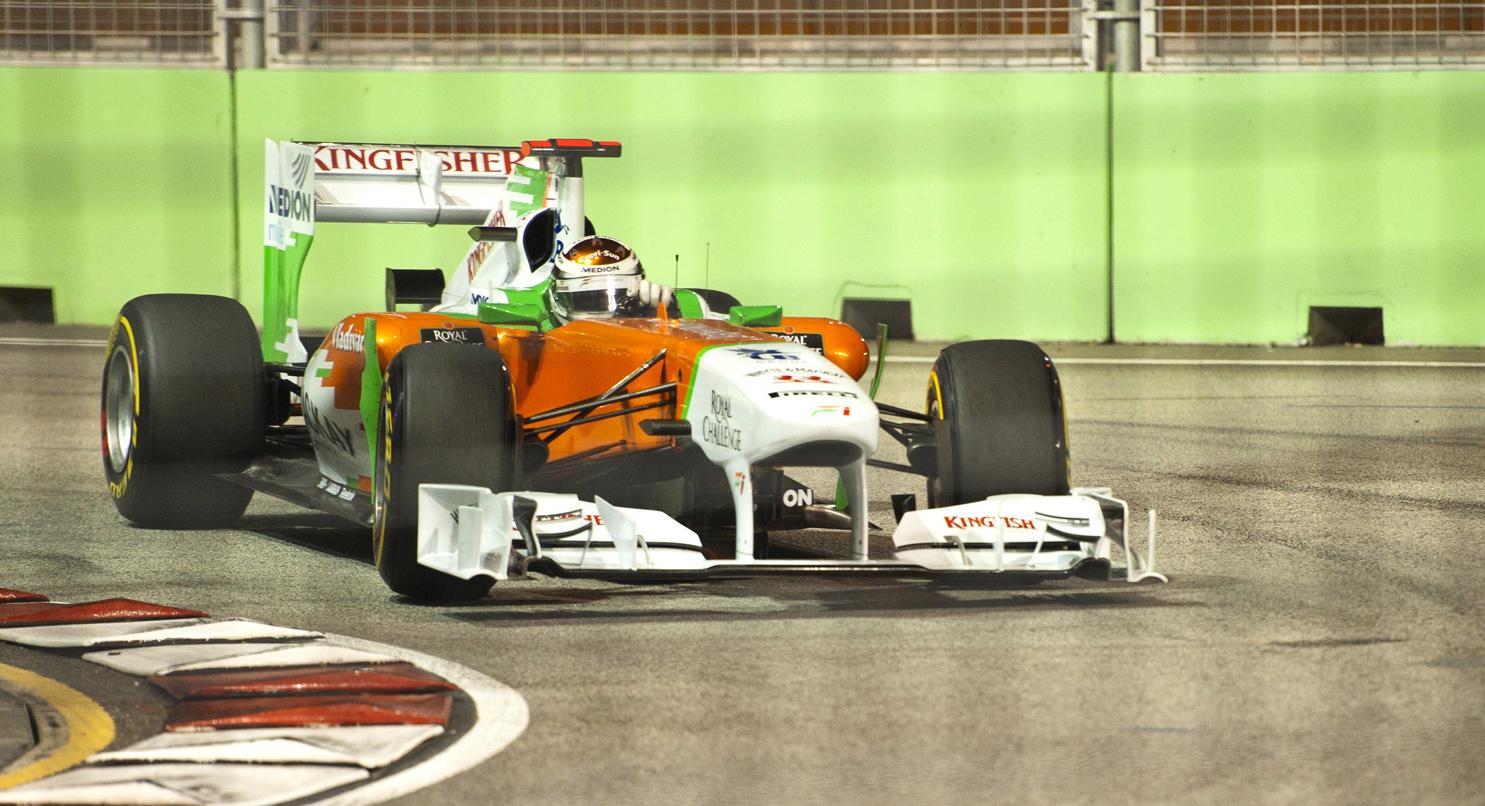
Sutil took eighth in Singapore as the team scored their first double points-finish of the season

Both cars made it into Q3 in Singapore, with Sutil starting from ninth and di Resta from tenth due to the team being content enough not to send the drivers out for the final shootout. The team went on to score their first double points-finish of the season with di Resta achieving career-best sixth and Sutil in eighth.

Sutil outqualified di Resta in Japan as the former started from 11th while the latter started from 12th. The drivers were unable to progress from their starting grid and finished the race in the position they started.

Team principal Vijay Mallya was confident that the team could snatch fifth from Renault's hands in the last four rounds. Both drivers made it into Q3, rounding off the fifth row in Korea. It was Di Resta who scored the team's sole points in the race with tenth-place finish while Sutil ended the afternoon outside the points by finishing 11th.

During the team's home race at the inaugural Indian Grand Prix, Sutil finished ninth after having a battle with his teammate midway through the race. Di Resta finished the race in 13th.

Force India entered the penultimate round in Yas Marina with a good form after both drivers made it into Q3. What follows was the team's second double points-finish with Sutil finishing eighth and Di Resta in ninth during the race.

The team's final double points-finish at the final round was ultimately not enough to overtake Renault's 73 points for fifth with only four points separating them.

== Sponsorship and livery ==
The livery were not many that changed by retaining the same colour and redesigned graphics. Retaining sponsors including Whyte & Mackay, Kingfisher, Reebok, Doublemint and Medion; until Sutil departed from the team. Ahead of the Korean Grand Prix, Sahara India Pariwar had purchased a 42.5% stake from the team as a co-ownership from the team principal, Vijay Mallya.

The team paid tribute to the Tōhoku earthquake and tsunami at the Australian Grand Prix. At the Malaysian Grand Prix, the team paid tribute to the Indian cricket team that won the 2010 ICC World Twenty20. At the Turkish Grand Prix, Whyte & Mackay was replaced with a "One in a Billion Hunt" contest. At the Indian Grand Prix, the team promoted the film Ra.One, featured on the nose cone.

== Complete Formula One results ==
(key) (results in bold indicate pole position; results in italics indicate fastest lap)

Year	Entrant	Engine	Tyres	Drivers	1	2	3	4	5	6	7	8	9	10	11	12	13	14	15	16	17	18	19	Points	WCC
2011	Force India F1 Team	Mercedes FO 108Y V8	**P**		AUS	MAL	CHN	TUR	ESP	MON	CAN	EUR	GBR	GER	HUN	BEL	ITA	SIN	JPN	KOR	IND	ABU	BRA	**69**	**6th**
2011	Force India F1 Team	Mercedes FO 108Y V8	**P**	Sutil	9	11	15	13	13	7	Ret	9	11	6	14	7	Ret	8	11	11	9	8	6	**69**	**6th**
2011	Force India F1 Team	Mercedes FO 108Y V8	**P**	di Resta	10	10	11	Ret	12	12	18 ^{†}	14	15	13	7	11	8	6	12	10	13	9	8	**69**	**6th**

^{†} Driver failed to finish the race, but was classified as they had completed >90% of the race distance.
