= 2011 Italian Grand Prix =

Race 13 of 19 in the 2011 Formula One World Championship
← Previous race	Next race →
- Autodromo Nazionale di Monza

Race details
- Date: 11 September 2011
- Official name: Formula 1 Gran Premio Santander d'Italia 2011
- Location: Autodromo Nazionale di Monza, Monza, Italy
- Course: Permanent racing facility
- Course length: 5.793 km (3.6 miles)
- Distance: 53 laps, 306.720 km (190.58 miles)
- Weather: Mainly sunny

Pole position
Driver	(Germany) Sebastian Vettel	Red Bull Racing-Renault
- Time: 1:22.275

Fastest lap
Driver	(United Kingdom) Lewis Hamilton	McLaren-Mercedes
- Time: 1:26.187 on lap 52

Podium
First	(Germany) Sebastian Vettel	Red Bull Racing-Renault
Second	(United Kingdom) Jenson Button	McLaren-Mercedes
Third	(Spain) Fernando Alonso	Ferrari

The 2011 Italian Grand Prix (officially the Formula 1 Gran Premio Santander d'Italia 2011) was a Formula One motor race that was held on 11 September 2011 at the Autodromo Nazionale di Monza in Italy. It was the thirteenth round of the 2011 Formula One season and was also the sixtieth time the Italian Grand Prix had been held at Monza. The 53-lap race was won by Red Bull Racing's Sebastian Vettel, the World Drivers' Championship leader, after he started from pole position. Jenson Button finished in second place for McLaren, and Fernando Alonso completed the podium in third position for Ferrari.

As a consequence of the race, Vettel extended his lead in the World Drivers' Championship to 112 points over Alonso, who moved up to second place in the championship. Button moved into third place in the championship, five points behind Alonso, and level on points with fourth-placed Mark Webber, but ahead on countback. In the World Constructors' Championship, Red Bull's championship lead was cut by McLaren to 126 points, with Ferrari a further 71 points behind in third position.

To celebrate the 150th anniversary of the unification of Italy a special trophy (named Coppa del 150° Anniversario dell'Unità d'Italia) was awarded to the winner. The same trophy was also awarded to the winner of 2011 Giro d'Italia (cycling, won by Michele Scarponi) and 2010-2011 Coppa Italia (football, won by Inter Milan). The special trophy was designed by the Italian sculptor Silvio Gazzaniga.

== Report ==
=== Background ===
Tyre supplier Pirelli brought its white-banded medium compound tyre as the harder "prime" tyre and the yellow-banded soft compound as the softer "option" compound, as opposed to the previous year where Bridgestone brought the hard compound as the prime.

==== Regulation changes ====
The Belgian Grand Prix saw a small controversy when several teams discovered their tyres had blistered during qualifying, but were not permitted to change their tyres ahead of the race because the damage was the result of the car set-up rather than an accident. Tyre supplier Pirelli pointed to Red Bull Racing's practice of running camber settings that were outside the recommended parameters given by Pirelli as the cause of the blistering, and said they would be more cautious with their recommendations for Monza to prevent the problem from arising again. Pirelli stated that they were willing to turn to the FIA to enforce camber limits if there was any evidence of blistering after the Free Practice sessions. Shortly before the final practice session on Saturday, the FIA announced that Pirelli's camber limits were mandatory and that any team who failed to observe them would be reported to the stewards under Article 2.3 of the sport's technical regulations for dangerous construction and would risk exclusion from the race.

==== Circuit changes ====
After experimenting with two Drag Reduction System (DRS) zones with one activation point in Montreal and Valencia, the FIA reverted to a single DRS zone for Silverstone. At the Belgian Grand Prix, it was announced that the Italian Grand Prix would once again see two DRS zones, but this time, each zone would be independent, with one activation point for each zone. One of these zones will be placed along the main straight of the circuit, with reports suggesting that the second zone would be placed along the straight between the second Curva di Lesmo and the Variante Ascari chicane.

On Saturday morning, the FIA modified the della Roggia chicane, moving the kerbs at both corners back five metres to allow the drivers more space to navigate the chicane without being forced over the kerbs.

==== Team changes ====
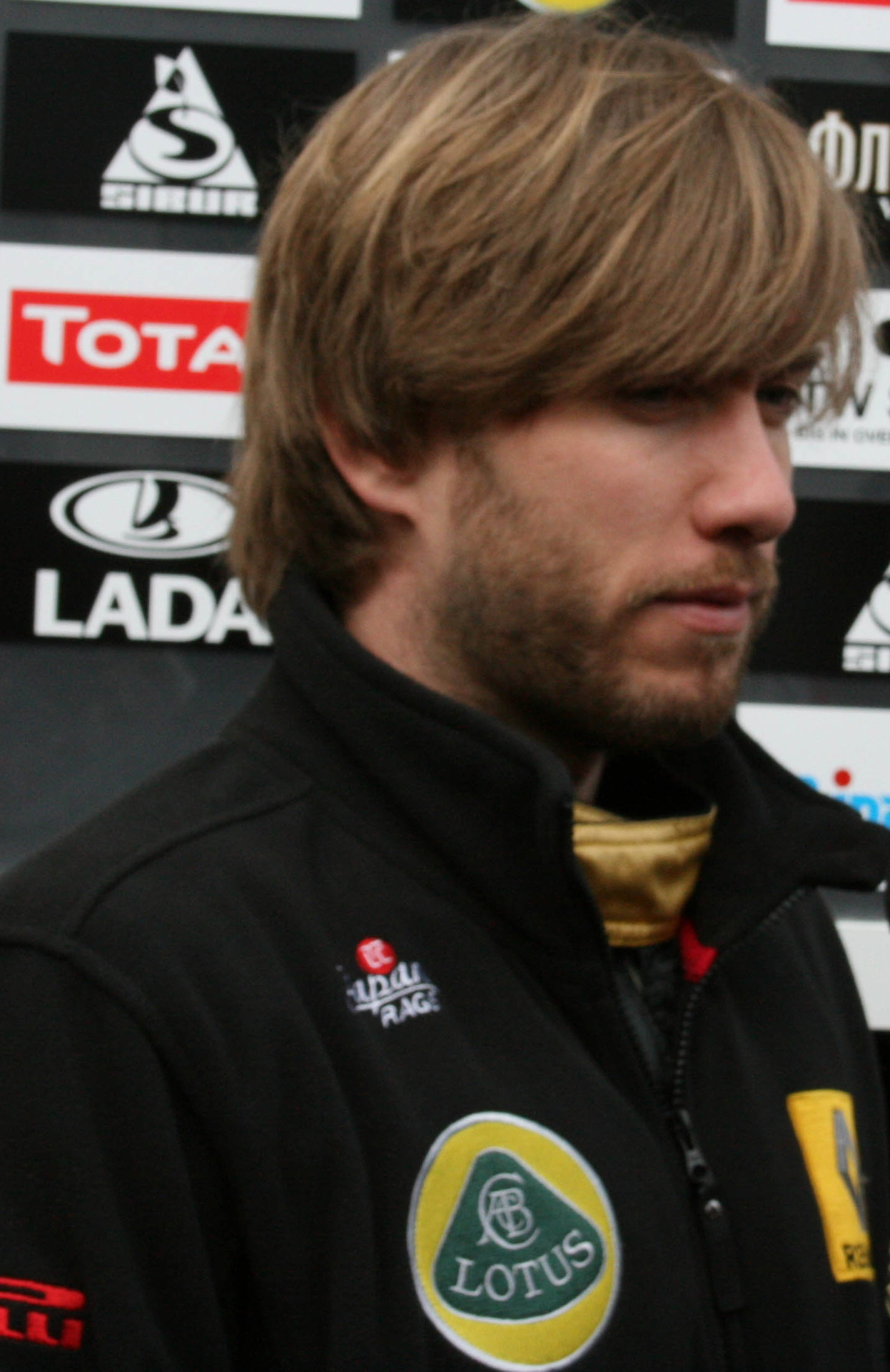
The Renault team announced that Nick Heidfeld would be replaced for the rest of the season, by Bruno Senna.

Bruno Senna replaced Nick Heidfeld at Renault for the Belgian Grand Prix, though Heidfeld expressed dissatisfaction with the appointment and stated that he hoped to return to racing for them at the Singapore Grand Prix and to finish the season driving for Renault, going so far to launch legal action against the team. In the week before the Italian Grand Prix, it was announced that Heidfeld and Renault had reached a settlement, allowing Senna to complete the season in Heidfeld's place. Senna's appointment prompted four new sponsors – Brazilian telecommunications company Embratel, oil and natural gas company OGX, personal care brand Gillette and pharmaceutical company Auden McKenzie – to join the team.

After shelving a planned upgrade for the British Grand Prix in light of a technical review of the team, Virgin Racing decided to re-introduce the upgrade for the Italian Grand Prix. The upgrade is a complete overhaul of the Virgin MVR-02, including a new engine cover, sidepods, exhaust and rear floor.

==== Standings ====
Heading into the race, Sebastian Vettel was leading the Drivers' Championship on 259 points - a massive 92 ahead of Red Bull Racing teammate Mark Webber, after the pair had a 1-2 finish in Spa. Fernando Alonso sat third in the standings, 10 points behind Webber on 157. The McLaren duo of Jenson Button and Lewis Hamilton were now occupying fourth and fifth in the standings, with 149 and 146 points respectively. Hamilton had slipped to fifth, behind Button, because of his collision at the last race with Kamui Kobayashi.

Red Bull led the Constructors' Championship, in a similar dominant fashion to Vettel, with 426 points. McLaren were 131 points behind on 295 points and Ferrari were third placed, 64 points behind McLaren. Mercedes and Renault had quite a gap to Ferrari, and were fourth and fifth placed, on 98 and 68 points respectively.

=== Free Practice ===
The Friday practice sessions were dry, with predictions of similar weather to last the entire weekend. The first ninety-minute period was quiet, with just two drivers setting times in the first half-hour. Once the entire grid started setting times, Sebastian Vettel emerged as the early leader of the session. However, Lewis Hamilton rapidly improved his lap times, and would end the session as the fastest man on track, a second clear of teammate Jenson Button and a further half-second ahead of Vettel. Button reported that the circuit had been resurfaced since the 2010 race, causing the cars to slide about. Meanwhile, several cars – most notably the Lotus and Virgin entries – were plagued with technical problems.

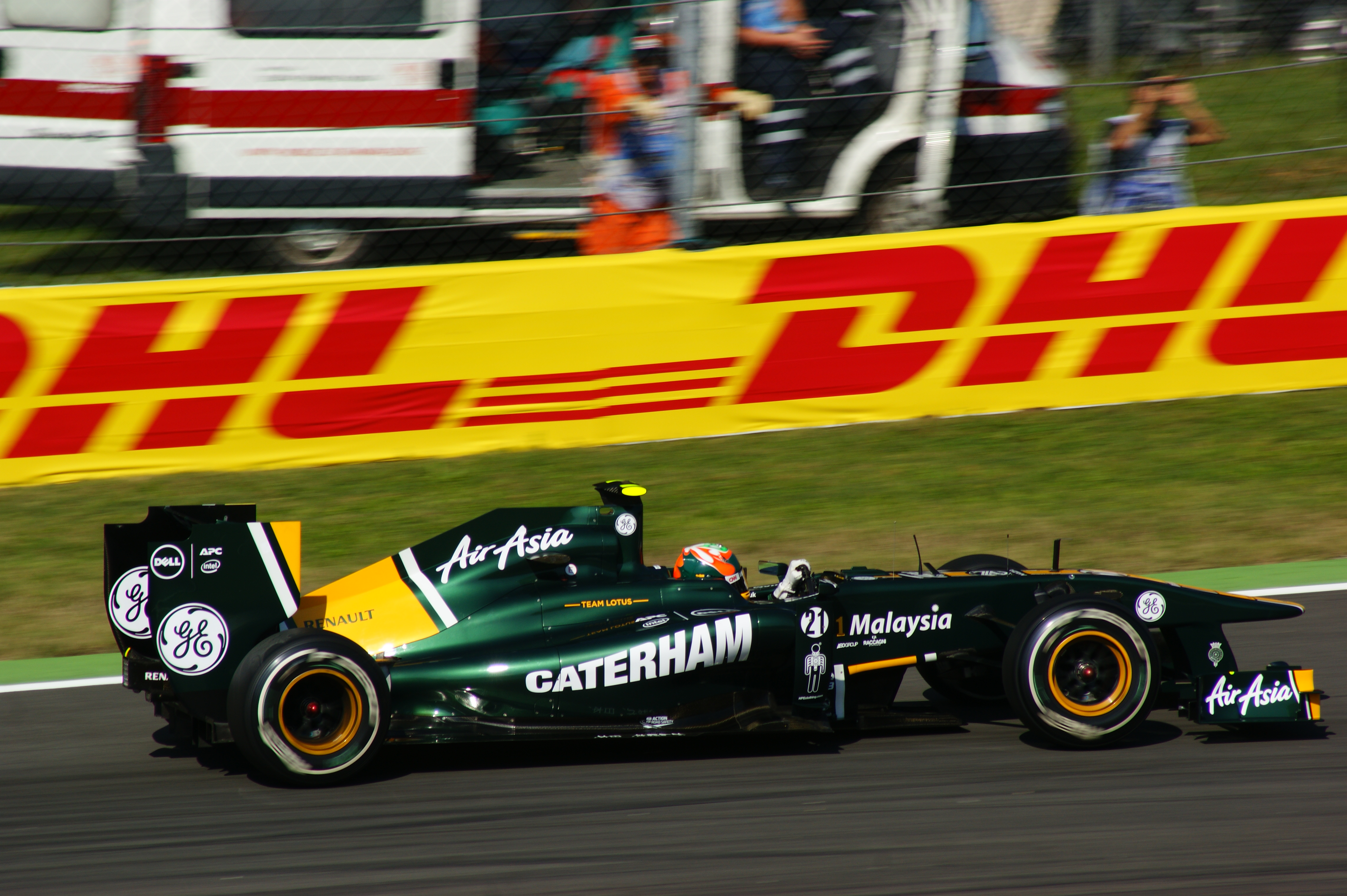
Karun Chandhok drove for Team Lotus in the first free practice session.

Vettel returned to the top of the timing sheets in the second session, just three hundredths of a second faster than Hamilton. However, Hamilton encountered Jaime Alguersuari whilst setting his fastest lap time, denying him the fastest time of the session. Alguersuari himself was impeded by Force India's Adrian Sutil, forcing the Spanish driver to move onto the grassy verge to avoid a collision. His Toro Rosso teammate Sébastien Buemi also left the circuit, crashing as he exited the Parabolica. Several other drivers experienced technical difficulties that limited their running; Daniel Ricciardo was only able to set a lap time three minutes from the end of the session after an electrical fault sidelined him, while Kamui Kobayashi pulled over at the end of the session and Nico Rosberg struggled with an undiagnosed problem in his Mercedes.

Despite setting the fastest lap time in the second session, telemetry data from the speed trap on the main straight demonstrated that Vettel was noticeably slower than his rivals. Vitaly Petrov was the fastest through the speed trap, recording a top speed of 347 km/h (216 mph); by comparison, Vettel was the slowest driver on the circuit, with a top speed of 327.9 km/h (203.7 mph), 19.1 km/h (11.9 mph) slower than Petrov.

The unique twin DRS zones around the circuit provided a challenge for the teams. The Drag Reduction System meant that drivers could run higher downforce settings than they usually would, offering more grip in the corners and unlimited DRS usage in the straights. Such a setup would invariably favour qualifying as the restricted use of DRS in the race could potentially compromise the driver's position. At the same time, a more-traditional setup would favour the race, but at the cost of qualifying position. This unique predicament forced many of the teams to run both setups in Free Practice to make a decision ahead of the race.

=== Qualifying ===
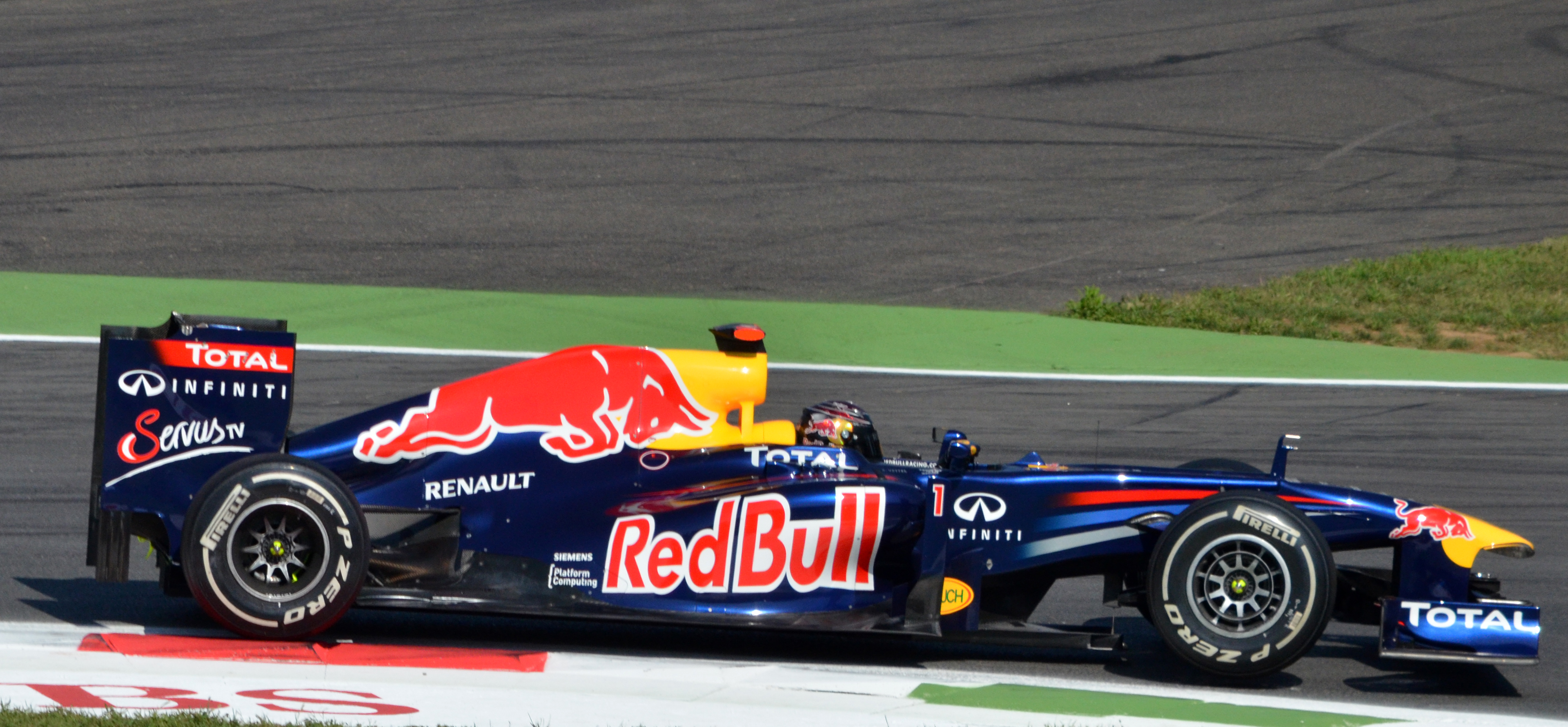
Sebastian Vettel took pole position, at a circuit where Red Bull Racing have never had a front row start before, by half a second from Lewis Hamilton.

Qualifying began in dry conditions at Monza, and the first qualifying period saw Pastor Maldonado crashing to the barriers at Parabolica early on. He was able to pit for a new front wing and return to the circuit, advancing to the second period at the expense of Jaime Alguersuari, who was eliminated alongside the Lotus, Virgin and HRT entries. Daniel Ricciardo out-qualified team mate Vitantonio Liuzzi for the first time, while Timo Glock narrowly bested team mate Jérôme d'Ambrosio, despite problems with his rear wing. Jarno Trulli out-qualified Heikki Kovalainen for just the second time in 2011.

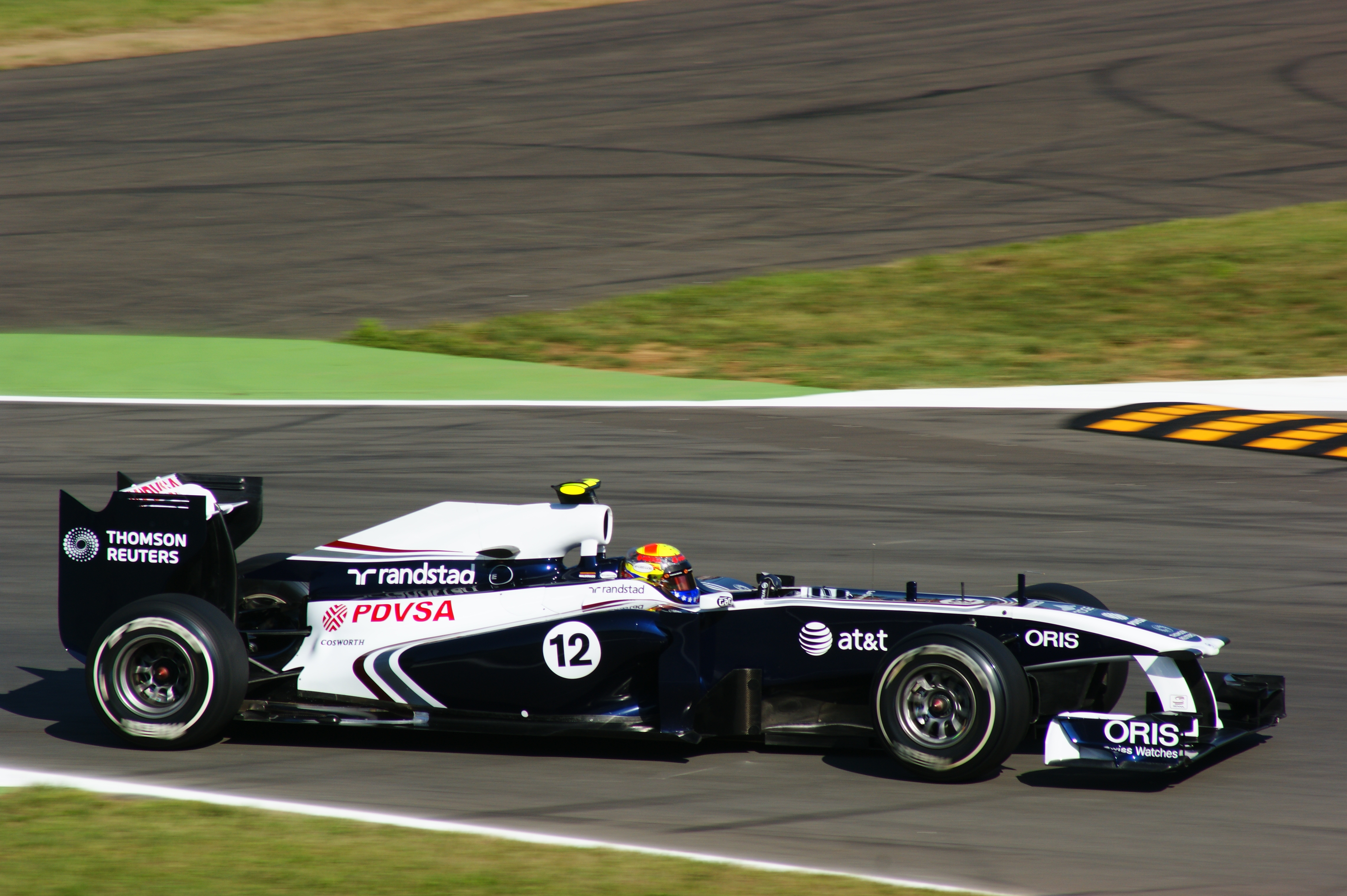
Pastor Maldonado crashed in Q1 breaking the car's nose, but still managed to set a fast enough time to progress to Q2, eventually qualifying fourteenth.

The second qualifying period was marked by the midfield teams attempting to advance to Q3. The Red Bulls, McLarens, Mercedes and Ferraris easily progressed with Vitaly Petrov in ninth, just one thousandth of a second behind Hamilton. Hamilton, who had initially used the prime tyres, returned to the circuit on the options, due to uncertainty of the security of his time, though Petrov remained in his garage. The remaining drivers were all competing for the final spot in Q3. Adrian Sutil briefly held tenth before being passed by Paul di Resta, and di Resta was outqualified in turn by Bruno Senna by a margin of 0.006 seconds. Behind the Force Indias, were the Williamses of Rubens Barrichello and Pastor Maldonado, with Sébastien Buemi sandwiched by the Saubers of Pérez and Kobayashi.

In the final ten-minute part, Ferrari sent both cars out together to give both drivers an opportunity to tow each other to a higher grid spot, though the strategy largely failed. McLaren followed with their second runs being more crucial; Hamilton made a mistake at the Variante Roggia, which caused Michael Schumacher to slow down. Jenson Button pitted after a mistake in the Parabolica, but qualified third behind Hamilton, by five hundredths of a second. There was a larger margin to Vettel though, who was half a second faster than Hamilton. It was Vettel's tenth pole of the season – joining Ayrton Senna as the only other driver to have taken ten pole positions in two separate seasons – and the 25th of his career. Alonso, Webber, Massa, Petrov, Schumacher, Rosberg and Senna – who did not set a lap time in the session – completed the first five rows of the grid.

=== Race ===
Fernando Alonso was the first driver into the first corner, having made the best start off the line from fourth. However, his lead was short-lived; further down the field, Vitantonio Liuzzi made contact with Heikki Kovalainen and slid off across the grass and directly into Vitaly Petrov and Nico Rosberg. The three cars retired on the spot, while Rubens Barrichello was stuck in between the retirees’ cars undamaged, but was forced to wait until they were cleared, ruining his race. The safety car was deployed as the debris was cleared up, and when racing resumed, Sebastian Vettel quickly claimed the lead from Alonso. Vettel would remain unchallenged for the rest of the race, claiming his eighteenth victory. Meanwhile, Jérôme d'Ambrosio retired on the first lap with a gearbox problem.

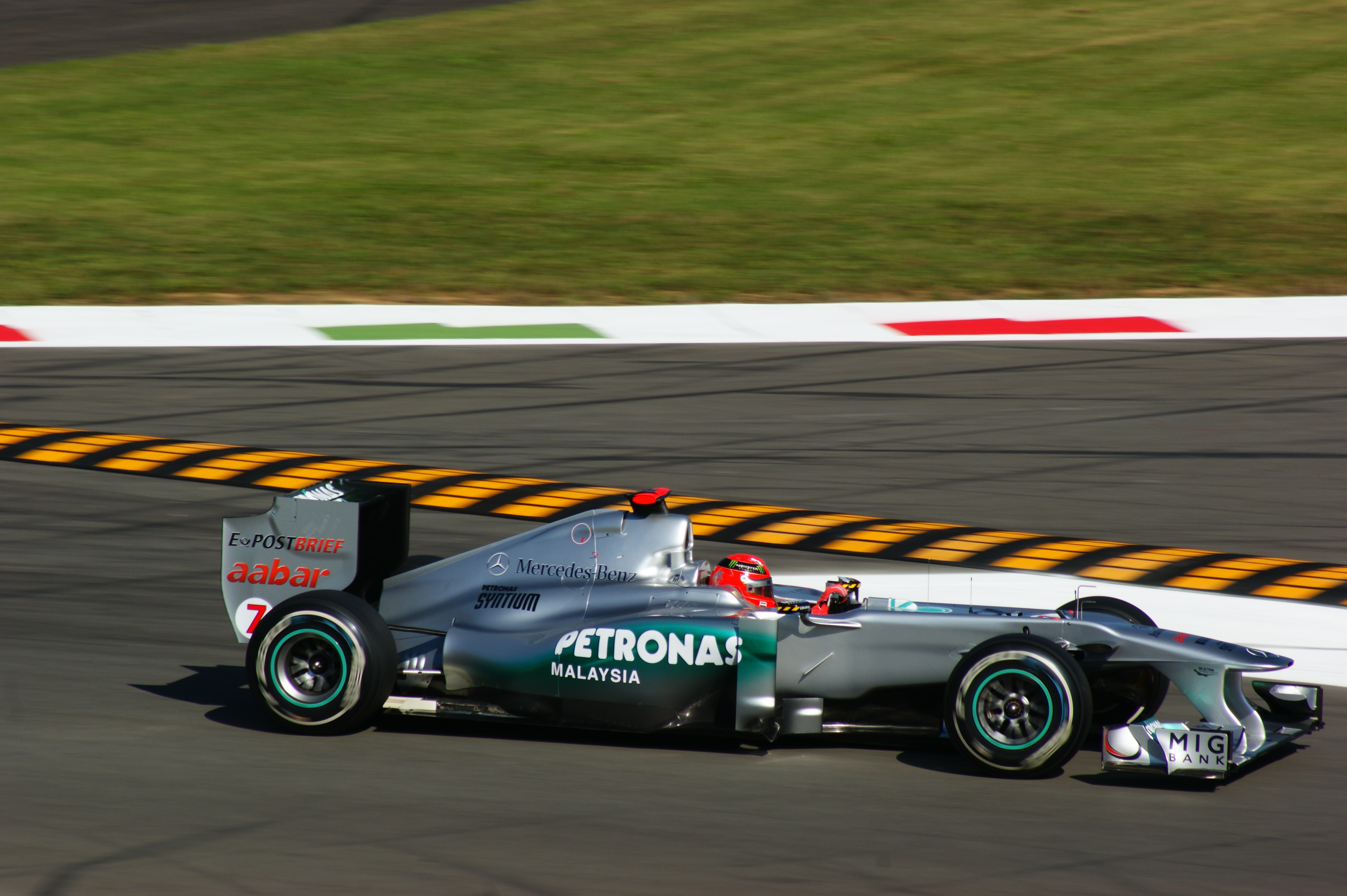
Michael Schumacher finished fifth, having held Lewis Hamilton behind him for the majority of the race.

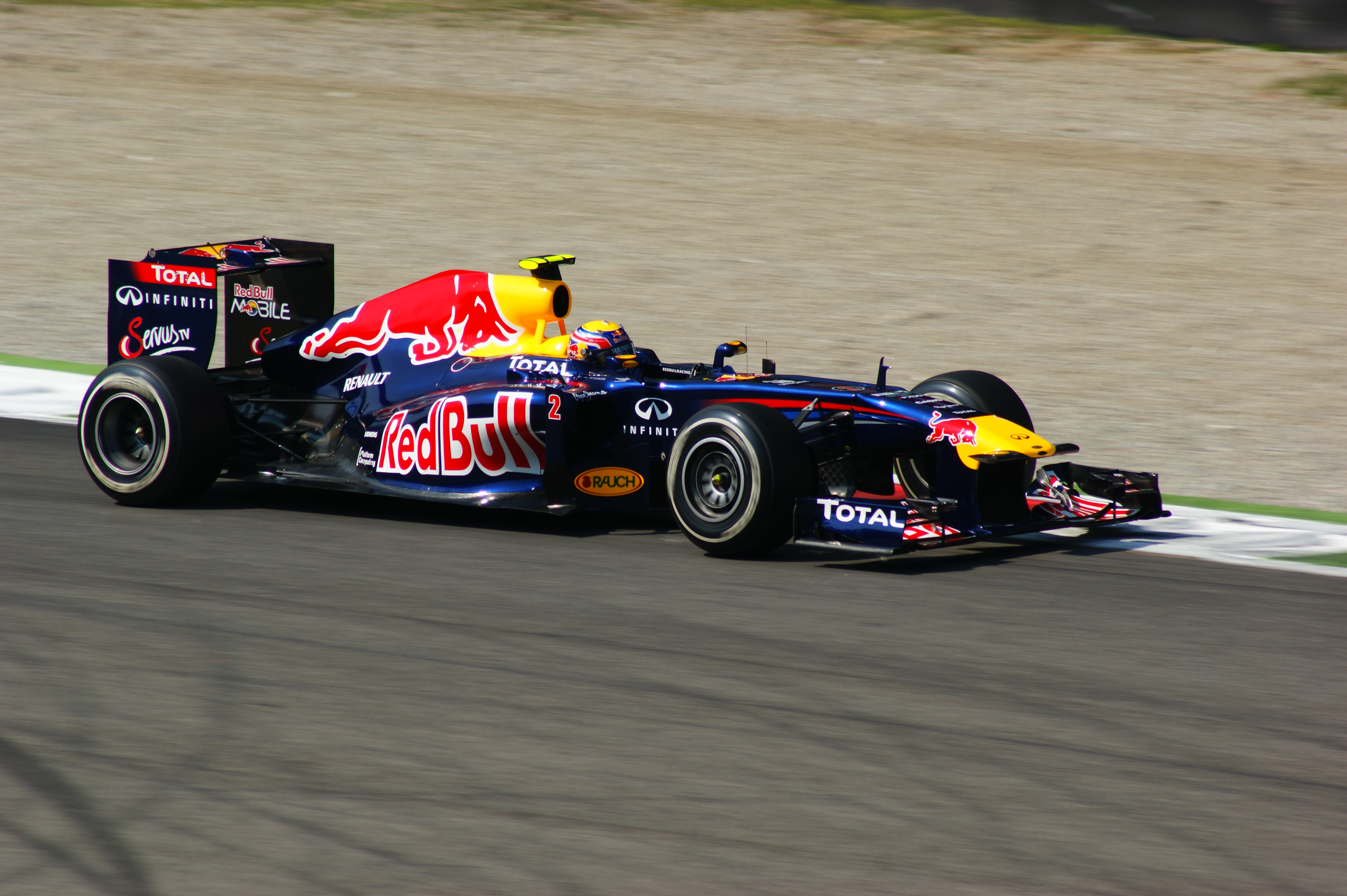
Mark Webber suffered Red Bull's first retirement of 2011 when he attempted to take his car back to the pits following a collision with Felipe Massa.

Further down the grid, Lewis Hamilton was caught unawares by the restart and was quickly passed by Michael Schumacher, whilst Mark Webber challenged Felipe Massa for sixth place going into the first chicane. The two made contact and Massa was spun around, but was able to continue racing; for his part, Webber tried to limp back to the pits with a broken front wing, but crashed out at the Parabolica, recording Red Bull Racing's first retirement of the season. Adrian Sutil joined the growing list of retirements several laps later with hydraulic problems, pulling his Force India VJM04 over at the Ascari chicane.

As Vettel and Alonso increased their leads, Hamilton began to threaten Schumacher for third. Schumacher was warned over the radio several times for blocking by team principal Ross Brawn; Schumacher was taking a defensive line going into the Ascari chicane before cutting back over to the racing line. The battle with Hamilton slowed both drivers down enough that fifth-placed Jenson Button could catch up to them, and things came to a head when Schumacher cut Hamilton off at the Curva Grande and forcing him onto the grass on the inside of the corner. As Hamilton backed off, Button was able to pass him. Where Hamilton's fight with Schumacher would last thirty laps, Button passed the Mercedes driver on his first attempt, leaving him free to pursue Alonso. Hamilton claimed fourth from Schumacher when the German made his first scheduled stop.

The Sauber C30s of Kamui Kobayashi and seventh-placed Sergio Pérez retired with near-identical gearbox problems, reducing the field to just fifteen drivers plus Daniel Ricciardo. Ricciardo's car had gone into anti-stall on the grid before failing to engage a gear. The car was immediately returned to the pits while repairs were carried out, and although Ricciardo returned to the circuit, he was some eight laps behind the last-placed Timo Glock at the time of Pérez's retirement. Ricciardo would ultimately finish the race fourteen laps behind race winner Vettel, and was therefore not classified as a finisher as he had failed to complete 90% of the winner's race distance. With just fifteen drivers on the track, the Team Lotus drivers of Heikki Kovalainen and Jarno Trulli were able to secure 13th and 14th place, further reinforcing the team's claim to tenth in the World Constructors' Championship.

Vettel went on to win the race by 9.5 seconds from Jenson Button, who had caught and passed Alonso with less than ten laps to go. Once freed from behind Schumacher's Mercedes, Lewis Hamilton started catching Alonso at a rate that meant the 2008 World Champion would only be able to pass his former teammate on the last lap. Ultimately, it was not to be; Alonso completed the podium, crossing the finish line half a second ahead of Hamilton. Jenson Button scored his third consecutive second-place finish and fourth podium at Monza. After finishing fifth in Belgium, Schumacher repeated his performance with another fifth place, in front of Massa, whose race had largely been ruined by the early contact with Webber. Jaime Alguersuari scored a career-best finish with seventh place, ahead of Paul di Resta. The four points di Resta earned for eighth place, plus the double retirement of the Saubers helped elevate Force India to sixth in the constructors' standings. Bruno Senna scored his first World Championship points in ninth place, whilst Sébastien Buemi claimed the final World Championship point.

=== Post-race ===
Vettel's win extended his World Championship lead to 112 points ahead of Alonso, who took advantage of Webber's retirement to move into second overall. Vettel's result meant that a win in Singapore would be enough to secure his second World Drivers' Championship and become the sport's youngest double World Champion, provided Alonso does not finish second or third, and neither Button nor Webber finishes second. Button's second place moved him up to third overall in the points standings, though Hamilton's result was not enough to surpass the retired Webber, leaving him fifth overall and the last driver with a mathematical possibility of winning the championship, though several drivers conceded that they would not be able to beat Sebastian Vettel.

For causing the first corner incident, Vitantonio Liuzzi was given a five-place grid penalty for the Singapore Grand Prix.

== Classification ==
=== Qualifying ===
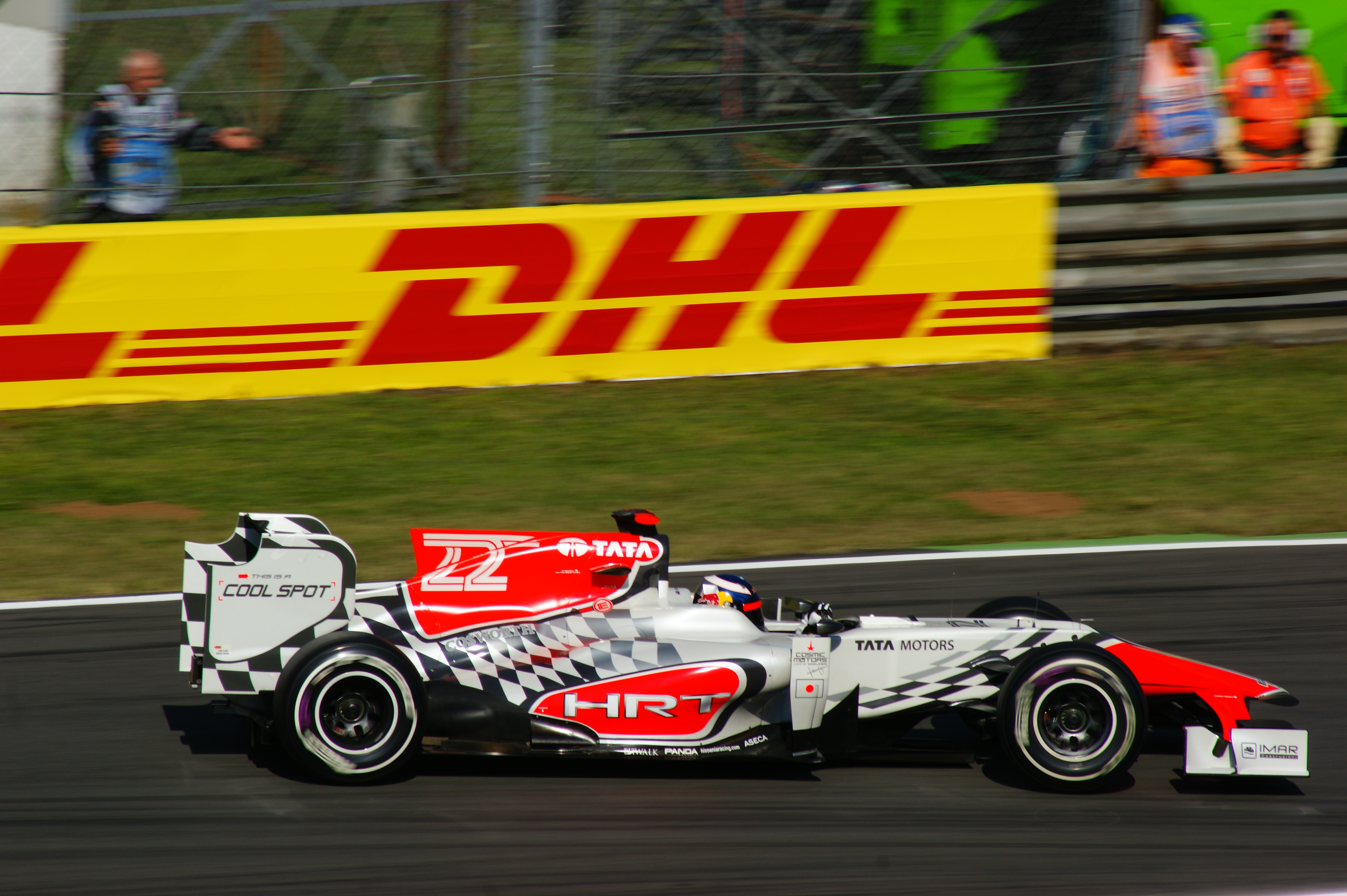
Daniel Ricciardo outqualified HRT teammate Vitantonio Liuzzi for the first time.

Pos	No	Driver	Constructor	Part 1	Part 2	Part 3	Grid
1	1	(Germany) Sebastian Vettel	Red Bull Racing-Renault	1:24.002	1:22.914	1:22.275	1
2	3	(United Kingdom) Lewis Hamilton	McLaren-Mercedes	1:23.976	1:23.172	1:22.725	2
3	4	(United Kingdom) Jenson Button	McLaren-Mercedes	1:24.013	1:23.031	1:22.777	3
4	5	(Spain) Fernando Alonso	Ferrari	1:24.134	1:23.342	1:22.841	4
5	2	(Australia) Mark Webber	Red Bull Racing-Renault	1:24.148	1:23.387	1:22.972	5
6	6	(Brazil) Felipe Massa	Ferrari	1:24.523	1:23.681	1:23.188	6
7	10	(Russia) Vitaly Petrov	Renault	1:24.486	1:23.741	1:23.530	7
8	7	(Germany) Michael Schumacher	Mercedes	1:25.108	1:23.671	1:23.777	8
9	8	(Germany) Nico Rosberg	Mercedes	1:24.550	1:23.335	1:24.477	9
10	9	(Brazil) Bruno Senna	Renault	1:24.914	1:24.157	no time	10
11	15	(United Kingdom) Paul di Resta	Force India-Mercedes	1:24.574	1:24.163		11
12	14	(Germany) Adrian Sutil	Force India-Mercedes	1:24.595	1:24.209		12
13	11	(Brazil) Rubens Barrichello	Williams-Cosworth	1:24.975	1:24.648		13
14	12	(Venezuela) Pastor Maldonado	Williams-Cosworth	1:24.798	1:24.726		14
15	17	(Mexico) Sergio Pérez	Sauber-Ferrari	1:25.113	1:24.845		15
16	18	(Switzerland) Sébastien Buemi	Toro Rosso-Ferrari	1:25.164	1:24.932		16
17	16	(Japan) Kamui Kobayashi	Sauber-Ferrari	1:24.879	1:25.065		17
18	19	(Spain) Jaime Alguersuari	Toro Rosso-Ferrari	1:25.334			18
19	21	(Italy) Jarno Trulli	Lotus-Renault	1:26.647			19
20	20	(Finland) Heikki Kovalainen	Lotus-Renault	1:27.184			20
21	24	(Germany) Timo Glock	Virgin-Cosworth	1:27.591			21
22	25	(Belgium) Jérôme d'Ambrosio	Virgin-Cosworth	1:27.609			22
23	22	(Australia) Daniel Ricciardo	HRT-Cosworth	1:28.054			23
24	23	(Italy) Vitantonio Liuzzi	HRT-Cosworth	1:28.231			24
107% time: 1:29.854

=== Race ===
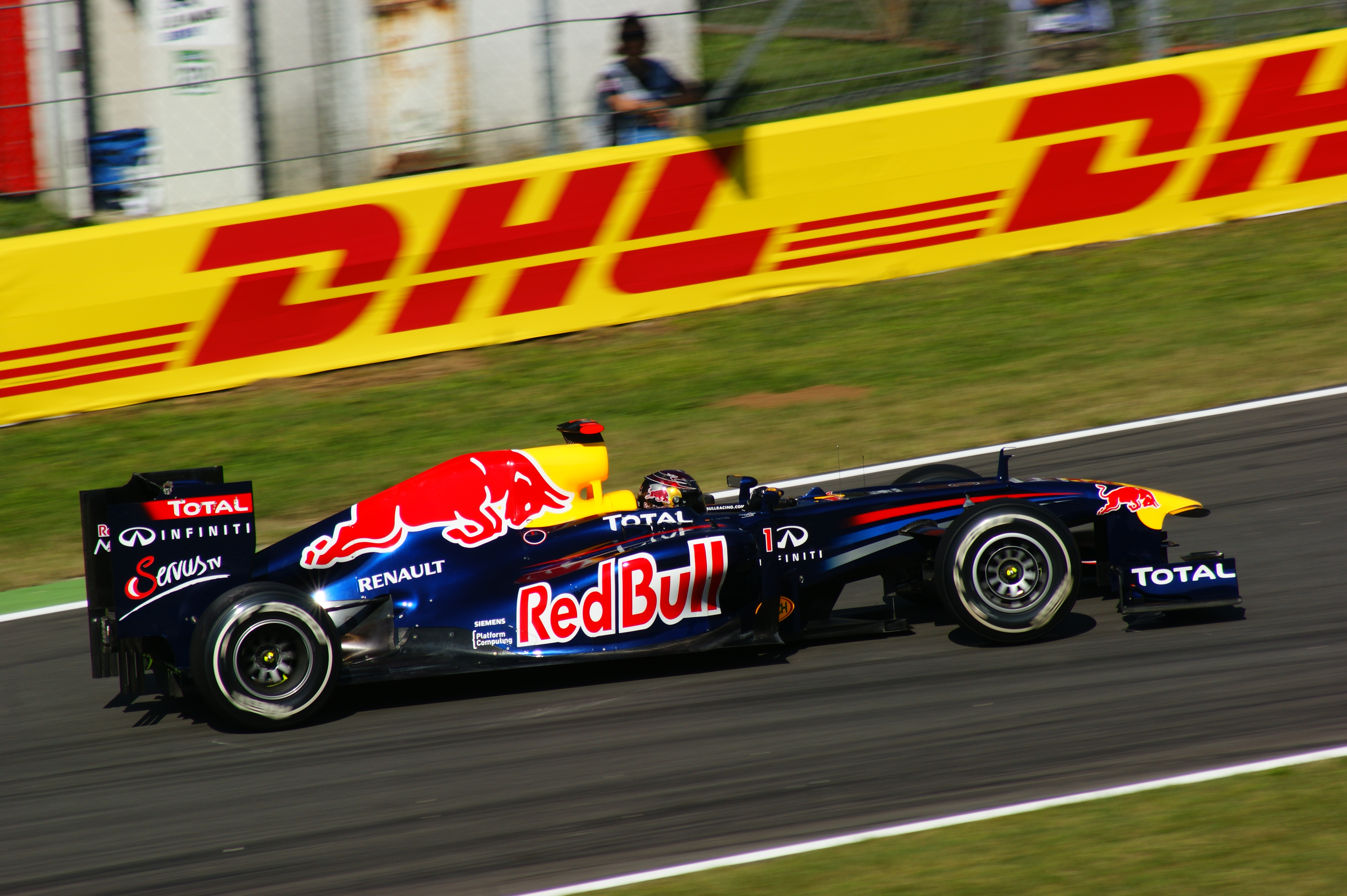
Sebastian Vettel won the Italian Grand Prix for the second time, after his win in 2008.

Pos	No	Driver	Constructor	Laps	Time/Retired	Grid	Points
1	1	(Germany) Sebastian Vettel	Red Bull Racing-Renault	53	1:20:46.172	1	25
2	4	(United Kingdom) Jenson Button	McLaren-Mercedes	53	+9.590	3	18
3	5	(Spain) Fernando Alonso	Ferrari	53	+16.909	4	15
4	3	(United Kingdom) Lewis Hamilton	McLaren-Mercedes	53	+17.417	2	12
5	7	(Germany) Michael Schumacher	Mercedes	53	+32.677	8	10
6	6	(Brazil) Felipe Massa	Ferrari	53	+42.993	6	8
7	19	(Spain) Jaime Alguersuari	Toro Rosso-Ferrari	52	+1 Lap	18	6
8	15	(United Kingdom) Paul di Resta	Force India-Mercedes	52	+1 Lap	11	4
9	9	(Brazil) Bruno Senna	Renault	52	+1 Lap	10	2
10	18	(Switzerland) Sébastien Buemi	Toro Rosso-Ferrari	52	+1 Lap	16	1
11	12	(Venezuela) Pastor Maldonado	Williams-Cosworth	52	+1 Lap	14	
12	11	(Brazil) Rubens Barrichello	Williams-Cosworth	52	+1 Lap	13	
13	20	(Finland) Heikki Kovalainen	Lotus-Renault	51	+2 Laps	20	
14	21	(Italy) Jarno Trulli	Lotus-Renault	51	+2 Laps	19	
15	24	(Germany) Timo Glock	Virgin-Cosworth	51	+2 Laps	21	
NC	22	(Australia) Daniel Ricciardo	HRT-Cosworth	39	+14 Laps^{1}	23	
Ret	17	(Mexico) Sergio Pérez	Sauber-Ferrari	32	Gearbox	15	
Ret	16	(Japan) Kamui Kobayashi	Sauber-Ferrari	21	Gearbox	17	
Ret	14	(Germany) Adrian Sutil	Force India-Mercedes	9	Hydraulics	12	
Ret	2	(Australia) Mark Webber	Red Bull Racing-Renault	4	Collision damage/Accident	5	
Ret	25	(Belgium) Jérôme d'Ambrosio	Virgin-Cosworth	1	Gearbox	22	
Ret	10	(Russia) Vitaly Petrov	Renault	0	Collision	7	
Ret	8	(Germany) Nico Rosberg	Mercedes	0	Collision	9	
Ret	23	(Italy) Vitantonio Liuzzi	HRT-Cosworth	0	Collision	24	

Note:

1. – Daniel Ricciardo was not classified as he completed less than 90% of the winner's race distance.

== Championship standings after the race ==
Drivers' Championship standings

	Pos.	Driver	Points
	1	(Germany) Sebastian Vettel	284
1	2	(Spain) Fernando Alonso	172
1	3	(United Kingdom) Jenson Button	167
2	4	(Australia) Mark Webber	167
	5	(United Kingdom) Lewis Hamilton	158

Constructors' Championship standings

Pos.	Constructor	Points
1	(Austria) Red Bull Racing-Renault	451
2	(United Kingdom) McLaren-Mercedes	325
3	(Italy) Ferrari	254
4	(Germany) Mercedes	108
5	(United Kingdom) Renault	70

- Note: Only the top five positions are included for both sets of standings.

== See also ==
- 2011 Monza GP2 Series round
- 2011 Monza GP3 Series round

Previous race: 2011 Belgian Grand Prix	FIA Formula One World Championship; 2011 season	Next race: 2011 Singapore Grand Prix
Previous race: 2010 Italian Grand Prix	Italian Grand Prix	Next race: 2012 Italian Grand Prix
