= Paul Hembery =

British engineer (born 1966)

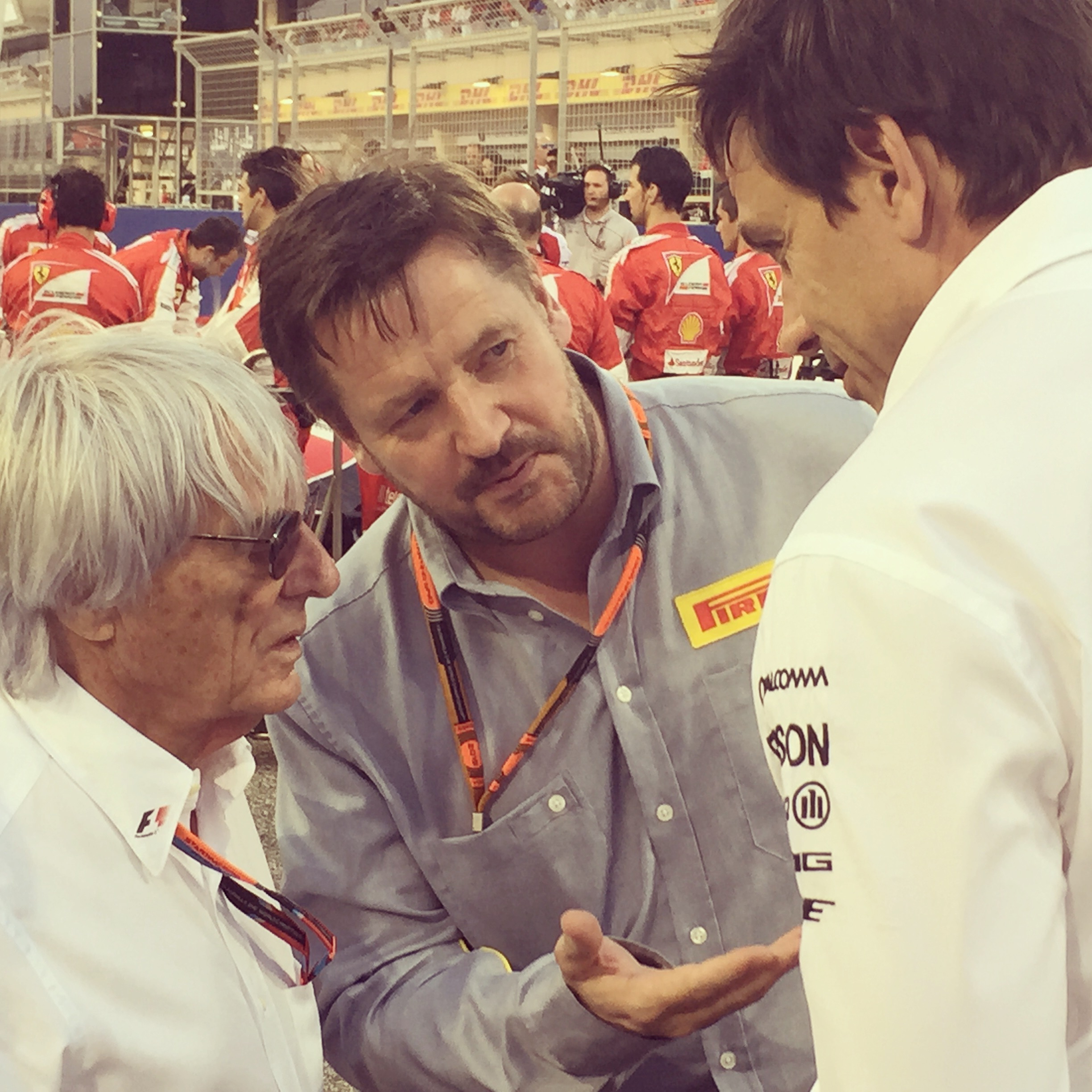
- Born: 21 March 1966; Yeovil, Somerset, England
- Occupation: Motorsport director

Paul Hembery (born 21 March 1966) is a British engineer the former Motorsport Director and then Latin America Executive Director of Pirelli. He was first employed in the tyre industry in research and development, later becoming involved in commercial work. Hembery has also worked as a CEO of Pirelli Asia Pacific and has been involved in the World Rally Championship and Formula One racing series.

== Biography ==
Hembery was born in Yeovil. His first job was working in the tyre industry for 20 years, working in research and development and later working in a commercial role. He was first employed by Pirelli in 1992. Hembery has worked as the CEO of Pirelli Asia Pacific and currently works in the supply of controlling tyres in the World Rally Championship and Grand-Am Rolex Sports Car Series since 2008 and has also become involved in Pirelli's operation in Formula One since the company supplied tyres to F1 teams at the start of the 2011 season. From 15 March 2017, Hembery became president of Pirelli LatAM but continued to maintain overall supervision of Pirelli's motor racing activities. Hembery left Pirelli in December 2019 and took up employment with various businesses across the United Kingdom and the United States. He also founded the ULU holistic brand that sells a range of Cannabidiol products.

== Personal life ==
His wife comes from California.
