= Richard Frith (engineer) =

British Formula One engineer

- Occupation: Engineer
- Employer: Williams Racing
- Known for: Formula One engineer
- Title: Head of Performance Systems

Richard Frith is a British Formula One engineer. He is currently the head of performance systems for the Williams Racing Formula One team.

== Career ==
Frith studied aerospace engineering at Kingston University. He began his engineering career in 1996 as a Technical Support Engineer at Servotest Testing Systems Ltd., working on test and motion simulation systems. In 1998, he joined the Jordan Grand Prix Formula One team later known as a vehicle dynamicist. He stayed with the Silverstone based team for twelve years, eventually rising to become head of vehicle dynamics.

In 2010, Frith moved to the Sauber F1 Team as Head of Vertical Dynamics in Zurich, focusing on suspension behaviour and vertical performance characteristics. He joined Marussia F1 in 2012 as Head of Vehicle Performance, leading vehicle performance activities during the team’s participation in Formula One.

Frith then joined McLaren Racing in 2014 as Project Leader for Vehicle Performance, working on vehicle attribute setting, performance optimisation and powertrain drivability. In 2015, he was promoted to Head of Vehicle Performance Application, where he led simulation support for design and trackside operations across ride, handling and steering, as well as overseeing simulator operations and vehicle performance event support teams.

In 2021, Frith joined the Mercedes-EQ Formula E Team as Head of the Vehicle Dynamics Group. During his tenure, the team won the FIA Formula E World Championship in both 2021 and 2022. He moved to the Alpine F1 Team in 2022 as Head of the Vehicle Performance Group, and was appointed Head of Performance in 2024, overseeing the team’s performance systems organisation, including vehicle performance, controls, simulation, race strategy and power unit performance integration.

In January 2025, Frith joined Williams Racing as Head of Performance Systems, where he leads the team’s performance group encompassing race engineering, strategy, tyre performance, performance engineering and performance optimisation.
