= Simon Phillips (engineer) =

British engineer

- Occupation: Aerodynamicist
- Years active: 1996–2022
- Known for: Formula One aerodynamicist

Simon Phillips is a British Formula One aerodynamicist. He was most notably the head of aerodynamics across the Silverstone based team, now known as Aston Martin Formula One Team.

== Career ==
Phillips studied Aeronautical Engineering at the University of Bath. He began his engineering career in 1991 as an Aerodynamics Engineer at Airbus, working in the Filton wind tunnel on aerodynamic development programmes. In 1996, he transitioned into Formula One by joining Jordan Grand Prix as a CFD Engineer, where he worked on computational fluid dynamics modelling and aerodynamic simulation.

He was promoted to Head of CFD in 1999, overseeing the team’s CFD operations and aerodynamic development processes. In 2004, Phillips became Senior Aerodynamicist, before being appointed Head of Aerodynamics later that year. In this role, he led aerodynamic design and development through multiple ownership and branding changes, including Midland F1 Racing, Spyker F1, and Force India, remaining in charge of the aerodynamic department from 2004 to 2018.

Following the team’s rebranding as Racing Point F1 Team in 2018, Phillips was appointed Director of Aerodynamic Operations and Software, overseeing aerodynamic development processes alongside software and simulation systems. In late 2020, he was promoted to Engineering & Business Systems Director, a role he continued after the team’s transition into Aston Martin Formula One Team in 2021, before departing in 2022.
