= 2011 Singapore Grand Prix =

Race 14 of 19 in the 2011 Formula One World Championship
← Previous race	Next race →
- Marina Bay Street Circuit

Race details
- Date: 25 September 2011
- Official name: 2011 Formula 1 SingTel Singapore Grand Prix
- Location: Marina Bay Street Circuit; Marina Bay, Singapore
- Course: Street circuit
- Course length: 5.073 km (3.153 miles)
- Distance: 61 laps, 309.087 km (192.058 miles)
- Weather: Hot and humid Air Temp 31 °C (88 °F)
- Attendance: 247,500 (3-Day Total); 82,500 (3-Day Average)

Pole position
Driver	(Germany) Sebastian Vettel	Red Bull Racing-Renault
- Time: 1:44.381

Fastest lap
Driver	(United Kingdom) Jenson Button	McLaren-Mercedes
- Time: 1:48.454 on lap 54

Podium
First	(Germany) Sebastian Vettel	Red Bull Racing-Renault
Second	(United Kingdom) Jenson Button	McLaren-Mercedes
Third	(Australia) Mark Webber	Red Bull Racing-Renault

The 2011 Singapore Grand Prix, formally the 2011 Formula 1 SingTel Singapore Grand Prix, was a Formula One motor race that was held on 25 September 2011 at the Marina Bay Street Circuit in Singapore. It was the fourteenth round of the 2011 Formula One season and the twelfth time the Singapore Grand Prix had been held. The 61-lap race was won by Red Bull Racing's Sebastian Vettel, the Drivers' Championship leader, after starting from pole position. Jenson Button finished in second place for McLaren, and Mark Webber completed the podium in third position.

As a consequence of the race, Vettel extended his lead in the World Drivers' Championship to 124 points over Button, who moved up to second place in the championship. Fernando Alonso and Webber, third and fourth in the championship, were eliminated from championship contention. In the World Constructors' Championship, Red Bull extended their championship lead over McLaren to 138 points, with Ferrari a further 85 points behind in third position, and no longer in a position to win the championship title.

== Report ==
=== Background ===
The build-up to the race was marked by accusations that Red Bull Racing had violated the Resource Restriction Agreement in 2010, accusations that the team denied. The RRA is an agreement between members of the Formula One Teams Association designed to cut costs within the sport. The agreement outlines the teams' projected budgets – including both financial and non-financial elements, such as the amount of time spent using a wind tunnel – for upcoming seasons and limits them to using only as much as they had agreed upon. Following an audit from a Dutch consultancy firm, it was reported that Red Bull had violated the RRA when other teams – including McLaren, Ferrari, Mercedes and Sauber – had passed the inspection.

Vitantonio Liuzzi was handed a five-place grid penalty for the race for causing an accident on the first lap of the Italian Grand Prix. His HRT team added a tribute to Christian Bakkerud onto their cars after Bakkerud, who raced in the 24 Hours of Le Mans twice for HRT principal Colin Kolles' team, died in a road accident on 11 September. McLaren driver Lewis Hamilton also paid tribute to Bakkerud and Martin Hines by wearing a helmet that read "R.I.P M.H. & C.B.".

Scuderia Toro Rosso inadvertently broke one of its curfews when team principal Franz Tost arrived at the circuit "too early". Because the Singapore Grand Prix is a night race, it starts at 10pm local time instead of 2pm as the European races do, meaning that the timetable of events is different for the duration of the Grand Prix weekend. The curfew period is officially defined as the nine hours before the first practice session, and therefore takes up daylight hours at Singapore instead of the early-morning hours in Europe. As Tost entered the circuit before the curfew had expired, the team were considered to have used up one of the four waivers to the curfew that all teams were allocated for 2011. Red Bull Racing, Mercedes and Virgin all fell afoul of the different timetable on the Saturday morning. All three teams later had their curfew exemptions restored after they demonstrated that the early staff members who originally broke the curfew were not involved with working on their cars.

Tyre supplier Pirelli brought its yellow-banded soft compound tyre as the harder "prime" tyre and the red-banded super-soft compound as the softer "option" compound, as opposed to the previous year where Bridgestone brought the medium compound as the prime.

A single DRS (Drag Reduction System) Zone was used in the race. The detection point was located at turn 4 with the DRS activation point 35m after the turn 5 apex. This resulted in plenty of passing into the turn 7 braking zone.

The race marked the 50th Grand Prix of Sébastien Buemi, who made his debut at the 2009 Australian Grand Prix, and was Sebastian Vettel's 50th race for Red Bull Racing.

=== Free Practice ===
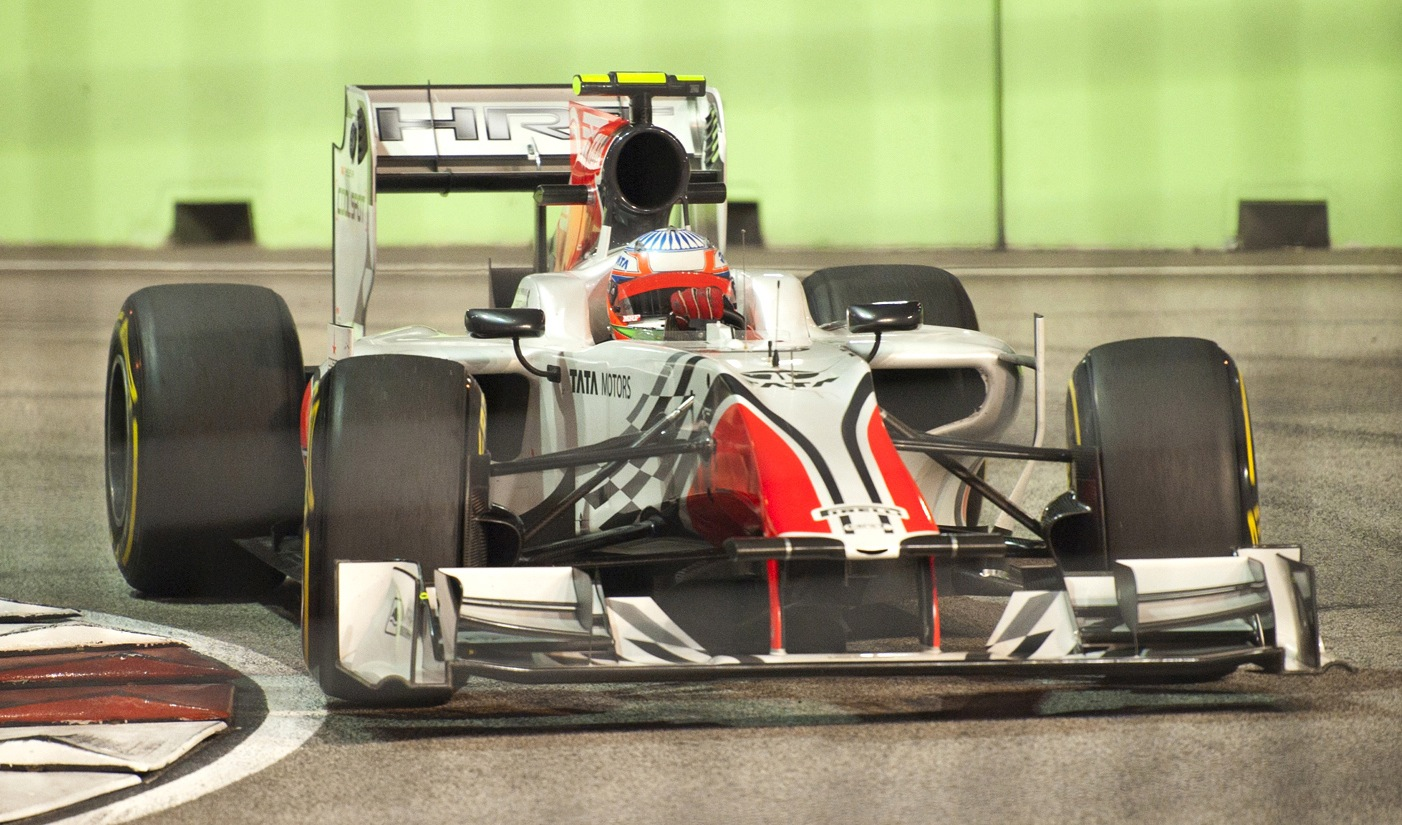
Narain Karthikeyan drove in the first free practice session for HRT.

The first practice session was delayed by half an hour to allow for circuit repairs to take place. Competitors in the Porsche Carrera Cup Asia support races dislodged plastic kerbing on Republic Boulevard and Esplanade Drive, forcing the Grand Prix practice session to be delayed while the offending parts were removed and the circuit deemed safe. When the circuit was re-opened, the practice session was shortened to one hour instead of the prescribed ninety minutes. Lewis Hamilton finished the session fastest, four hundredths of a second faster than Sebastian Vettel, who was a second faster than his teammate Mark Webber. Webber had previously had an on-track encounter with Timo Glock that destroyed his front wing and gave Glock a puncture, which ended his session. The session was interrupted several minutes later when Heikki Kovalainen's Lotus T128 caught fire in almost exactly the same place that his car caught alight in 2010. The session was stopped while Kovalainen's car was retrieved, and restarted, only to be stopped again ten minutes from the end of the hour. Felipe Massa had hit a kerb, dislodging it and exposing the bolt that was supposed to secure it in place. The session restarted with three minutes remaining, before the circuit was repaired ahead of the second practice session. Fernando Alonso was fourth, followed by Jenson Button and Massa. Narain Karthikeyan drove the HRT for the first time since Valencia in this session, in preparation for his drive at his home race in India. He finished the session 24th and last, one tenth slower than teammate Daniel Ricciardo.

Repairs to the circuit were carried out before the start of the second practice session with kerbing at Turn 13 removed. When the lights went green, the Lotus mechanics were still trying to rebuild Kovalainen's car. Jenson Button's session ended prematurely when he locked his brakes and stopped just before the wall at Turn 14, and was unable to restart the car; however, the time he had recorded until then was fast enough to be tenth overall at the end of the session. Sébastien Buemi's session was also ended early, when he collided with the barriers at Turn 21, going too fast through the corner and damaging his suspension. Teammate Jaime Alguersuari also had little running before a mechanical problem ended his session, while Paul di Resta's session was also shortened after a hydraulic brakes issue limited him to eight laps in the session. Vitaly Petrov had been scheduled to run upgraded bodywork parts on his Renault R31, but the team discovered the car overheated, and were forced to abandon the new parts until Suzuka. Vettel set the quickest time in the session, two tenths quicker than Alonso, with Hamilton, Massa, Webber and Michael Schumacher completing the top six.

Circuit repairs took place overnight in an effort to improve the kerbing and prevent the race weekend from being further disrupted. The kerbs at Turn 3 and Turn 7 were removed entirely, and replaced with painted markings, with the drivers to be briefed on what would be considered an acceptable racing line through the affected corners. The kerb at the entry to Turn 14 was likewise removed, but with no further plans to replace it, while efforts were made to secure the kerbs at Turn 13 and the "Singapore Sling" chicane. The FIA was unwilling to commit to one definitive plan, instead opting to reassess the situation once the initial work had been completed and again after the third practice session. The drivers expressed indifference towards the changes, with Felipe Massa commenting that "it's not a big change having or not having it", though he did point out that several drivers felt the kerbs at Turn 13 were unnecessary and that the FIA should consider the kerbs at Turn 5, which had previously gone unattended.

=== Qualifying ===
Qualifying was marked by a distinct spread across the grid, with several teams reproducing similar times between their drivers, comfortably separated from other teams. Sebastian Vettel was fastest in the first period, half a second clear of Jenson Button. As the session drew on, it became clear that several teams were in danger of being eliminated. Vitaly Petrov spent most of the session in 18th, and improved on his final run, but teammate Bruno Senna was faster and relegated Petrov on his final lap. Petrov blamed a small error for compromising his run, briefly losing control of the back end of the car just enough to change his tyre pressures and costing him the tenth of a second he would have needed to advance to Q2. Senna claimed he had been impeded by Jaime Alguersuari on his flying lap, but the incident was not investigated. Heikki Kovalainen qualified ahead of Jarno Trulli, followed by the Virgins of Timo Glock and Jérôme d'Ambrosio and the Hispanias of Daniel Ricciardo out-qualifying Vitantonio Liuzzi for the second race in succession. Liuzzi received a penalty for causing a collision on the first lap of the Italian Grand Prix two weeks previously, but made no effect to his grid position of 24th.

The second session was red-flagged when Kamui Kobayashi crashed at the Turn 10 chicane. Missing the first apex, his Sauber C30 was launched into the air by the kerb on the second apex, throwing him into the barriers. Qualifying was halted while the car was retrieved and debris from the crash cleared away. Kobayashi's crash meant that he would fail to set a lap time and would start from seventeenth on the grid. When the session was restarted, Vettel once again led the way. Lewis Hamilton attempted a second flying lap during the session, but was forced to pit almost straight away when he picked up a puncture in his right-rear tyre. Under the sporting regulations, Hamilton would not be allowed to replace the damaged set of tyres with a fresh one, thereby depriving him of a set of option tyres for the race. Kobayashi's teammate Sergio Pérez was briefly inside the top ten and able to advance to Q3, but was knocked out at the last moment by Paul di Resta; the Mexican driver qualified eleventh ahead of the Williams pair of Rubens Barrichello and Pastor Maldonado. Sébastien Buemi and Jaime Alguersuari were fourteenth and sixteenth for Scuderia Toro Rosso, split by the lone Renault of Bruno Senna. Although, this made it the first time since the 2010 Canadian Grand Prix that both Force Indias had made it into Q3.

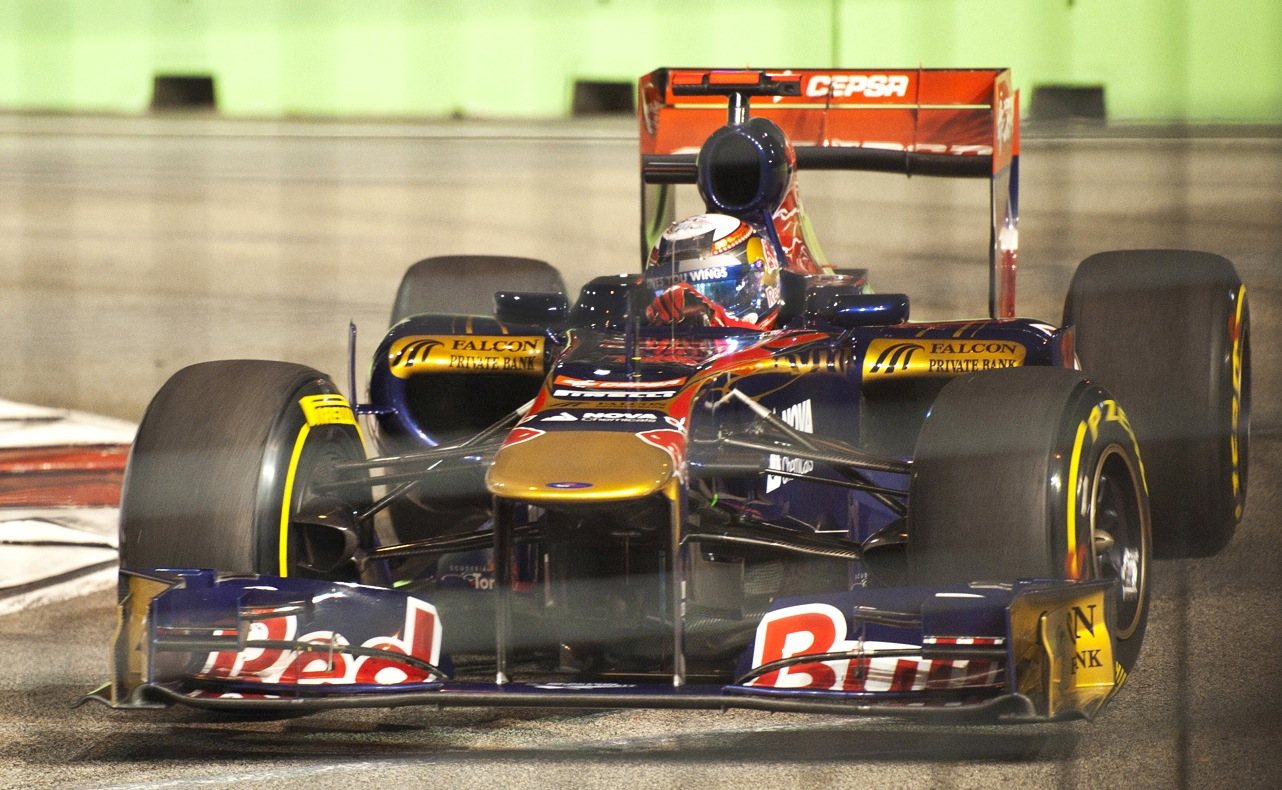
Sébastien Buemi qualified 14th.

The third session began with four drivers queueing at the end of pit lane, an unusual sight in Formula One, as they would all be running in the dirty air generated by the cars in front. However, with a full lap of the Marina Bay circuit taking almost two minutes to complete, the drivers would have to race to get back to the pits on their in-lap if they intended to make a second run. Jenson Button led Fernando Alonso, Felipe Massa and Hamilton out of the pits. Hamilton later faced criticism for an aggressive move on Felipe Massa at Turn 19 on the out-lap; Massa later slowed down to let Hamilton through, compromising his flying lap as speed carried into the final corner would translate into a faster lap time. Massa questioned why Hamilton felt the need for such an aggressive move as opposed to slowing on his out-lap to allow for clear running. Force India also received criticism when both their drivers again elected to stay in the pits rather than set a flying lap; Mercedes' Michael Schumacher followed a similar approach, but did leave the pits in order to line up ahead of them.

Sebastian Vettel, who had waited in pit for the queue of cars to clear, once again rose to provisional pole. Jenson Button was second until Hamilton and Mark Webber claimed second in succession. Button took third from Hamilton with his second flying lap, but Hamilton was held in the pits with a fuel problem long enough that he would not have enough time to navigate the circuit and get back to the start line before the chequered flag fell, and he had to settle for fourth. Alonso and Massa were fifth and sixth, with Nico Rosberg the final car to set a lap time in seventh. Vettel attempted to set a second lap time, but made a mistake and aborted the lap; however, his original time was still fast enough for pole position, his eleventh of the season. The end result meant that the Red Bull Racing cars occupied the first row of the grid, the McLarens the second, with both Ferraris on the third row, Mercedes completing the fourth and the Force Indias the fifth row.

=== Race ===
At the start, Vettel kept his lead into the first corner, while teammate Webber fell to fourth. Hamilton tried to take Webber after a good start for third place, but had to back out and fell to seventh. Button and Alonso's good starts put them into second and third in the race. There was contact between Massa and Rosberg at Turn 1 forcing Rosberg to run straight across Turn 2 and filter in just behind Webber; he conceded the place back to Massa later in the lap. Ricciardo also made contact, forcing him to pit for a new front wing. Hamilton had caught Schumacher on lap 4, repassing him on the run to Turn 7, before passing Rosberg for sixth on the next lap. On Lap 10, Glock crashed at the final turn, and retired with rear suspension damage; whilst on the same lap Webber dived down Alonso's outside into Turn 14, Alonso then ran a bit wide allowing Webber to come down the outside again and take the position from him with a bold move at Turn 16. Alonso pitted on the next lap, switching from the option to the prime tyres. Meanwhile, Hamilton and Massa both pitted on lap 12, Ferrari winning the pit stop battle and with Massa staying in fifth place, and Alonso emerging at Turn 1 just in front of the pair, despite being held up by Barrichello. Alonso would also move back ahead of Webber, when Webber made his pit stop.

Hamilton attacked immediately on the out lap and made contact with Massa at turn 7. When Hamilton tried to go around the outside of the corner, he turned in clipping his front wing on Massa's tyre, causing both drivers – Massa with a right rear puncture, dropping him down to nineteenth, and Hamilton for a new front wing – to pit again. Hamilton was later given a drive through penalty for causing an avoidable collision. Behind Vettel and Button, di Resta had moved into third, after running a different strategy to the majority of his rivals. He kept this place until lap 19, when he conceded it to Alonso at Turn 7. He pitted not long after this, and fell to eighth behind teammate Sutil. Webber closed up behind Alonso and was half a second behind by lap 25, before Alonso pitted for the second time. Rosberg ran wide at the final corner on lap 29, which allowed Pérez and Schumacher to close up on Rosberg. Pérez took the defensive line for Turn 7, and Schumacher attempted to go around the outside. Pérez held the racing line, and Schumacher ran into the back of him, scattering debris across the track. Schumacher later described the incident as a racing incident, and that he had not expected Pérez to brake as early as he did. Schumacher retired while Pérez continued on relatively unscathed. The safety car was deployed while the debris was cleared, with many drivers electing to make pit stops, and as a result Vettel's lead of more than 20 seconds was wiped out.

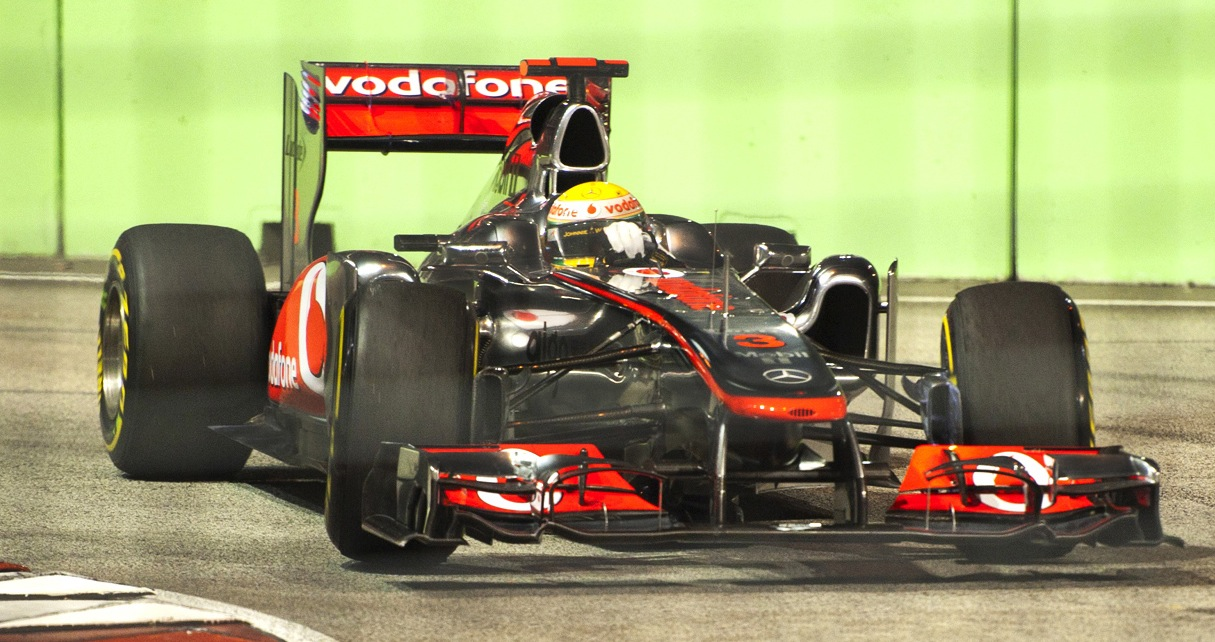
Lewis Hamilton was involved in an incident with Felipe Massa, disadvantaging both of their races.

At the restart, Vettel immediately pulled out a 4-second lead over second placed Button, who was stuck behind a train of backmarkers led by Jarno Trulli. Trulli was lapped by Kobayashi at Turn 1 while Button attempted to get past them. Webber passed Alonso down the inside into the "Singapore Sling" chicane, later describing the manoeuvre as spectacular. Martin Brundle also described the overtake, as "opportunistic". Even despite this overtake, Webber was already five seconds behind Button. Meanwhile, Hamilton began his recovery following his drive through penalty, and was up to sixth place on lap 38, before passing di Resta the following lap. Kobayashi was later given a drive-through penalty for ignoring blue flags, when Button had been stuck behind for over a lap earlier in the race. Trulli retired with a gearbox failure on lap 46. Webber pitted and changed to the option tyre on lap 48, and was temporarily overtaken by Hamilton. Button pitted the next lap and changed to another set of option tyres. This allowed Vettel to cover Button, and he pitted the next lap. As he exited the pits, the Lotus of Heikki Kovalainen was released into his path but he drove past Kovalainen in the pit lane exit. Alonso also made his stop on the same lap as Vettel, leaving him behind Webber this time.

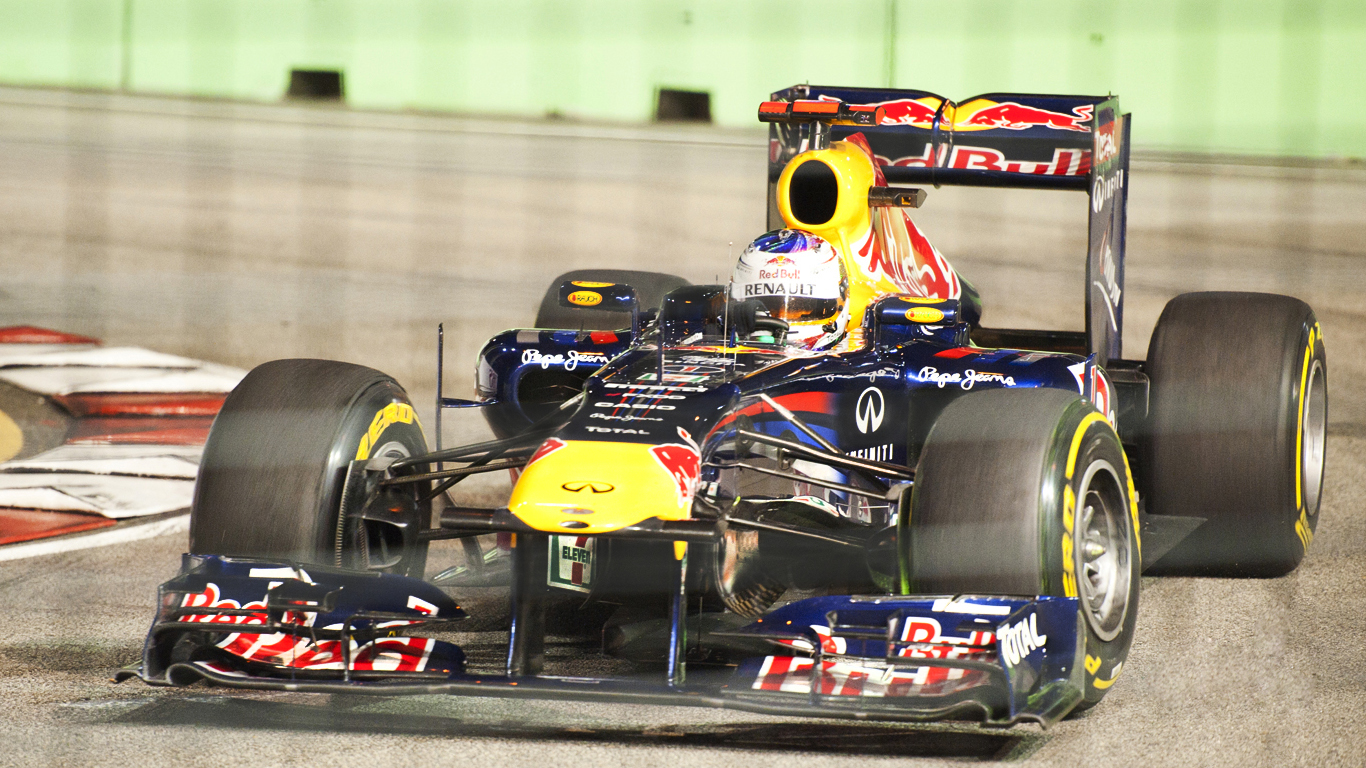
Sebastian Vettel took his ninth victory of the season by 1.7 seconds from Jenson Button, and nearly half a minute in front of teammate Mark Webber.

With seven laps to go, Hamilton passed di Resta once again for fifth place, as teammate Button set the race's fastest lap. Massa also managed to get back into the points after his clash with Hamilton, as he passed Barrichello and Pérez to move into ninth. McLaren were still trying to pressure Vettel, and Button closed the gap to under four seconds by the time Vettel had cleared lapped traffic. Unfortunately for him, Button also had to clear this traffic, and just like Vettel, lost around two seconds behind the Williams cars. Alguersuari crashed at turn 18 on the penultimate lap, ending his day, but classified in 21st. Vettel was caught behind the Massa-Pérez scrap for ninth on the final lap as Button backed out of his fight for victory. Massa missed the chance to take eighth from Sutil by having to let Vettel through. Thus, Vettel took his third successive victory, leading from lights-to-flag for the first time since the 2010 European Grand Prix. He was followed over the line by Button, who was only 1.7 seconds behind by the end of the race, and took his fourth podium in a row. Webber completed the podium followed by Alonso and Hamilton. Di Resta scored his best finish in Formula One with sixth place, ahead of Rosberg, Sutil, Massa and Pérez, who rounded out the points.

=== Post-race ===
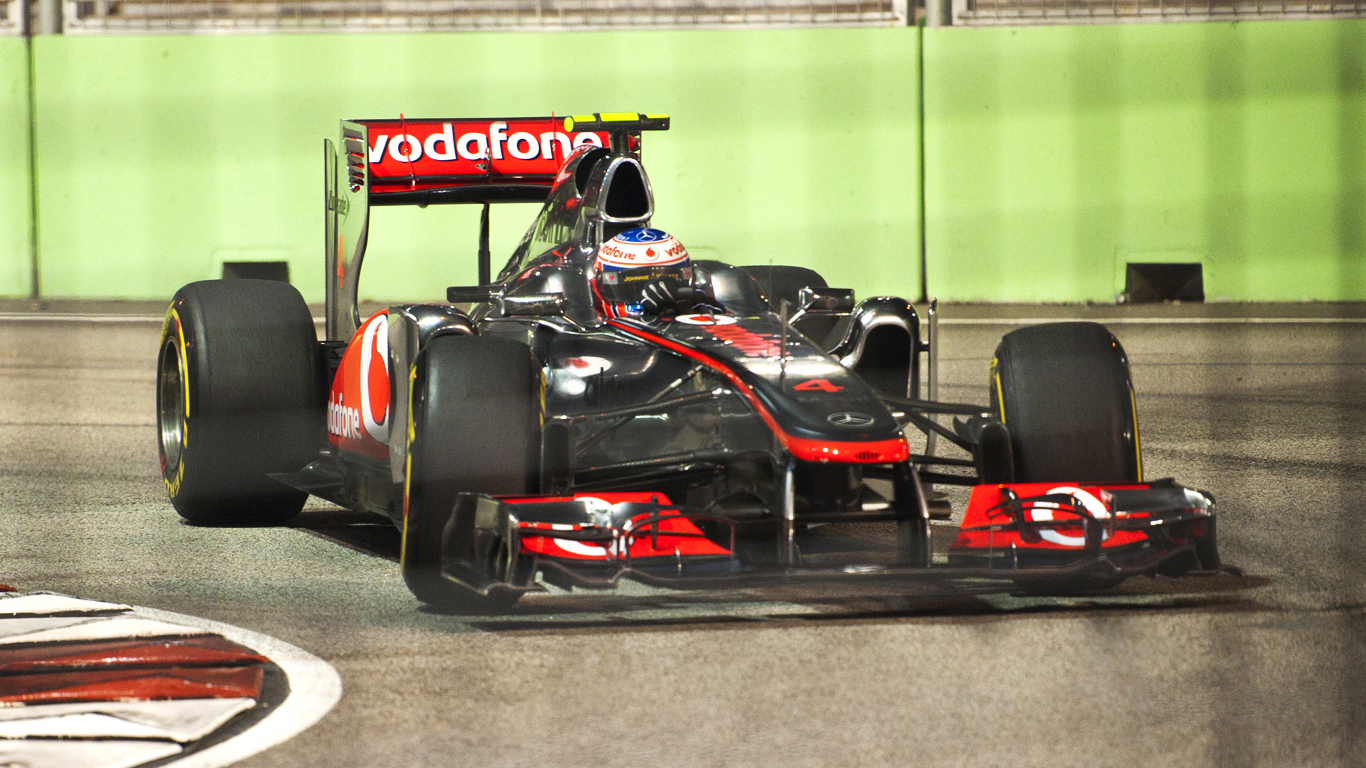
Jenson Button left Singapore as the only driver with a theoretical chance of beating Sebastian Vettel to the title

The result of the race meant that Vettel had not already won his second World Championship; but, with Hamilton failing to beat Vettel, Alonso failing to stand on the podium, and Webber failing to finish second, all three of these drivers were eliminated from Championship contention. Button became the only man who could stop Vettel now, finishing second in the race and moving up to second place in the Drivers' Championship. He was 124 points behind Vettel, with only 125 points still available, which meant that even if Button won all of the remaining races, Vettel needed just one tenth place to retain his world title.

This result also meant it was possible for Red Bull Racing to clinch their second successive Constructors' world title in Japan, by scoring 34 points more than McLaren.

Massa expressed frustration with Hamilton, publicly criticising him after the race. He was already annoyed at Hamilton, following an incident in qualifying where Hamilton lunged down Massa's inside, attempting to pass on an out-lap. Massa also went up to Hamilton in the post-race TV interview area as he was about to start an interview with RTL Television, patted his shoulder, and sarcastically said: "Good job, bro."

== Classification ==
=== Qualifying ===
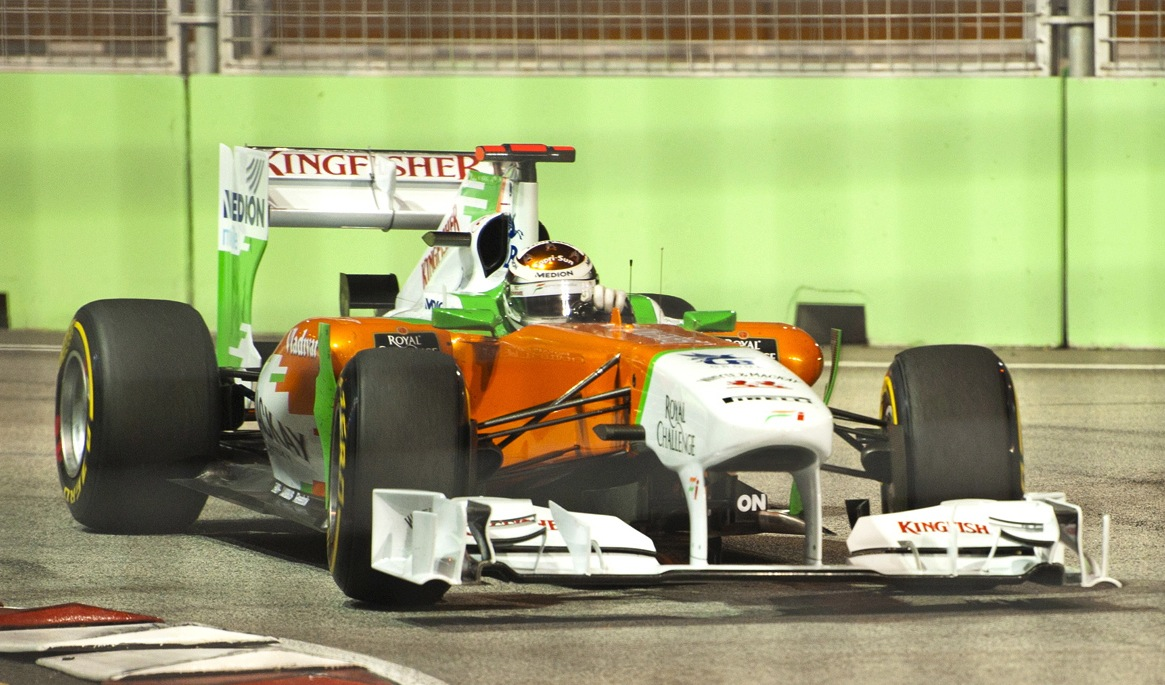
Adrian Sutil qualified in ninth position for the Force India team.

Pos	No	Driver	Constructor	Part 1	Part 2	Part 3	Grid
1	1	(Germany) Sebastian Vettel	Red Bull Racing-Renault	1:46.397	1:44.931	1:44.381	1
2	2	(Australia) Mark Webber	Red Bull Racing-Renault	1:47.332	1:45.651	1:44.732	2
3	4	(United Kingdom) Jenson Button	McLaren-Mercedes	1:46.956	1:45.472	1:44.804	3
4	3	(United Kingdom) Lewis Hamilton	McLaren-Mercedes	1:47.014	1:46.829	1:44.809	4
5	5	(Spain) Fernando Alonso	Ferrari	1:47.054	1:45.779	1:44.874	5
6	6	(Brazil) Felipe Massa	Ferrari	1:47.945	1:45.955	1:45.800	6
7	8	(Germany) Nico Rosberg	Mercedes	1:47.688	1:46.405	1:46.013	7
8	7	(Germany) Michael Schumacher	Mercedes	1:48.819	1:46.043	no time^{1}	8
9	14	(Germany) Adrian Sutil	Force India-Mercedes	1:47.952	1:47.093	no time^{1}	9
10	15	(United Kingdom) Paul di Resta	Force India-Mercedes	1:48.022	1:47.486	no time^{1}	10
11	17	(Mexico) Sergio Pérez	Sauber-Ferrari	1:47.717	1:47.616		11
12	11	(Brazil) Rubens Barrichello	Williams-Cosworth	1:48.061	1:48.082		12
13	12	(Venezuela) Pastor Maldonado	Williams-Cosworth	1:49.710	1:48.270		13
14	18	(Switzerland) Sébastien Buemi	Toro Rosso-Ferrari	1:48.753	1:48.634		14
15	9	(Brazil) Bruno Senna	Renault	1:48.861	1:48.662		15
16	19	(Spain) Jaime Alguersuari	Toro Rosso-Ferrari	1:49.588	1:49.862		16
17	16	(Japan) Kamui Kobayashi	Sauber-Ferrari	1:48.054	no time^{2}		17
18	10	(Russia) Vitaly Petrov	Renault	1:49.835			18
19	20	(Finland) Heikki Kovalainen	Lotus-Renault	1:50.948			19
20	21	(Italy) Jarno Trulli	Lotus-Renault	1:51.012			20
21	24	(Germany) Timo Glock	Virgin-Cosworth	1:52.154			21
22	25	(Belgium) Jérôme d'Ambrosio	Virgin-Cosworth	1:52.363			22
23	22	(Australia) Daniel Ricciardo	HRT-Cosworth	1:52.404			23
24	23	(Italy) Vitantonio Liuzzi	HRT-Cosworth	1:52.810			24^{3}
107% time: 1:53.844

Notes:

^1 – Adrian Sutil and Paul di Resta elected not to take to the circuit in Q3, while Michael Schumacher only drove an out-lap, so they did not set a lap time.
^2 – Kamui Kobayashi crashed on his out-lap in Q2, and so failed to set a lap time.
^3 – Vitantonio Liuzzi was given a five-place grid penalty for causing the first-corner accident at the Italian Grand Prix, although ultimately it had no effect as he qualified last anyway.

=== Race ===
Pos	No	Driver	Constructor	Laps	Time/Retired	Grid	Points
1	1	(Germany) Sebastian Vettel	Red Bull Racing-Renault	61	1:59:06.757	1	25
2	4	(United Kingdom) Jenson Button	McLaren-Mercedes	61	+1.737	3	18
3	2	(Australia) Mark Webber	Red Bull Racing-Renault	61	+29.279	2	15
4	5	(Spain) Fernando Alonso	Ferrari	61	+55.449	5	12
5	3	(United Kingdom) Lewis Hamilton	McLaren-Mercedes	61	+1:07.766	4	10
6	15	(United Kingdom) Paul di Resta	Force India-Mercedes	61	+1:51.067	10	8
7	8	(Germany) Nico Rosberg	Mercedes	60	+1 Lap	7	6
8	14	(Germany) Adrian Sutil	Force India-Mercedes	60	+1 Lap	9	4
9	6	(Brazil) Felipe Massa	Ferrari	60	+1 Lap	6	2
10	17	(Mexico) Sergio Pérez	Sauber-Ferrari	60	+1 Lap	11	1
11	12	(Venezuela) Pastor Maldonado	Williams-Cosworth	60	+1 Lap	13	
12	18	(Switzerland) Sébastien Buemi	Toro Rosso-Ferrari	60	+1 Lap	14	
13	11	(Brazil) Rubens Barrichello	Williams-Cosworth	60	+1 Lap	12	
14	16	(Japan) Kamui Kobayashi	Sauber-Ferrari	59	+2 Laps	17	
15	9	(Brazil) Bruno Senna	Renault	59	+2 Laps	15	
16	20	(Finland) Heikki Kovalainen	Lotus-Renault	59	+2 Laps	19	
17	10	(Russia) Vitaly Petrov	Renault	59	+2 Laps	18	
18	25	(Belgium) Jérôme d'Ambrosio	Virgin-Cosworth	59	+2 Laps	22	
19	22	(Australia) Daniel Ricciardo	HRT-Cosworth	57	+4 Laps	23	
20	23	(Italy) Vitantonio Liuzzi	HRT-Cosworth	57	+4 Laps	24	
21	19	(Spain) Jaime Alguersuari	Toro Rosso-Ferrari	56	Accident^{4}	16	
Ret	21	(Italy) Jarno Trulli	Lotus-Renault	47	Gearbox	20	
Ret	7	(Germany) Michael Schumacher	Mercedes	28	Collision	8	
Ret	24	(Germany) Timo Glock	Virgin-Cosworth	9	Accident	21	

Notes:

^4 – Jaime Alguersuari crashed on lap 57 of the race, but was classified as he had completed over 90% of the winner's race distance.

== Championship standings after the race ==
Drivers' Championship standings

	Pos.	Driver	Points
	1	(Germany) Sebastian Vettel*	309
1	2	(United Kingdom) Jenson Button*	185
1	3	(Spain) Fernando Alonso	184
	4	(Australia) Mark Webber	182
	5	(United Kingdom) Lewis Hamilton	168

Constructors' Championship standings

Pos.	Constructor	Points
1	(Austria) Red Bull Racing-Renault*	491
2	(United Kingdom) McLaren-Mercedes*	353
3	(Italy) Ferrari*	268
4	(Germany) Mercedes	114
5	(United Kingdom) Renault	70

- Note: Only the top five positions are included for both sets of standings.
- Bold text and an asterisk indicates whose who still had a theoretical chance of becoming World Champion.

Previous race: 2011 Italian Grand Prix	FIA Formula One World Championship; 2011 season	Next race: 2011 Japanese Grand Prix
Previous race: 2010 Singapore Grand Prix	Singapore Grand Prix	Next race: 2012 Singapore Grand Prix
