= 2011 Japanese Grand Prix =

Race 15 of 19 in the 2011 Formula One World Championship
← Previous race	Next race →

Race details
- Date: 9 October 2011
- Official name: 2011 Formula 1 Japanese Grand Prix
- Location: Suzuka Circuit, Suzuka, Mie, Japan
- Course: Permanent racing facility
- Course length: 5.807 km (3.608 miles)
- Distance: 53 laps, 307.471 km (191.054 miles)
- Weather: Sunny and dry Air Temp 24 °C (75 °F)
- Attendance: 199,000

Pole position
Driver	(Germany) Sebastian Vettel	Red Bull Racing-Renault
- Time: 1:30.466

Fastest lap
Driver	(United Kingdom) Jenson Button	McLaren-Mercedes
- Time: 1:36.568 on lap 52

Podium
First	(United Kingdom) Jenson Button	McLaren-Mercedes
Second	(Spain) Fernando Alonso	Ferrari
Third	(Germany) Sebastian Vettel	Red Bull Racing-Renault

The 2011 Japanese Grand Prix (officially the 2011 Formula 1 Japanese Grand Prix) was a Formula One motor race that was held on 9 October 2011 at the Suzuka Circuit in Suzuka, Japan. It was the fifteenth round of the 2011 Formula One season and the 37th time the Japanese Grand Prix had been held. The 53-lap race was won by McLaren's Jenson Button, after he started from second on the grid. Fernando Alonso finished in second place for Scuderia Ferrari, and Sebastian Vettel completed the podium, with third, for Red Bull Racing.

Vettel had started the race in pole position alongside Button, whom he had marginally outqualified. The two drivers were the only two within mathematical contention for the title. Button attempted to overtake Vettel at the start of the race, yet was pressured towards the grass by Vettel which resulted in him losing his second position to third-placed starter Lewis Hamilton. Vettel was passed by Button in the second pit-stop phase, and was then passed by Alonso in the third. Hamilton slipped back from second to fifth, predominantly in the pit-stops; debris from a collision between himself and Felipe Massa caused a safety car period in the race. The second Red Bull of Mark Webber finished in fourth position.

As a consequence of the race, Vettel secured the World Drivers' Championship for the second year in succession, having only required one point prior to the weekend to be declared World Champion. Button remained in second place on the standings after his victory, extending the gap over third-placed Alonso to eight points. In the World Constructors' Championship, Red Bull's championship lead over McLaren was cut to 130 points, with Ferrari a further 96 points behind in third position.

== Report ==
=== Background ===
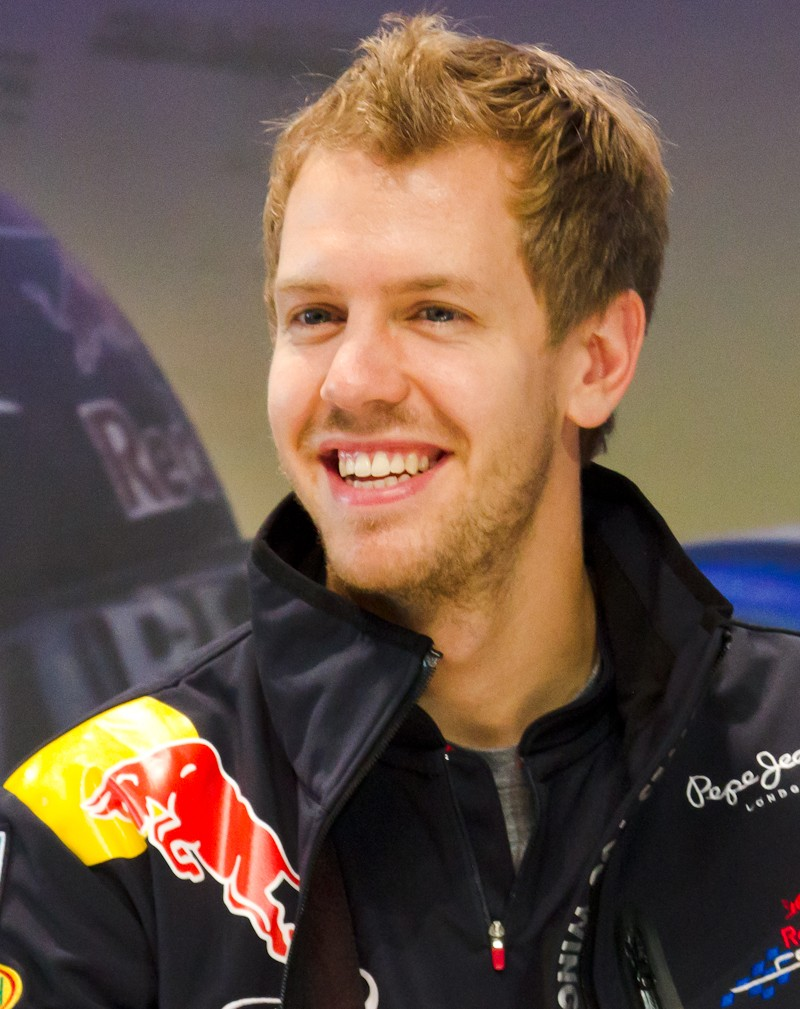
Sebastian Vettel required just a single championship point to secure his second successive world title in Japan.

Sebastian Vettel entered the race knowing that either a points finish or Jenson Button's failure to win, would see him crowned the sport's youngest double World Champion. He led the championship on 309 points, 124 ahead of Button, with only 125 still available. Fernando Alonso and Mark Webber may have been out of the Championship hunt, but were both within 3 points of Button, on 184 and 182 respectively. Lewis Hamilton occupied fifth spot on 168 points. Red Bull led the Constructors' Championship with 491 points, ahead of McLaren on 353, with Ferrari no longer in Championship contention after Singapore.

Prior to the race weekend, it was announced that Button had signed a new multi-year deal with McLaren after recent rumours surrounding his future. Button wore a special helmet for the weekend which featured a design in the style of the Japanese flag; he was to auction the helmet off afterwards to raise money for those caught in unfortunate circumstances during the times of the tsunami earlier that year.

Tyre supplier Pirelli brought its white-banded medium compound tyre as the harder "prime" tyre and the yellow-banded soft compound as the softer "option" compound, as opposed to the previous year where Bridgestone brought the silver-banded hard compound as the prime.

Just like the race in Singapore, a single DRS (Drag Reduction System) Zone was used in the race. The detection point was located at the exit of the high speed turn 15, better known as 130R, while the DRS activation point was 30m after the turn 18. Hence, the DRS was activated from the final turn down the start/finish straight up to turn 1.

1980 World Champion, Alan Jones, was the drivers' representative on the steward's panel for the weekend.

=== Practice ===
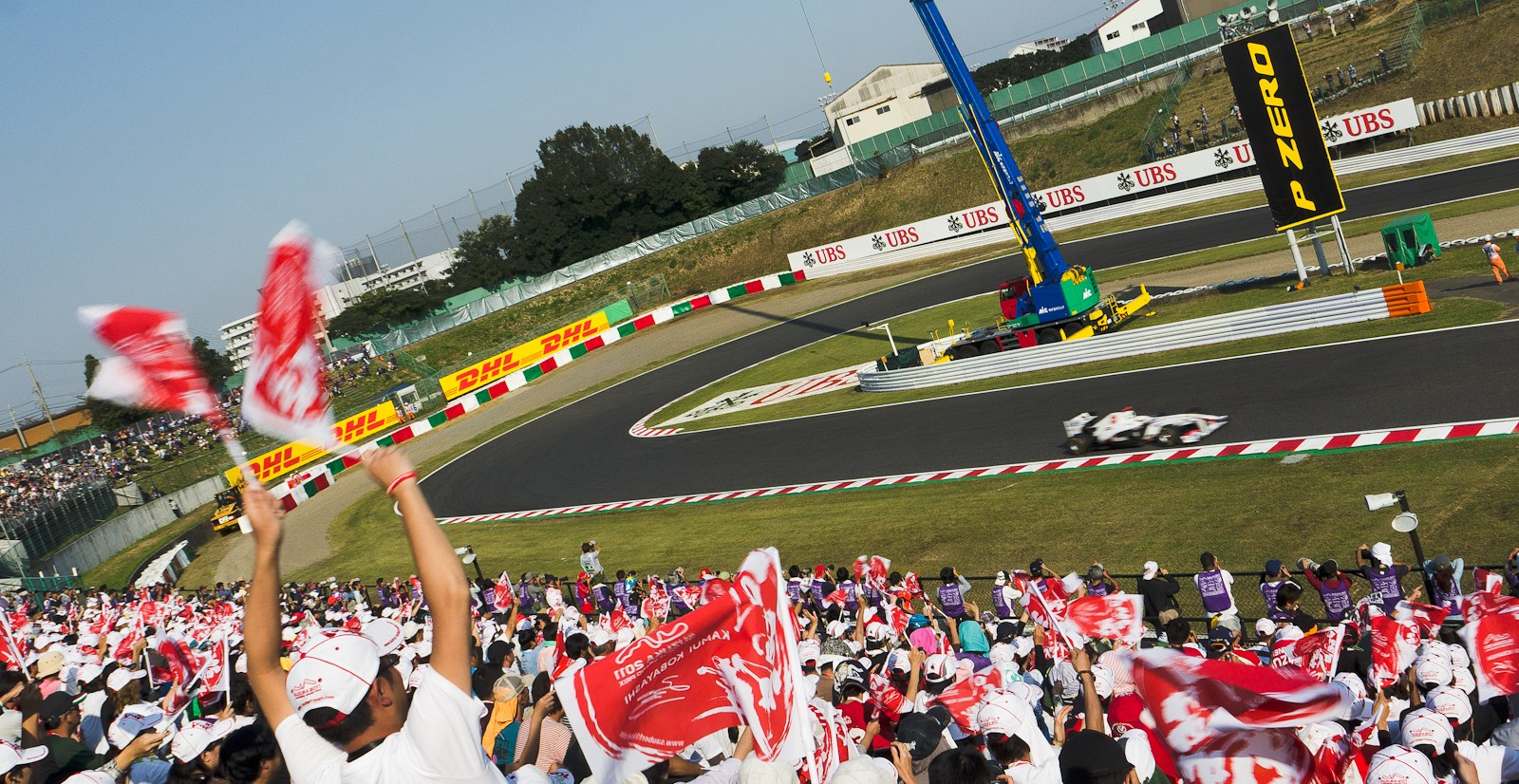
Kamui Kobayashi helped to raise awareness of the Japanese earthquake and subsequent tsunami which occurred earlier in the year.

Three practice sessions were held before the race on Sunday; the first two were held on Friday, and ran from 10:00 to 11:30, and 14:00 to 15:30 local time, respectively. The third free practice session was held on Saturday morning, before qualifying, from 10:30 until 11:30.

The first free practice session was held under clear skies and bright sunlight kept Suzuka with a steady track temperature of 30 °C (86 °F) and air temperature of 22 °C (72 °F). Pastor Maldonado skidded off the track during the session, rejoined but later parked his car in an escape road, missing out on the rest of the session. At the end of the session, whilst trying to set the fastest time, Sebastian Vettel crashed his Red Bull Racing at Degner. He finished the session in third position behind the two McLarens of Jenson Button and Lewis Hamilton; Button on top by a tenth of a second. Vettel's teammate Mark Webber eventually finished the session fifth, behind Fernando Alonso. During the session, Nico Hülkenberg filled in at Force India for Adrian Sutil, and Karun Chandhok filled in for Heikki Kovalainen at Lotus.

The second free practice session was held in an air temperature of 23 °C (73 °F), and track temperature of 37 °C (99 °F). Button again topped the timesheets ahead of Alonso and Vettel. Bruno Senna and Kamui Kobayashi both spun during the session, but both drivers rejoined. Rubens Barrichello was less fortunate, as he crashed at the first Degner curve, having run wide on entry. He was later joined on the sidelines by teammate Maldonado, as his car ground to a halt, also at Degner. After the session, Hamilton, Michael Schumacher, Sébastien Buemi, Kovalainen and Senna were called before the stewards for ignoring yellow warning flags, but no penalties were given.

In the Saturday practice session, Button was fastest again, by half a second ahead of Hamilton and almost nine tenths ahead of third-placed Vettel. Alonso, Webber and Massa were separated a tenth and a half in fourth, fifth and sixth places. Senna crashed on the exit of Spoon Curve during the session, causing a short red flag period.

=== Qualifying ===
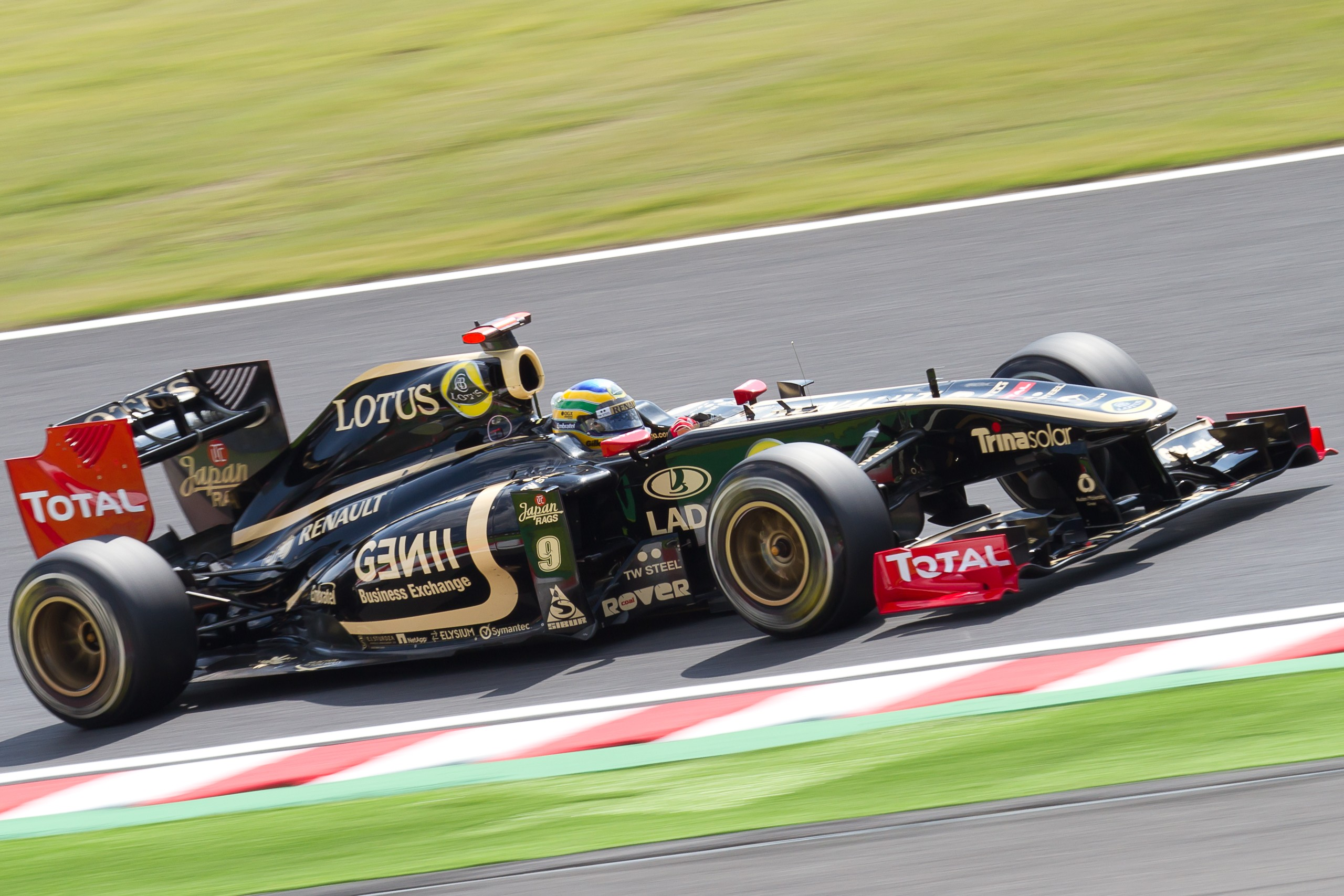
Bruno Senna qualified in ninth position.

Saturday afternoon's qualifying session was divided into three parts. In the first 20-minute period, cars finishing 18th or lower were eliminated. The second qualifying period lasted 15 minutes, at the end of which the fastest 10 cars went into the final 10-minute period to determine their starting positions for the race. This session was held in dry weather conditions and the ambient temperature was 30 °C (86 °F), while track temperature was higher than any of the practice sessions at 36 °C (97 °F).

In the first qualifying session, Sauber's Kamui Kobayashi topped the timesheets to the delight of his local fans. He along with many other drivers had decided to use the soft compound tyres to elevate themselves into the second session. Red Bull Racing, McLaren and Ferrari along with Michael Schumacher had used the medium compound tyres to get into the second part. Schumacher's Mercedes teammate, Nico Rosberg failed to set a lap time because of a hydraulics failure, and would start the race from twenty-third. It was the first time in 2011 that Rosberg had failed to make the final session. He would be joined on the back row by HRT driver Vitantonio Liuzzi – who also experienced technical problems. Liuzzi's teammate, Daniel Ricciardo, would start twenty-second behind the two Lotuses and then the two Virgins, where Heikki Kovalainen and Jérôme d'Ambrosio outqualified their respective teammates.

Every driver used the option tyres in the second session apart from Pérez, who was prevented from setting a flying lap with a problem similar to Rosberg's. The Toro Rossos occupied the row in front of him, Sébastien Buemi ahead of Jaime Alguersuari by two tenths of a second; while there was a very similar story at Williams, with Rubens Barrichello in front of Pastor Maldonado on the seventh row. In the dying moments of the session, Kobayashi, Bruno Senna and Vitaly Petrov all set lap times quick enough to progress into the top ten. This meant that the Force Indias of Adrian Sutil and Paul di Resta would have to start eleventh and twelfth respectively. Lewis Hamilton set the fastest time of the session with Sebastian Vettel and Jenson Button not far behind.

"He [Button] slowed down to get his gap and I was coming up to the last corner, trying to make sure that I had a gap between me and him. It wasn't that big and just as I was coming into the chicane I looked in my mirror and I saw Mark diving up the inside of me, and then I saw... I didn't even see Michael but as I gave Mark room, Michael nearly crashed me on the left, so it was... quite dangerous."

— Lewis Hamilton, commenting on the incident at the final chicane on his out-lap before he didn't manage to start his flying lap in time.

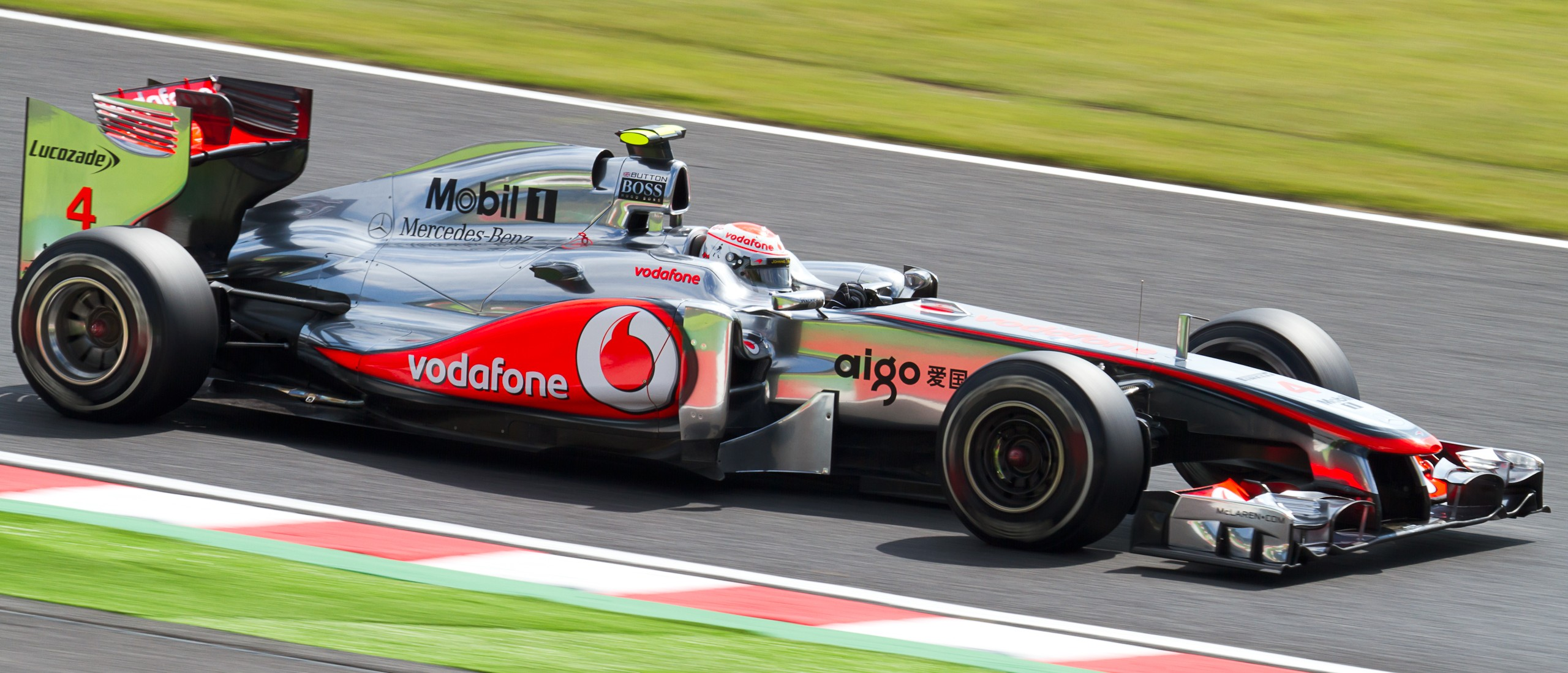
Jenson Button set the second fastest time in qualifying, marginally behind pole position holder, Sebastian Vettel.

At the start of the third session, Kobayashi appeared on the prime tyres, and after setting two sectors of a flying lap he returned to the pits. Hamilton set the initial pace, he was followed by Button, Vettel, Webber and then Felipe Massa. Seven of the cars left the pits about two minutes before the end of the session; the latest cars to leave being Hamilton, Schumacher and then Mark Webber. Hamilton, possibly not realising he had little time in which to cross the start/finish line, was making a gap to Button in front and changing dials on his steering wheel. As he approached the final chicane, Webber shot up his inside and bolted to try to get across the line in time – which he did – Hamilton backed off, surprised by what had happened and also by Schumacher cutting straight across the chicane on the outside of him. Both Hamilton and Schumacher crossed the line after the flag had fallen and missed the chance to set a flying lap. Once all the flying laps had been completed, Vettel took his twelfth pole of the season, putting him in a prime position to clinch the title the following day. The only other championship contender, Button, lined up second on the grid, 0.009 seconds off Vettel's time, his first front row start since the Monaco Grand Prix. Hamilton was third, while Massa out-qualified teammate Fernando Alonso for only the third time in 2011. Behind the two Ferraris was Webber in sixth place, who was disappointed after making an error in not opening his DRS between the hairpin and Spoon corner. Kobayashi was seventh, his highest ever qualifying place, because he had started a flying lap, unlike Schumacher, who lined up eighth on the grid. The two Renaults had also made an attempted to save tyres, and did not leave the garage, starting ninth and tenth.

=== Race ===
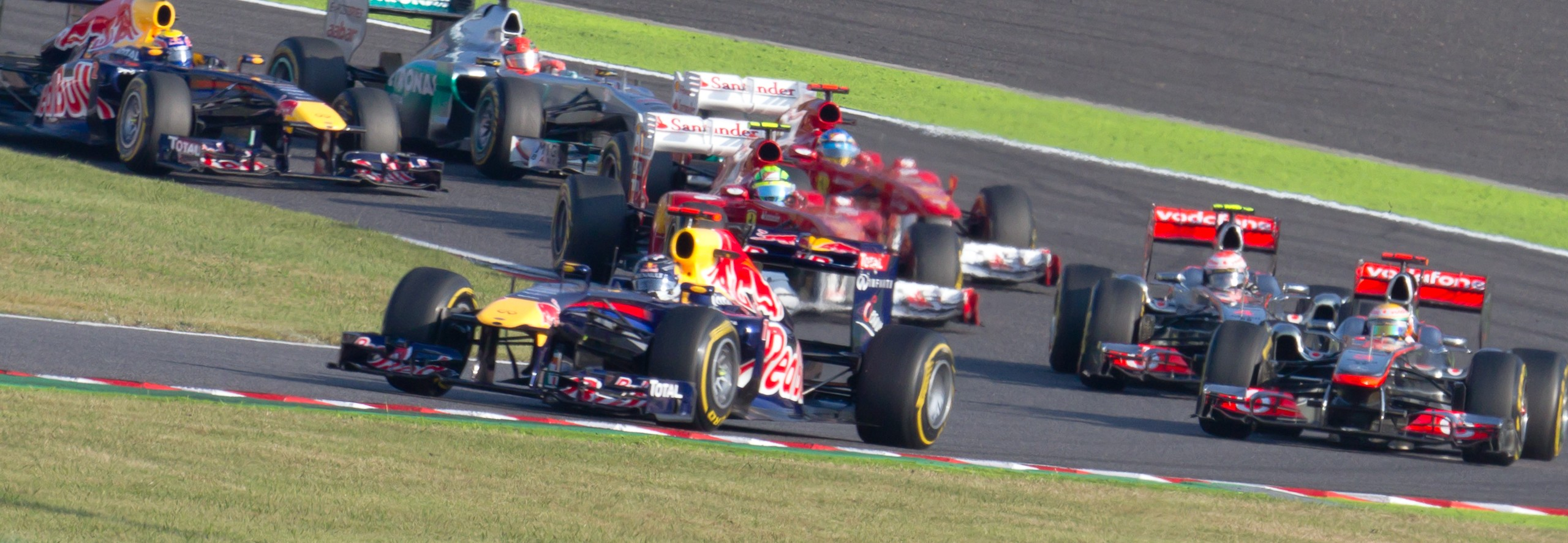
Sebastian Vettel led both the McLarens after the first corner on the opening lap.

Jenson Button made a better start off the line than Sebastian Vettel, who also had a good start compared to some cars behind him. Button attempted to overtake down the inside, but Vettel covered aggressively and Button lifted off after being half on the grass which allowed Lewis Hamilton to take him down the outside of Turn 1. Button asked his race engineer soon afterwards "He's got to get a penalty for that, hasn't he?" Martin Brundle thought the move was "harsh but not worth a penalty", while Vettel said that he had not seen Button because Button was behind him. Meanwhile, home favourite Kamui Kobayashi lost his seventh-place qualifying slot, slipping to twelfth when his anti-stall kicked in at the start. Conversely, Paul di Resta made a good start to take eighth place.

Lap 6 saw Fernando Alonso take Ferrari teammate Felipe Massa into Turn 1, for fourth place; Massa made no attempt to defend the position. Hamilton was overtaken by Button on lap 9, after developing what the team believed to be a right-rear puncture (judging by their telemetry) at the time, before later discovering it was just heavy degradation. Hamilton attempted to compensate for the puncture by slowing through 130R before pitting and changing to the option tyres. The other front runners pitted within the next couple of laps, with Vettel remaining in the lead after the first pit-stop phase. Both Red Bulls pitted together for the second time each on lap 20, a 10.3 second gap only just ensured that Vettel left the pits as soon as Webber began to enter them. The good pace and low tyre-degradation of the McLaren proved quite useful for Button, as he took the net lead on the next lap after making his pit-stop, leaving Vettel a second behind him. Also on this lap, Hamilton and Massa made contact for the fourth time in 2011, after Massa went down the outside of Hamilton on the approach to the chicane. Hamilton, seemingly unaware of Massa being there, went to take his normal line, breaking off a small endplate on the Ferrari's front wing. Hamilton blamed his wingmirrors for the contact, saying that they vibrated too much down the straights. Hamilton dived into the pits immediately afterwards, but a bad pit stop lost him more time putting him behind Massa and Webber, who had managed to pass Massa.

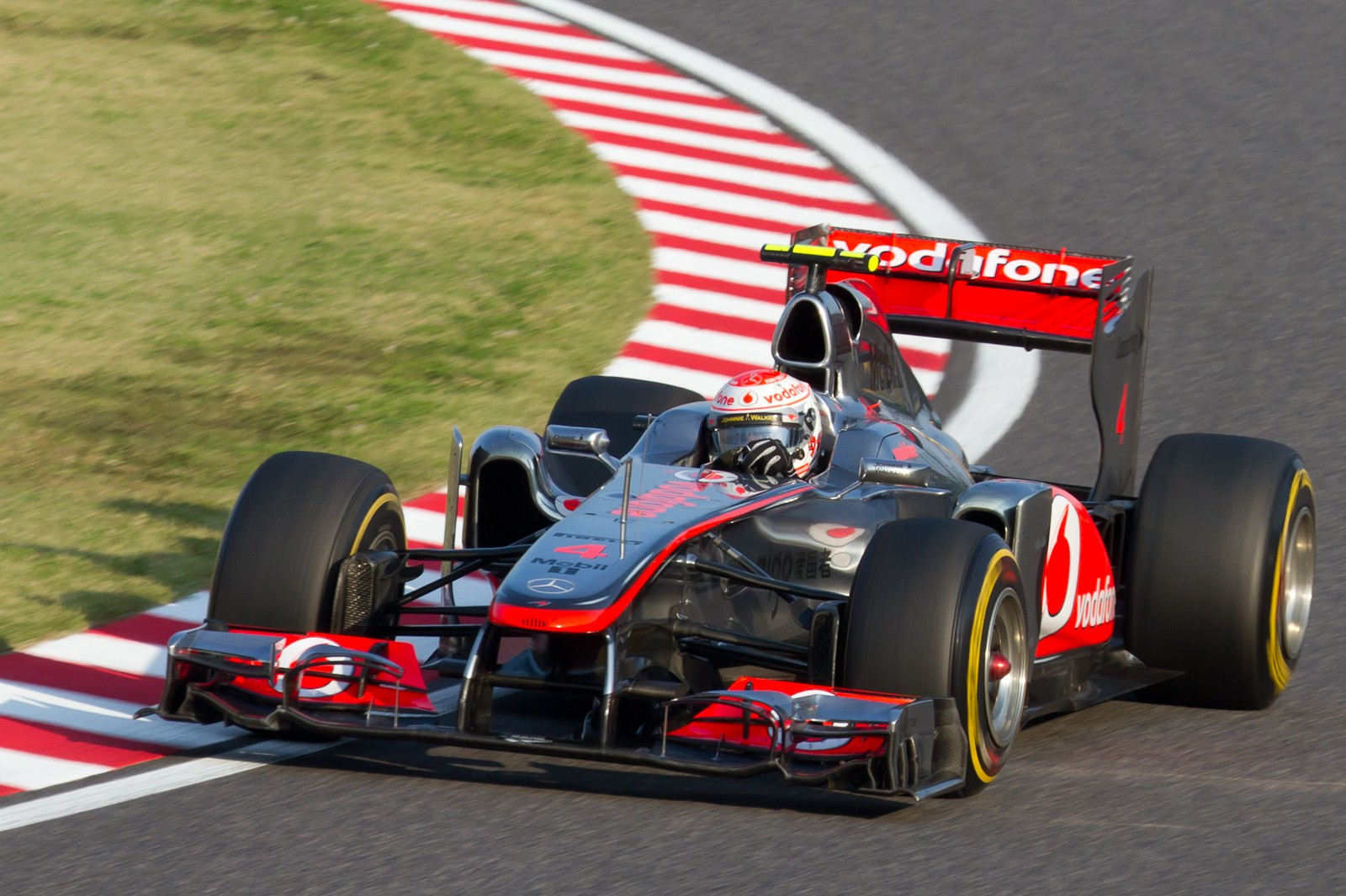
Jenson Button took the lead on lap 23, passing Sebastian Vettel during the pitstops

The awkwardly placed piece of debris that had resulted from the Massa-Hamilton collision caused the safety car to emerge on lap 24. Button slowed the pack up on the exit of 130R before restarting. Vettel pitted on lap 34, to begin his final stint on the prime tyres. Within the next three laps Webber, Massa, Hamilton and race leader Button all made their stops, all retaining position. This was until lap 38, when Hamilton overtook Massa in the DRS zone for net fifth place. Heavy traffic had slowed Vettel down on his out-lap, and Alonso moved into net second place after his stop. This left Schumacher in the lead, already being on the prime tyres, he had a longer stint before switching to the options at the end. He spent three laps in the lead in total, the first time he had led a race since the 2006 Japanese Grand Prix. When he pitted, he had got the undercut on Massa, putting Schumacher into sixth on options and Massa in seventh on primes. Schumacher's pace on the options meant that he initially challenged Hamilton for fifth but later backed off.

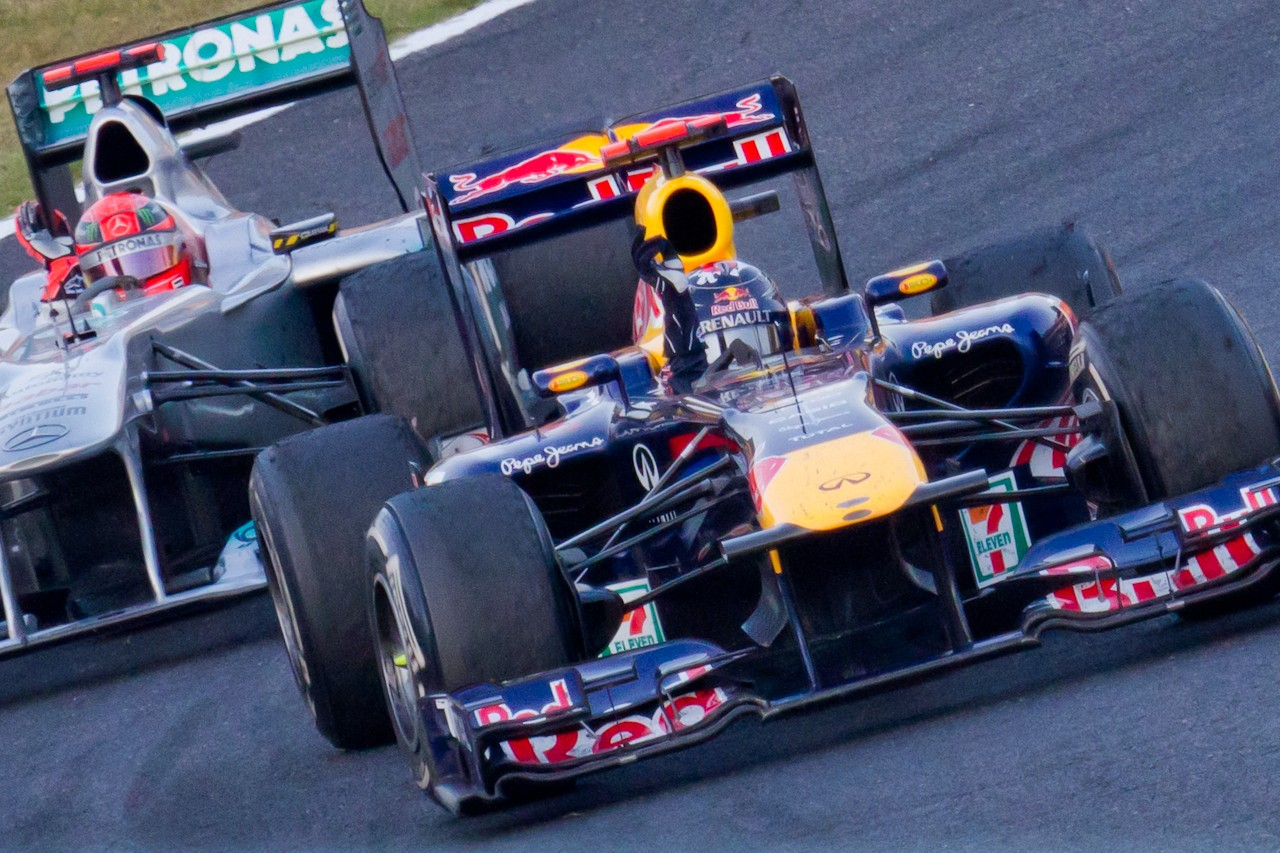
Sebastian Vettel's third-place finish meant that he won the World Drivers' Championship.

Vettel began to get closer to Alonso at this stage, diving down the outside of Turn 1 on a couple of occasions. He showed his frustration at having lost two places in the pits and at being unable to regain them when he wildly gesticulated after a Virgin got in his way whilst chasing Alonso. Throughout the final eight laps, Vettel was reminded by the team that he did not need to win the race, to win the Championship in Japan so he held position, as did teammate Webber who was in fourth. A large battle for the final points scoring positions began on lap 46, when Adrian Sutil went down the inside of 130R to pass Kobayashi for ninth. Teammate di Resta was falling back on worn out tyres though, with Vitaly Petrov taking eleventh from him only a few corners later. Petrov would then pass both Sutil and Kobayashi to finish the race in ninth place. Nico Rosberg would get ahead of both the Force Indias to claim the final points scoring position, overtaking Sutil around Dunlop on the penultimate lap. To worsen Kobayashi's race, he would eventually be taken by both Force Indias too, placing him a lowly thirteenth. Kobayashi's teammate, Sergio Pérez, made great use of a two stop strategy, by saving his tyres coming from seventeenth to eighth on race day. Force India just missed out with eleventh- and twelfth-place finishes. Lotus had a relatively successful day, finishing with both cars on the lead lap for the first time since their debut at Bahrain in 2010. This completed the most cars on the lead lap of a race ever, in Formula One.

Button took his third victory of the season, and fifth consecutive podium, just ahead of Alonso, who was only 1.1 seconds behind Button by the time he took the chequered flag. Vettel became 2011 Drivers' World Champion with four races remaining, by finishing third, taking his fourteenth podium from fifteen races. Vettel also became the youngest double World Champion, and one of only nine drivers in the sport's history to successfully defend their title. Mark Webber's solid fourth place, only 8 seconds off the lead, ensured that Red Bull Racing had already amassed more points than in their previous year's World title with 518 points. Hamilton finished fifth for the second race in a row, followed by Schumacher, Massa, Pérez, Petrov and Rosberg, who completed the ten points scoring positions.

=== Post-race ===
"To win the championship here is fantastic. There are so many things you want to say at this moment but it's hard to remember all of them. I am just so thankful to everyone in the team. We have got so many people here at the track but also at Milton Keynes working day in day out. Not only Friday, Saturday, Sunday, but also Monday to Friday, every day, pushing hard to build those two cars and to fight for a lot of points and to fight for the championship. We found ourselves in a very, very strong position and it is great to achieve the goal we set ourselves going into this year already now. There are so many people it is hard to name them all to thank, but I think one person that really stands out this year is the person I spend most of my time with during the year. It's my trainer Tommi Parmakoski. Also, regards to his family. I think back in Finland they have a great son with a great heart. He was the one not allowing me at any stage this year to lose the grip, start to fly, or think about things that are not in our control".

— Sebastian Vettel, speaking in the FIA press conference upon claiming the championship.

The top three finishers appeared on the podium and in the subsequent press conference. Button was delighted to have won in Japan, a place which was particularly special to him, because his girlfriend Jessica Michibata was born there, and because he had driven for the Japanese Honda team during his career.

"It feels like a home win, and it's a very emotional win, not just for myself, but the whole team, and especially my close-knit little team of (trainer) Mikey (Collier), the old man (father John) and (girlfriend) Jessica (Michibata)".

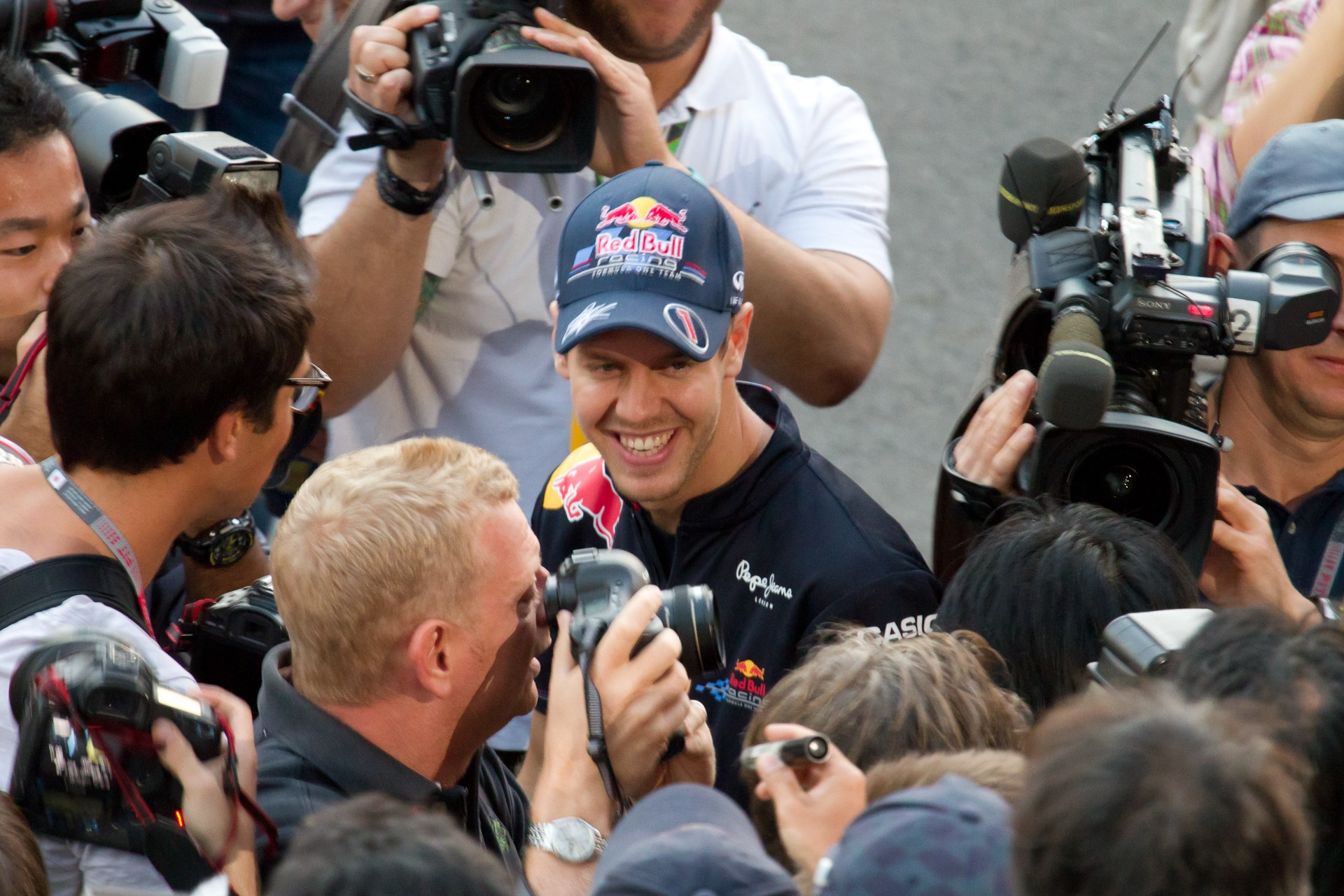
Sebastian Vettel was praised for his success in 2011 by many other Formula One World Champions.

Button was later quoted as saying: "This is one of the most perfect circuits in racing with one of the most special crowds. It means a lot to me", about his win. Martin Brundle congratulated Button on his race win, and applauded his recent form and driving throughout the weekend. Brundle was not the only one to notice Button's driving, with 1996 World Champion, Damon Hill saying: "Button is now in the sweet spot of his career – he has become like a fine wine".

"It gives us, as a team, a lot of motivation. It is good, as Sebastian said, to see three different cars within, I think, about three seconds. It shows how competitive Formula One is at the moment. There are a lot of fans here. They are so supportive of the sport that we are in and I think we have all tried to do a little bit to help them, to plant a good memory in their mind as this has been a tough year for Japan. This is a special race and a very special crowd. I think we need to thank them for supporting us. But, lastly, it should be Seb that we talk about, as this guy has done a great job this year. However hard we have tried we haven't been able to touch him in a lot of races so congratulations".

— Jenson Button in the FIA press conference for podium finishers after the race.

Button's teammate Hamilton however, did not get such a positive reception after his race. Martin Brundle criticised the amount of collisions that he was having. Even Hamilton himself described his race as "shocking", before admitting that he was "gobsmacked" by what had happened.

Many drivers congratulated Vettel on his second world title, including Jackie Stewart who described Vettel as "the most mature 24-year-old racing driver" he had ever seen. Niki Lauda was also highly complimentary of Vettel, going as far as to say that he was capable of breaking Michael Schumacher's record of seven world titles. Damon Hill however, had the opposite view, describing Vettel's chances of beating the record as "very unlikely". He did, however, praise Vettel's abilities.

Although, Vettel and Button were not the only ones receiving praise, Adrian Newey, Red Bull's chief technical officer, was congratulated by David Coulthard. Red Bull Racing left Suzuka with a 130-point advantage over McLaren in the Constructors' Championship, with a maximum of 172 points remaining at the last four races. Therefore, if Red Bull were to clinch the title at the Korean Grand Prix, they would have to either score more than McLaren, or lose out to them by no more than a single point.

== Classification ==
=== Qualifying ===
Pos	No	Driver	Constructor	Part 1	Part 2	Part 3	Grid
1	1	(Germany) Sebastian Vettel	Red Bull Racing-Renault	1:33.051	1:31.424	1:30.466	1
2	4	(United Kingdom) Jenson Button	McLaren-Mercedes	1:32.947	1:31.434	1:30.475	2
3	3	(United Kingdom) Lewis Hamilton	McLaren-Mercedes	1:32.843	1:31.139	1:30.617	3
4	6	(Brazil) Felipe Massa	Ferrari	1:33.235	1:31.909	1:30.804	4
5	5	(Spain) Fernando Alonso	Ferrari	1:32.817	1:31.612	1:30.886	5
6	2	(Australia) Mark Webber	Red Bull Racing-Renault	1:33.135	1:31.576	1:31.156	6
7	16	(Japan) Kamui Kobayashi	Sauber-Ferrari	1:32.626	1:32.380	no time^{1}	7
8	7	(Germany) Michael Schumacher	Mercedes	1:33.748	1:32.116	no time^{2}	8
9	9	(Brazil) Bruno Senna	Renault	1:33.359	1:32.297	no time^{2}	9
10	10	(Russia) Vitaly Petrov	Renault	1:32.877	1:32.245	no time^{2}	10
11	14	(Germany) Adrian Sutil	Force India-Mercedes	1:32.761	1:32.463		11
12	15	(United Kingdom) Paul di Resta	Force India-Mercedes	1:33.499	1:32.746		12
13	11	(Brazil) Rubens Barrichello	Williams-Cosworth	1:33.921	1:33.079		13
14	12	(Venezuela) Pastor Maldonado	Williams-Cosworth	1:33.781	1:33.224		14
15	18	(Switzerland) Sébastien Buemi	Toro Rosso-Ferrari	1:33.064	1:33.227		15
16	19	(Spain) Jaime Alguersuari	Toro Rosso-Ferrari	1:35.111	1:33.427		16
17	17	(Mexico) Sergio Pérez	Sauber-Ferrari	1:34.704	no time^{2}		17
18	20	(Finland) Heikki Kovalainen	Lotus-Renault	1:35.454			18
19	21	(Italy) Jarno Trulli	Lotus-Renault	1:35.514			19
20	25	(Belgium) Jérôme d'Ambrosio	Virgin-Cosworth	1:36.439			20
21	24	(Germany) Timo Glock	Virgin-Cosworth	1:36.507			21
22	22	(Australia) Daniel Ricciardo	HRT-Cosworth	1:37.846			22
107% time: 1:39.109
23	8	(Germany) Nico Rosberg	Mercedes	no time^{3}			23
24	23	(Italy) Vitantonio Liuzzi	HRT-Cosworth	no time^{3}			24

Notes:

^1 – Kamui Kobayashi failed to set a lap time in Q3 in an effort to preserve his tyres for the race. However, as he had left the pits and started a flying lap, he was entitled to start further up the grid than if he had remained in his garage.
^2 – Michael Schumacher, Bruno Senna and Vitaly Petrov did not set lap times in order to preserve their tyres for the race. Unlike Kobayashi, Schumacher, Senna and Petrov did not leave their pit garages, thus moving them down the grid order.
^3 – Nico Rosberg and Vitantonio Liuzzi failed to set lap times after experiencing technical problems that prevented them from taking to the circuit. They were later permitted to take part in the race, though Liuzzi did not set a lap time within 107% over the weekend due to mechanical problems.

=== Race ===
Pos	No	Driver	Constructor	Laps	Time/Retired	Grid	Points
1	4	(United Kingdom) Jenson Button	McLaren-Mercedes	53	1:30:53.427	2	25
2	5	(Spain) Fernando Alonso	Ferrari	53	+1.160	5	18
3	1	(Germany) Sebastian Vettel	Red Bull Racing-Renault	53	+2.006	1	15
4	2	(Australia) Mark Webber	Red Bull Racing-Renault	53	+8.071	6	12
5	3	(United Kingdom) Lewis Hamilton	McLaren-Mercedes	53	+24.268	3	10
6	7	(Germany) Michael Schumacher	Mercedes	53	+27.120	8	8
7	6	(Brazil) Felipe Massa	Ferrari	53	+28.240	4	6
8	17	(Mexico) Sergio Pérez	Sauber-Ferrari	53	+39.377	17	4
9	10	(Russia) Vitaly Petrov	Renault	53	+42.607	10	2
10	8	(Germany) Nico Rosberg	Mercedes	53	+44.322	23	1
11	14	(Germany) Adrian Sutil	Force India-Mercedes	53	+54.447	11	
12	15	(United Kingdom) Paul di Resta	Force India-Mercedes	53	+1:02.326	12	
13	16	(Japan) Kamui Kobayashi	Sauber-Ferrari	53	+1:03.705	7	
14	12	(Venezuela) Pastor Maldonado	Williams-Cosworth	53	+1:04.194	14	
15	19	(Spain) Jaime Alguersuari	Toro Rosso-Ferrari	53	+1:06.623	16	
16	9	(Brazil) Bruno Senna	Renault	53	+1:12.628	9	
17	11	(Brazil) Rubens Barrichello	Williams-Cosworth	53	+1:14.191	13	
18	20	(Finland) Heikki Kovalainen	Lotus-Renault	53	+1:27.824	18	
19	21	(Italy) Jarno Trulli	Lotus-Renault	53	+1:36.140	19	
20	24	(Germany) Timo Glock	Virgin-Cosworth	51	+2 Laps	21	
21	25	(Belgium) Jérôme d'Ambrosio	Virgin-Cosworth	51	+2 Laps	20	
22	22	(Australia) Daniel Ricciardo	HRT-Cosworth	51	+2 Laps	22	
23	23	(Italy) Vitantonio Liuzzi	HRT-Cosworth	50	+3 Laps	24	
Ret	18	(Switzerland) Sébastien Buemi	Toro Rosso-Ferrari	11	Wheel	15	

== Championship standings after the race ==
Drivers' Championship standings

Pos.	Driver	Points
1	(Germany) **Sebastian Vettel**	324
2	(United Kingdom) Jenson Button	210
3	(Spain) Fernando Alonso	202
4	(Australia) Mark Webber	194
5	(United Kingdom) Lewis Hamilton	178

Constructors' Championship standings

Pos.	Constructor	Points
1	(Austria) **Red Bull Racing-Renault***	518
2	(United Kingdom) **McLaren-Mercedes***	388
3	(Italy) Ferrari	292
4	(Germany) Mercedes	123
5	(United Kingdom) Renault	72

- Note: Only the top five positions are included for both sets of standings.
- **Bold text** indicates the 2011 World Drivers' Champion.
- **Bold text** and an asterisk indicates whose who still had a theoretical chance of becoming World Champion.

Previous race: 2011 Singapore Grand Prix	FIA Formula One World Championship; 2011 season	Next race: 2011 Korean Grand Prix
Previous race: 2010 Japanese Grand Prix	Japanese Grand Prix	Next race: 2012 Japanese Grand Prix
