= Marussia MR01 =

Formula One motor racing car

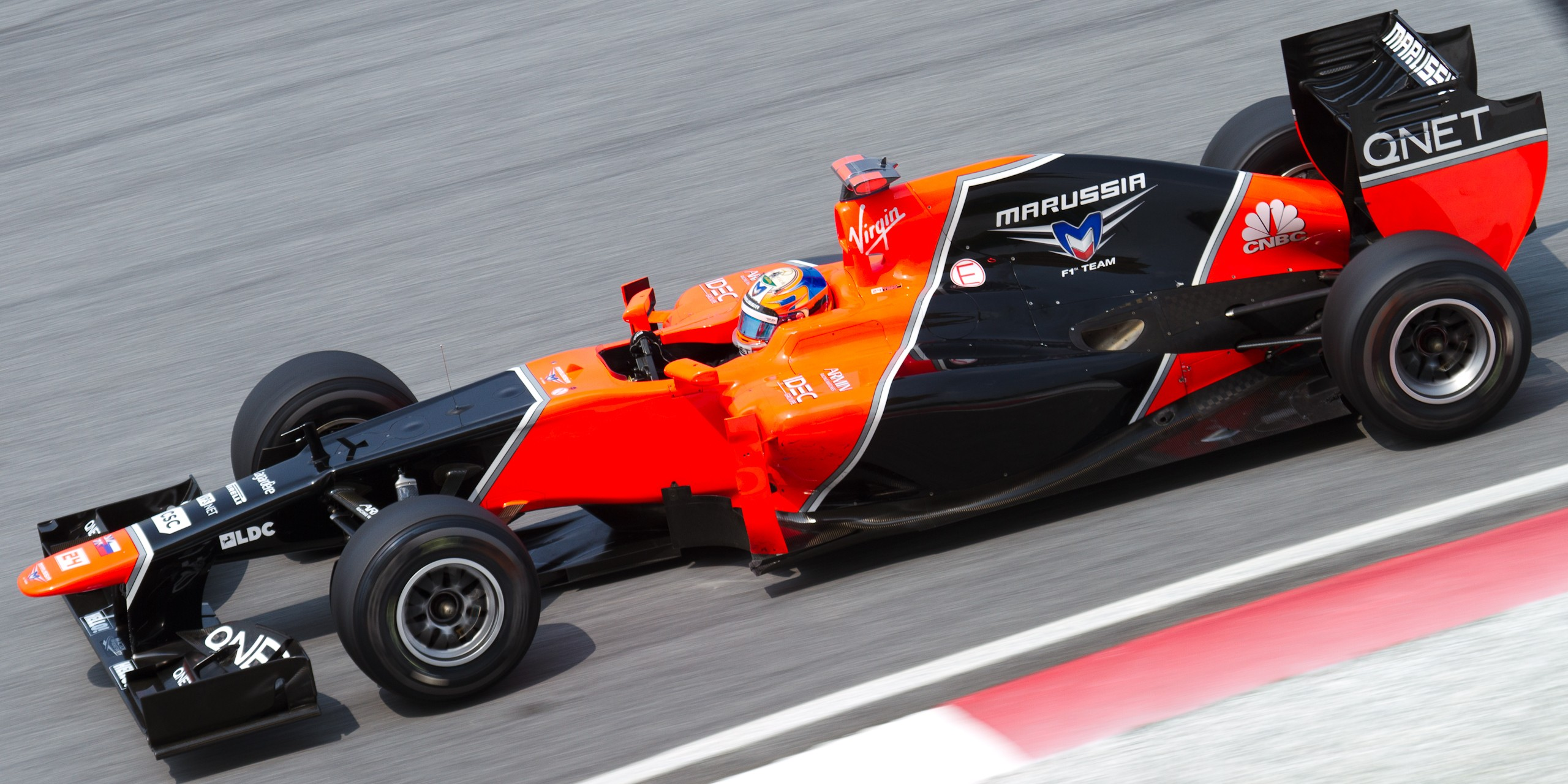
- Timo Glock driving the MR01 at the Malaysian Grand Prix
- Category: Formula One
- Constructor: Marussia
- Designers: Nikolay Fomenko (Engineering Director); John McQuilliam (Chief Designer); Rob Taylor (Deputy Chief Designer); Richard Taylor (Head of Aerodynamics); Pat Symonds (Technical Consultant)
- Predecessor: Virgin MVR-02
- Successor: Marussia MR02

Technical specifications
- Chassis: Carbon fibre monocoque
- Suspension (front): Carbon fibre double wishbone suspension, with Penske dampers
- Suspension (rear): As front
- Engine: Cosworth CA2012 2,400 cc (146.5 cu in) 90° V8, limited to 18,000 RPM, naturally aspirated, mid-mounted
- Transmission: Marussia-housed Xtrac 7-speed
- Fuel: Sunoco 260 GT Plus 94.25% 102 RON unleaded gasoline + 5.75% biofuel
- Tyres: Pirelli P Zero (dry), Cinturato (wet); BBS Wheels (front and rear): 13"

Competition history
- Notable entrants: Marussia F1 Team
- Notable drivers: 24. (Germany) Timo Glock; 25. (France) Charles Pic
- Debut: 2012 Australian Grand Prix
- Last event: 2012 Brazilian Grand Prix
Races	Wins	Podiums	Poles	F/Laps
20	0	0	0	0

The Marussia MR01 (originally known as the Virgin MVR-03) is the first Formula One racing car designed by Marussia F1 for the 2012 Formula One season, which was driven by Timo Glock and French rookie driver Charles Pic.

== Design ==
Unlike its predecessors, the Virgin VR-01 and Virgin MVR-02, the Marussia MR01 was not designed exclusively with computational fluid dynamics (CFD); instead, the design team employed a combination of wind tunnel testing and CFD modelling in its design. Due to development delays, the team planned to launch the MR01 at the third and final pre-season test session at the Circuit de Catalunya on 1 March 2012, but as the car was unable to pass its mandatory crash tests prior to the final test session the team was not permitted to take part. According to technical advisor Pat Symonds, the car failed its crash tests because one part of the car was performing "inconsistently". The car was later launched on 5 March, following a shakedown at Silverstone Circuit, before passing its final mandatory crash test on 6 March.

The MR01 was the only car to compete initially in the 2012 season without a Kinetic Energy Recovery System (KERS), regenerative braking device, though HRT later admitted that their car did not feature KERS. The MR01 was one of only three cars (the others being the McLaren MP4-27 and the HRT F112) not to feature the stepped nose common to most 2012 season designs.

Initially, the MR01 featured a plain nose cone that ran by the conventions of the other teams (flat noses). By the 2012 British Grand Prix, the MR01 sported a bigger nose, making it similar to the solutions used by Force India in 2010 and 2011.

== Season overview ==
Due to the MR01 not having any proper testing time, the Australian Grand Prix was essentially a test session to see where the car was. Unlike rivals HRT, the MR01 was able to run both drivers, with Glock managing twelfth in the second Friday practice session. By Saturday, however, the two Marussias fell to their familiar qualifying spots on the back two rows. However, due to the 107% rule both HRTs failed to qualify, and Sergio Pérez was forced down to 22nd position due to a penalty for changing his gearbox, making the MR01's first qualifying record as 20th and 21st. Glock and Pic stayed towards the back in the race, but picked up places as cars either retired or pitted. During the sole safety car period of the race, the MR01 was able to use the reinstated rule that allows lapped cars to un-lap themselves prior to the race restart. Glock finished the race 14th, while Pic was forced to retire five laps from the finish due to falling oil pressure, but was classified in 15th place as he had completed over 90% of the race distance.

At the second round, the Malaysian Grand Prix, the Marussia MR01 continued to show pace and reliability. Constantly, throughout the weekend, Glock and Pic outpaced their HRT rivals and were able to come very close to Caterham's Heikki Kovalainen and Vitaly Petrov. The two qualified 21st and 22nd, Glock leading Pic. But once the race began on Sunday conditions deteriorated drastically, with the race being red-flagged on lap nine due to torrential rain. After an hour track conditions improved and the race was restarted. Glock finished in 17th, one lap down on the leaders, while Pic made another Marussia double finish with 20th. Due to Petrov only finishing 16th, the Marussia retained 10th place in the Constructors' Championship.

After a three-week break, the MR01 entered the Chinese Grand Prix with minor technical updates. The weekend began with abnormally cold temperatures, and Glock suffered an accident during free practice on Saturday. After a look over, Glock and his MR01 continued into qualification, and he and Pic again qualified 20th and 21st for the race. In the early phase of the race tyre problems plagued everyone, with high wear and degradation causing many teams to alter their strategies. The two Marussias fended off both HRTs and Kovalainen's Caterham to finish 19th and 20th.

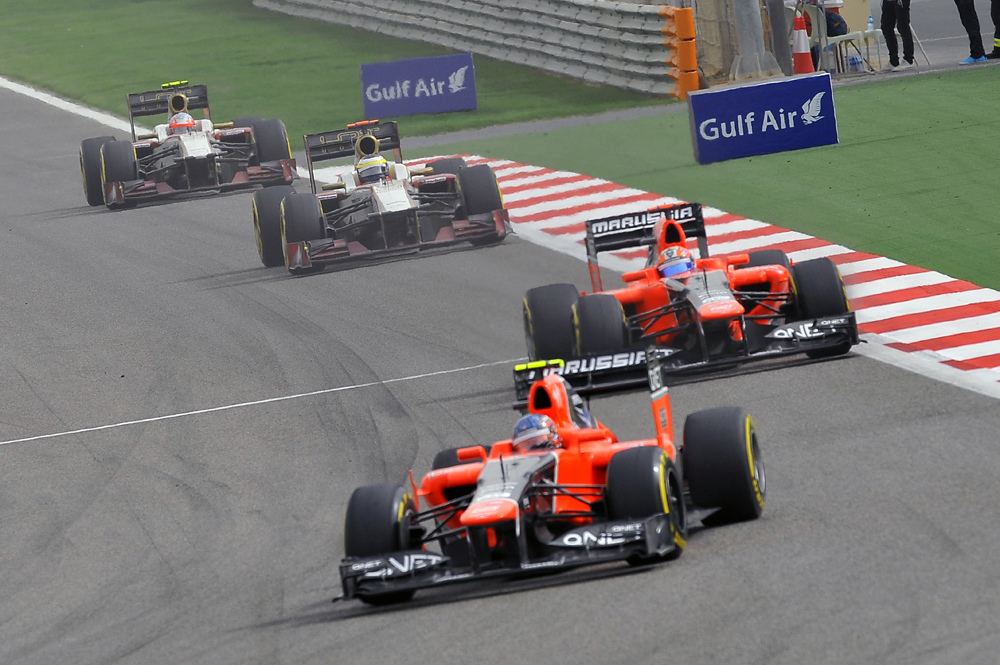
Charles Pic and teammate Timo Glock leading the HRTs during the Bahrain Grand Prix

Initially, the Bahrain Grand Prix was under intense criticism regarding whether it should go ahead or be cancelled once again. Qualifying was a first for the MR01 in two ways: Glock only managed 23rd, his worst performance for the season, and Pic out-qualified his teammate for the first time, in 21st. In the race Pic retired on lap 24 with engine issues, leaving Glock to bring the team home. He finished two laps down in 19th, behind the Caterhams and Jenson Button, but ahead of both HRTs and both Williams cars of Pastor Maldonado and Bruno Senna.

At Spa, Pic set the fastest lap time in a wet Free Practice 2; the highest ever result for the team in any official F1 session. This was due to many teams not setting competitive laps due to the poor conditions. Glock was 6th in the session.

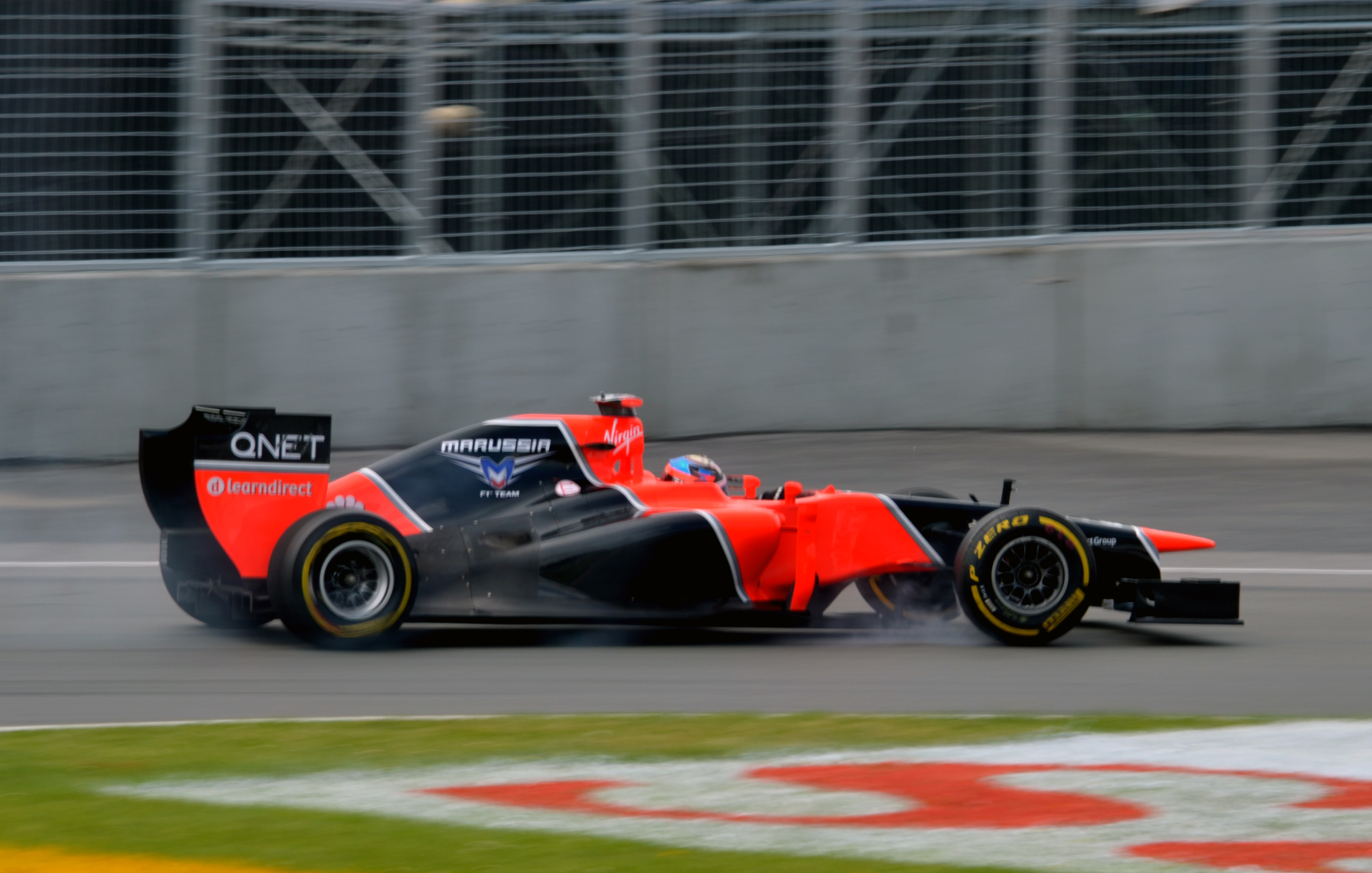
Glock at the Canadian Grand Prix

At Singapore, Glock produced his best result for Marussia, finishing in 12th place (making this chassis statistically the most successful for the Virgin/Marussia team), and this crucially put Marussia in front of Caterham in the fight for 10th position in the Constructors' Championship, due to a better non-points finishing record.

== Test accident ==
On 3 July 2012, test driver María de Villota was testing a car at Duxford Airfield, when she crashed heavily into the lift gate of the team transporter, and sustained serious injuries. She had been performing straight line aerodynamic tests in preparation for the British Grand Prix. On 4 July 2012, it was confirmed that de Villota lost her right eye as a result of the accident. A year later, she died as a result of the injuries.

== Complete Formula One results ==
(key) (results in bold indicate pole position; results in italics indicate fastest lap)

Year	Entrant	Engine	Tyres	Drivers	1	2	3	4	5	6	7	8	9	10	11	12	13	14	15	16	17	18	19	20	Points	WCC
2012	Marussia F1 Team	Cosworth CA2012	**P**		AUS	MAL	CHN	BHR	ESP	MON	CAN	EUR	GBR	GER	HUN	BEL	ITA	SIN	JPN	KOR	IND	ABU	USA	BRA	0	11th
2012	Marussia F1 Team	Cosworth CA2012	**P**	Timo Glock	14	17	19	19	18	14	Ret	DNS	18	22	21	15	17	12	16	18	20	14	19	16	0	11th
2012	Marussia F1 Team	Cosworth CA2012	**P**	Charles Pic	15^{†}	20	20	Ret	Ret	Ret	20	15	19	20	20	16	16	16	Ret	19	19	Ret	20	12	0	11th

^{†} Driver failed to finish the race, but was classified as they had completed greater than 90% of the race distance.
