= HRT F112 =

Formula One racing car

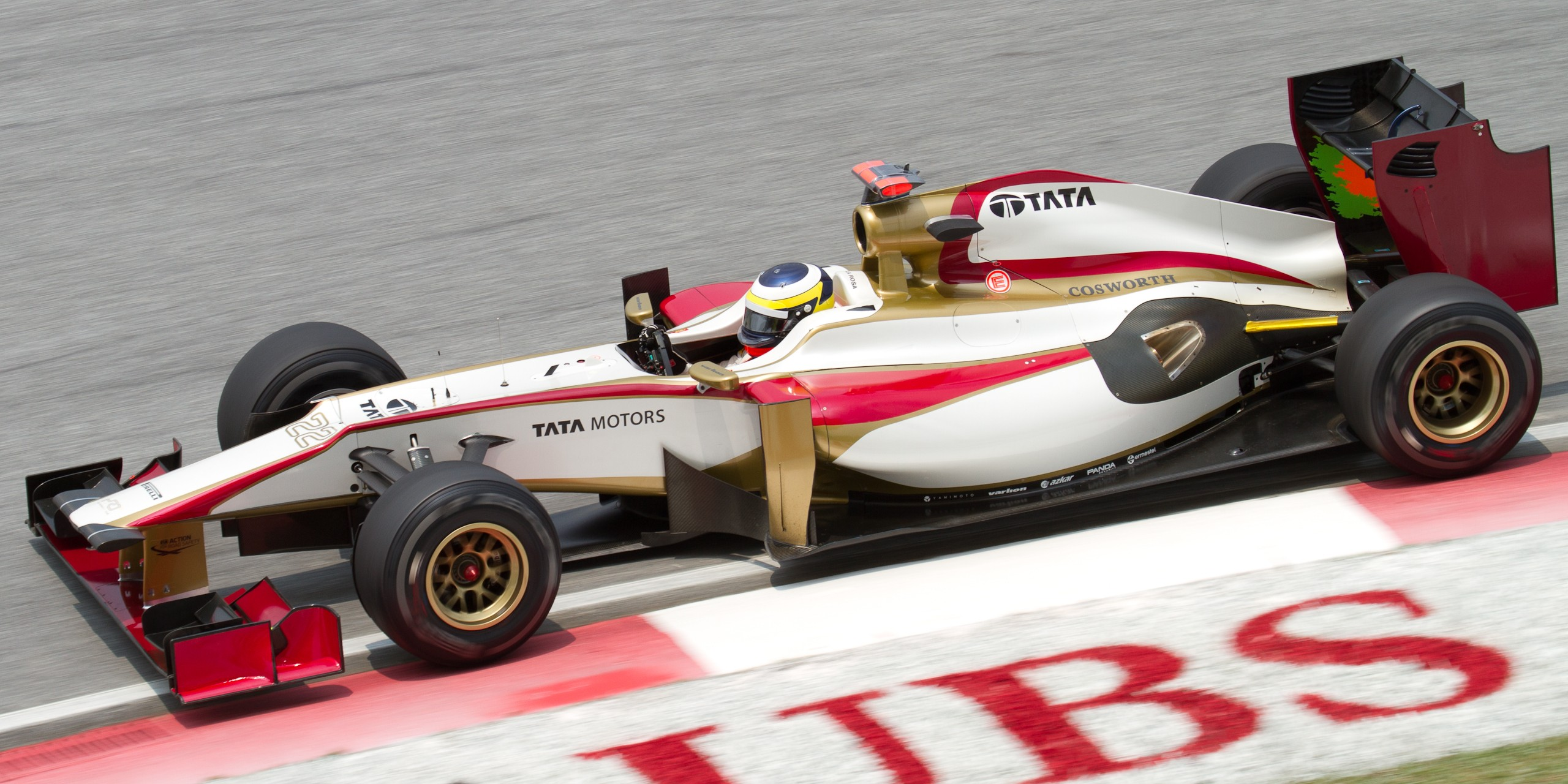
- Pedro de la Rosa driving the F112 at the Malaysian Grand Prix
- Category: Formula One
- Constructor: HRT
- Designers: Jean-Claude Martens (Technical Director); Paul White (Chief Designer); Stéphane Chosse (Head of Aerodynamics)
- Predecessor: Hispania F111

Technical specifications
- Engine: Cosworth CA2012 2.4 L V8 Naturally Aspirated mid-mounted
- Transmission: 7 Speed Forward + 1 Reverse Speed
- Fuel: Cepsa
- Tyres: Pirelli P Zero (dry), Cinturato (wet)

Competition history
- Notable entrants: HRT Formula 1 Team
- Notable drivers: 22. (Spain) Pedro de la Rosa; 23. (India) Narain Karthikeyan
- Debut: 2012 Australian Grand Prix
- Last event: 2012 Brazilian Grand Prix
| Races | Wins | Podiums | Poles | F/Laps |
|---|---|---|---|---|
| 20 | 0 | 0 | 0 | 0 |

The HRT F112 is the last Formula One racing car designed by HRT F1 Team for use in the 2012 Formula One season. The car was driven by Pedro de la Rosa and Narain Karthikeyan with Dani Clos and Ma Qinghua acting as test drivers.

== Development ==
The car was expected to be launched on 21 February, but was delayed until March when it failed two of its mandatory crash tests, and was unable to take a third test as passing one of the tests it failed was a pre-requisite of this third test. The car successfully completed its final crash test on 24 February. The team initially attempted to have the car ready for the third test of the off season in Barcelona, but were unable to make the deadline. The car made its on-track debut at the circuit on 5 March, during a combined shakedown and filming day, with Karthikeyan completing the maximum allowable one hundred kilometres for a shakedown. The car was launched with a white, gold and red livery, their third livery change in as many years.

The team faced further complications at the Australian Grand Prix when the chassis intended to be raced by Pedro de la Rosa was not finished before scrutineering on Thursday afternoon. The team requested the race stewards delay scrutineering of the car until Friday morning, with the FIA agreeing. The car was completed on time and approved by the race stewards. Although both cars took part in qualifying, neither driver qualified within 107% of the fastest time set in the first qualifying period, and they were blocked from starting the race for the second year in a row. The team admitted they were expecting to miss the qualifying cut-off, with team principal Luis Pérez-Sala predicting that the car would not be fully capable of qualifying until the second or third race of the season. It joined the Marussia MR01 in being the only cars that year not to use KERS, and also lacked a brake bias handle in the cockpit.

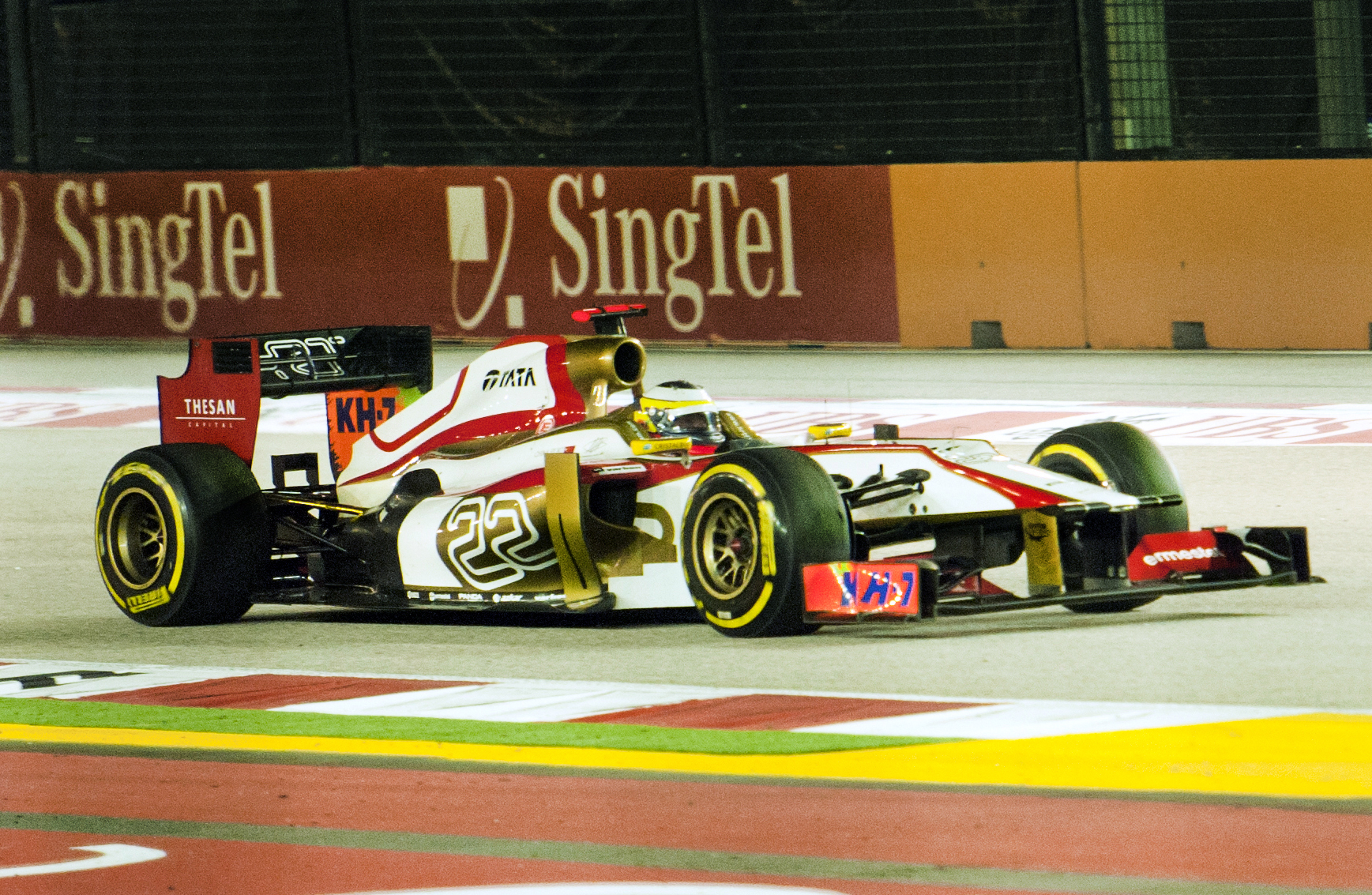
De la Rosa during the Singapore Grand Prix

The car's pace steadily improved over the course of the season, however their main rivals Marussia and Caterham improved too, leaving it as the outright slowest car on the grid that season, only managing once to beat any of their rivals on outright pace, with de la Rosa edging out Timo Glock at Germany and Karthikeyan closing in on him in the closing laps. The car had very strong pace at Canada, bringing a new low-downforce rear wing which helped de la Rosa out-qualify both the Marussias and enabled him and Karthikeyan to match their pace in the race until they both retired with brake failure. They both out-qualified Charles Pic's Marussia at Valencia and were within 103.7% of the fastest Q1 time, a personal best for the season. De la Rosa out-qualified Karthikeyan at every race except Monza, Singapore and Brazil, and out-raced him at every race except Malaysia, though de la Rosa was eventually classified ahead as Karthikeyan was given a post-race time penalty for giving Sebastian Vettel a puncture whilst being lapped. After the summer break they suffered from increasing reliability issues due to the declining financial situation in the team which gave rise to rumours they were short of resources and were using components beyond their expected lifespan.

== Sponsorship and livery ==
The F112's livery was directly based on Force India's 2008 livery, mainly the red, white and gold. The team had a sponsorship from Tata Group and its automobile division along with other smaller sponsors: KH-7, Panda Security, Yamimoto, Varlion, Transportes Azkar, Ermestel and Thesan Capital. Starting from the Spanish Grand Prix, the sidepods feature the drivers' numbers in gold.

Karthikeyan's F112 during the United States Grand Prix.

From the Italian Grand Prix onwards, until the end of the season, China Sport Management became a sponsor of the team. Tata Tea sponsored HRT at the Singapore and Indian Grands Prix as well Tetley at the Korean Grand Prix.

== Aftermath ==
After HRT went in to administration in November 2012 both F112 chassis were purchased by Teo Martín.

== Complete Formula One results ==
(key) (results in bold indicate pole position; results in italics indicate fastest lap)

| Year | Entrant | Engine | Tyres | Drivers | 1 | 2 | 3 | 4 | 5 | 6 | 7 | 8 | 9 | 10 | 11 | 12 | 13 | 14 | 15 | 16 | 17 | 18 | 19 | 20 | Points | WCC |
|---|---|---|---|---|---|---|---|---|---|---|---|---|---|---|---|---|---|---|---|---|---|---|---|---|---|---|
| 2012 | HRT F1 Team | Cosworth CA2012 | **P** | | AUS | MAL | CHN | BHR | ESP | MON | CAN | EUR | GBR | GER | HUN | BEL | ITA | SIN | JPN | KOR | IND | ABU | USA | BRA | 0 | 12th |
| 2012 | HRT F1 Team | Cosworth CA2012 | **P** | Pedro de la Rosa | DNQ | 21 | 21 | 20 | 19 | Ret | Ret | 17 | 20 | 21 | 22 | 18 | 18 | 17 | 18 | Ret | Ret | 17 | 21 | 17 | 0 | 12th |
| 2012 | HRT F1 Team | Cosworth CA2012 | **P** | Narain Karthikeyan | DNQ | 22 | 22 | 21 | Ret | 15 | Ret | 18 | 21 | 23 | Ret | Ret | 19 | Ret | Ret | 20 | 21 | Ret | 22 | 18 | 0 | 12th |
