= 2012 V8 Supercars Albert Park Challenge =

(Victoria (state)) 2012 V8 Supercars Albert Park Challenge
Event Information
- Date: 25–28 March 2012
- Location: Melbourne, Victoria
- Venue: Melbourne Grand Prix Circuit
- Weather: Fine

Results
Race 1
Distance	12 laps	64 km
Pole position	Mark Winterbottom; Ford Performance Racing	
Winner	Mark Winterbottom; Ford Performance Racing	24:34.7788
Race 2
Distance	7 laps	37 km
Winner	Mark Winterbottom; Ford Performance Racing	42:52.4637
Race 3
Distance	15 laps	80 km
Winner	Shane van Gisbergen; Stone Brothers Racing	30:36.8057
Round Results
First	Mark Winterbottom; Ford Performance Racing	274 pts
Second	Shane van Gisbergen; Stone Brothers Racing	272 pts
Third	Garth Tander; Holden Racing Team	264 pts

The 2012 V8 Supercars Albert Park Challenge was a motor race for the Australian sedan-based V8 Supercars. It was a stand-alone event not part of the 2012 International V8 Supercars Championship but it was attended by all of the International Championship's teams. The event was held as the principal support event of the 2012 Australian Grand Prix.

The event was won by Ford Performance Racing's lead-driver Mark Winterbottom after winning the qualifying race and the second and third races of the event. Fifth place in the final race was enough to claim a two-point win over Shane van Gisbergen of Stone Brothers Racing despite Van Gisbergen winning the fourth race. Winterbottom won $100,000 as the big prize of the non-championship event. Garth Tander was third driving for the Holden Racing Team.

The event was marred by a multi-car pile-up in the third race in the opening lap when Jamie Whincup spun in the middle of the pack after contact from James Courtney as the field negotiated turn 3. Karl Reindler, Taz Douglas and Russell Ingall subsequently became involved. There was a long delay as there was a fuel leak from Reindler's Holden Commodore which needed to be cleaned up. The race was restarted but drastically shortened so as to not delay qualifying for the Australian Grand Prix.
