= 2012 Australian Grand Prix =

Race 1 of 20 in the 2012 Formula One World Championship
← Previous race	Next race →

Race details
- Date: 18 March 2012
- Official name: 2012 Formula 1 Qantas Australian Grand Prix
- Location: Melbourne Grand Prix Circuit, Melbourne, Australia
- Course: Temporary street circuit
- Course length: 5.303 km (3.295 miles)
- Distance: 58 laps, 307.574 km (191.118 miles)
- Weather: Fine Air Temp 22 °C (72 °F) Track Temp 30 °C (86 °F) dropping to 22 °C (72 °F)
- Attendance: 114,900

Pole position
Driver	(United Kingdom) Lewis Hamilton	McLaren-Mercedes
- Time: 1:24.922

Fastest lap
Driver	(United Kingdom) Jenson Button	McLaren-Mercedes
- Time: 1:29.187 on lap 56

Podium
First	(United Kingdom) Jenson Button	McLaren-Mercedes
Second	(Germany) Sebastian Vettel	Red Bull-Renault
Third	(United Kingdom) Lewis Hamilton	McLaren-Mercedes

The 2012 Australian Grand Prix (formally, the 2012 Formula 1 Qantas Australian Grand Prix) was a Formula One motor race held on 18 March 2012 as the opening round of the 2012 Formula One season. It was the 77th race in the combined history of the Australian Grand Prix that dates back to the 100 Miles Road Race of 1928, and the 17th time the event has been held at the Melbourne Grand Prix Circuit at Albert Park.

The 58-lap race was won by McLaren driver Jenson Button who took his third victory at the Albert Park Circuit. Reigning double World Champion Sebastian Vettel, driving for Red Bull Racing, finished in second place, while polesitter and Button's McLaren teammate Lewis Hamilton completed the podium.

Australian Mark Webber was fourth, his best result in his home Grand Prix. Webber's fourth place was the best finish by an Australian in an Australian Grand Prix since Alfredo Costanzo finished fourth in 1984, the last time the race was run under Australian domestic rules before becoming a round of the World Championship in 1985.

== Report ==
=== Background ===
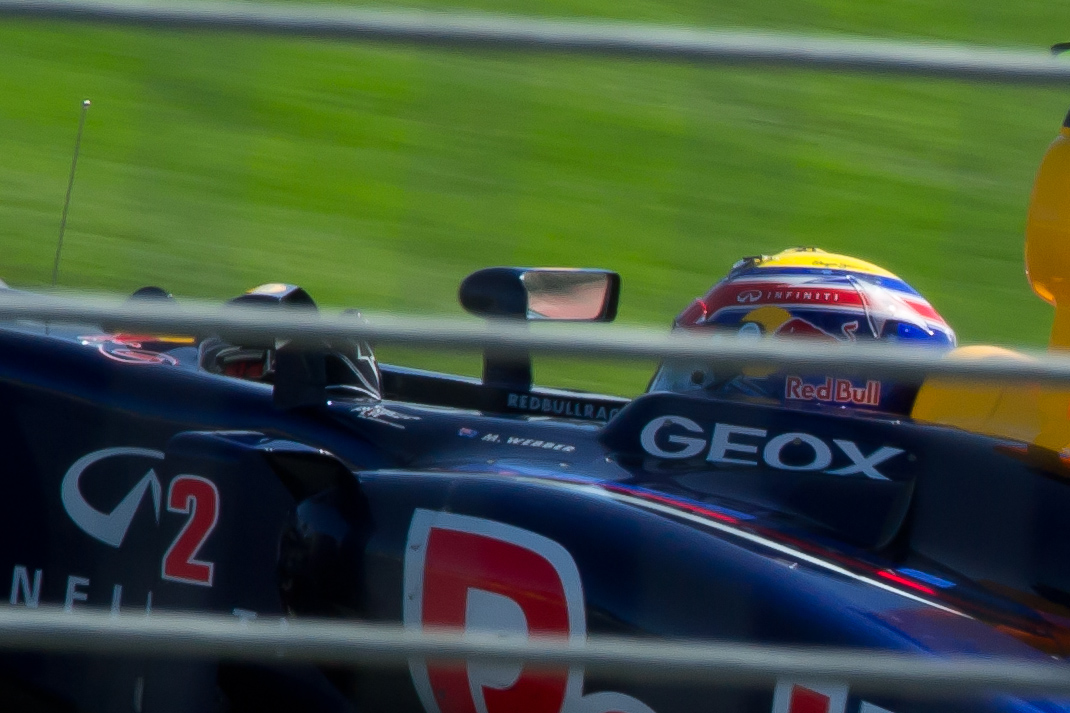
Mark Webber came into his home Grand Prix hoping to finish higher than his personal best of fifth place.

With Vitantonio Liuzzi unable to secure a seat for 2012 and Jarno Trulli being replaced at Caterham during the pre-season, the race was the first Grand Prix since the 1973 German Grand Prix not to feature an Italian driver on the grid. It was also the first Grand Prix to feature six current and former Formula One World Champions taking part in the race. It was the first Australian Grand Prix to feature two Australians on the grid.

After using one Drag Reduction System (DRS) zone in 2011, the circuit featured two zones for the 2012 race. These were located along the main straight and between Turns 2 and 3, with a single detection point for both zones—similar to the format trialled at the 2011 Canadian and European Grands Prix—located at the entry to Turn 14. Other modifications to the circuit included the introduction of thicker, spongier astroturf on the exit of several corners to discourage drivers from driving beyond the limits of the circuit.

Mercedes were the subject of an investigation by the scrutineers over the use of a "radical" rear wing concept on the F1 W03. Charlie Whiting, the FIA's technical delegate, examined the car on the Thursday before the race and declared it to be legal.

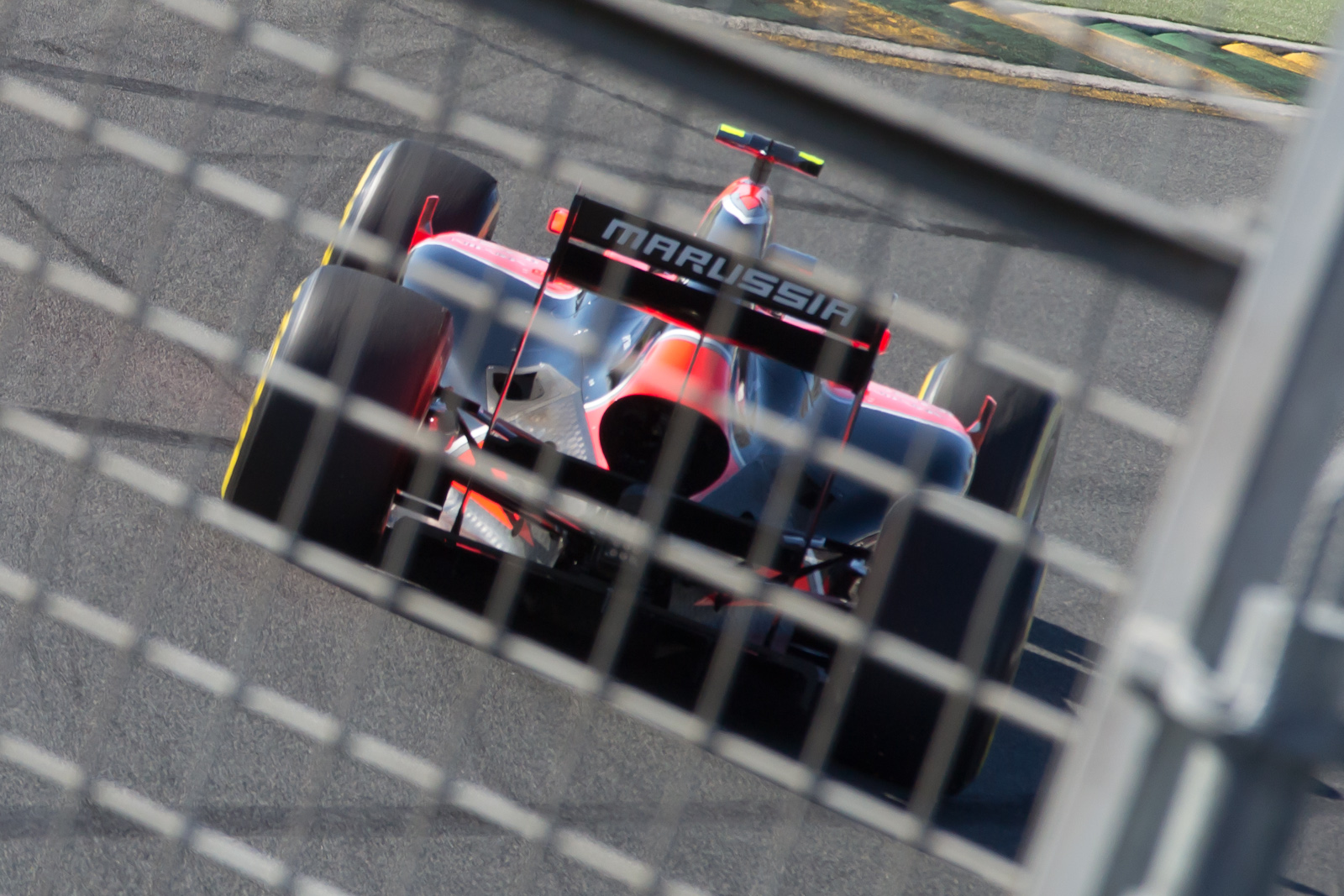
Marussia had not run either of their cars prior to the season; Charles Pic (pictured) made his first Formula One start in Australia.

HRT experienced problems with the #22 chassis to be driven by Pedro de la Rosa on Thursday. Having completed a shakedown of the car to be driven by Narain Karthikeyan in Barcelona just two weeks before the Australian Grand Prix, the team were unable to complete work on de la Rosa's car in time for scrutineering on Thursday afternoon. The team requested a delay to the scrutineering process, with the FIA agreeing and allowing HRT until 11 am local time to work on the car before presenting it to race stewards. The team ultimately passed scrutineering, allowing de la Rosa to take part in practice and the race, but they failed to have the car ready on time to take part in the first session.

Several drivers made their Formula One debut along with others taking part in their first Australian Grand Prix as full-time drivers. The French duo of Charles Pic and Jean-Éric Vergne made their Formula One debut driving for Marussia and Toro Rosso respectively. While Swiss-born Frenchman Romain Grosjean and Perth-born Australian Daniel Ricciardo came to Australia for the first time as full-time drivers for Lotus and Toro Rosso respectively, Grosjean had last raced in Abu Dhabi for the Renault F1 team in 2009 as teammate to Fernando Alonso. Ricciardo had never raced at his home Grand Prix.

Tyre supplier Pirelli brought its white-banded medium compound tyre as the harder "prime" tyre and the yellow-banded soft compound as the softer "option" compound, whereas the previous year the "prime" compound was the silver-banded hard compound tyre.

=== Free practice ===
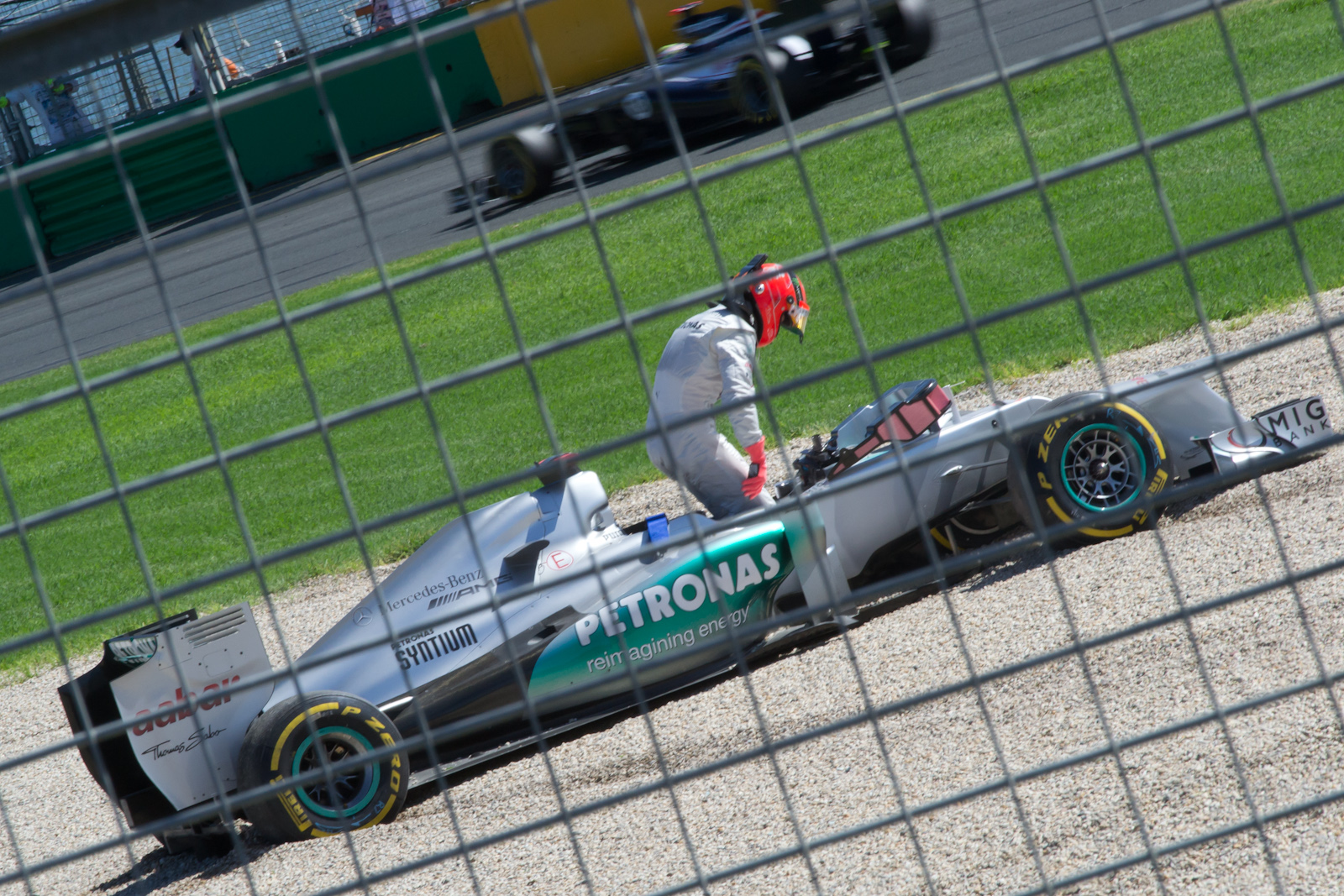
Michael Schumacher spun off at Turn 9 in the final practice session.

The first hour of the first practice session saw very little running, as the circuit was considered too wet for slick tyres, but too dry for intermediates. Consequently, most drivers only completed installation laps in the first hour, before emerging later in the session once a dry line began to appear. Kamui Kobayashi and the Mercedes pair of Nico Rosberg and Michael Schumacher set the pace, which was briefly interrupted by Karthikeyan's HRT cutting out on the approach to Turn 13, the engine automatically shutting itself off when the oil overheated. With de la Rosa's car not yet ready to take to the circuit, HRT finished the session without recording a single lap time. On his return to Formula One, Kimi Räikkönen experienced technical problems that limited him to just eight laps – later described by team personnel as making adjustments to the steering rack – while Felipe Massa spun out at Turn 9. Jenson Button finished the session fastest, with a late lap from Lewis Hamilton enough for second, and Schumacher half a second slower in third. Reigning World Champion Sebastian Vettel ultimately finished the session eleventh overall.

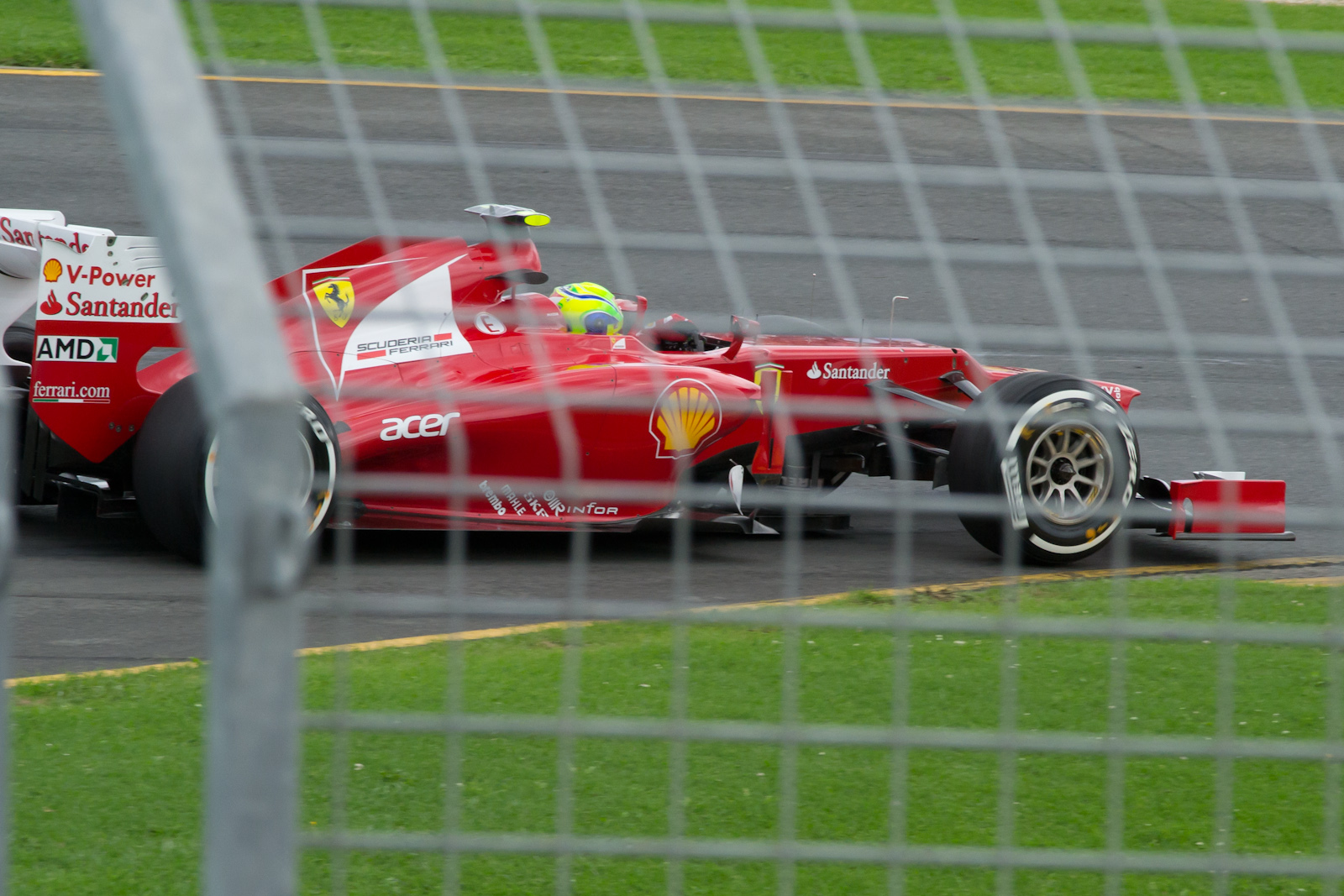
Felipe Massa was one of the drivers to spin into the gravel during the free practice sessions

Rain between the first and second session meant that the circuit was declared wet at the start of the second Friday session, with the water washing away the rubber than had been laid down by the first session and support events. The Scuderia Toro Rosso drivers were the first out, gathering data on the performance on wet tyres. A dry line began to appear after forty minutes, and it was Sergio Pérez who set the first representative time of the day. The final fifteen minutes of the session were dominated by drivers running on the soft tyres, with Michael Schumacher besting Nico Hülkenberg's fastest time by one tenth of a second on his final lap. Several drivers, including Heikki Kovalainen, Mark Webber and Pastor Maldonado went off the circuit, but the session passed without interruption. Kamui Kobayashi spun at the final corner and narrowly avoided the wall, whilst Narain Karthikeyan once again came to a halt on the circuit, this time at Turn 6 after the session had ended. With the team having successfully completed his car in time for the second session, Pedro de la Rosa was further paralysed by hydraulics issues.

The third session was warm and sunny (21 °C air temp, 29 °C track temp) and stayed much the same for the remainder of the weekend, allowing for significant running by all teams. Nico Rosberg and Michael Schumacher were once again the early leaders before Romain Grosjean set the fastest time in the final twenty minutes, only to be surpassed by Lewis Hamilton in the final minute. There was much attention given to Red Bull Racing, following team principal Christian Horner's claims that the team had not done any qualifying simulations. Their plans were thrown into disarray when Sebastian Vettel spun off at Turn 5 shortly after switching to soft tyres, and Mark Webber's fastest lap was ruined when Michael Schumacher spun off at Turn 9. Pedro de la Rosa managed to set his first timed lap of the weekend, but was forced to return to the pits with power steering problems. Projected lap times at the end of the session suggested that HRT would fail to qualify for the race for the second consecutive year.

=== Qualifying ===
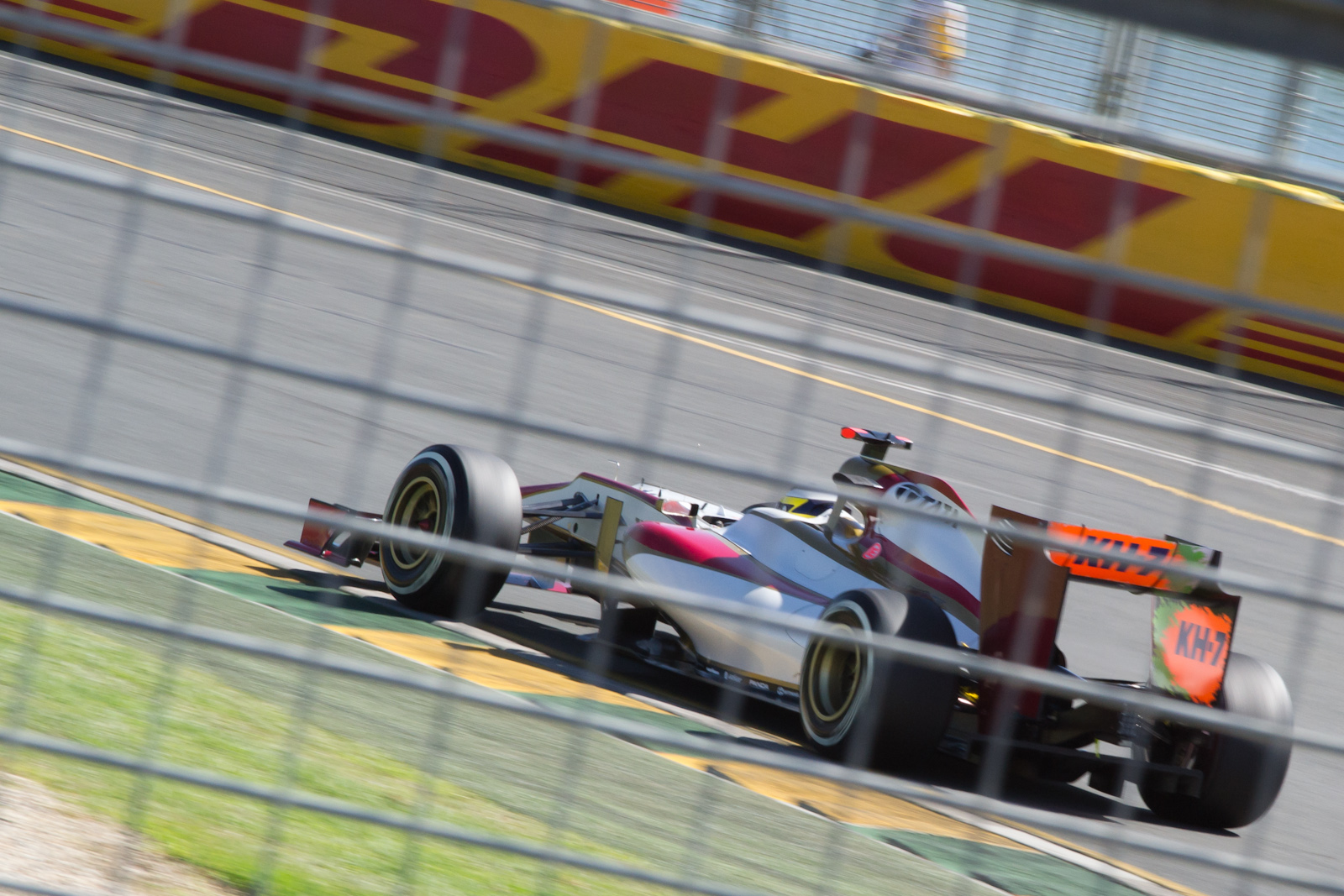
HRT failed to qualify either car for the race; Pedro de la Rosa (pictured) and Narain Karthikeyan were both over one second beyond the 107% cut-off time.

As a result of a six-car pile-up in a V8 Supercars support race held shortly after FP3, the exit of Turn 3 was covered with sand and fire-retardant foam. The accident resulted in a twenty-five-minute delay to the restart of the race, and although commentators noted that the cars would move the debris off the racing line, the shortened race format meant that sand was still visible on the circuit at the start of qualifying.

The first qualifying period was marked by heavy traffic, with several drivers cited for blocking. Chief among them was Narain Karthikeyan, who impeded other, faster cars on three separate occasions. The expected running order was soon shaken up as the session ended with Kamui Kobayashi fastest ahead of Jean-Éric Vergne and Sergio Pérez. Felipe Massa was in danger of being eliminated until a late lap secured his place in Q2. When the chequered flag fell, it was Kimi Räikkönen who found himself in eighteenth place and eliminated from qualifying. Räikkönen ran wide on the exit of Turn 12, glancing the sandtrap and compromising his final flying lap. Heikki Kovalainen and Vitaly Petrov finished in nineteenth and twentieth respectively, ahead of Marussia drivers Timo Glock and Charles Pic, both of whom were comfortably inside the 107% margin. The HRTs of Pedro de la Rosa and Karthikeyan were not, however; de la Rosa was 1.2 seconds away from the cut-off, while Karthikeyan was 1.4 seconds short.

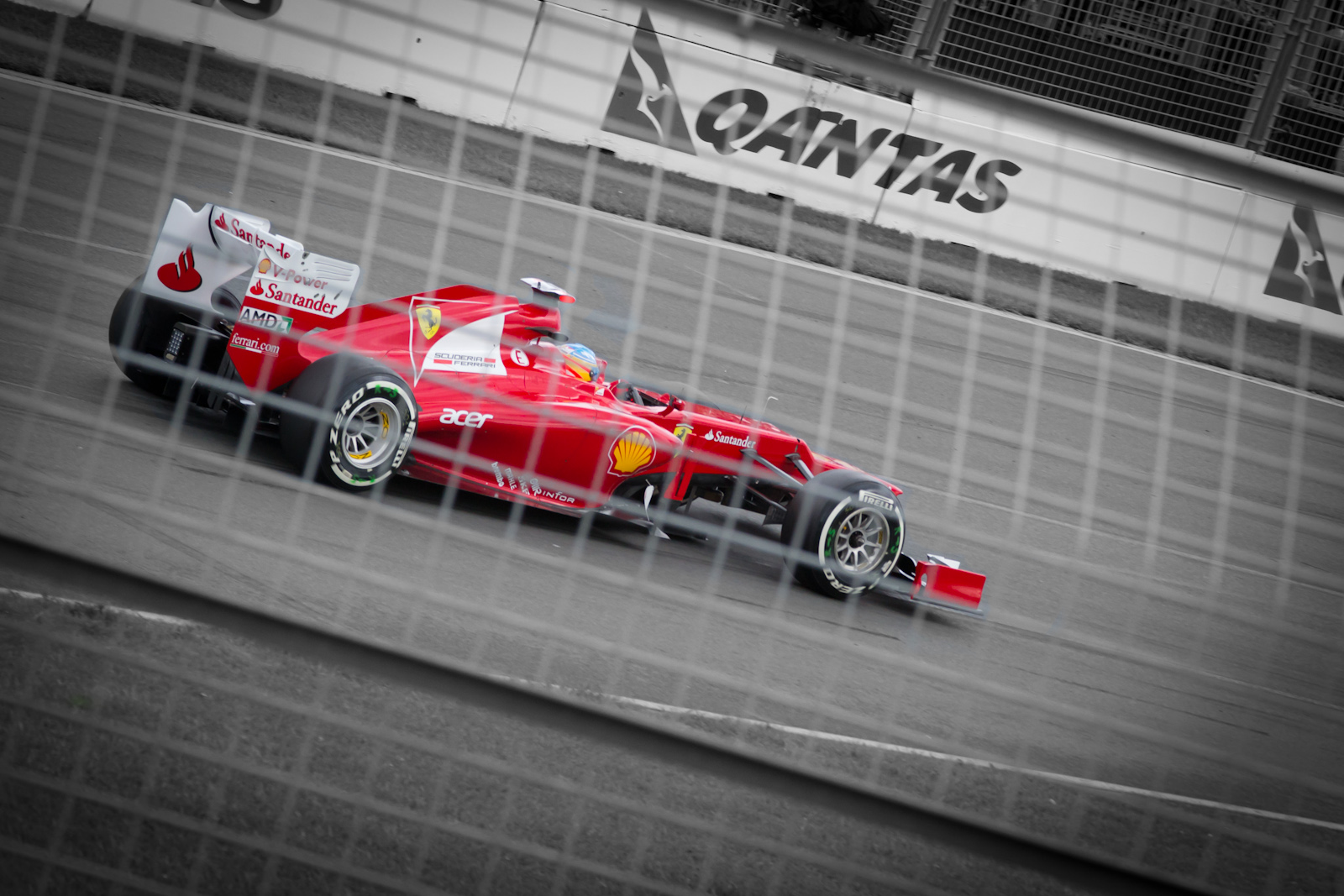
Fernando Alonso was eliminated in the second part of qualifying after spinning into the gravel at Turn 1. He qualified 12th behind the two Ferrari-powered Toro Rosso cars of Daniel Ricciardo and Jean-Éric Vergne.

The second period was marked by a second shock elimination, the Ferrari of Fernando Alonso. Five minutes into the period, Alonso crossed the outer edge of the circuit in the braking zone for the first turn and spun into the gravel. As he was unable to return his car to the circuit under its own power, he was prevented from taking any further part in the session. Consequently, the session was red flagged for approximately four minutes while his car was removed; eight minutes and twenty-two seconds remained on the clock for the session. He had been placed third at the time, but gradually fell down the order and was eliminated, ultimately qualifying in twelfth behind Vergne. Felipe Massa in the sole remaining Ferrari could do no better than sixteenth, culminating in Ferrari's first failure to advance at least one car to Q3 (in a dry qualifying session) since the 2009 Abu Dhabi Grand Prix. Conversely, Daniel Ricciardo and Romain Grosjean both reached Q3 for the first time in their respective careers. Despite setting the early pace in Q1, Kamui Kobayashi was unable to duplicate his time and finished thirteenth, ahead of Bruno Senna and Paul di Resta in fifteenth. Kobayashi's teammate Pérez did not set a time during the period owing to a gearbox fault, and so finished the session in seventeenth. At the conclusion of Q2, Rosberg set the fastest time of the weekend so far to lead an all Mercedes powered top four with Schumacher, Hamilton and Button following.

The final period began with Rosberg and Schumacher attempting to set a time on used soft tyres. Rosberg made an early mistake, and while Schumacher briefly held provisional pole, he was soon unseated by Hamilton. Hamilton's time, the first and only lap of the weekend under one minute and twenty-five seconds, would remain unchallenged for the remainder of the period, despite a late effort from teammate Jenson Button. Button ultimately finished a tenth of a second behind Hamilton, locking out the front row of the grid; the result was the first time since the 1995 Australian Grand Prix that two British drivers occupied the front row of the grid, and the first time since the 2010 Italian Grand Prix in which a Red Bull car failed to qualify on the front row of the grid. Schumacher's second flying lap was set on fresh rubber, and while he initially looked set to take third place, he had to settle for fourth after a surprise lap from Romain Grosjean placed the Lotus driver behind Button. Mark Webber qualified fifth ahead of reigning World Champion Sebastian Vettel, who deliberately left his pit garage last so as to set the final time of the session, a habit he developed during the 2011 season. However, his final flying lap was not enough for anything more than sixth place, eight-tenths of a second behind Hamilton. After making a mistake on his first flying lap, Rosberg made a second error while running on fresh tyres, and qualified seventh, with Pastor Maldonado in eighth and Nico Hülkenberg in ninth. Daniel Ricciardo finished tenth overall, having elected not to complete a timed lap.

=== Post-qualifying ===
Both HRT cars failed to qualify within 107% of the fastest time set in Q1. Consequently, both cars failed to qualify for the race. Despite team principal Luis Pérez-Sala's prediction that the team would be unlikely to qualify for the race (and that they may not be able to qualify for the Malaysian Grand Prix), the team requested a special dispensation to race from the stewards on the grounds that, as both cars were not fully prepared to take part in the Grand Prix until the final practice session, the times set during qualifying were not fully representative of the car's ability to qualify for the race. The FIA later confirmed that neither car would be granted permission to start the race, meaning that the team failed to qualify for the Australian Grand Prix for the second consecutive year. As of 2026, this is the last occasion a driver failed to qualify for a Formula One race.

Several drivers, including Narain Karthikeyan, Fernando Alonso and Daniel Ricciardo were called before the stewards to answer to charges of blocking during the first qualifying period. However, no action was taken against any driver.

Despite Mercedes' rear wing concept being declared legal on Thursday, representatives from Red Bull Racing and Lotus F1 approached the race stewards and requested that the FIA review the original verdict after qualifying, claiming that the front wing system was in violation of Articles 3.15 and 3.18, which govern the use of DRS and driver-operated aerodynamic devices.

=== Race ===
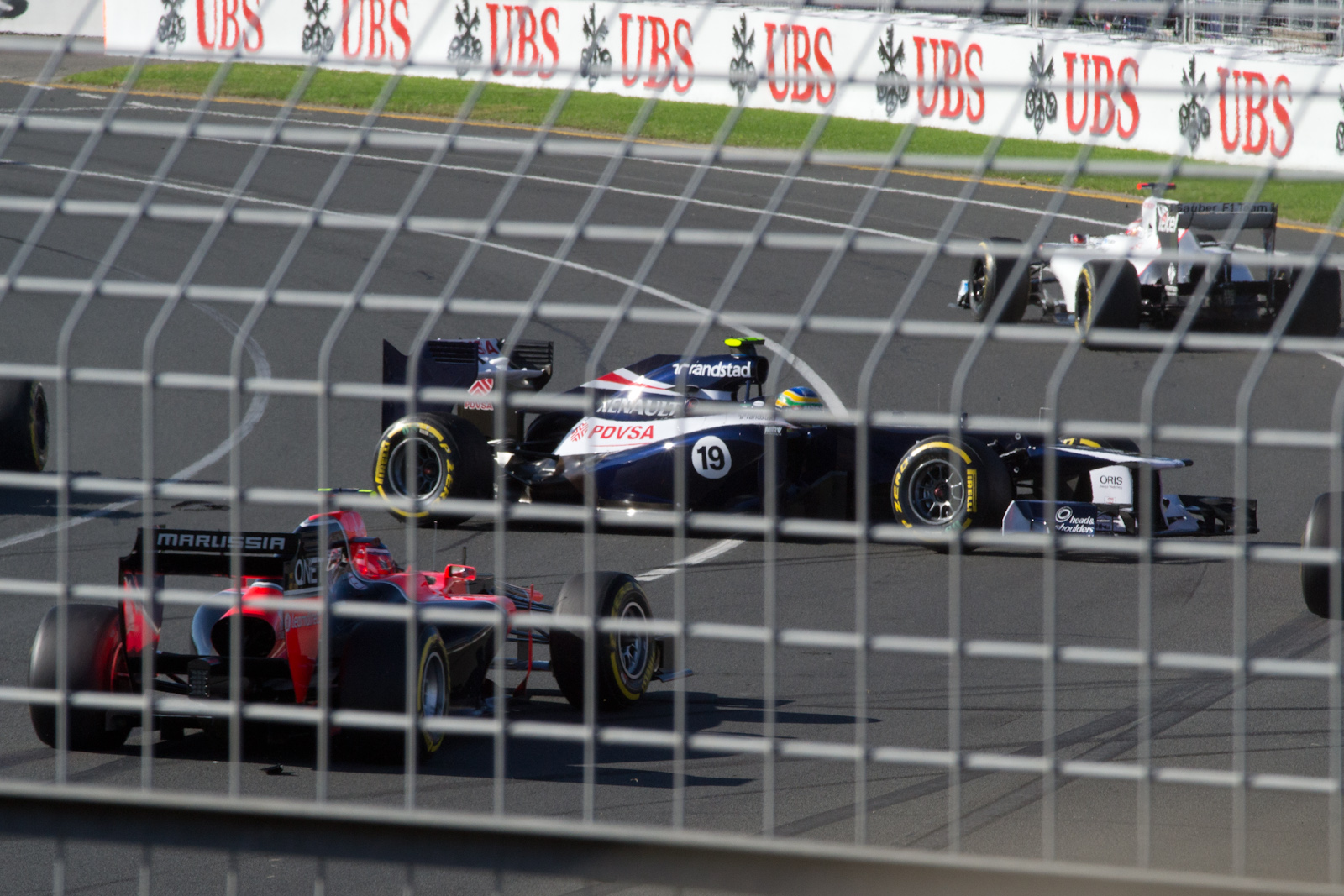
Bruno Senna was spun after a collision with Daniel Ricciardo at the first corner.

Jenson Button made the better start away from the line, leading the field into the first corner. Lewis Hamilton slotted in behind him in second place. Romain Grosjean was overwhelmed at the first corner and fell from third to sixth, while Mark Webber fell down the order after making contact and getting sandwiched in between Jean-Éric Vergne and Nico Hülkenberg. The contact was heavy enough to end Hülkenberg's race. Additionally, at the first corner Sergio Pérez, after gaining several positions from at the start, was unable to avoid the rear wing of his Sauber teammate, Kamui Kobayashi, leaving Kobayashi's rear wing damaged for the remainder of the race. Meanwhile, Bruno Senna's Williams was turned sideways with two wheels airborne above Daniel Ricciardo's front wing, as a consequence both cars pitted on lap 1 leaving them effectively last in 19th and 20th respectively. Michael Schumacher and Nico Rosberg settled into third and fourth before Rosberg was passed by Vettel. Grosjean made contact with Pastor Maldonado at Turn 13, the impact snapping Grosjean's steering arm and retiring the French driver on the spot. Fernando Alonso clawed his way up from twelfth to seventh. The minor placing benefited from the retirement of Schumacher on lap 10, when he ran wide across the run-off outside Turn 1 as he tried to nurse a gearbox problem, and he was seen limping down the approach to Turn 3. This left Vettel, who had been quickly catching Schumacher, in third place behind the two McLarens.

The first round of stops began with Felipe Massa on lap 14, the Ferrari driver complaining of a loss of grip in his rear tyres. Several other drivers pitted around the same time, foreshadowing a switch to a three-stop strategy. Meanwhile, Sergio Pérez went in the opposite direction; having started the race on the harder prime tyre, the Mexican driver stayed out longer than anyone else, once again aiming for the one-stop strategy he had used throughout the 2011 season. Button briefly yielded the race lead to Lewis Hamilton, but immediately took it back when Hamilton pitted on the very next lap. Hamilton's stop was significant as he emerged behind Pérez, who was matching Button's pace despite his older and harder tyres. This would ultimately leave Hamilton vulnerable to the third-placed Vettel. A radio transmission from Räikkönen broadcast where he asked why the blue light was flashing on his steering wheel. There was actually a problem with the computer program controlling the blue flags during the race. Jenson Button was getting some as well, and his race engineer confirmed that there was a slight malfunction on the race organizer's end.

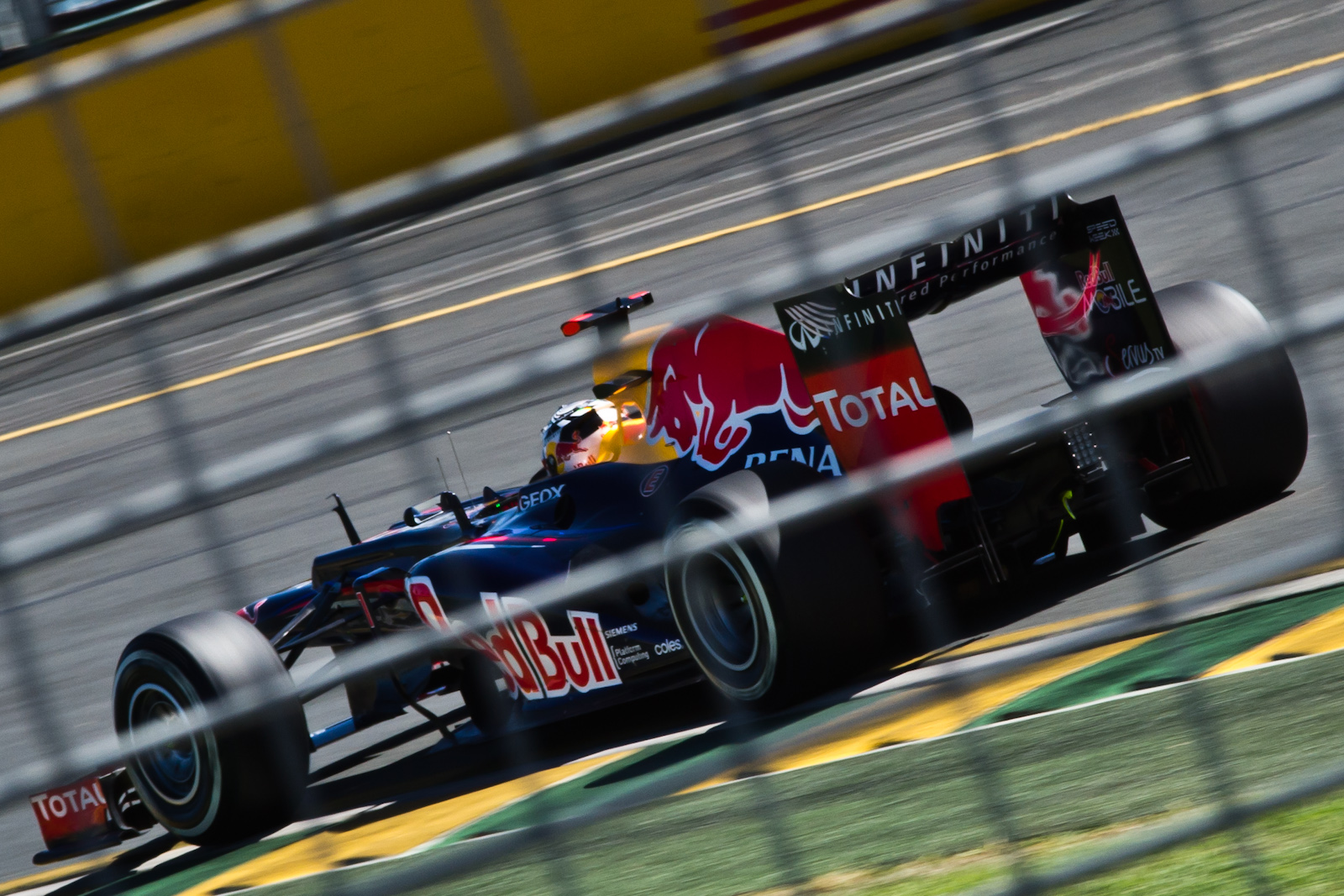
Sebastian Vettel gained four places to finish second after overtaking Lewis Hamilton during the safety car phase.

Due to a steering problem, Vitaly Petrov retired his Caterham on the start/finish straight beside the pit wall. The position of the car was dangerous so the safety car was deployed on lap 37 to allow a truck to recover it. This led to a round of pit stops which, significantly, allowed Vettel to take second place from Hamilton. With the new rules allowing lapped cars to unlap themselves, Button now had to contend with Vettel, Hamilton, Webber and Alonso behind him. With the safety car returning to the pits after lap 41, Button opened up a three-second gap at the restart. Hamilton was unable to overtake Vettel for second place, and fell into the clutches of Webber in fourth. Pastor Maldonado harried Alonso for fifth, with a radio transmission from the Ferrari pit revealing that Alonso's tyres were quickly degrading. Maldonado was unable to find a way past Alonso, and ultimately crashed out on the final lap when he applied too much throttle too soon while still on the astroturf through the apex of turn 7. As a result of pushing hard in pursuit of Alonso and ten world championship points, his Williams was forced into a spin which he could not correct. He made heavy contact with the wall, but was not injured, and was ultimately classified thirteenth as he had completed 90% of the race distance.

Further down the order, Felipe Massa made contact with Bruno Senna at Turn 3, with the Ferrari and Williams continuing on for some distance as they tried to untangle themselves from one another. Both cars developed punctures, and retired from the race as a result. Senna was able to remain out on the circuit long enough to complete 90% of the race distance, and he was classified sixteenth as a result.

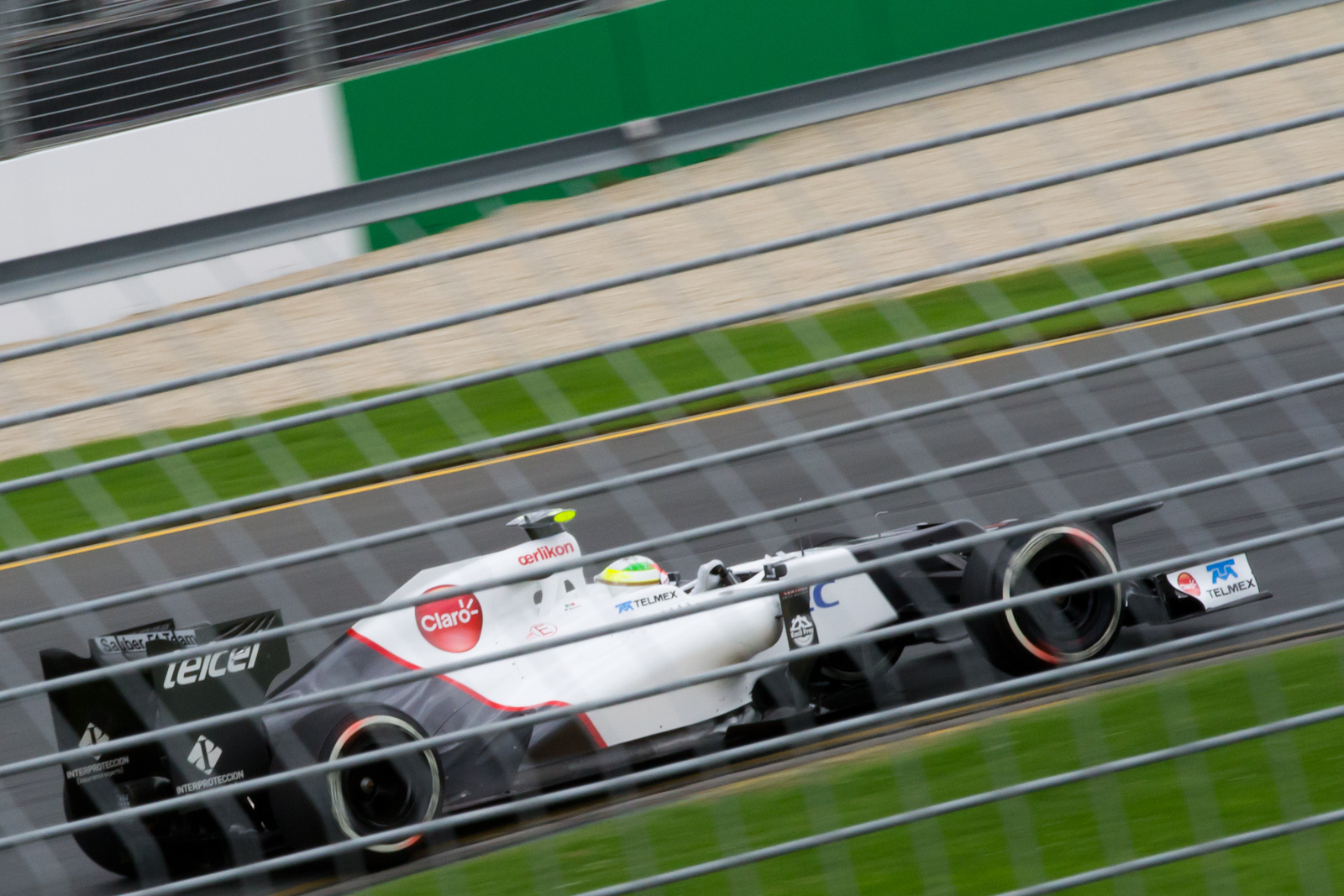
Sergio Pérez was the only driver to attempt a one-stop strategy; he finished eighth, having started from the back of the grid.

Jenson Button went on to win the race, his third at the Albert Park Circuit in four years. Vettel crossed the line second, two seconds behind Button, while Hamilton held Webber off long enough to finish third. Webber crossed the line fourth, his best result at his home Grand Prix. Maldonado's accident meant that Fernando Alonso finished the race a lonely fifth, with Kamui Kobayashi scoring eight points for sixth place.

Going into the final lap of the race, Pérez in seventh led Rosberg ahead of Räikkönen – who had recovered from seventeenth on the grid to be running ninth – and Jean-Éric Vergne, Daniel Ricciardo and Paul di Resta. Rosberg made contact with Pérez on the approach to the fast chicane at turns 11 and 12, allowing Räikkönen to overtake both of them. Vergne made a mistake at turn 13, opening the door for di Resta and Ricciardo to pass him, and the two fought over ninth place in a fierce sprint to the line. In fact, the racing was so unpredictable 8th to 11th position was separated by less than 0.4s. Räikkönen finished seventh ahead of Pérez, who managed to complete the race with only a single pitstop, matching his feat from the previous year. Ricciardo finished ninth ahead of di Resta in tenth, which left Vergne to settle for eleventh. Rosberg, who had a left rear puncture from his earlier contact with Pérez, limped to the line in twelfth, twenty seconds behind Vergne. Maldonado's accident left him thirteenth, with Timo Glock in the sole surviving Marussia in fourteenth and one lap down on the leader.

== Classification ==
=== Qualifying ===
Pos.	No.	Driver	Constructor	Q1	Q2	Q3	Grid
1	4	(United Kingdom) Lewis Hamilton	McLaren-Mercedes	1:26.800	1:25.626	1:24.922	1
2	3	(United Kingdom) Jenson Button	McLaren-Mercedes	1:26.832	1:25.663	1:25.074	2
3	10	(France) Romain Grosjean	Lotus-Renault	1:26.498	1:25.845	1:25.302	3
4	7	(Germany) Michael Schumacher	Mercedes	1:26.586	1:25.571	1:25.336	4
5	2	(Australia) Mark Webber	Red Bull-Renault	1:27.117	1:26.297	1:25.651	5
6	1	(Germany) Sebastian Vettel	Red Bull-Renault	1:26.773	1:25.982	1:25.668	6
7	8	(Germany) Nico Rosberg	Mercedes	1:26.763	1:25.469	1:25.686	7
8	18	(Venezuela) Pastor Maldonado	Williams-Renault	1:26.803	1:26.206	1:25.908	8
9	12	(Germany) Nico Hülkenberg	Force India-Mercedes	1:27.464	1:26.314	1:26.451	9
10	16	(Australia) Daniel Ricciardo	Toro Rosso-Ferrari	1:27.024	1:26.319	no time	10
11	17	(France) Jean-Éric Vergne	Toro Rosso-Ferrari	1:26.493	1:26.429		11
12	5	(Spain) Fernando Alonso	Ferrari	1:26.688	1:26.494		12
13	14	(Japan) Kamui Kobayashi	Sauber-Ferrari	1:26.182	1:26.590		13
14	19	(Brazil) Bruno Senna	Williams-Renault	1:27.004	1:26.663		14
15	11	(United Kingdom) Paul di Resta	Force India-Mercedes	1:27.469	1:27.086		15
16	6	(Brazil) Felipe Massa	Ferrari	1:27.633	1:27.497		16
17	15	(Mexico) Sergio Pérez	Sauber-Ferrari	1:26.596	no time		22^{1}
18	9	(Finland) Kimi Räikkönen	Lotus-Renault	1:27.758			17
19	20	(Finland) Heikki Kovalainen	Caterham-Renault	1:28.679			18
20	21	(Russia) Vitaly Petrov	Caterham-Renault	1:29.018			19
21	24	(Germany) Timo Glock	Marussia-Cosworth	1:30.923			20
22	25	(France) Charles Pic	Marussia-Cosworth	1:31.670			21
107% time: 1:32.214
—	22	(Spain) Pedro de la Rosa	HRT-Cosworth	1:33.495			DNQ^{2}
—	23	(India) Narain Karthikeyan	HRT-Cosworth	1:33.643			DNQ^{2}

Notes

- ^1 — Sergio Pérez took a five-place grid penalty for a gearbox change.
- ^2 — Pedro de la Rosa and Narain Karthikeyan failed to set a lap time within 107% of the fastest time recorded in Q1. They were not given permission to start the race by the stewards. As a result, both cars failed to qualify for the race.

=== Race ===
Pos.	No.	Driver	Constructor	Laps	Time/Retired	Grid	Points
1	3	(United Kingdom) Jenson Button	McLaren-Mercedes	58	1:34:09.565	2	25
2	1	(Germany) Sebastian Vettel	Red Bull-Renault	58	+2.139	6	18
3	4	(United Kingdom) Lewis Hamilton	McLaren-Mercedes	58	+4.075	1	15
4	2	(Australia) Mark Webber	Red Bull-Renault	58	+4.547	5	12
5	5	(Spain) Fernando Alonso	Ferrari	58	+21.565	12	10
6	14	(Japan) Kamui Kobayashi	Sauber-Ferrari	58	+36.766	13	8
7	9	(Finland) Kimi Räikkönen	Lotus-Renault	58	+38.014	17	6
8	15	(Mexico) Sergio Pérez	Sauber-Ferrari	58	+39.458	22	4
9	16	(Australia) Daniel Ricciardo	Toro Rosso-Ferrari	58	+39.556	10	2
10	11	(United Kingdom) Paul di Resta	Force India-Mercedes	58	+39.737	15	1
11	17	(France) Jean-Éric Vergne	Toro Rosso-Ferrari	58	+39.848	11	
12	8	(Germany) Nico Rosberg	Mercedes	58	+57.642	7	
13	18	(Venezuela) Pastor Maldonado	Williams-Renault	57	Accident	8	
14	24	(Germany) Timo Glock	Marussia-Cosworth	57	+1 Lap	20	
15	25	(France) Charles Pic	Marussia-Cosworth	53	Oil pressure	21	
16	19	(Brazil) Bruno Senna	Williams-Renault	52	Collision damage	14	
Ret	6	(Brazil) Felipe Massa	Ferrari	46	Collision damage	16	
Ret	20	(Finland) Heikki Kovalainen	Caterham-Renault	38	Suspension	18	
Ret	21	(Russia) Vitaly Petrov	Caterham-Renault	34	Steering	19	
Ret	7	(Germany) Michael Schumacher	Mercedes	10	Gearbox	4	
Ret	10	(France) Romain Grosjean	Lotus-Renault	1	Collision	3	
Ret	12	(Germany) Nico Hülkenberg	Force India-Mercedes	0	Collision damage	9	
DNQ	22	(Spain) Pedro de la Rosa	HRT-Cosworth	-	Failed to reach 107% time	-	
DNQ	23	(India) Narain Karthikeyan	HRT-Cosworth	-	Failed to reach 107% time	-	

- Heikki Kovalainen was given a five-place grid penalty at the next race for overtaking cars on a restart prior to passing the safety car line.
- Both Pedro de la Rosa and Narain Karthikeyan failed to qualify within the 107% time and were not given permission by the stewards to start the race. As a result, they were not allowed to start or compete in the race.

== Championship standings after the race ==
Drivers' Championship standings

Pos.	Driver	Points
1	(United Kingdom) Jenson Button	25
2	(Germany) Sebastian Vettel	18
3	(United Kingdom) Lewis Hamilton	15
4	(Australia) Mark Webber	12
5	(Spain) Fernando Alonso	10

Constructors' Championship standings

Pos.	Constructor	Points
1	(United Kingdom) McLaren-Mercedes	40
2	(Austria) Red Bull-Renault	30
3	(Switzerland) Sauber-Ferrari	12
4	(Italy) Ferrari	10
5	(United Kingdom) Lotus-Renault	6

- Note: Only the top five positions are included for both sets of standings.

== See also ==
- 2012 V8 Supercars Albert Park Challenge

Previous race: 2011 Brazilian Grand Prix	FIA Formula One World Championship; 2012 season	Next race: 2012 Malaysian Grand Prix
Previous race: 2011 Australian Grand Prix	Australian Grand Prix	Next race: 2013 Australian Grand Prix
