= 2012 British Grand Prix =

Race 9 of 20 in the 2012 Formula One World Championship
← Previous race	Next race →
- Silverstone Circuit

Race details
- Date: 8 July 2012
- Official name: 2012 Formula 1 Santander British Grand Prix
- Location: Silverstone Circuit, Northamptonshire and Buckinghamshire, England
- Course: Permanent racing facility
- Course length: 5.891 km (3.660 mi)
- Distance: 52 laps, 306.198 km (190.263 miles)
- Weather: Dry; Air Temp 20 °C (68 °F); Track Temp 31 °C (88 °F)
- Attendance: 127,000 (Race Day)

Pole position
Driver	(Spain) Fernando Alonso	Ferrari
- Time: 1:51.746

Fastest lap
Driver	(Finland) Kimi Räikkönen	Lotus-Renault
- Time: 1:34.661 on lap 50

Podium
First	(Australia) Mark Webber	Red Bull-Renault
Second	(Spain) Fernando Alonso	Ferrari
Third	(Germany) Sebastian Vettel	Red Bull-Renault

The 2012 British Grand Prix (formally the 2012 Formula 1 Santander British Grand Prix) was a Formula One motor race that took place at the Silverstone Circuit in Northamptonshire and Buckinghamshire, England on 8 July 2012. It was the ninth round of the 2012 Formula One season, the 63rd time the event had been a round of the Formula One World Championship, and the 67th time it had been contested overall.

The 52-lap race was won by Red Bull driver Mark Webber, who took his second victory of the season. The Ferrari of Fernando Alonso, who started the race in pole position, finished 3.0 seconds behind Webber, in second. Webber's teammate, Sebastian Vettel, completed the podium by finishing in third position.

This would prove to be Webber's ninth and final career F1 victory. This was also the last victory for an Australian Formula One driver until Daniel Ricciardo's victory in the 2014 Canadian Grand Prix, Ricciardo having replaced Webber at Red Bull after the latter's retirement at the end of the 2013 season.

== Report ==
=== Background ===
Jean-Éric Vergne was given a ten-place grid penalty for the race after causing an avoidable collision with Heikki Kovalainen during the previous race. Kamui Kobayashi took a five-place grid penalty for the same offence, having caused an avoidable collision with Felipe Massa in Valencia.

After out-qualifying Toro Rosso drivers Vergne and Daniel Ricciardo in Valencia, Caterham announced plans to bring several upgrades for the CT-01 chassis to the race. Marussia joined Caterham in bringing significant updates to their car, which the Russian team described as their "first proper windtunnel-generated update" since abandoning their computational fluid dynamics-only approach at the start of the 2012 season.

Test driver María de Villota was involved in a serious accident while carrying out a straight-line aerodynamic test of the upgraded MR01 chassis in the week preceding the race at Duxford Aerodrome. She was removed from the car with life-threatening injuries, which included skull fractures and the loss of her right eye.

Like the 2011 British Grand Prix, tyre supplier Pirelli brought its silver-banded hard compound tyre as the harder "prime" tyre and the yellow-banded soft compound tyre as the softer "option" tyre.

Dani Clos replaced Narain Karthikeyan at HRT for the first practice session, having previously driven the car at the Spanish Grand Prix. Valtteri Bottas took Bruno Senna's seat at Williams, while Jules Bianchi drove Nico Hülkenberg's car for Force India and for the duration of the session.

=== Free Practice ===
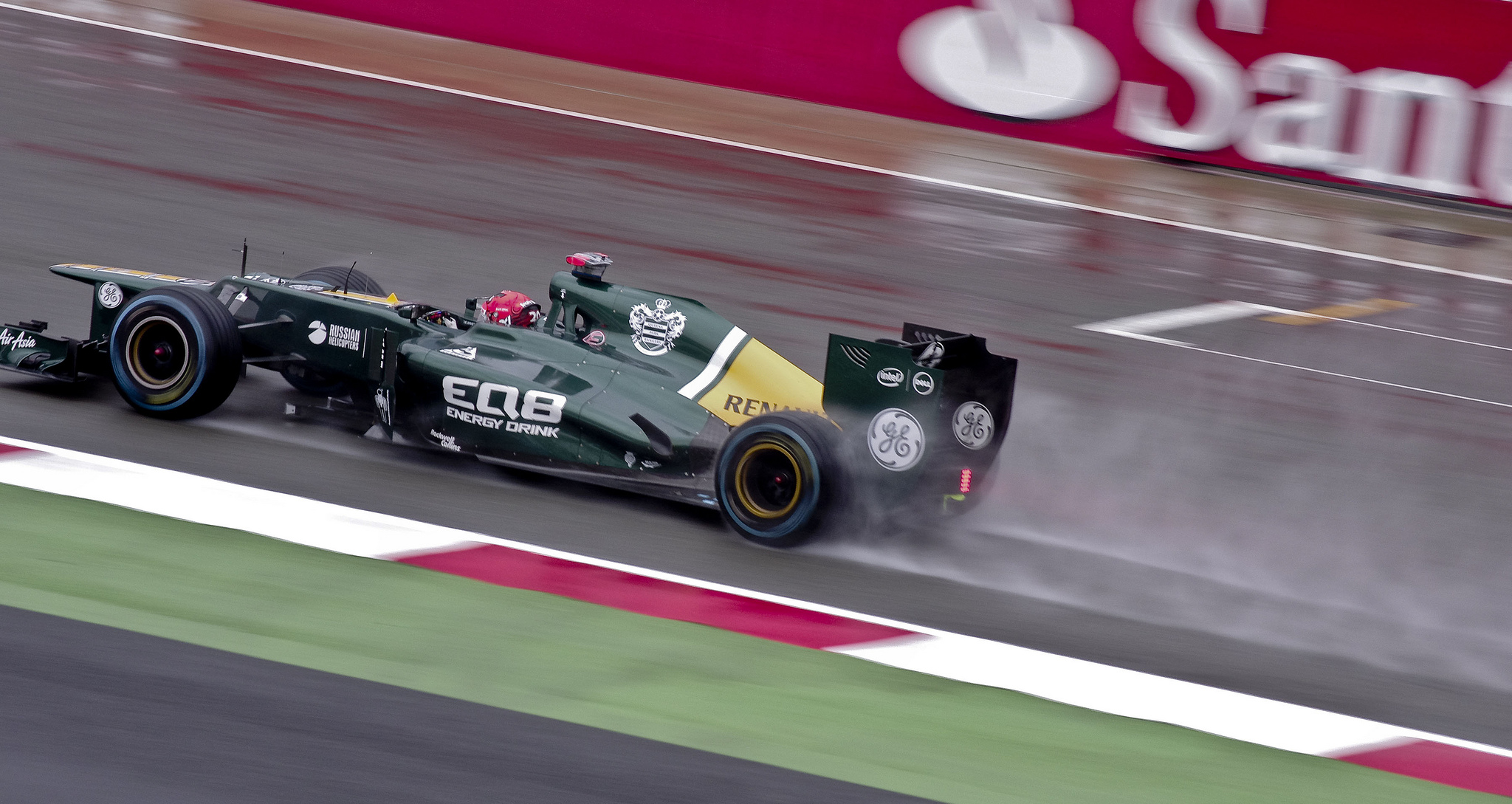
The wet conditions in Friday's practice sessions saw limited running.

The teams were due to test an "experimental" hard tyre compound developed by Pirelli during the first free practice with a view to introducing it as a racing tyre later in the season; however, wet conditions made this impossible. Romain Grosjean was the fastest driver in the first session, ahead of Daniel Ricciardo and Lewis Hamilton. Fernando Alonso and the Force Indias of Paul di Resta and Jules Bianchi elected not to set lap times in the face of the difficult conditions.

The second session was washed out as well and teams saw limited action as they tried to preserve their wet- and intermediate-compound tyres. Hamilton had the fastest time, leading Kamui Kobayashi and Michael Schumacher as Grosjean elected not to set a time. Bruno Senna brought out a red flag that resulted in a ten-minute stoppage when he hit a patch of standing water at Becketts, spinning and crashing heavily into the barriers. Fernando Alonso also encountered trouble, spinning and hitting the wall late in the session, but the Ferrari driver was able to return to the pits.

The third and final session was declared dry, but was run under the threat of rain and saw plenty of activity as the teams pushed hard to make up for lost time running in the wet on Friday. Charles Pic stopped on the circuit after twenty minutes, forcing the temporary suspension of the session while his car was removed. Pic later returned to the circuit, but stopped once again, and his car was removed by marshalls without forcing the session to be stopped. Alonso ended the session the fastest overall.

=== Qualifying ===
Qualifying started in wet conditions, and with the threat of more rain on the way, a queue of cars formed at the end of pit lane in the minutes before the session began. Once out, many drivers were instructed by their teams to keep going with their flying laps, even if they felt they had been impeded by a slower car because the rapidly evolving nature of the circuit meant that they could still set a fast lap time.

Jenson Button was eliminated in eighteenth position when he could not find clear track space. His final flying lap saw him set sector times that would have been fast enough to avoid elimination by over a second and a half, but a spin on the main straight by Timo Glock brought out yellow flags, prompting Button to back off, whereupon he was duly eliminated. Vitaly Petrov out-qualified teammate Heikki Kovalainen for the second time in 2012, with the Caterhams starting in eighteenth and nineteenth place once grid penalties had been applied. Despite his spin, Glock's fastest lap saw him start twentieth, ahead of both HRT drivers, with Pedro de la Rosa once again out-qualifying Narain Karthikeyan. Charles Pic failed to set a lap time within 107% of the fastest time in the session, set by Sebastian Vettel.

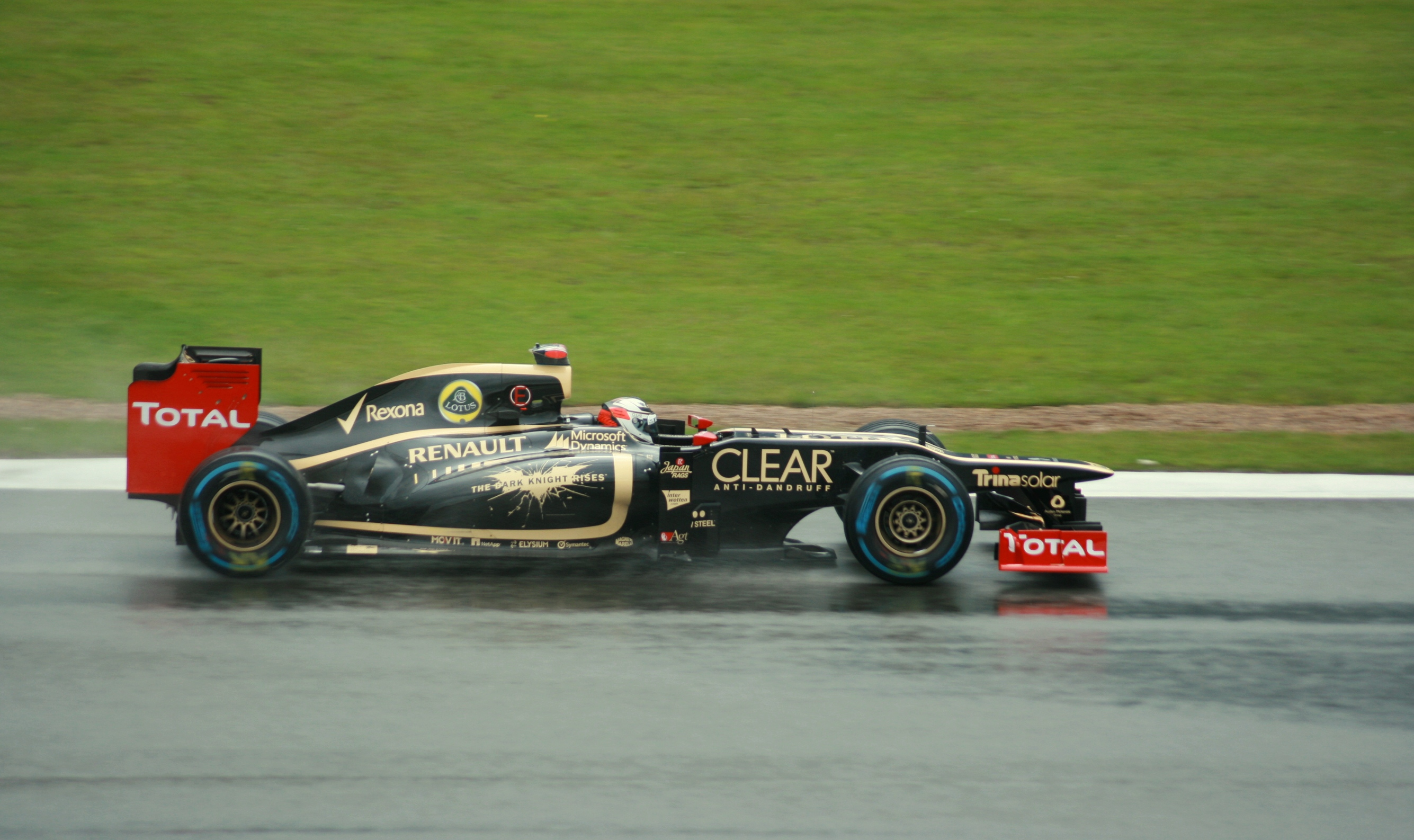
Kimi Räikkönen qualified his Lotus in sixth position.

The weather delivered on its promise of more rain, inundating the circuit ahead of Q2. The session was red-flagged with just over six minutes remaining in the session after four cars spun off within the space of a minute, and Sauber's Sergio Pérez at the top of the time sheets. The stoppage lasted for ninety-two minutes while race officials waited for the rain to stop and the circuit to clear. When the session re-opened, the seventeen drivers would have enough time left over for one set of flying laps, forcing them to choose between the intermediate and wet-weather compounds as the length of a lap in the wet meant that the drivers would not have enough time to pit and change tyres if they made the wrong choice.

Pérez chose the intermediate compound which quickly proved to be the wrong choice as he rapidly plummeted down the order, and finished slowest. He would start the race fifteenth after penalties were applied. Paul di Resta's final lap gave him a provisional start in Q3, but he was eliminated in the final moments of the session and started eleventh. Kamui Kobayashi was twelfth, but dropped to seventeenth when his penalty from Valencia was applied. Nico Rosberg and Daniel Ricciardo finished thirteenth and fourteenth, ahead of Bruno Senna who admitted to being "too conservative" in qualifying. Jean-Éric Vergne qualified sixteenth, but was moved to the back of the grid once his penalty was applied. Romain Grosjean made it through to Q3, but spun at the end of the period at the Vale chicane, and took no further part in the session.

Q3 was fought between the Ferraris, Red Bulls and Michael Schumacher's Mercedes. Fernando Alonso and Felipe Massa quickly locked out the front row of the grid, until late laps from Mark Webber and Sebastian Vettel left the Red Bull cars first and second. Massa was unable to improve his lap time and finished fifth, while Schumacher pushed Webber off pole. Webber reclaimed it with his next lap, only to lose it in turn to Alonso on the Spaniard's final lap of the session. Kimi Räikkönen, the last driver to set a time, finished sixth, ahead of Pastor Maldonado and Lewis Hamilton. Nico Hülkenberg was ninth, which became fourteenth when he took a five-place grid penalty for a gearbox change.

=== Race ===
An engine failure on Vitaly Petrov's Caterham on his way round to the grid meant he had to return to the pits and retire the car before the race had even begun. When it did, however, it was polesitter Alonso who maintained his lead into the first corner. Webber and Schumacher followed him round in their same positions, but Vettel fell prey to Massa and Räikkönen, before quickly getting back past the Finn. Paul di Resta, in tenth place at the time, suffered a puncture as a result of his right rear tyre coming into contact with Romain Grosjean's front wing at the start of the Wellington straight. Di Resta spun and retired from the damage on the following lap whilst Grosjean pitted on the third lap to replace his front wing and change tyres after his impaired front wing was costing him places.

Later on in the race, Sergio Pérez and Pastor Maldonado, had an incident at Brooklands at the end of the Wellington Straight. Maldonado tried to overtake Pérez on the inside of the corner under braking, whilst Pérez was defending on the inside line Maldonado's front wing clipped Pérez's car and sent both of them into a spin; the result of this would be Pérez retiring from the race and Maldonado having to make an unscheduled pit stop to repair damage to his front wing. This would be a disaster for Maldonado's strategy in the race because a lap earlier, he pitted for new tyres, Maldonado would later finish 16th in the race.

At the start of lap 50, Mark Webber was closing in on race leader Fernando Alonso, with Vettel closely behind his teammate in 3rd place. Webber was faster than Alonso due to his tyres being worn more than Webber's, but then with 3 laps to go, Webber was within a second of Alonso's car; this would mean he was eligible to use DRS in the allocated DRS zone on the Wellington Straight which would give him extra speed. Alonso knew he was slower than Webber so he took the inside line as Webber passed Alonso for the lead in the race, Alonso tried to attack him in the next few corners. Now Vettel would try and close up on Alonso.

When the chequered flag finally fell, Mark Webber won his second British Grand Prix, following up his victory in 2010. Alonso placed 2nd, and Vettel not having the pace to catch Alonso came in 3rd. Felipe Massa finished 5 seconds behind Vettel, Romain Grosjean recovered from the first lap incident to finish sixth, behind his teammate Kimi Räikkönen. The other points scorers were Schumacher, Hamilton, Senna, and Jenson Button in 10th.

=== Post-race ===
Pastor Maldonado received a €10,000 fine for the incident with Sergio Pérez. Kamui Kobayashi received a €25,000 fine for a poorly controlled pit entry in which he knocked down some of his crew; the incident was described by the stewards as a 'very dangerous move which had potentially serious implications'.

A new podium design and interview format was introduced at this Grand Prix; instead of Webber, Alonso, and Vettel proceeding to the interview room in the media centre, Jackie Stewart conducted the televised interview on the podium, allowing the drivers to address the crowd directly. The drivers then proceeded to the interview room for the press conference with assembled media. This form of post-race interviewing was used in every race, with alternating hosts, until the 2018 Chinese Grand Prix.

As a consequence of the race, Webber narrowed Alonso's lead in the drivers' standings to 13 points. Webber himself was 16 points ahead of Vettel, who had moved ahead of Hamilton into third in the standings on 100 points. Red Bull extended their lead in the constructors' standings to 64 points. Ferrari moved up from fourth place to second whilst McLaren did the reverse and Lotus stayed in third position. All three teams stayed within 10 points of each other.

== Classification ==
=== Qualifying ===
Pos.	No.	Driver	Constructor	Part 1	Part 2	Part 3	Grid
1	5	(Spain) Fernando Alonso	Ferrari	1:46.515	1:56.921	1:51.746	1
2	2	(Australia) Mark Webber	Red Bull-Renault	1:47.276	1:55.898	1:51.793	2
3	7	(Germany) Michael Schumacher	Mercedes	1:46.571	1:55.799	1:52.020	3
4	1	(Germany) Sebastian Vettel	Red Bull-Renault	1:46.279	1:56.931	1:52.199	4
5	6	(Brazil) Felipe Massa	Ferrari	1:47.401	1:56.388	1:53.065	5
6	9	(Finland) Kimi Räikkönen	Lotus-Renault	1:47.309	1:56.469	1:53.290	6
7	18	(Venezuela) Pastor Maldonado	Williams-Renault	1:46.449	1:56.802	1:53.539	7
8	4	(United Kingdom) Lewis Hamilton	McLaren-Mercedes	1:47.433	1:54.897	1:53.543	8
9	12	(Germany) Nico Hülkenberg	Force India-Mercedes	1:46.334	1:55.556	1:54.382	14^{1}
10	10	(France) Romain Grosjean	Lotus-Renault	1:47.043	1:56.388	no time	9
11	11	(United Kingdom) Paul di Resta	Force India-Mercedes	1:47.582	1:57.009		10
12	14	(Japan) Kamui Kobayashi	Sauber-Ferrari	1:46.649	1:57.071		17^{2}
13	8	(Germany) Nico Rosberg	Mercedes	1:47.724	1:57.108		11
14	16	(Australia) Daniel Ricciardo	Toro Rosso-Ferrari	1:47.266	1:57.132		12
15	19	(Brazil) Bruno Senna	Williams-Renault	1:47.105	1:57.426		13
16	17	(France) Jean-Éric Vergne	Toro Rosso-Ferrari	1:47.705	1:57.719		23^{3}
17	15	(Mexico) Sergio Pérez	Sauber-Ferrari	1:46.494	1:57.895		15
18	3	(United Kingdom) Jenson Button	McLaren-Mercedes	1:48.044			16
19	21	(Russia) Vitaly Petrov	Caterham-Renault	1:49.027			18
20	20	(Finland) Heikki Kovalainen	Caterham-Renault	1:49.477			19
21	24	(Germany) Timo Glock	Marussia-Cosworth	1:51.618			20
22	22	(Spain) Pedro de la Rosa	HRT-Cosworth	1:52.742			21
23	23	(India) Narain Karthikeyan	HRT-Cosworth	1:53.040			22
107% time: 1:53.718
24	25	(France) Charles Pic	Marussia-Cosworth	1:54.143			24^{4}

Notes:

- ^1 – Nico Hülkenberg was given a five-place grid penalty for changing his gearbox.
- ^2 – Kamui Kobayashi was given a five-place grid penalty for causing an avoidable accident with Felipe Massa in Valencia.
- ^3 – Jean-Éric Vergne was given a ten-place grid penalty for causing an avoidable accident with Heikki Kovalainen in Valencia.
- ^4 – Charles Pic failed to set a lap time within 107% of the fastest lap time set in Q1. His entry into the race depended on an injunction from the race stewards. He received a five-place grid penalty for changing his gearbox, before being given permission to enter the race by the stewards, leaving him twenty-fourth overall.

=== Race ===
Pos	No	Driver	Constructor	Laps	Time/Retired	Grid	Points
1	2	(Australia) Mark Webber	Red Bull-Renault	52	1:25:11.288	2	25
2	5	(Spain) Fernando Alonso	Ferrari	52	+3.060	1	18
3	1	(Germany) Sebastian Vettel	Red Bull-Renault	52	+4.836	4	15
4	6	(Brazil) Felipe Massa	Ferrari	52	+9.519	5	12
5	9	(Finland) Kimi Räikkönen	Lotus-Renault	52	+10.314	6	10
6	10	(France) Romain Grosjean	Lotus-Renault	52	+17.101	9	8
7	7	(Germany) Michael Schumacher	Mercedes	52	+29.153	3	6
8	4	(United Kingdom) Lewis Hamilton	McLaren-Mercedes	52	+36.463	8	4
9	19	(Brazil) Bruno Senna	Williams-Renault	52	+43.347	13	2
10	3	(United Kingdom) Jenson Button	McLaren-Mercedes	52	+44.444	16	1
11	14	(Japan) Kamui Kobayashi	Sauber-Ferrari	52	+45.370	17	
12	12	(Germany) Nico Hülkenberg	Force India-Mercedes	52	+47.856	14	
13	16	(Australia) Daniel Ricciardo	Toro Rosso-Ferrari	52	+51.241	12	
14	17	(France) Jean-Éric Vergne	Toro Rosso-Ferrari	52	+53.313	23	
15	8	(Germany) Nico Rosberg	Mercedes	52	+57.394	11	
16	18	(Venezuela) Pastor Maldonado	Williams-Renault	51	+1 Lap	7	
17	20	(Finland) Heikki Kovalainen	Caterham-Renault	51	+1 Lap	19	
18	24	(Germany) Timo Glock	Marussia-Cosworth	51	+1 Lap	20	
19	25	(France) Charles Pic	Marussia-Cosworth	51	+1 Lap	24	
20	22	(Spain) Pedro de la Rosa	HRT-Cosworth	50	+2 Laps	21	
21	23	(India) Narain Karthikeyan	HRT-Cosworth	50	+2 Laps	22	
Ret	15	(Mexico) Sergio Pérez	Sauber-Ferrari	11	Collision	15	
Ret	11	(United Kingdom) Paul di Resta	Force India-Mercedes	2	Collision damage	10	
DNS	21	(Russia) Vitaly Petrov	Caterham-Renault	0	Engine	18	

== Championship standings after the race ==
Drivers' Championship standings

	Pos.	Driver	Points
	1	(Spain) Fernando Alonso	129
	2	(Australia) Mark Webber	116
1	3	(Germany) Sebastian Vettel	100
1	4	(United Kingdom) Lewis Hamilton	92
1	5	(Finland) Kimi Räikkönen	83

Constructors' Championship standings

	Pos.	Constructor	Points
	1	(Austria) Red Bull-Renault	216
2	2	(Italy) Ferrari	152
	3	(United Kingdom) Lotus-Renault	144
2	4	(United Kingdom) McLaren-Mercedes	142
	5	(Germany) Mercedes	98

- Note: Only the top five positions are included for both sets of standings.

== See also ==
- 2012 Silverstone GP2 Series round
- 2012 Silverstone GP3 Series round

Previous race: 2012 European Grand Prix	FIA Formula One World Championship; 2012 season	Next race: 2012 German Grand Prix
Previous race: 2011 British Grand Prix	British Grand Prix	Next race: 2013 British Grand Prix
