= 2012 German Grand Prix =

Race 10 of 20 in the 2012 Formula One World Championship
← Previous race	Next race →
- The Hockenheimring

Race details
- Date: 22 July 2012
- Official name: Formula 1 Grosser Preis Santander von Deutschland 2012
- Location: Hockenheimring, Hockenheim, Germany
- Course: Permanent racing facility
- Course length: 4.574 km (2.842 miles)
- Distance: 67 laps, 306.458 km (190.424 miles)
- Weather: Fine and Dry Air Temp 22 °C (72 °F) Track Temp 30 °C (86 °F)

Pole position
Driver	(Spain) Fernando Alonso	Ferrari
- Time: 1:40.621

Fastest lap
Driver	(Germany) Michael Schumacher	Mercedes
- Time: 1:18.725 on lap 58

Podium
First	(Spain) Fernando Alonso	Ferrari
Second	(United Kingdom) Jenson Button	McLaren-Mercedes
Third	(Finland) Kimi Räikkönen	Lotus-Renault

The 2012 German Grand Prix, formally the Formula 1 Grosser Preis Santander von Deutschland 2012, was a Formula One motor race that took place on 22 July 2012 as the tenth round of the 2012 season. After being held at the Nürburgring in 2011, the race returned to the Hockenheimring in Baden-Württemberg, making the 2012 race the thirty-third time the circuit hosted the German Grand Prix, and the eighth time the shortened circuit hosted the race since its 2002 redesign.

Ferrari driver Fernando Alonso got his 22nd pole position before going on to win the race, with McLaren's Jenson Button and Lotus' Kimi Räikkönen completing the podium. This race would see Michael Schumacher set his 77th and final fastest lap in Formula One, a record he still holds as of 2025. By winning the German Grand Prix, Alonso achieved his 30th Grand Prix victory overall, becoming the fifth driver after Alain Prost, Ayrton Senna, Nigel Mansell and Michael Schumacher to achieve this feat.

Alonso increased his points advantage to 34 points over Webber, bringing up their totals to 154 and 120, respectively. While Vettel remained in third with 110 points, Räikkönen overtook Hamilton in the standings for fourth spot, six points clear of Hamilton following the latter's retirement. Meanwhile, Ferrari narrowed their deficit to Red Bull to 53 points, while McLaren overtook Lotus for third in the standings having amassed 160 points, with Lotus being shy by only one point.

== Report ==
=== Background ===
As there was no race at Hockenheim in 2011, 2012 was the first year that the drag reduction system (DRS) and Pirelli tyres featured at the circuit. The DRS detection zone for the race was located at turn four, with the activation zone located 260 metres (850 ft) further down the road, so that it could be used on the approach to the hairpin.

Tyre supplier Pirelli chose to run with the most commonly run tyre combination of the year to date, and brought its white-banded medium compound tyre as the harder "prime" tyre and the yellow-banded soft compound tyre as the softer "option" tyre to the Hockenheim circuit.

=== Driver penalties ===
Romain Grosjean took a five-place grid penalty after his team discovered a terminal issue in his gearbox. Nico Rosberg and Mark Webber were also given five-place penalties for gearbox changes. Sergio Pérez was given a five-place grid penalty for impeding Fernando Alonso and Kimi Räikkönen in the second qualifying session.

=== Drivers ===
Dani Clos took over Narain Karthikeyan's HRT during the first free practice session. Jules Bianchi replaced Paul di Resta at Force India, while Valtteri Bottas once again drove Bruno Senna's Williams for the same session. This race marked Lewis Hamilton's 100th race and Kamui Kobayashi's 50th race.

=== Race ===
The conditions on the grid were dry and sunny before the race; the air temperature ranged between 20–21 °C (68–70 °F) and the track temperature was between 30–32 °C (86–90 °F). Fernando Alonso won the race, his 30th in Formula One to become the only driver to win three races at this point in the season, Jenson Button was 2nd after Sebastian Vettel was given a 20 second time penalty for passing the former by going off the track, the penalty dropped the German down to 5th. Michael Schumacher got the 77th and final fastest lap of his Formula One career.

== Classification ==
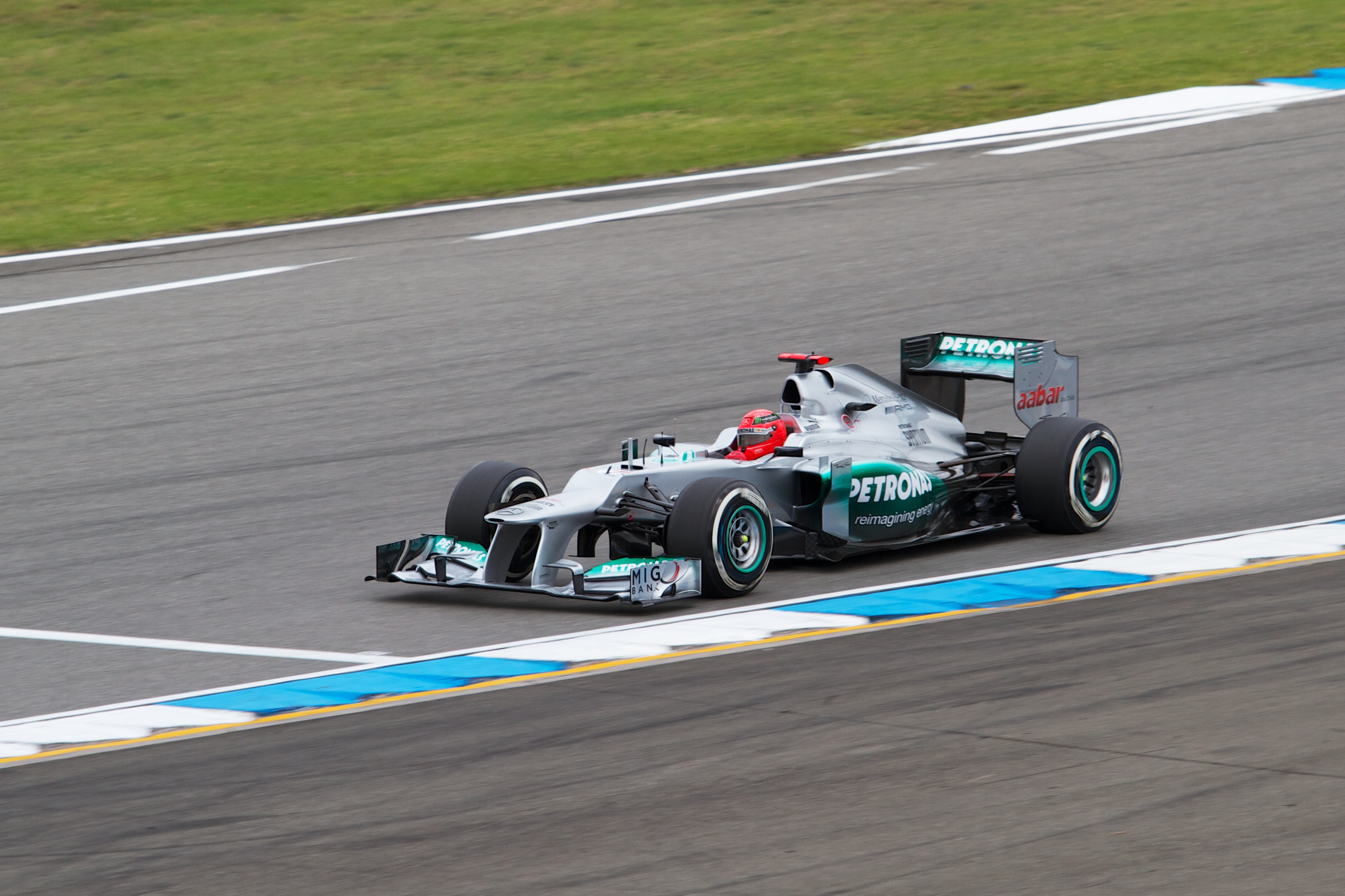
Michael Schumacher qualified fourth

=== Qualifying ===
Pos.	No.	Driver	Constructor	Part 1	Part 2	Part 3	Grid
1	5	(Spain) Fernando Alonso	Ferrari	1:16.073	1:38.521	1:40.621	1
2	1	(Germany) Sebastian Vettel	Red Bull-Renault	1:16.393	1:38.309	1:41.026	2
3	2	(Australia) Mark Webber	Red Bull-Renault	1:16.500	1:39.382	1:41.496	8^{1}
4	7	(Germany) Michael Schumacher	Mercedes	1:16.686	1:38.010	1:42.459	3
5	12	(Germany) Nico Hülkenberg	Force India-Mercedes	1:16.271	1:39.467	1:43.501	4
6	18	(Venezuela) Pastor Maldonado	Williams-Renault	1:16.181	1:38.731	1:43.950	5
7	3	(United Kingdom) Jenson Button	McLaren-Mercedes	1:16.507	1:38.659	1:44.113	6
8	4	(United Kingdom) Lewis Hamilton	McLaren-Mercedes	1:16.221	1:37.365	1:44.186	7
9	11	(United Kingdom) Paul di Resta	Force India-Mercedes	1:16.352	1:39.703	1:44.889	9
10	9	(Finland) Kimi Räikkönen	Lotus-Renault	1:15.693	1:39.729	1:45.811	10
11	16	(Australia) Daniel Ricciardo	Toro Rosso-Ferrari	1:16.516	1:39.789		11
12	15	(Mexico) Sergio Pérez	Sauber-Ferrari	1:15.726	1:39.933		17^{2}
13	14	(Japan) Kamui Kobayashi	Sauber-Ferrari	1:16.481	1:39.985		12
14	6	(Brazil) Felipe Massa	Ferrari	1:16.265	1:40.212		13
15	10	(France) Romain Grosjean	Lotus-Renault	1:16.685	1:40.574		19^{1}
16	19	(Brazil) Bruno Senna	Williams-Renault	1:16.426	1:40.752		14
17	8	(Germany) Nico Rosberg	Mercedes	1:15.988	1:41.551		21^{1}
18	17	(France) Jean-Éric Vergne	Toro Rosso-Ferrari	1:16.741			15
19	20	(Finland) Heikki Kovalainen	Caterham-Renault	1:17.620			16
20	21	(Russia) Vitaly Petrov	Caterham-Renault	1:18.531			18
21	25	(France) Charles Pic	Marussia-Cosworth	1:19.220			20
22	24	(Germany) Timo Glock	Marussia-Cosworth	1:19.291			22
23	22	(Spain) Pedro de la Rosa	HRT-Cosworth	1:19.912			23
24	23	(India) Narain Karthikeyan	HRT-Cosworth	1:20.230			24
107% time: 1:20.991

Notes:

^1 — Romain Grosjean, Nico Rosberg and Mark Webber were each demoted five places as a penalty for changing their gearboxes before the race.
^2 — Sergio Pérez was demoted five places as a penalty for impeding Fernando Alonso and Kimi Räikkönen in the second qualifying session.

=== Race ===
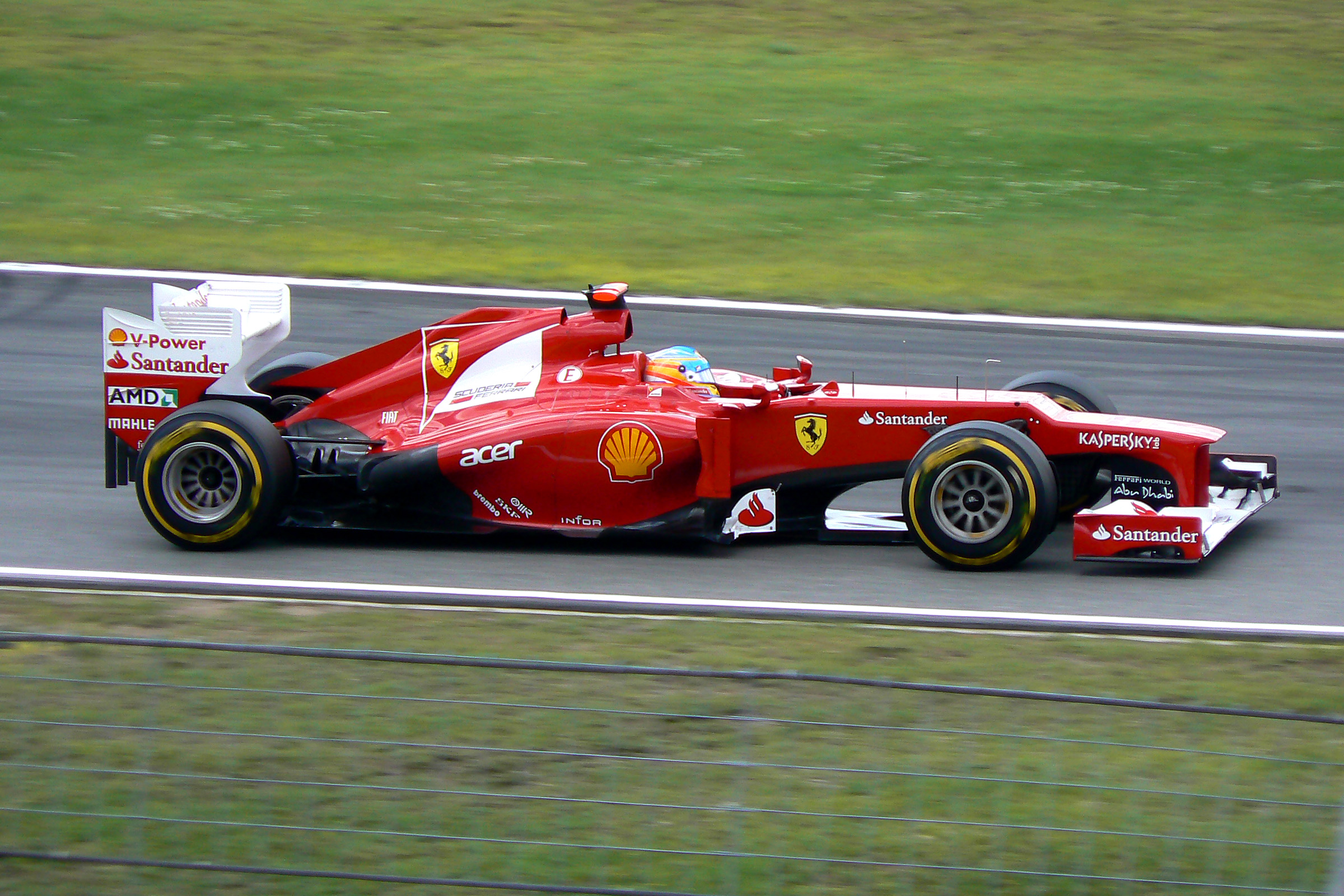
Fernando Alonso started the race from pole position and won.

Pos.	No.	Driver	Constructor	Laps	Time/Retired	Grid	Points
1	5	(Spain) Fernando Alonso	Ferrari	67	1:31:05.862	1	25
2	3	(United Kingdom) Jenson Button	McLaren-Mercedes	67	+6.931	6	18
3	9	(Finland) Kimi Räikkönen	Lotus-Renault	67	+16.409	10	15
4	14	(Japan) Kamui Kobayashi	Sauber-Ferrari	67	+21.925	12	12
5	1	(Germany) Sebastian Vettel	Red Bull-Renault	67	+23.732^{1}	2	10
6	15	(Mexico) Sergio Pérez	Sauber-Ferrari	67	+27.896	17	8
7	7	(Germany) Michael Schumacher	Mercedes	67	+28.970	3	6
8	2	(Australia) Mark Webber	Red Bull-Renault	67	+46.941	8	4
9	12	(Germany) Nico Hülkenberg	Force India-Mercedes	67	+48.162	4	2
10	8	(Germany) Nico Rosberg	Mercedes	67	+48.889	21	1
11	11	(United Kingdom) Paul di Resta	Force India-Mercedes	67	+59.227	9	
12	6	(Brazil) Felipe Massa	Ferrari	67	+1:11.428	13	
13	16	(Australia) Daniel Ricciardo	Toro Rosso-Ferrari	67	+1:16.829	11	
14	17	(France) Jean-Éric Vergne	Toro Rosso-Ferrari	67	+1:16.965	15	
15	18	(Venezuela) Pastor Maldonado	Williams-Renault	66	+1 Lap	5	
16	21	(Russia) Vitaly Petrov	Caterham-Renault	66	+1 Lap	18	
17	19	(Brazil) Bruno Senna	Williams-Renault	66	+1 Lap	14	
18	10	(France) Romain Grosjean	Lotus-Renault	66	+1 Lap	19	
19	20	(Finland) Heikki Kovalainen	Caterham-Renault	65	+2 Laps	16	
20	25	(France) Charles Pic	Marussia-Cosworth	65	+2 Laps	20	
21	22	(Spain) Pedro de la Rosa	HRT-Cosworth	64	+3 Laps	23	
22	24	(Germany) Timo Glock	Marussia-Cosworth	64	+3 Laps	22	
23	23	(India) Narain Karthikeyan	HRT-Cosworth	64	+3 Laps	24	
Ret	4	(United Kingdom) Lewis Hamilton	McLaren-Mercedes	56	Puncture damage	7	

Notes:

^1 — Sebastian Vettel finished 2nd, but received a 20 second post-race drive-through penalty for an illegal overtaking manoeuvre on Jenson Button.

== Championship standings after the race ==
Drivers' Championship standings

	Pos.	Driver	Points
	1	(Spain) Fernando Alonso	154
	2	(Australia) Mark Webber	120
	3	(Germany) Sebastian Vettel	110
1	4	(Finland) Kimi Räikkönen	98
1	5	(United Kingdom) Lewis Hamilton	92

Constructors' Championship standings

	Pos.	Constructor	Points
	1	(Austria) Red Bull-Renault	230
	2	(Italy) Ferrari	177
1	3	(United Kingdom) McLaren-Mercedes	160
1	4	(United Kingdom) Lotus-Renault	159
	5	(Germany) Mercedes	105

- Note: Only the top five positions are included for both sets of standings.

== See also ==
- 2012 Hockenheimring GP2 Series round
- 2012 Hockenheimring GP3 Series round

Previous race: 2012 British Grand Prix	FIA Formula One World Championship; 2012 season	Next race: 2012 Hungarian Grand Prix
Previous race: 2011 German Grand Prix	German Grand Prix	Next race: 2013 German Grand Prix
