= 2012 European Grand Prix =

8th round of the 2012 Formula One season

Race 8 of 20 in the 2012 Formula One World Championship
← Previous race	Next race →
- The Valencia Street Circuit

Race details
- Date: 24 June 2012
- Official name: 2012 Formula 1 Grand Prix of Europe
- Location: Valencia Street Circuit, Valencia, Spain
- Course: Temporary street circuit
- Course length: 5.419 km (3.367 miles)
- Distance: 57 laps, 308.883 km (191.931 miles)
- Weather: Fine and Dry Air Temp 27 °C (81 °F) Track Temp 45 °C (113 °F)

Pole position
Driver	(Germany) Sebastian Vettel	Red Bull-Renault
- Time: 1:38.086

Fastest lap
Driver	(Germany) Nico Rosberg	Mercedes
- Time: 1:42.163 on lap 54

Podium
First	(Spain) Fernando Alonso	Ferrari
Second	(Finland) Kimi Räikkönen	Lotus-Renault
Third	(Germany) Michael Schumacher	Mercedes

The 2012 European Grand Prix (formally, the 2012 Formula 1 Grand Prix of Europe) was a Formula One motor race that was held at the Valencia Street Circuit in Valencia, Spain on 24 June 2012. It was the eighth round of the 2012 championship season, and the final time the circuit hosted the European Grand Prix or any other Formula One race.

It was Fernando Alonso's second Grand Prix win in Spain after the 2006 Spanish Grand Prix held at Barcelona, with Kimi Räikkönen finishing second in the race. Michael Schumacher finished third at the age of 43 years and 173 days, the oldest driver to climb to the podium since Jack Brabham's second-place finish at the 1970 British Grand Prix. It was Schumacher's best result since his comeback in 2010 and the final podium finish of his Formula One career.

== Report ==
=== Background ===
After experimenting with two drag reduction system (DRS) zones with a single detection point in 2011, the FIA decided that the 2012 race would use a single, longer DRS zone, mirroring the approach used in Canada. The detection point was positioned on the approach to Turn 8, with the activation point located between Turn 10 and Turn 11, and was brought forward 70 metres (230 ft) from its position in the 2011 race, allowing drivers to activate the system sooner. The second DRS activation zone, located after Turn 14 in 2011, was removed for the 2012 race.

Like the 2011 European Grand Prix, tyre supplier Pirelli brought its white-banded medium compound tyre as the harder "prime" tyre and the yellow-banded soft compound tyre as the softer "option" tyre.

Jules Bianchi replaced Nico Hülkenberg at Force India in the first practice session, while Valtteri Bottas drove Bruno Senna's Williams once again.

=== Qualifying ===
Marussia driver Timo Glock decided not to take part in Saturday's qualifying session or start the race because he was suffering from food poisoning. His teammate, Charles Pic, qualified in twenty-third and last place. The HRTs occupied the row in front of him on the grid, with Pedro de la Rosa out-qualifying Narain Karthikeyan. The Red Bull of Mark Webber was very out of place, qualifying in nineteenth due to hydraulic problems which meant he could not use the DRS rear wing. The Caterham of Vitaly Petrov qualified on the same row as Webber in twentieth, whilst the Toro Rosso of Jean-Éric Vergne qualified eighteenth again.

The other Toro Rosso of Daniel Ricciardo did make it through to the second qualifying session, but ended up on the same row as his teammate in seventeenth. Caterham driver Heikki Kovalainen, doing a great job to make Q2, enjoyed his joint-best qualifying of the season in sixteenth, in front of Ricciardo. He was, however, more than a second behind Sergio Pérez of Sauber, who took fifteenth spot on the grid. Ferrari made a strategical error in choosing to use just one set of soft tyres for their drivers, resulting in Fernando Alonso qualifying eleventh, and Felipe Massa setting the thirteenth quickest time. Williams driver and fellow countryman Bruno Senna qualified on the same row as Massa, in fourteenth. Just three-tenths of a second separated Romain Grosjean's fastest time of the session, and Massa's thirteenth fastest time, proving the competitiveness of the 2012 field. The Mercedes of Michael Schumacher was the car between the Ferraris in twelfth, missing out, like Senna and Pérez, when their teammates made it into Q3.

Seven teams were represented by the ten drivers in the third and final part of qualifying. Sebastian Vettel took his second pole position of the season by four-tenths of a second; it was also the 33rd pole position of his career, meaning that he moved up into joint third with Alain Prost and Jim Clark in the all time list for most pole positions. It was Vettel's third consecutive pole at the Valencia Street Circuit, on the track's final appearance. It was much closer behind him though, the other nine cars separated by just half a second. Lewis Hamilton accompanied him by qualifying second, his fifth front row start of the season, and the seventh time he had initially qualified there. Pastor Maldonado impressed by qualifying third, eleven places in front of his teammate, and also in front of the two Lotus cars, who qualified fourth and fifth with Grosjean marginally ahead of Kimi Räikkönen. Nico Rosberg took his Mercedes to sixth and Kamui Kobayashi was successful in qualifying his Sauber seventh. Rosberg claimed after the session that Hamilton had blocked him at the end of his out-lap, spoiling his final effort. The matter was looked into by the stewards, but they decided not to take further action. Nico Hülkenberg, in the improved Force India, narrowly missed out on a higher grid slot in eighth, as Jenson Button bemoaned oversteer in his McLaren again and was down in ninth. Paul di Resta's lap looked promising (he had predicted a top five grid slot had it all gone to plan), but he made a small mistake at the final corner of the lap and ended up down in tenth. Six of the drivers in the top ten actually set a faster time in Q2 than they did in Q3. The four drivers who did not were Vettel, Hamilton, Maldonado and Räikkönen.

Unusually for the 2012 season, all of the drivers started the race in the same places they qualified because no penalties were implemented.

=== Race ===
The top 10 qualifiers all started on the soft 'option' tyres which they used in Q3, as did most of those behind, though they had a choice. Michael Schumacher, Sergio Pérez and Mark Webber were the three who started on the medium tyres.

Just like in the previous race in Canada, polesitter Sebastian Vettel was able to get a powerful launch off the startline in his Red Bull and went into the first corner unchallenged, and Lewis Hamilton who was alongside him on the front row stayed second. Kimi Räikkönen got a good launch from 5th on the grid and was nearly alongside third place starter Pastor Maldonado but had to back off to avoid hitting him and his Lotus teammate Romain Grosjean took advantage to jump into third, and Kamui Kobayashi took 4th, as Maldonado and Räikkönen dropped to 5th and 6th. The Ferraris of Fernando Alonso and Felipe Massa were the chief gainers on the first lap, Alonso moving from 11th on the grid to 8th and Massa from 13th to 10th. Force India were also running strongly at the end of the first lap, with Nico Hülkenberg and Paul di Resta splitting the Ferraris in 7th and 9th. The two men who lost out at the start were Nico Rosberg, who dropped to 11th from 6th on the grid and was just a single place in front of Mercedes teammate Michael Schumacher, and Jenson Button in the second McLaren who lost four places and was down in 13th.

Vettel showed very impressive pace in the early stages of the race, building a 4-second lead within the first two laps and continuing to extend it at a second per lap. Hamilton was unable to keep up with him and was defending from Grosjean, with Kobayashi, Maldonado and Räikkönen all able to keep up. Hülkenberg dropped to 3 seconds behind Räikkönen and was kept busy in the opening laps keeping Alonso behind. The order stayed the same till lap 10 when Grosjean used the DRS to get alongside Hamilton before completing a move around the outside of turns 12 and 13. He immediately pulled away from the McLaren driver, though Vettel was already 14 seconds ahead, but on a clear track he was able to run lap times that were within two to three-tenths of Vettel's. On the next lap, Alonso passed Hülkenberg for seventh with a similar move.

Button, down in 12th place, was the first driver to make his pit stop for new tyres, doing so on lap 11, and he went for the medium compound whereas Massa, who was held up behind and unable to pass di Resta went for the soft tyre when he pitted one lap later. Maldonado was suffering from tyre wear towards the end of this stint, and was passed by Räikkönen and then Alonso, with the latter duo then setting off after Kobayashi. Kobayashi immediately decided to pit, with Räikkönen and Maldonado following him in. A minor pit stop problem for Kobayashi allowed Räikkönen to get ahead of him but Alonso was able to jump the duo of them by staying out a lap longer. Vettel and Grosjean pitted on lap 15, with the defending world champion rejoining still in the lead.

Grosjean and Hamilton rejoined behind di Resta and Rosberg, who did not pit, but neither offered much resistance to them, and soon the duo were back up to second and third, though Grosjean was now 20 seconds behind Vettel. The rest of the early stoppers were stuck behind the trio of Schumacher, Bruno Senna in the other Williams and Mark Webber, all three of whom were yet to stop, and losing pace on their worn tyres, created a massive traffic jam as a number of drivers, led by Alonso with Räikkönen, Kobayashi, Maldonado, Massa, Hülkenberg, Button and Sergio Pérez were all close behind. Alonso was able to clear the trio, passing Webber and Senna in the space of a few corners, and Schumacher on the next lap. Schumacher and Webber both stopped for new tyres at the end of the lap, leaving Senna to hold off the rest of the cars on new tyres. Räikkönen passed Senna almost immediately, and Kobayashi attacked Senna on the long straight before Turn 8. Senna was unaware that Kobayashi was already moving down the inside and tried to defend the inside line, and the duo touched, with Kobayashi's front wing being damaged and Senna suffering a puncture, and both men had to come into the pits.

At the front, Grosjean was able to match Vettel's pace for the first time in the race, though the German was able to hold the gap at 20 seconds. Hamilton was unable to keep up with the leading duo, with Alonso and Räikkönen both making short work of di Resta and started to close in on Hamilton. Di Resta finally pitted on lap 25 and went on the medium compound tyres, promoting Maldonado to sixth, with Massa, Hülkenberg, Button and Pérez completing the top 10, all having made one stop. Massa, Button and Pérez all had to make an early second stop for tyres in the next few laps as they were the earliest to make their first.

The complexion of the race took a big turn when, on lap 27, well down the field, Jean-Éric Vergne tried to make a DRS-assisted pass on Heikki Kovalainen through turn 12. Vergne thought that his car was fully in front of Kovalainen but it actually wasn't and he ended up chopping his car straight onto Kovalainen's, puncturing his right rear tyre and Kovalainen's left front, and debris caused by the shredding tyres was spread all over the track, thus causing the intervention of the safety car. Both Vergne and Kovalainen made it to the pits, with Vergne retiring due to suspension damage whereas Kovalainen was able to continue.

The intervention of the safety car not only just bunched up the field, erasing Vettel's 20 second lead at the front, but also sent most of the drivers, including all the leaders, in for their second tyre stop. There was more pit-stop trouble for Lewis Hamilton, as a problem with the front jack meant that he dropped behind both Alonso and Räikkönen after the stops. The safety car intervention also meant that Massa, Button and Pérez, the trio who made their second stops before it came out, lost a lot of places as most of the drivers were able to stop under the safety car, this left the trio down in 14th, 15th and 16th. The drivers that did not stop in this period were Daniel Ricciardo and those that had made their first stop late – Rosberg, Schumacher, Webber and di Resta. This put Ricciardo into 4th place, behind Vettel, Grosjean and Alonso. Räikkönen was fifth, and Hamilton sixth after his pit stop troubles.

The race restarted on lap 34, and Alonso immediately took the opportunity to get alongside Grosjean and pass him round the outside at turn 1. Rosberg, in seventh and on the older tyres immediately lost five places to teammate Schumacher, Webber, Maldonado, Hülkenberg and di Resta. Further down the pack, there was a collision between Massa and Kobayashi while battling for 13th, leaving Massa with a puncture and Kobayashi with terminal suspension damage. At around the same time, race leader Vettel lost drive coming out of turn 10 and he had to retire, with what was later said to be an alternator failure. Alonso took the lead ahead of Grosjean, and Ricciardo ran third briefly as Hamilton passed Räikkönen for fourth. Ricciardo's tyres did not last long, and soon, after being passed by both Hamilton and Räikkönen, he had to pit for new tyres.

Schumacher was running fifth now ahead of Webber, but the latter was suffering from serious tyre problems and, after being passed by Maldonado and the two Force India cars within the space of a few corners, he went into the pits. Schumacher was also on older tyres and pitted for new ones three laps later, rejoining in 11th place, just ahead of Webber. The race at the front of the field took yet another twist when, on lap 41, Grosjean who was running within a second of Alonso had to retire with an alternator failure suspected to be similar to that of Vettel's. This left Alonso with a 3-second lead over Hamilton, who was now under pressure from Räikkönen, with Maldonado up to 4th now ahead of the Force India duo of Hülkenberg and di Resta, the latter trying a one-stopper. He was soon under attack from Pérez, who along with Button, had recovered back up to seventh and eighth.

Alonso continued to lead comfortably at the front, with Hamilton continuing to hold off Räikkönen for second though the latter rarely allowed the gap to go over a second. Maldonado, Hülkenberg and di Resta began to spread out, and the action behind was from Schumacher and Webber, who on new softer tyres were going around 2 seconds quicker than those in front of them. The duo picked off Senna, before closing in on and passing Button on lap 49. As the tyres started to wear out for the other drivers, they fell into the clutches of Schumacher and Webber, who passed Pérez three laps later, and di Resta after another lap to move up into 6th and 7th respectively. Hülkenberg was next up and he too was dealt with by the duo on the penultimate lap, moving Schumacher into 5th and Webber into 6th, but it was not going to stay that way.

Hamilton in second, in his attempts to hold off Räikkönen had pushed his tyres too much, and they started to wear towards the end of the race. Räikkönen patiently bided his time before passing Hamilton on lap 55 with two laps left, when Hamilton's tyres were worn out. Hamilton was now under attack from Maldonado, whose pace was strong enough for him to stay out of the reach of Schumacher and Webber. Maldonado attacked Hamilton at turn 1 on the penultimate lap, but some strong defensive driving by Hamilton meant that he kept the place for then despite his worn tyres. Maldonado tried again down into turn 13 using DRS, braving it around the outside into a disappearing gap as the track narrowed. Maldonado tried to complete the move off track, and as he bounced back over the kerb for the left hand part of the chicane, clumsily hit Hamilton, forcing him into the wall and out of the race. Maldonado himself lost his front wing, and dropped back down the order. The race was won by Alonso, who became the first driver to win 2 races this year, and coupled with Vettel's and Hamilton's retirement also took the championship lead. Räikkönen took second and Schumacher was promoted to third, his first podium since his return to F1 and the last podium of his career. Webber was 4th ahead of Hülkenberg, with Rosberg charging up to 6th on new tyres by passing di Resta and Button in the last two laps. Pérez suffered more tyre problems than others and crossed the line 9th, with Maldonado who continued on without his front wing was still able to take the final point in 10th. However, he was given a 20-second time penalty for his collision with Hamilton and was thus demoted to 12th, with his teammate Senna thus taking the final point. The race marked the oldest average age of podium finishers in the 21st century with 35 years, 8 months, and 8 days.

Between the top three finishing drivers, this event set a record for the most number of World Drivers' Championships ever represented on a single podium at 10 (Alonso with 2, Räikkönen with 1, and Schumacher with 7). This record would stand until the 2020 Turkish Grand Prix, which would tie the record, and then was surpassed by the 2023 Australian Grand Prix.

=== Post-race ===
Jean-Éric Vergne was given a ten-place grid penalty for the next race for causing an avoidable collision with Heikki Kovalainen. He was also fined 25,000 euros for driving dangerously when he had a puncture. Kamui Kobayashi was awarded a five-place grid penalty at the next race for the collision with Felipe Massa.

This event would prove to be the last held at the circuit. It has proved unpopular with drivers and fans for its unimaginative layout and lack of suitable overtaking places, leading to mundane races. From 2013, the Spanish Grand Prix was due to alternate between Barcelona and Valencia, but Valencia later dropped out of the contract to host the race.

As a result, Alonso occupied the lead in the Drivers' Championship with 111 points, 20 ahead of Webber who just missed out on the podium. The Australian moved to second in the championship following the retirements of Hamilton and Vettel. The top five in the Constructors' Championship remained unchanged, with Red Bull extending their lead to 39 points over McLaren, as the latter sat on 137 points. Lotus and Ferrari were only eleven and fifteen points behind McLaren in third and fourth, respectively.

== Classification ==
=== Qualifying ===
Pos.	No.	Driver	Constructor	Q1	Q2	Q3	Grid
1	1	(Germany) Sebastian Vettel	Red Bull-Renault	1:39.626	1:38.530	1:38.086	1
2	4	(United Kingdom) Lewis Hamilton	McLaren-Mercedes	1:39.169	1:38.616	1:38.410	2
3	18	(Venezuela) Pastor Maldonado	Williams-Renault	1:38.825	1:38.570	1:38.475	3
4	10	(France) Romain Grosjean	Lotus-Renault	1:39.530	1:38.489	1:38.505	4
5	9	(Finland) Kimi Räikkönen	Lotus-Renault	1:39.464	1:38.531	1:38.513	5
6	8	(Germany) Nico Rosberg	Mercedes	1:39.061	1:38.504	1:38.623	6
7	14	(Japan) Kamui Kobayashi	Sauber-Ferrari	1:39.651	1:38.703	1:38.741	7
8	12	(Germany) Nico Hülkenberg	Force India-Mercedes	1:39.009	1:38.689	1:38.752	8
9	3	(United Kingdom) Jenson Button	McLaren-Mercedes	1:39.622	1:38.563	1:38.801	9
10	11	(United Kingdom) Paul di Resta	Force India-Mercedes	1:38.858	1:38.519	1:38.992	10
11	5	(Spain) Fernando Alonso	Ferrari	1:39.409	1:38.707		11
12	7	(Germany) Michael Schumacher	Mercedes	1:39.447	1:38.770		12
13	6	(Brazil) Felipe Massa	Ferrari	1:39.388	1:38.780		13
14	19	(Brazil) Bruno Senna	Williams-Renault	1:39.449	1:39.207		14
15	15	(Mexico) Sergio Pérez	Sauber-Ferrari	1:39.353	1:39.358		15
16	20	(Finland) Heikki Kovalainen	Caterham-Renault	1:40.087	1:40.295		16
17	16	(Australia) Daniel Ricciardo	Toro Rosso-Ferrari	1:39.924	1:40.358		17
18	17	(France) Jean-Éric Vergne	Toro Rosso-Ferrari	1:40.203			18
19	2	(Australia) Mark Webber	Red Bull-Renault	1:40.395			19
20	21	(Russia) Vitaly Petrov	Caterham-Renault	1:40.457			20
21	22	(Spain) Pedro de la Rosa	HRT-Cosworth	1:42.171			21
22	23	(India) Narain Karthikeyan	HRT-Cosworth	1:42.527			22
23	25	(France) Charles Pic	Marussia-Cosworth	1:42.675			23
107% time: 1:45.742
DNS^{1}	24	(Germany) Timo Glock	Marussia-Cosworth	no time			—

Notes
^1 — Timo Glock was unable to participate in the qualifying session due to illness. Glock was later denied medical clearance to take part in the race.

=== Race ===
Pos	No	Driver	Constructor	Laps	Time/Retired	Grid	Points
1	5	(Spain) Fernando Alonso	Ferrari	57	1:44:16.649	11	25
2	9	(Finland) Kimi Räikkönen	Lotus-Renault	57	+6.421	5	18
3	7	(Germany) Michael Schumacher	Mercedes	57	+12.639	12	15
4	2	(Australia) Mark Webber	Red Bull-Renault	57	+13.628	19	12
5	12	(Germany) Nico Hülkenberg	Force India-Mercedes	57	+19.993	8	10
6	8	(Germany) Nico Rosberg	Mercedes	57	+21.176	6	8
7	11	(United Kingdom) Paul di Resta	Force India-Mercedes	57	+22.866	10	6
8	3	(United Kingdom) Jenson Button	McLaren-Mercedes	57	+24.653	9	4
9	15	(Mexico) Sergio Pérez	Sauber-Ferrari	57	+27.777	15	2
10	19	(Brazil) Bruno Senna	Williams-Renault	57	+35.961	14	1
11	16	(Australia) Daniel Ricciardo	Toro Rosso-Ferrari	57	+37.041	17	
12	18	(Venezuela) Pastor Maldonado	Williams-Renault	57	+54.630^{1}	3	
13	21	(Russia) Vitaly Petrov	Caterham-Renault	57	+1:15.871	20	
14	20	(Finland) Heikki Kovalainen	Caterham-Renault	57	+1:34.654	16	
15	25	(France) Charles Pic	Marussia-Cosworth	57	+1:36.551	23	
16	6	(Brazil) Felipe Massa	Ferrari	56	+1 lap	13	
17	22	(Spain) Pedro de la Rosa	HRT-Cosworth	56	+1 lap	21	
18	23	(India) Narain Karthikeyan	HRT-Cosworth	56	+1 lap	22	
19	4	(United Kingdom) Lewis Hamilton	McLaren-Mercedes	55	Collision	2	
Ret	10	(France) Romain Grosjean	Lotus-Renault	40	Alternator	4	
Ret	1	(Germany) Sebastian Vettel	Red Bull-Renault	33	Alternator	1	
Ret	14	(Japan) Kamui Kobayashi	Sauber-Ferrari	33	Collision damage	7	
Ret	17	(France) Jean-Éric Vergne	Toro Rosso-Ferrari	26	Collision damage	18	
DNS	24	(Germany) Timo Glock	Marussia-Cosworth	0	Illness		

Notes
- ^1 — Pastor Maldonado finished 10th, but received a 20-second penalty for "rejoining the track in an unsafe manner" and causing a collision with Lewis Hamilton.
- Lewis Hamilton was classified as he completed over 90% of the race.

== Championship standings after the race ==
Drivers' Championship standings

	Pos.	Driver	Points
1	1	(Spain) Fernando Alonso	111
2	2	(Australia) Mark Webber	91
2	3	(United Kingdom) Lewis Hamilton	88
1	4	(Germany) Sebastian Vettel	85
	5	(Germany) Nico Rosberg	75

Constructors' Championship standings

Pos.	Constructor	Points
1	(Austria) Red Bull-Renault	176
2	(United Kingdom) McLaren-Mercedes	137
3	(United Kingdom) Lotus-Renault	126
4	(Italy) Ferrari	122
5	(Germany) Mercedes	92

- Note: Only the top five positions are included for both sets of standings.

== See also ==
- 2012 Valencia GP2 Series round
- 2012 Valencia GP3 Series round

Previous race: 2012 Canadian Grand Prix	FIA Formula One World Championship; 2012 season	Next race: 2012 British Grand Prix
Previous race: 2011 European Grand Prix	European Grand Prix	Next race: 2016 European Grand Prix
