= Narain Karthikeyan =

Indian racing driver (born 1977)

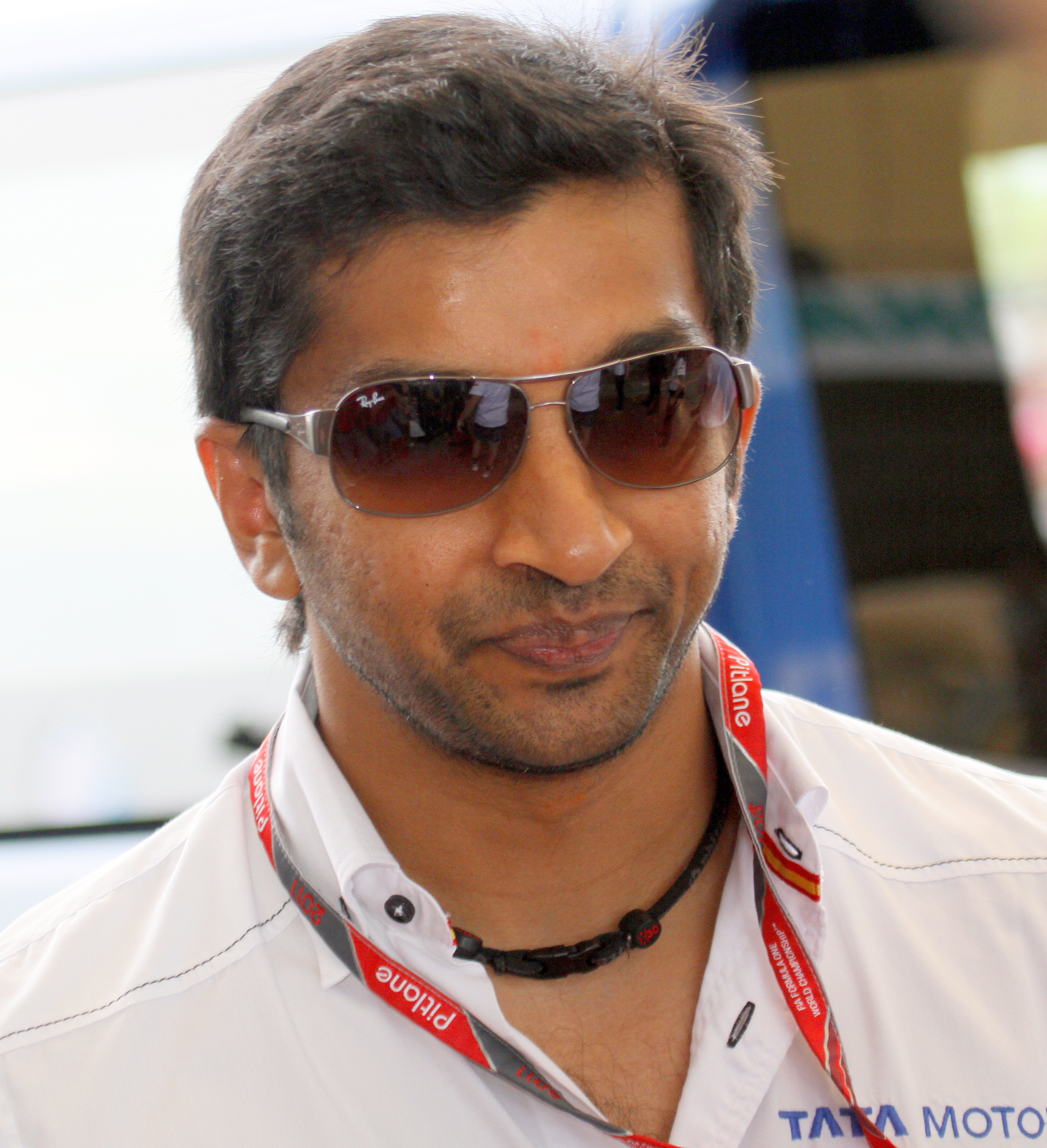
- Karthikeyan at the 2011 Malaysian Grand Prix
- Born: Kumar Ram Narain Karthikeyan; 14 January 1977 (age 49) Coimbatore, Tamil Nadu, India
- Categorisation: FIA Gold

Formula One World Championship career
- Nationality: (India) Indian
- Active years: 2005, 2011–2012
- Team(s): Jordan, HRT
- Entries: 48 (46 starts)
- Championships: 0
- Wins: 0
- Podiums: 0
- Career points: 5
- Pole positions: 0
- Fastest laps: 0
- First entry: 2005 Australian Grand Prix
- Last entry: 2012 Brazilian Grand Prix

Kumar Ram Narain Karthikeyan (Tamil: நரேன் கார்த்திகேயன்; born 14 January 1977) is an Indian former racing driver, who competed in Formula One between 2005 and 2012. (Note: The exact years Karthikeyan competed in Formula One: 2005, 2011–2012.)

== Early life and family background ==
Karthikeyan was born on 14 January 1977 in Coimbatore, Tamil Nadu, to Sheela and Kakarla Karthikeyan Naidu. He has an elder sister, Deepika and younger brother, Rajeev. He did his schooling at Stanes Anglo Indian Higher Secondary School in Coimbatore. His interest in motorsport began at an early age, as his father Karthikeyan was a former Indian national rally champion winning South India Rally seven times.

Karthikeyan went on the Elf Winfield Racing School in France, and became a semi-finalist in the Pilote Elf Competition for Formula Renault cars in 1992.

== Early career ==
Karthikeyan finished on the podium in his first race at Sriperumbudur in a Formula Maruti National racing championship. Then, he went to France and attended the Elf Winfield Racing School. He returned to India to race in Formula Maruti for the 1993 season at the age of 15 years, and in the same year, he also competed in the Formula Vauxhall Junior championship in Great Britain.

Karthikeyan previously competed in A1GP, and the Le Mans Series. He has won multiple races in A1GP, British F3, World series by Nissan, AutoGP, Formula Asia, British Formula Ford and Opel series in his single-seater career. He won the British Formula Ford Winter Series in 1994 and Formula Asia Championship in 1996.

In 1994, Karthikeyan returned to the UK, racing in the Formula Ford Zetec series as the number two works Vector driver for the Foundation Racing team. The highlight of the season was a podium finish in a support race for the Portuguese Grand Prix held at Estoril. He also took part in the British Formula Ford Winter Series, and became the first Indian driver to win any championship in Europe.

In 1995, Karthikeyan graduated to the Formula Asia Championship for just four races. However, he showed pace immediately and was able to finish second in the race at Shah Alam, Malaysia. In 1996, he had a full season in the series and became the first Indian and the first Asian to win the Formula Asia International series. He moved back to Britain in 1997 to compete in the British Formula Opel Championship with the Nemesis Motorsport team, taking a pole position and win at Donington Park and finishing sixth in the overall points standings.

In 1998, Karthikeyan made his debut in the British Formula 3 Championship with the Carlin Motorsport team. Competing in only ten rounds, he managed two third-place finishes in the final two races of the season, at Spa-Francorchamps and Silverstone, to finish 12th overall. He continued in the championship for 1999, finishing on the podium five times, including two wins at Brands Hatch. His season also included two pole positions, three fastest laps and two lap records, helping him to sixth in the championship. He also competed in the Macau Grand Prix, qualifying in sixth position and finishing sixth in the second race. He was the first racing driver to record a win for Carlin in British F3 ever since then Carlin have been invincible in terms of race wins in the British F3 Championship. Continuing his drive in the British F3 Championship in 2000, he finished fourth overall in the standings, and also took pole position and fastest laps in the Macau Grand Prix. He also won both the International F3 race at Spa-Francorchamps and the Korea Super Prix.

Karthikeyan started 2001 in the Formula Nippon F3000 Championship, finishing the year amongst the top ten. In the same year, he became the first Indian to ever drive a Formula One car, testing for the Jaguar Racing team at Silverstone on 14 June. Impressed with his performance, he was then offered a test drive in the Jordan-Honda EJ11 at Silverstone in September. Karthikeyan again tested for Jordan, at Mugello in Italy on 5 October, finishing just half a second off the pace off Jordan's lead driver Jean Alesi.

In 2002, Karthikeyan moved into the Telefónica World Series with Team Tata RC Motorsport, taking a pole position and setting the fastest non-Formula One lap time at the Interlagos Circuit in Brazil. Continuing in the renamed Superfund World Series in 2003, Karthikeyan got four podium finishes on his way to fourth overall in the championship. These results earned him another Formula One test drive, this time with the Minardi team. He was offered a race drive for the 2004 season, but was unable to raise the necessary sponsorship funds to seal the deal.

Karthikeyan continued in the Nissan World Series in 2004, taking wins in Valencia, Spain and Magny-Cours, France, and finished sixth in the standings, and also made a single appearance in the FIA GT Championship for Scuderia Veregra, partnering Anthony Beltoise and Maktoum Hasher Al Maktoum at the Dubai 500km, finishing 11th in class and 19th overall.

== Formula One career ==
=== Jordan (2005) ===
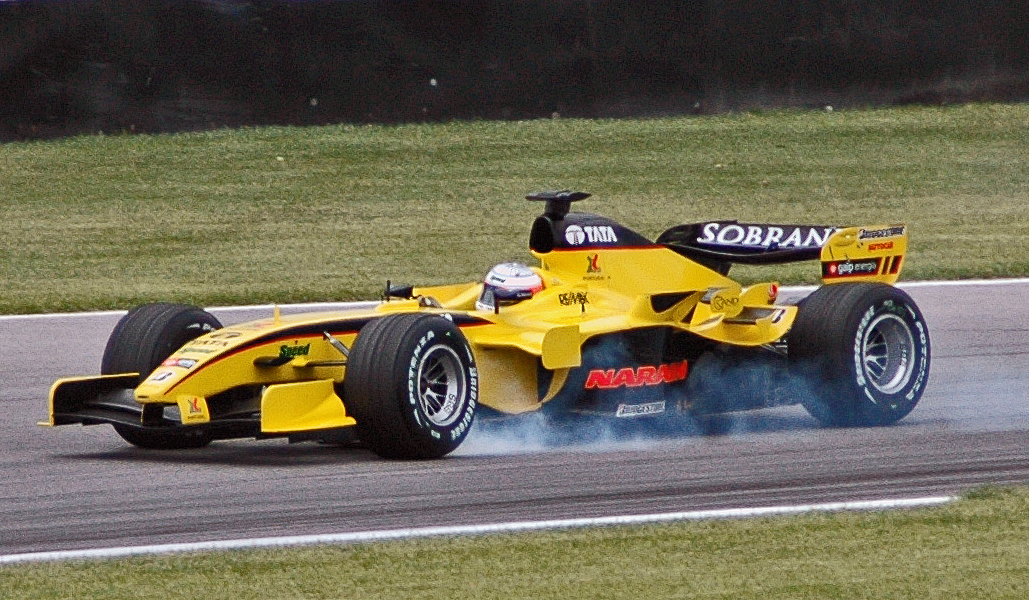
Karthikeyan locking his brakes during qualifying at the 2005 United States Grand Prix

On 1 February 2005, Karthikeyan announced that he had signed a preliminary deal with the Jordan Formula One team and said that he would be their main driver for the 2005 Formula One season, making him India's first Formula One racing driver. His partner was Portuguese driver Tiago Monteiro. Karthikeyan completed the necessary testing distance of 300 km in an F1 car in order to gain his superlicence at the Silverstone Circuit on 10 February.

In his first race, the Australian Grand Prix, Karthikeyan qualified in 12th position. After a poor start which saw him drop to 18th place by the end of the first lap, he finished in 15th, two laps behind winner Giancarlo Fisichella. He achieved his only points in the 2005 United States Grand Prix, where all but three teams pulled out due to an argument over tyre safety. He finished fourth, finishing ahead of the two Minardi drivers but behind teammate Monteiro. Apart from the USGP, his highest finish was 11th place. In the 2005 Japanese Grand Prix free practice, he was fastest for a long period and eventually qualified 11th. At the 2005 Chinese Grand Prix he qualified in 15th place. In an unlucky end to his 2005 season, Karthikeyan crashed his Jordan into a wall at the Chinese race, but was unhurt and able to provide an interview afterwards.

Because the Jordan team was taken over and renamed Midland for the 2006 season, the management change prompted some doubt over Karthikeyan's future at the team. Near the end of 2005, he announced he would not be driving for Midland the following year allegedly due to their demand that he pay as much as $11.7 million to secure his seat on the team.

On 8 December 2005, Karthikeyan tested for Williams at Spain and finished fifth, outpacing the confirmed Williams second driver, Nico Rosberg, who finished ninth. On 27 January 2006, Williams confirmed Karthikeyan as their fourth driver. He was to perform testing duties for the team alongside Alexander Wurz who had been confirmed earlier as the team's third driver. He was retained as a reserve test driver for Williams alongside Kazuki Nakajima in 2007. Karthikeyan said he was "blown away" by the difference between Formula One's stragglers and a top-flight team.

Karthikeyan was a Williams F1 test driver in 2006 and 2007.

Like several other former F1 drivers, Karthikeyan moved to stock car racing and drove the No. 60 Safe Auto Insurance Company Toyota Tundra for Wyler Racing in the 2010 NASCAR Camping World Truck Series.

=== HRT (2011–2012) ===
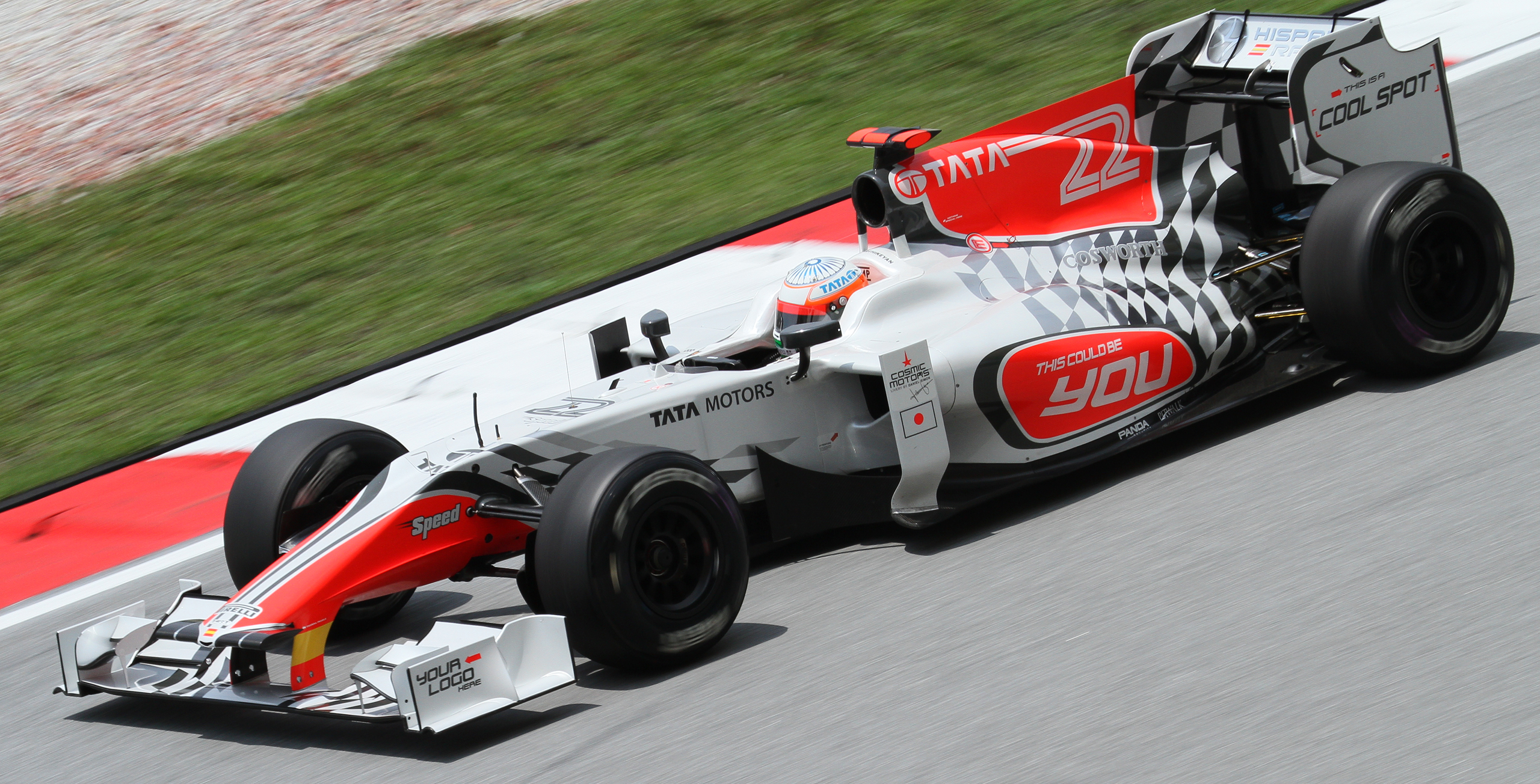
Karthikeyan driving for Hispania at the Malaysian Grand Prix.

Later in 2007, Karthikeyan was linked with the Spyker (previously Jordan) Formula One team after their driver Christijan Albers was fired, although Sakon Yamamoto got the drive. Due to the withdrawal of support of Williams F1 by Tata (Karthikeyan's main sponsor), Nakajima was given the lion's share of testing duties and Karthikeyan was sidelined.

When the Spyker F1 team was bought out by Vijay Mallya towards the end of 2007, Karthikeyan had been linked with a drive with the new Force India Formula One team in 2008. However, he did not even get to test for the team. He was also linked to a drive with the Super Aguri team in January 2008, as one of the terms of an Indian consortium investing in the team. The deal was not agreed and he continued to drive for A1 Team India. He was India's only Formula One driver until the 2010 season, when Karun Chandhok signed to drive for the Hispania Racing F1 Team.

==== 2011 ====
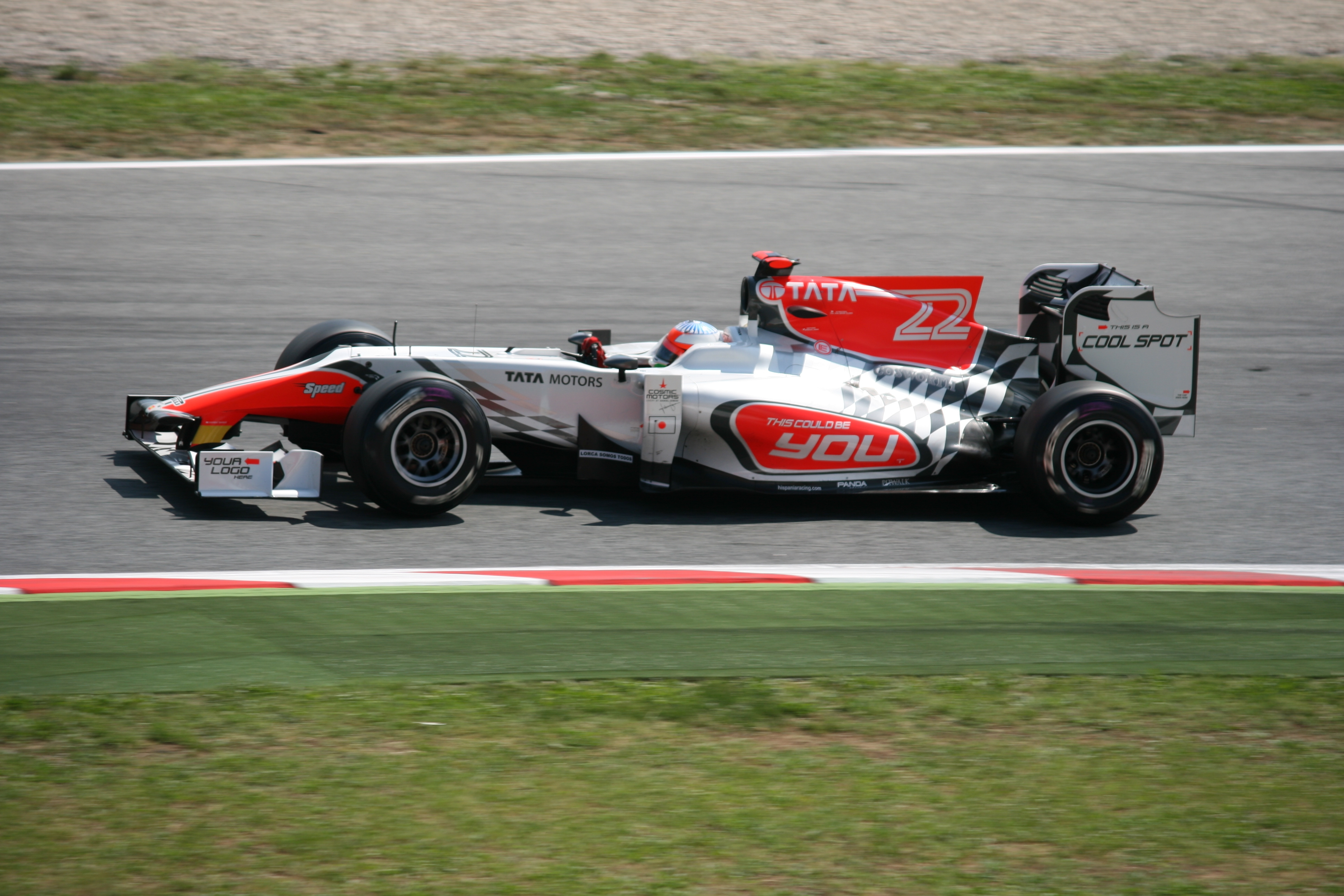
Karthikeyan driving for HRT at the 2011 Spanish Grand Prix.

On 6 January 2011, Karthikeyan announced that he would drive for the Hispania team in the 2011 season, following five years away from active involvement in the championship. He confirmed the deal via his Twitter page, saying it would be a "dream come true to race in front of the home crowd in the Indian GP in October," and adding that the support of financial backers Tata Group had been "instrumental".

Driving for a small team, along with the increasing reliability of modern Formula 1 cars, meant that Karthikeyan twice set the record for the lowest placed finisher in a Formula 1 event. The first occurrence was during the Chinese Grand Prix where the single retirement of Jaime Alguersuari meant Karthikeyan finished in 23rd place, after he was overtaken by teammate Vitantonio Liuzzi on the final lap. However, in the European Grand Prix there were no retirements meaning that Karthikeyan once again broke the record by being the 24th car to cross the finish line.

On 30 June 2011, Karthikeyan was replaced by Daniel Ricciardo for the remaining races of the season except the Indian Grand Prix but participated in Friday first practice in Germany, Singapore, Japan and Korea.

On 23 October 2011, it was confirmed that Karthikeyan would replace Liuzzi for the Indian Grand Prix. Karthikeyan was outqualifed by Ricciardo by 0.022 secs to qualify 22nd. However, Karthikeyan started 24th and last due to blocking Michael Schumacher in qualifying. Despite picking up damage in the first lap of the race, Karthikeyan managed to beat Ricciardo by 31.8 seconds in the race to finish 17th. Liuzzi returned to replace Karthikeyan ahead of the Abu Dhabi Grand Prix.

==== 2012 ====
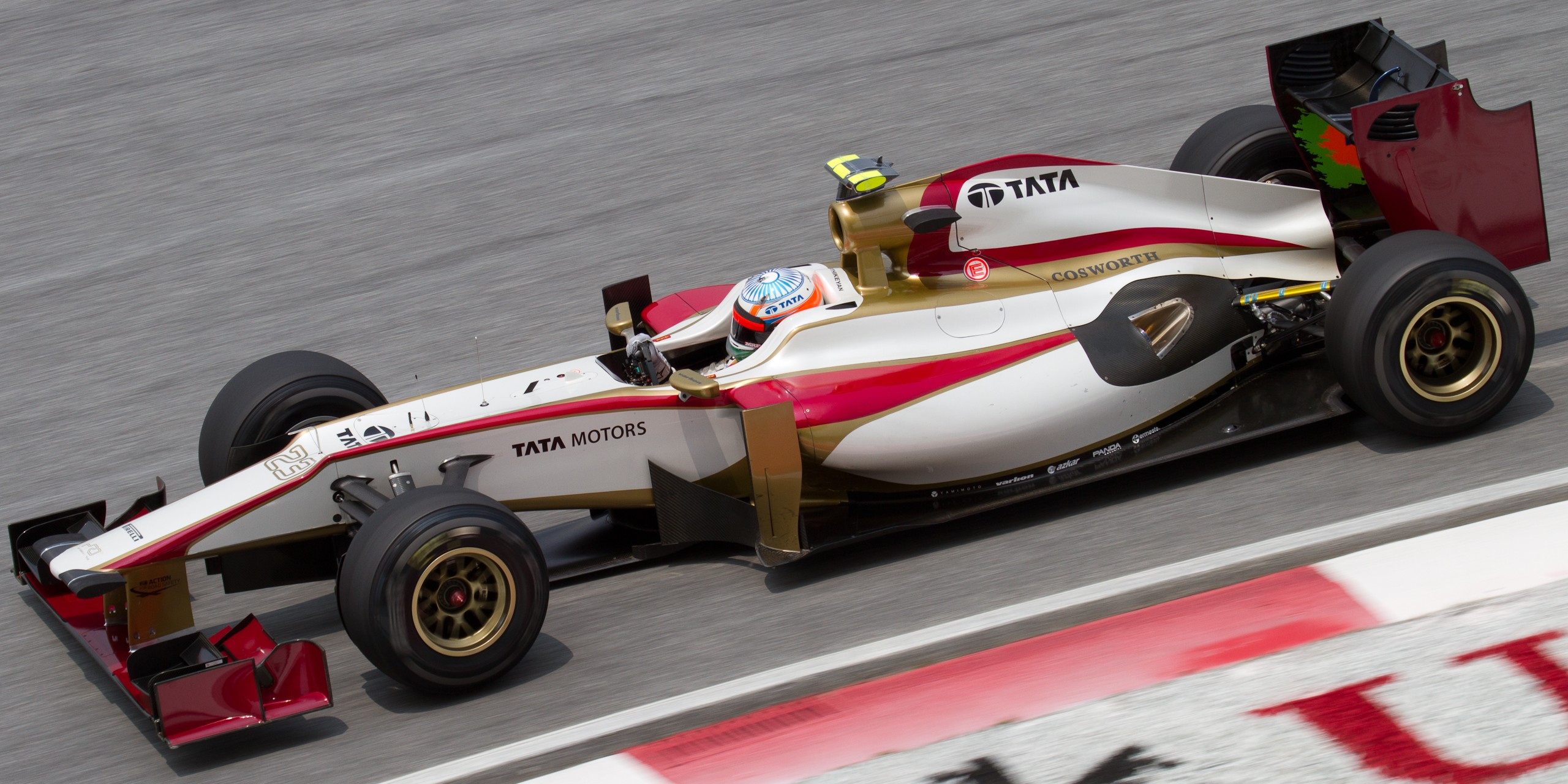
Karthikeyan driving for HRT at the 2012 Malaysian Grand Prix.

On 3 February 2012, it was confirmed that Karthikeyan had again signed for the HRT team for the 2012 season partnering Pedro de la Rosa. In the Australian Grand Prix, he and teammate Pedro de la Rosa were unable to qualify. In Malaysia, both the HRTs managed to qualify, with Karthikeyan starting 23rd due to a five-place gear box penalty for Heikki Kovalainen, the start was wet and the HRTs gambled to start the race on full wet tyres, whilst the other cars started on intermediate tyres. As the rain increased that gamble paid off as other cars had to pit for full wets which promoted Karthikeyan to a points-paying tenth place before the safety car then red flag came out for heavy rain. At the restart, after a few more laps behind the safety car, the track was dry enough for intermediate tyres and a few drivers pitted as the safety car came back in, however Karthikeyan stayed out and was as high as fifth place at one point, before McLaren's Jenson Button crashed into him whilst they were racing for position. Karthikeyan suffered damage however, but he pitted for intermediate tyres which dropped him to the back of the field, bar teammate de la Rosa who had a served a drive-through penalty. On lap 47, Red Bull's Sebastian Vettel received a puncture after hitting Karthikeyan's front wing, whilst lapping him and Vettel was forced to pit and replaced the punctured tyre which put Vettel down from fourth place, finishing 11th; Karthikeyan finished the race in 21st, however he was given a 20-second post-race penalty for his part in the collision, which meant he dropped to 22nd and last, behind de la Rosa.

Post-race, Vettel and Red Bull boss Christian Horner criticised Karthikeyan's driving, with Vettel calling Karthikeyan an "idiot". Karthikeyan hit back at Vettel, calling him a "cry-baby". Later, Kartikeyan decided to call a truce with Vettel, stating his respect for Vettel's abilities and saying "I think we have to deal with it in a mature way and forget about it."

Kartikeyan qualified last for the following five races (bar in Spain where Lewis Hamilton was excluded from qualifying and in Monaco where Sergio Pérez crashed without setting a time) however he started 24th and last twice (in Bahrain and Canada) due to other drivers picking up grid penalties. In China he finished 22nd, ahead of Caterham's Heikki Kovalainen. In Bahrain, he finished 21st and was classified ahead of the Williams of Bruno Senna who retired due to brake issues. In Spain he retired after a wheel nut failure on lap 22 due to a botched pit stop. In Monaco he started 22nd, ahead of Perez and the penalised Pastor Maldonado and finished the race in 15th, classified ahead of McLaren's Jenson Button who retired after collision damage with Kovalainen. In Canada he retired for the second time in the season after suffering a brake failure on lap 22 which made him spin in turn 1 and stop later on in the lap. His teammate Pedro de la Rosa retired with a similar issue two laps later.

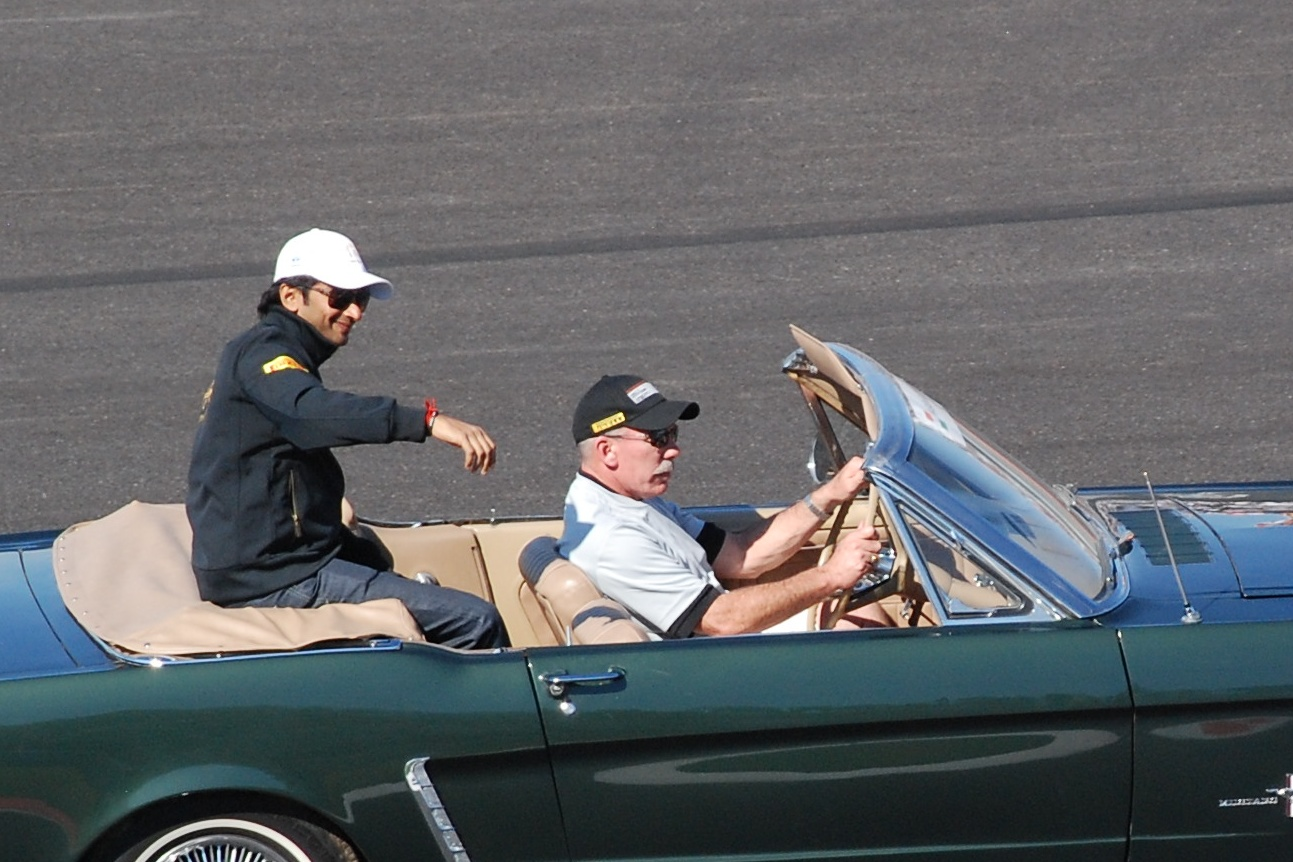
Karthikeyan at the 2012 US Grand Prix

At the European Grand Prix Karthikeyan for the first time in the season qualified 22nd, ahead of the Marussia of Charles Pic, with Timo Glock missing qualifying and the race due to illness. He finished the race in 18th, behind Pic and de la Rosa but classified ahead of Lewis Hamilton who retired after crashing out with two laps remaining. He finished the next 3 races as the final classified finisher before retiring in Hungary due to broken suspension. He qualified last in Belgium, before running as high as 13th during the race, with good pace, before crashing out on lap 30 in broken suspension. He out-qualified his teammate de la Rosa for the first time this year at Monza, but ended up finishing behind him in 19th. He out-qualified him again at Singapore, this time by over a second, but crashed out at turn 16 on lap 30.

Karthikeyan qualified in 24th at Suzuka, having crashed in practice and therefore having to use an old-spec chassis floor. He was running ahead of Pic and de la Rosa for quite some time until retiring with vibrations on lap 32. He did a one-stop strategy in Korea and finished last in 20th, almost a lap behind Pic in 19th. In India he once again finished last, running with minor wing damage from a collision at the first corner. He retired in spectacular fashion on lap 9 in Abu Dhabi after his steering broke and he was rear-ended by Nico Rosberg. He qualified 24th in Austin amid fears that both he and his teammate would be outside the 107% time after struggling to heat the tyres in practice on the brand-new circuit, and then finished last in 22nd, also being accused by Vettel of holding him up when being lapped and allowing Lewis Hamilton to take the lead. He qualified 23rd in Brazil and peaked as high as 11th during the incident-packed opening stint of the race. He eventually dropped back and finished last in 18th. He finished the season in 24th, with zero points.

From 2014–2018, Karthikeyan raced in Japanese Super Formula series. In 2019, he ended his single-seater career by joining Super GT series in Japan.

== Other events and races ==
=== IRL test ===
In 2005, Karthikeyan tested an Indy Racing League (IRL) car for the Red Bull Cheever Racing team for the Indianapolis 500 race and was offered $500,000 as an initial fee, but the deal was not completed.

=== A1 GP ===
In 2007, Karthikeyan also drove for A1 Team India. He made his A1 GP debut in New Zealand and he finished tenth in the sprint race and seventh in the Feature Race.

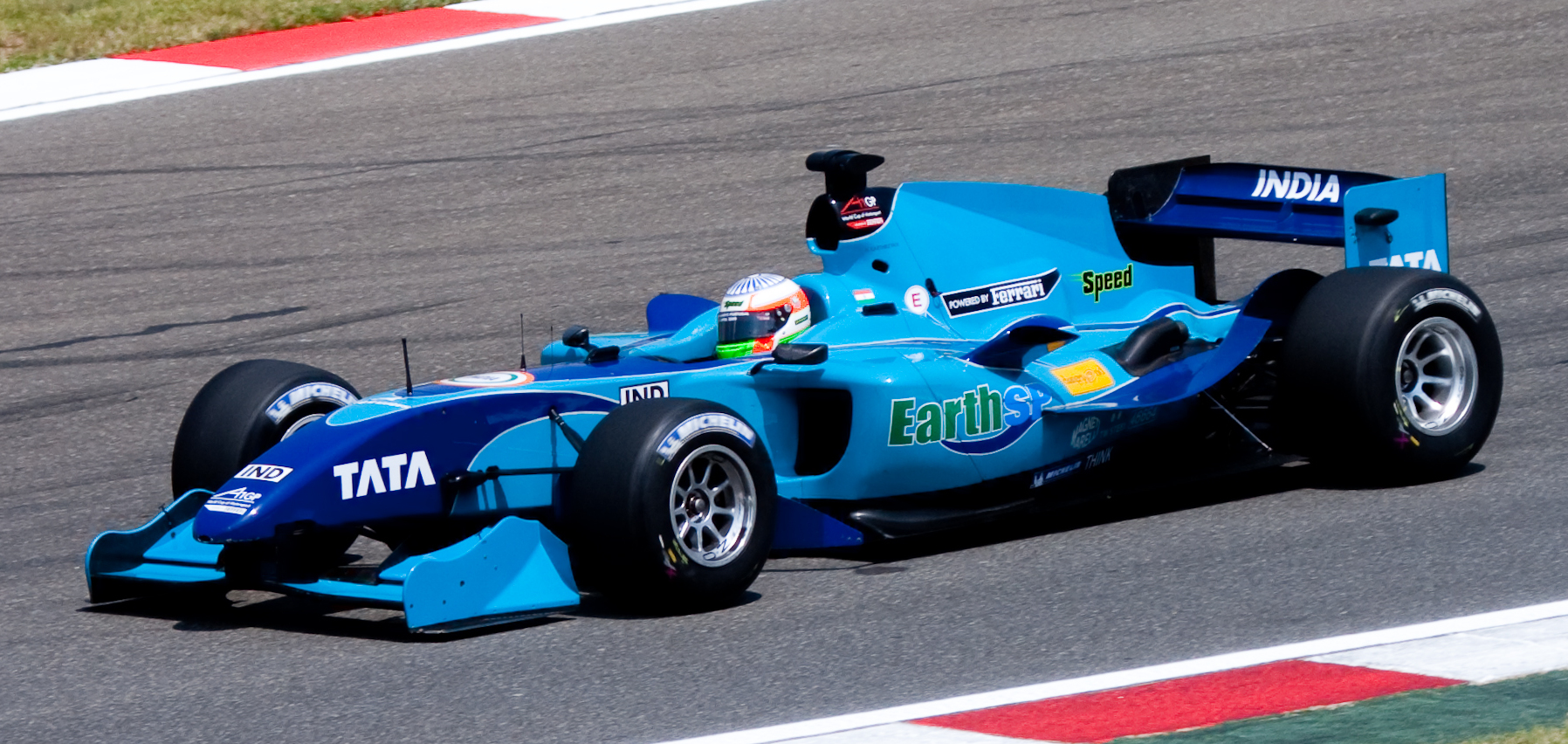
Karthikeyan competing for A1 Team India at the 2008–09 A1 Grand Prix of Nations, South Africa.

Karthikeyan won the A1GP of Zhuhai (China) for Team India on 16 December 2007. This was India's first A1GP win. Karthikeyan is also the first to take pole position for India in the A1GP. He got pole in the feature race in Brands Hatch in 2008. Karthikeyan won two feature races in the 2007–2008 season, including the season finale at Brands Hatch starting from pole position. This helped India finish in the top-ten, ahead of such as Australia, Brazil, China and Italy.

The fourth season for Team India was disastrous as the team lost its title sponsor, which resulted in severe financial constraints. On 3 May 2009 A1 Team India finished the season with a podium finish in the Sprint Race at Brands Hatch. Karthikeyan qualified the A1 Team India car in seventh place on the starting grid for the race. The Feature Race ended abruptly for Karthikeyan, as he was taken out by the spinning car of A1 Team China in front of him on the first corner of the first lap.

The team finished 12th overall in the 2008–09 season.

=== 24 Hours of Le Mans ===
In the second week of March 2009, Karthikeyan tested for the Kolles Le Mans Team. It was later confirmed that for the 2009 Le Mans Series, he would be partnered by Charles Zwolsman, Jr. and Andrew Meyrick. Team Kolles – headed by ex-Jordan, Midland and Force India Team Principal Colin Kolles – took part in the championship with two Audi R10 turbo diesel machines. The car boasted a successful racing history with three Le Mans 24h victories and 22 individual race wins to its name. Team Kolles joined the championship for the first time in 2009.

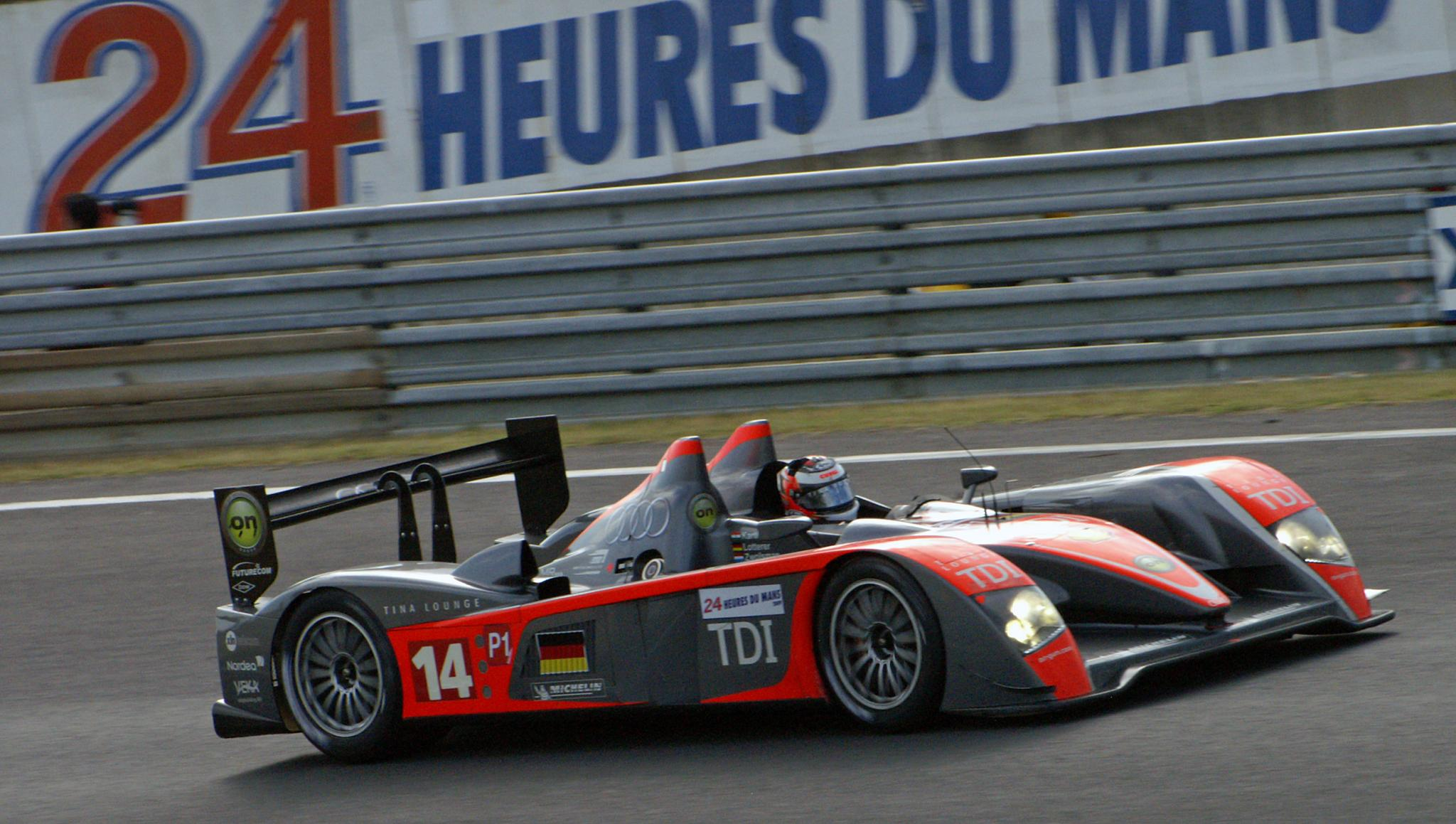
The No. 14 R10 that Karthikeyan drove during the 2009 24 Hours of Le Mans weekend. An injury prevented him from taking part in the race

On 11 May, Karthikeyan finished sixth in his first ever Le Mans series race during the 1000 km of Spa. On 14 June, Karthikeyan dislocated his shoulder in a fall just before the start of the 24 Hours of Le Mans. He had come up with strong performances in the practice and the qualifying, and was scheduled to do the opening double stint. At 1:00 am the ACO organisation declared him unsuitable to drive, even though the Audi doctor approved it.

=== NASCAR ===
Karthikeyan made his NASCAR debut at Martinsville Speedway on 27 March 2010 driving in the Kroger 250 Camping World Truck Series for Wyler Racing in the No. 60 Safe Auto Insurance Company Chevrolet Silverado. Qualifying was rained out and the field set by 2009 owner points, putting the first Indian-born driver to compete in NASCAR in the 11th starting spot. After a slow start and coming to grips with driving a race truck and racing on an American oval short track for the first time, Karthikeyan did manage to put in a very respectable effort and finished on the lead lap in 13th place. Karthikeyan went on to win the NASCAR Camping World Truck Series Most Popular Driver Award for the 2010 season which was voted by the fans, becoming the first foreign-born driver to win the award.

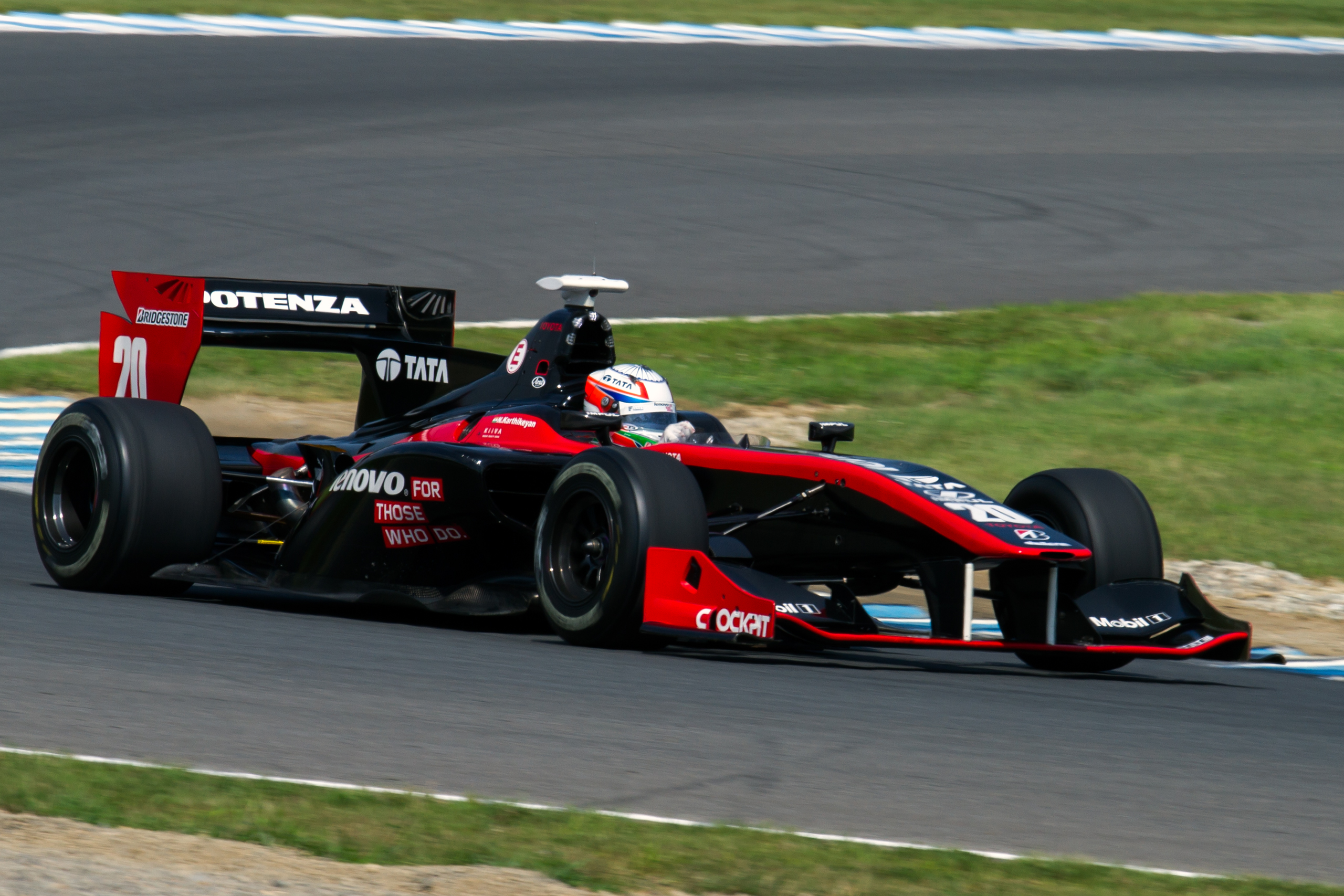
Karthikeyan during the 2014 Super Formula season.

=== Superleague Formula ===
Karthikeyan drove for the PSV Eindhoven team in SLF in 2010. He won the 2nd race at Brands Hatch, Great Britain and finished 16th in the Championship on 288 points, taking part in six of the twelve race weekends.

=== Auto GP ===
Karthikeyan drove for Zele Racing and Super Nova Racing in the Auto GP series in 2013. After switching from Zele Racing to Super Nova Racing, in the latter part of the series, he won five races and secure four pole positions and in the process finished fourth in the championship & became the highest points scorer in the second half of the season.

=== Super Formula ===
In 2014, Karthikeyan returned to the Japanese Top Formula series Super Formula for the first time since 2001 with the same Team IMPUL. In the 2015 season, Karthikeyan moved to Honda-powered Docomo Team Dandelion. Karthikeyan moved to Sunoco Team LeMans for the 2016 season after DoCoMo Dandelion Racing chose McLaren Honda F1 Reserve Stoffel Vandoorne.

=== Super GT ===
In 2019, Karthikeyan raced with Nakajima Racing for one race, winning the Fuji Super GT x DTM Dream Race in Fuji, gaining the fastest lap during the race. He then raced with Modulo Epson NSX-GT Team for 8 races, gaining one podium.

== Awards ==
The Government of India awarded him the fourth highest civilian honour of Padma Shri in 2010.

== Racing record ==
=== Career summary ===
| Season | Series | Team | Races | Wins | Poles | F/Laps | Podiums | Points | Position |
|---|---|---|---|---|---|---|---|---|---|
| 1992 | Indian Formula Maruti | ? | ? | ? | ? | ? | 1 | ? | ? |
| 1992 | Pilote Elf Competition for Formula Renault | ? | ? | 1 | ? | ? | ? | ? | ? |
| 1993 | Indian Formula Maruti | ? | ? | ? | ? | ? | ? | ? | ? |
| 1993 | British Formula Vauxhall Junior | ? | ? | ? | ? | ? | ? | ? | ? |
| 1994 | Formula Ford Zetec | ? | ? | ? | ? | ? | 1 | ? | ? |
| 1994 | British Formula Ford Winter Series | ? | ? | ? | ? | ? | ? | ? | **1st** |
| 1995 | Formula Asia | ? | 4 | ? | ? | ? | ? | ? | ? |
| 1996 | Formula Asia | Marlboro Castrol Meritus Racing Team | ? | ? | ? | ? | ? | ? | **1st** |
| 1997 | British Formula Vauxhall | Nemesis Racing | ? | 1 | ? | ? | 2 | 43 | 8th |
| 1998 | British Formula 3 Championship | Intersport | 4 | 0 | 0 | 0 | 0 | 44 | 12th |
| 1998 | British Formula 3 Championship | Carlin Motorsport | 6 | 0 | 0 | 0 | 2 | 44 | 12th |
| 1998 | Macau Grand Prix | Carlin Motorsport | 1 | 0 | 0 | 0 | 0 | 0 | 11th |
| 1999 | British Formula 3 Championship | Carlin Motorsport | 16 | 2 | 2 | 3 | 4 | 104 | 6th |
| 1999 | Macau Grand Prix | Stewart Racing | 1 | 0 | 0 | 0 | 0 | 0 | 14th |
| 1999 | Masters of Formula 3 | Carlin Motorsport | 1 | 0 | 0 | 0 | 0 | 0 | 16th |
| 1999 | MRF Madras Formula 3 Grand Prix | | 4 | 2 | ? | ? | 2 | ? | **3rd** |
| 1999 | Pau Grand Prix | Carlin Motorsport | 1 | 0 | 0 | 0 | 0 | 0 | NC |
| 1999 | Korea Super Prix | Stewart Racing | 1 | 0 | 0 | 0 | 0 | 0 | NC |
| 2000 | British Formula 3 Championship | Stewart Racing | 14 | 0 | 0 | 0 | 4 | 100 | 4th |
| 2000 | Macau Grand Prix | Stewart Racing | 1 | 0 | 0 | 0 | 0 | 0 | NC |
| 2000 | French Formula 3 Championship | Carlin Motorsport | 2 | 1 | 1 | 0 | 0 | ? | ? |
| 2000 | Masters of Formula 3 | Stewart Racing | 1 | 0 | 0 | 0 | 0 | 0 | 19th |
| 2000 | Korea Super Prix | Carlin Motorsport | 1 | 1 | 1 | 0 | 1 | 0 | **1st** |
| 2001 | Formula Nippon | Team Impul | 10 | 0 | 0 | 0 | 0 | 2 | 14th |
| 2001 | Korea Super Prix | Carlin Motorsport | 1 | 0 | 0 | 0 | 0 | 0 | 9th |
| 2002 | World Series by Nissan | Tata RC Motorsport | 18 | 0 | 1 | 0 | 1 | 51 | 9th |
| 2002 | Macau Grand Prix | Carlin Motorsport | 1 | 0 | 0 | 0 | 0 | 0 | NC |
| 2003 | World Series by Nissan | Carlin Motorsport | 18 | 0 | 0 | 0 | 4 | 121 | 4th |
| 2003 | Macau Grand Prix | Carlin Motorsport | 1 | 0 | 0 | 0 | 0 | 0 | WD |
| 2004 | World Series by Nissan | Tata RC Motorsport | 18 | 2 | 1 | 0 | 4 | 100 | 6th |
| 2004 | FIA GT Championship | Scuderia Veregra | 1 | 0 | 0 | 0 | 0 | 0 | 54th |
| 2005 | Formula One | Jordan Grand Prix | 19 | 0 | 0 | 0 | 0 | 5 | 18th |
| 2006 | Formula One | Williams F1 Team | Test driver | | | | | | |
| 2006–07 | A1 Grand Prix | A1 Team India | 10 | 0 | 0 | 0 | 0 | 13 | 16th |
| 2007 | Formula One | Williams F1 Team | Test driver | | | | | | |
| 2007–08 | A1 Grand Prix | A1 Team India | 18 | 2 | 1 | 0 | 2 | 61 | 10th |
| 2008–09 | A1 Grand Prix | A1 Team India | 12 | 0 | 0 | 0 | 1 | 19 | 12th |
| 2009 | Le Mans Series | Kolles | 4 | 0 | 0 | 0 | 0 | 11 | 19th |
| 2009 | 24 Hours of Le Mans | Kolles | 1 | 0 | 0 | 0 | 0 | N/A | 7th |
| 2010 | Superleague Formula | PSV Eindhoven | 12 | 1 | 1 | 0 | 1 | 288 | 16th |
| 2010 | NASCAR Camping World Truck Series | Wyler Racing | 9 | 0 | 0 | 0 | 0 | 963 | 30th |
| 2011 | Formula One | HRT Formula 1 Team | 9 | 0 | 0 | 0 | 0 | 0 | 26th |
| 2012 | Formula One | HRT Formula 1 Team | 20 | 0 | 0 | 0 | 0 | 0 | 24th |
| 2013 | Auto GP | Zele Racing | 6 | 0 | 0 | 1 | 0 | 195 | 4th |
| 2013 | Auto GP | Super Nova International | 10 | 5 | 4 | 2 | 7 | 195 | 4th |
| 2014 | Super Formula | Lenovo Team Impul | 9 | 0 | 0 | 0 | 0 | 5 | 13th |
| 2015 | Super Formula | Docomo Team Dandelion Racing | 8 | 0 | 0 | 1 | 1 | 6 | 11th |
| 2016 | Super Formula | Sunoco Team LeMans | 9 | 0 | 0 | 1 | 1 | 5 | 14th |
| 2016–17 | MRF Challenge Formula 2000 Championship | MRF Racing | 4 | 0 | 0 | 0 | 0 | 0 | NC† |
| 2017 | Super Formula | TCS Nakajima Racing | 7 | 0 | 0 | 0 | 0 | 0 | 19th |
| 2018 | Super Formula | TCS Nakajima Racing | 6 | 0 | 0 | 0 | 0 | 4 | 15th |
| 2019 | Super GT - GT500 | Modulo Nakajima Racing | 8 | 0 | 0 | 0 | 1 | 23.5 | 12th |
| 2019 | Super GT × DTM Dream Race – Race 2 | Modulo Nakajima Racing | 1 | 1 | 0 | 1 | 1 | N/A | **1st** |
| 2021 | Asian Le Mans Series - LMP2 | Racing Team India | 4 | 0 | 0 | 0 | 0 | 42 | 6th |
| 2025–26 | Asian Le Mans Series - LMP3 | Team Virage | 6 | 0 | 0 | 0 | 0 | 10 | 18th |
| 2026 | Le Mans Cup - LMP3 | Ajith RedAnt Racing | 6 | 0 | 0 | 0 | 0 | 0 | 34th |

^{†} As Karthikeyan was a guest driver, he was ineligible for points.

=== Complete British Formula Three Championship results ===
(key)

| Year | Entrant | Chassis | Engine | Class | 1 | 2 | 3 | 4 | 5 | 6 | 7 | 8 | 9 | 10 | 11 | 12 | 13 | 14 | 15 | 16 | DC | Points |
|---|---|---|---|---|---|---|---|---|---|---|---|---|---|---|---|---|---|---|---|---|---|---|
| 1998 | Intersport | Dallara F398 | Opel Spiess | A | DON; 9 | THR; 9 | SIL; Ret | BRH | BRH | OUL; Ret | SIL | CRO | SNE | SIL | | | | | | | 12th | 44 |
| 1998 | Carlin Motorsport | Dallara F398 | Mugen-Honda | A | | | | | | | | | | | PEM; 6 | PEM; 4 | DON; Ret | THR; Ret | SPA; 3 | SIL; 3 | 12th | 44 |
| 1999 | Carlin Motorsport | Dallara F399 | Mugen-Honda | A | DON; 4 | SIL; Ret | THR; Ret | **BRH**; 2 | **BRH**; 1 | OUL; 13 | CRO; 3 | BRH; 1 | SIL; 5 | SNE; 7 | PEM; 12 | PEM; 7 | DON; Ret | SPA; 12 | SIL; 6 | THR; Ret | 6th | 104 |
| 2000 | Stewart Racing | Dallara F399 | Mugen-Honda | Championship | THR; 3 | CRO; Ret | OUL; 5 | DON; 2 | DON; 8 | SIL; 6 | BRH; 3 | DON; 4 | DON; 10 | CRO; 10 | SIL; 5 | SNE; 5 | SPA; 3 | SIL; Ret | | | 4th | 100 |

=== Complete Formula Nippon/Super Formula results ===
(key)

| Year | Team | Engine | 1 | 2 | 3 | 4 | 5 | 6 | 7 | 8 | 9 | 10 | DC | Points |
|---|---|---|---|---|---|---|---|---|---|---|---|---|---|---|
| 2001 | excite Impul | Mugen | SUZ; 6 | MOT; 7 | MIN; 9 | FUJ; Ret | SUZ; Ret | SUG; 13 | FUJ; 9 | MIN; Ret | MOT; 14 | SUZ; 6 | 14th | 2 |
| 2014 | Lenovo Team Impul | Toyota | SUZ; Ret | FUJ; 7 | FUJ; 6 | FUJ; 7 | MOT; Ret | AUT; 17 | SUG; 11 | SUZ; 10 | SUZ; 8 | | 13th | 5 |
| 2015 | Docomo Team Dandelion Racing | Honda | SUZ; 3 | OKA; 10 | FUJ; Ret | MOT; 9 | AUT; 14 | SUG; 13 | SUZ; 12 | SUZ; 14 | | | 11th | 6 |
| 2016 | Sunoco Team LeMans | Toyota | SUZ; Ret | OKA; 16 | FUJ; 7 | MOT; Ret | OKA; 3 | OKA; Ret | SUG; 12 | SUZ; 15 | SUZ; 14 | | 14th | 5 |
| 2017 | TCS Nakajima Racing | Honda | SUZ; 13 | OKA; 17 | OKA; 13 | FUJ; 14 | MOT; Ret | AUT; Ret | SUG; 13 | SUZ; C | SUZ; C | | 19th | 0 |
| 2018 | TCS Nakajima Racing | Honda | SUZ; 17 | AUT; C | SUG; 5 | FUJ; 16 | MOT; 11 | OKA; 13 | SUZ; 17 | | | | 15th | 4 |

=== Complete World Series by Nissan results ===
(key)

| Year | Entrant | 1 | 2 | 3 | 4 | 5 | 6 | 7 | 8 | 9 | 10 | 11 | 12 | 13 | 14 | 15 | 16 | 17 | 18 | DC | Points |
|---|---|---|---|---|---|---|---|---|---|---|---|---|---|---|---|---|---|---|---|---|---|
| 2002 | Tata RC Motorsport | VAL; 1; 10 | VAL; 2 Ret | JAR; 1; 9 | JAR; 2; 3 | ALB; 1 Ret | ALB; 2 Ret | MNZ; 1; 17 | MNZ; 2 Ret | MAG; 1; 9 | MAG; 2 Ret | CAT; 1 DNS | CAT; 2 DNS | VAL; 1; 5 | VAL; 2; 12 | CUR; 1; 4 | **CUR**; **2**; 9 | INT; 1; 7 | INT; 2; 4 | 9th | 51 |
| 2003 | Tata Carlin Motorsport | JAR; 1 Ret | JAR; 2; 5 | ZOL; 1; 4 | ZOL; 2; 3 | MAG; 1 Ret | MAG; 2; 4 | MNZ; 1; 3 | MNZ; 2; 3 | LAU; 1; 6 | LAU; 2; 4 | A1R; 1 Ret | A1R; 2; 4 | CAT; 1; 4 | CAT; 2; 2 | VAL; 1 Ret | VAL; 2; 9 | JAR; 1; 7 | JAR; 2 Ret | 4th | 121 |
| 2004 | Tata RC Motorsport | JAR; 1; 5 | JAR; 2 Ret | ZOL; 1; 3 | ZOL; 2; 4 | MAG; 1; 1 | MAG; 2; 4 | VAL; 1; 11 | VAL; 2 Ret | LAU; 1; 10 | LAU; 2; 6 | EST; 1 Ret | EST; 2 Ret | CAT; 1; 5 | CAT; 2; 4 | **VAL**; **1**; 1 | VAL; 2; 2 | JER; 1; 5 | JER; 2; 11 | 6th | 100 |

=== Complete Formula One results ===
(key)

| Year | Entrant | Chassis | Engine | 1 | 2 | 3 | 4 | 5 | 6 | 7 | 8 | 9 | 10 | 11 | 12 | 13 | 14 | 15 | 16 | 17 | 18 | 19 | 20 | WDC | Points |
|---|---|---|---|---|---|---|---|---|---|---|---|---|---|---|---|---|---|---|---|---|---|---|---|---|---|
| 2005 | Jordan Grand Prix | Jordan EJ15 | Toyota RVX-05 3.0 V10 | AUS; 15 | MAL; 11 | BHR; Ret | SMR; 12 | ESP; 13 | MON; Ret | EUR; 16 | CAN; Ret | USA; 4 | FRA; 15 | GBR; Ret | GER; 16 | HUN; 12 | TUR; 14 | ITA; 20 | | | | | | 18th | 5 |
| 2005 | Jordan Grand Prix | Jordan EJ15B | Toyota RVX-05 3.0 V10 | | | | | | | | | | | | | | | | BEL; 11 | BRA; 15 | JPN; 15 | CHN; Ret | | 18th | 5 |
| 2011 | Hispania Racing F1 Team | Hispania F111 | Cosworth CA2011 2.4 V8 | AUS; DNQ | MAL; Ret | CHN; 23 | TUR; 21 | ESP; 21 | MON; 17 | CAN; 17 | EUR; 24 | GBR | | | | | | | | | | | | 26th | 0 |
| 2011 | HRT Formula 1 Team | Hispania F111 | Cosworth CA2011 2.4 V8 | | | | | | | | | | GER; TD | HUN | BEL | ITA | SIN; TD | JPN; TD | KOR; TD | IND; 17 | ABU | BRA | | 26th | 0 |
| 2012 | HRT Formula 1 Team | HRT F112 | Cosworth CA2012 2.4 V8 | AUS; DNQ | MAL; 22 | CHN; 22 | BHR; 21 | ESP; Ret | MON; 15 | CAN; Ret | EUR; 18 | GBR; 21 | GER; 23 | HUN; Ret | BEL; Ret | ITA; 19 | SIN; Ret | JPN; Ret | KOR; 20 | IND; 21 | ABU; Ret | USA; 22 | BRA; 18 | 24th | 0 |

=== Complete A1 Grand Prix results ===
(key) (Races in bold indicate pole position) (Races in italics indicate fastest lap)

| Year | Entrant | 1 | 2 | 3 | 4 | 5 | 6 | 7 | 8 | 9 | 10 | 11 | 12 | 13 | 14 | 15 | 16 | 17 | 18 | 19 | 20 | 21 | 22 | DC | Points |
|---|---|---|---|---|---|---|---|---|---|---|---|---|---|---|---|---|---|---|---|---|---|---|---|---|---|
| 2006–07 | India | NED; SPR | NED; FEA | CZE; SPR | CZE; FEA | CHN; SPR | CHN; FEA | MYS; SPR | MYS; FEA | IDN; SPR | IDN; FEA | NZL; SPR; 10 | NZL; FEA; 7 | AUS; SPR | AUS; FEA | RSA; SPR; 15 | RSA; FEA; 9 | MEX; SPR; 11 | MEX; FEA; 18 | CHN; SPR; 7 | CHN; FEA; 17 | GBR; SPR; 7 | GBR; SPR; 4 | 16th | 13 |
| 2007–08 | India | NED; SPR; 10 | NED; FEA; Ret | CZE; SPR; 21 | CZE; FEA; 9 | MYS; SPR; 11 | MYS; FEA; 6 | CHN; SPR; 7 | CHN; FEA; 1 | NZL; SPR; 10 | NZL; FEA; Ret | AUS; SPR; 11 | AUS; FEA; 11 | RSA; SPR | RSA; FEA | MEX; SPR; 13 | MEX; FEA; 9 | CHN; SPR; 5 | CHN; FEA; 7 | GBR; SPR; 5 | **GBR**; **FEA**; 1 | | | 10th | 61 |
| 2008–09 | India | NED; SPR | NED; FEA | CHN; SPR; 10 | CHN; FEA; 10 | MYS; SPR; Ret | MYS; FEA; Ret | NZL; SPR; 9 | NZL; FEA; 7 | RSA; SPR; 6 | RSA; FEA; 12 | POR; SPR; 6 | POR; FEA; 11 | GBR; SPR; 2 | GBR; FEA; Ret | | | | | | | | | 12th | 19 |

=== Complete Le Mans Series results ===
(key) (Races in bold indicate pole position) (Races in italics indicate fastest lap)

| Year | Entrant | Car | Engine | Class | 1 | 2 | 3 | 4 | 5 | DC | Points |
|---|---|---|---|---|---|---|---|---|---|---|---|
| 2009 | Kolles | Audi R10 TDI | Audi TDI 5.5 L Turbo V12 (Diesel) | LMP1 | CAT | SPA; 6 | ALG; NC | NUR; 4 | SIL; 6 | 22nd | 11 |

=== 24 Hours of Le Mans results ===
| Year | Team | Co-Drivers | Car | Class | Laps | Pos. | Class Pos. |
|---|---|---|---|---|---|---|---|
| 2009 | (Germany) Kolles | (Netherlands) Charles Zwolsman Jr. (Germany) André Lotterer | Audi R10 TDI | LMP1 | N/A | DNS (Note: Karthikeyan was nominated as the starting driver for the No. 14 Kolles entry, but dislocated his shoulder going over the pitwall before the formation lap. He was unable to take part in the race and was therefore not credited with the seventh place his teammates achieved.) | |

=== Superleague Formula ===
(key) (Races in bold indicate pole position) (Races in italics indicate fastest lap)

| Year | Team | 1 | 2 | 3 | 4 | 5 | 6 | 7 | 8 | 9 | 10 | 11 | 12 | 13 | 14 | 15 | 16 | 17 | 18 | 19 | 20 | 21 | 22 | 23 | 24 | Pos | Pts |
|---|---|---|---|---|---|---|---|---|---|---|---|---|---|---|---|---|---|---|---|---|---|---|---|---|---|---|---|
| 2010 | PSV Eindhoven Atech GP/Reid Motorsport | SIL; 1; 12 | SIL; 2; 15 | ASS; 1; 13 | ASS; 2; 9 | MAG; 1 | MAG; 2 | JAR; 1; 11 | JAR; 2; 15 | NÜR; 1; 13 | NÜR; 2; 16 | ZOL; 1; 10 | ZOL; 2; 14 | BRH; 1; 18 | **BRH**; **2**; 1 | ADR; 1 | ADR; 2 | POR; 1 | POR; 2 | ORD; 1 | ORD; 2 | BEI; 1 | BEI; 2 | NAV; 1 | NAV; 2 | 16th | 288 |

=== Super Final results ===
(key) (Races in bold indicate pole position) (Races in italics indicate fastest lap)

| Year | Team | 1 | 2 | 3 | 4 | 5 | 6 | 7 | 8 | 9 | 10 | 11 | 12 |
|---|---|---|---|---|---|---|---|---|---|---|---|---|---|
| 2010 | PSV Eindhoven Atech GP/Reid Motorsport | SIL; DNQ | ASS; DNQ | MAG | JAR; DNQ | NÜR; DNQ | ZOL; DNQ | BRH; DNQ | ADR | POR | ORD | BEI | NAV |

=== Complete Auto GP results ===
(key) (Races in bold indicate pole position) (Races in italics indicate fastest lap)

| Year | Entrant | 1 | 2 | 3 | 4 | 5 | 6 | 7 | 8 | 9 | 10 | 11 | 12 | 13 | 14 | 15 | 16 | Pos | Points |
|---|---|---|---|---|---|---|---|---|---|---|---|---|---|---|---|---|---|---|---|
| 2013 | Zele Racing | MNZ; 1; 5 | MNZ; 2 Ret | MAR; 1; 6 | MAR; 2 Ret | HUN; 1; 8 | HUN; 2; 4 | | | | | | | | | | | 4th | 195 |
| 2013 | Super Nova International | | | | | | | **SIL**; **1**; 1 | SIL; 2; 12 | **MUG**; **1**; 3 | MUG; 2; 1 | **NÜR**; **1**; 1 | NÜR; 2; 5 | **DON**; **1**; 2 | DON; 2; 1 | BRN; 1; 1 | BRN; 2 DSQ | 4th | 195 |

=== Complete Super GT results ===
(key) (Races in bold indicate pole position; races in italics indicate fastest lap)

| Year | Team | Car | Class | 1 | 2 | 3 | 4 | 5 | 6 | 7 | 8 | DC | Points |
|---|---|---|---|---|---|---|---|---|---|---|---|---|---|
| 2019 | Modulo Nakajima Racing | Honda NSX-GT | GT500 | OKA; 10 | FUJ; 10 | SUZ; 11 | CHA; 10 | FUJ; 10 | AUT; 7 | SUG; 2 | MOT; 12 | 12th | 23.5 |

=== Complete Asian Le Mans Series results ===
(key) (Races in bold indicate pole position) (Races in italics indicate fastest lap)

| Year | Entrant | Car | Engine | Class | 1 | 2 | 3 | 4 | 5 | 6 | DC | Points |
|---|---|---|---|---|---|---|---|---|---|---|---|---|
| 2021 | Racing Team India | Oreca 07 | Gibson GK428 4.2 L V8 | LMP2 | DUB; 1; 5 | DUB; 2; 4 | ABU; 1; 5 | ABU; 2; 5 | | | 5th | 42 |
| 2025–26 | Team Virage | Ligier JS P325 | Toyota V35A 3.5 L Turbo V6 | LMP3 | SEP; 1 NC | SEP; 2; 8 | DUB; 1; 7 | DUB; 2 NC | ABU; 1 Ret | ABU; 2 Ret | 18th | 10 |

=== NASCAR ===
(key) (Bold – Pole position awarded by qualifying time. Italics – Pole position earned by points standings or practice time. * – Most laps led.)

==== Camping World Truck Series ====
NASCAR Camping World Truck Series results
| Year | Team | No. | Make | 1 | 2 | 3 | 4 | 5 | 6 | 7 | 8 | 9 | 10 | 11 | 12 | 13 | 14 | 15 | 16 | 17 | 18 | 19 | 20 | 21 | 22 | 23 | 24 | 25 | NCWTC | Pts | Ref |
|---|---|---|---|---|---|---|---|---|---|---|---|---|---|---|---|---|---|---|---|---|---|---|---|---|---|---|---|---|---|---|---|
| 2010 | Wyler Racing | 60 | Chevy | DAY | ATL | MAR; 13 | NSH | KAN; 36 | DOV | CLT; 17 | TEX; 11 | MCH | IOW | GTY | IRP; 20 | POC | NSH; 17 | DAR | BRI | CHI; 14 | KEN | NHA | LVS; 27 | MAR | TAL; 13 | TEX | PHO | HOM | 30th | 963 | |

== See also ==
- Formula One drivers from India
- List of Asian NASCAR drivers
- TorqueX

== Notes ==
Achievements
| Preceded by Ricky Carmichael | NASCAR Camping World Truck Series Most Popular Driver; 2010 | Succeeded by Austin Dillon |
