= 2012 Spanish Grand Prix =

Formula One motor race held in 2012

Race 5 of 20 in the 2012 Formula One World Championship
← Previous race	Next race →
- Circuit de Catalunya

Race details
- Date: 13 May 2012
- Official name: Formula 1 Gran Premio de España Santander 2012
- Location: Circuit de Catalunya, Montmeló, Catalonia, Spain
- Course: Permanent racing facility
- Course length: 4.655 km (2.892 miles)
- Distance: 66 laps, 307.104 km (190.826 (Note: There is a 0.126 km (0.078 mi) offset between the start and finish lines.) miles)
- Weather: Partially cloudy, dry: Air 23 °C (73 °F), Track 36 °C (97 °F)
- Attendance: 82,000

Pole position
Driver	(Venezuela) Pastor Maldonado	Williams-Renault
- Time: 1:22.285

Fastest lap
Driver	(France) Romain Grosjean	Lotus-Renault
- Time: 1:26.250 on lap 53

Podium
First	(Venezuela) Pastor Maldonado	Williams-Renault
Second	(Spain) Fernando Alonso	Ferrari
Third	(Finland) Kimi Räikkönen	Lotus-Renault

The 2012 Spanish Grand Prix (formally the Formula 1 Gran Premio de España Santander 2012) was a Formula One motor race held on 13 May 2012, at the Circuit de Catalunya in Montmeló, Spain, attended by 82,000 people. It was the fifth round of the 2012 Formula One World Championship and the 22nd Spanish Grand Prix at the track. Williams's Pastor Maldonado won the 66-lap event from pole position, with Ferrari's Fernando Alonso second and Lotus's Kimi Räikkönen third.

Sebastian Vettel entered the race as the World Drivers' Championship leader while his team Red Bull were top of the World Constructors' Championship. Lewis Hamilton in his McLaren was fastest in qualifying; he was excluded from the qualifying results for breaking the technical regulations on fuel, forcing him to begin the race from the back of the grid. Maldonado thus inherited pole position, but was overtaken by Alonso at the start of the Grand Prix. After the first two cycles of pit stops for fresh tyres, Maldonado undercut Alonso, who remained out for two more laps and was delayed by a slower driver during the second pit stop cycle. On lap 41, Maldonado's third pit stop was slow due to a tyre fitting fault and he lost his lead, but he retook it again by passing Räikkönen on lap 47. Alonso overtook Räikkönen on the following lap as well, and drew close to Maldonado; he could not pass Maldonado who maintained the lead for the rest of the race and achieved his maiden and only Formula One win. Alonso finished 3.1 seconds behind in second place and Räikkönen took third after being put on an alternate strategy intended to give him victory.

The race was Williams's first victory since Juan Pablo Montoya won the 2004 Brazilian Grand Prix, and is their last one as of 2026. Maldonado was the fifth race winner in the season's first five races. As of 2026, he is the only Venezuelan driver to have won a Formula One race. Following the race, Vettel and Alonso shared the World Drivers' Championship lead with 61 championship points each. Hamilton finished eighth, dropping from second to third, while Räikkönen advanced from seventh to fourth. With 15 races remaining in the season, Red Bull maintained its World Constructors' Championship lead over McLaren and Lotus with 109 championship points.

== Background ==
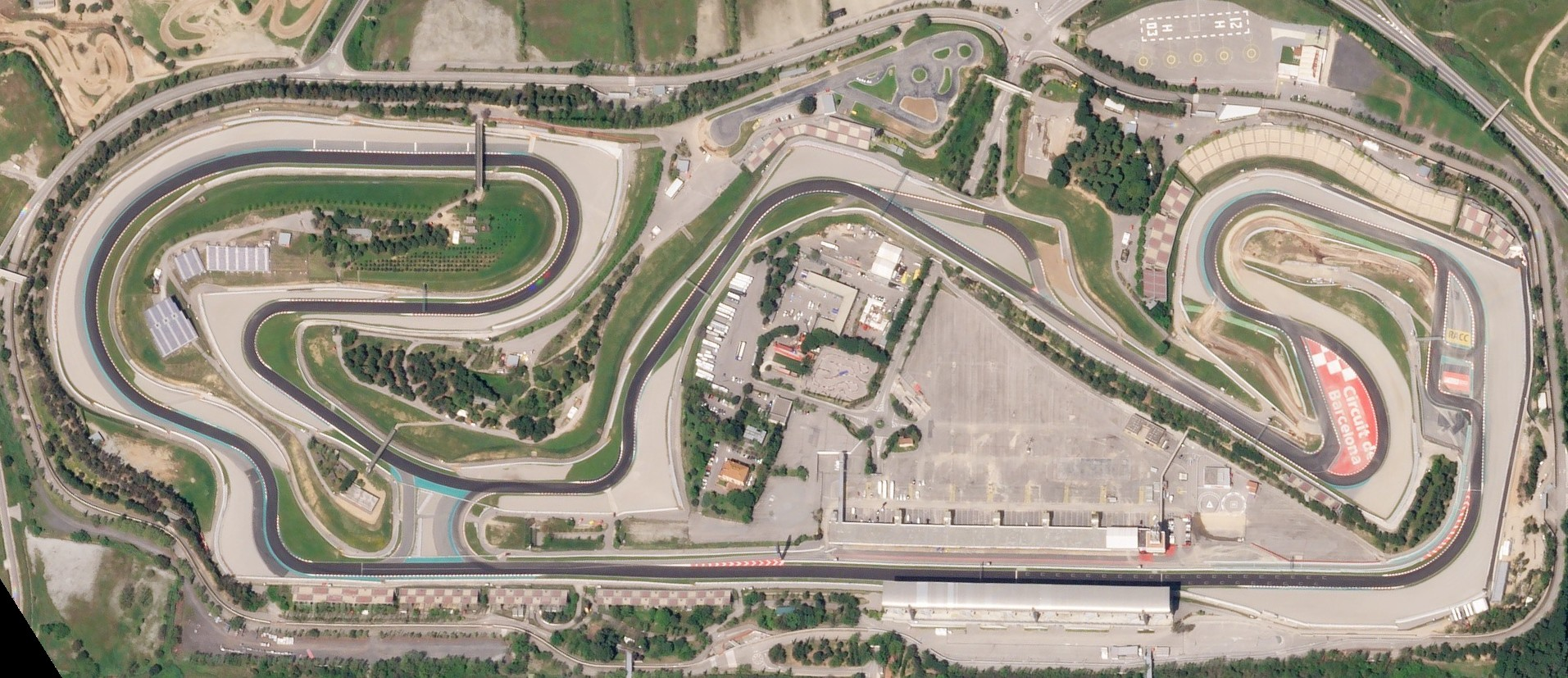
The Circuit de Barcelona, where the race was held

The 2012 Spanish Grand Prix, held on 13 May, was the fifth of 20 races in the 2012 Formula One World Championship and the 22nd at the 16-turn 4.655 km (2.892 mi) Circuit de Catalunya in Montmeló, Catalonia, 25 km (16 mi) north of Barcelona, three weeks after the preceding race in Bahrain. Tyre supplier Pirelli in their second season of Formula One brought the yellow banded soft and the silver-banded hard dry compound tyres to the race. McLaren team principal Martin Whitmarsh and Mercedes' Michael Schumacher criticised Pirelli for the extreme sensitivity of their tyres, and brought a different set of tyres to better demonstrate a difference in performance and tyre durability. The single drag reduction system (DRS) activation zone was placed on the straight linking the final and first corners. For the race, 1 m (3.3 ft) of artificial grass was installed on turn three's verge and the turn five exit kerb was lengthened by 50 m (160 ft).

Before the race, Red Bull's Sebastian Vettel led the World Drivers' Championship with 53 championship points, ahead of McLaren's Lewis Hamilton and Vettel's teammate Mark Webber in second and third. Hamilton's teammate Jenson Button and Ferrari's Fernando Alonso tied for fourth position with 43 championship points. Red Bull led the World Constructors' Championship with 101 championship points, followed by McLaren and Lotus with 92 and 57 championship points, respectively. Ferrari were fourth with 45 championship points and Mercedes were fifth with 37 championship points.

From 1 to 3 May, the teams conducted a three-day test at the Mugello Circuit in Italy ahead of the Spanish Grand Prix. The test allowed teams to assess major aerodynamic and mechanical upgrades as well as tyre behaviour. The HRT team chose not to participate in the test, instead focusing on establishing their new headquarters at the Caja Mágica in Madrid. Alonso was fastest on the first day of testing on a drying circuit. Lotus' Romain Grosjean and Sauber's Kamui Kobayashi set identical lap times to go quickest on the second day of testing. Vettel was quickest on the morning of the final day and Grosjean led the afternoon session.

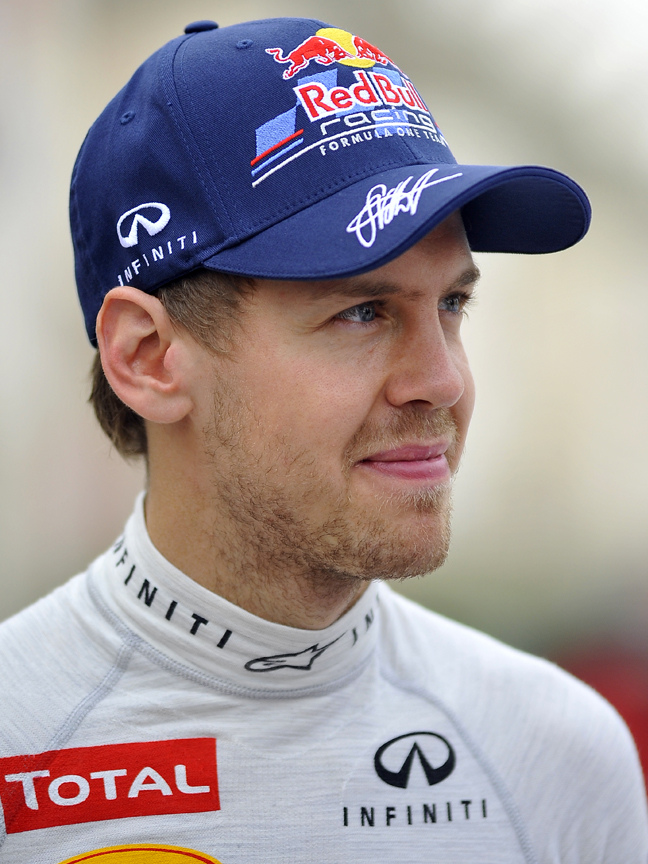
Sebastian Vettel, the World Drivers' Championship leader, coming into the race

The championship had been tumultuous thus far, with four different drivers winning the first four rounds. Red Bull team principal Christian Horner said he felt consistency across races which teams could not win would determine the championship winner:

We've consistently managed to be scoring pretty decent points in the first four races. We've had four fourth places with Mark (Webber), we've had a second, a first, a fifth and an 11th with Sebastian dropping that place with the backmarker [in Malaysia]. And that puts us into the lead of the drivers' and constructors' championship after the flyways, which is certainly not what we were expecting after the first couple of races, so it just shows if you maintain your focus and teamwork, that it can pay dividends.

Alonso had won the mixed-weather affected Malaysian Grand Prix before finishing no higher than seventh in the next two races, dropping him ten championship points behind Vettel in the Drivers' Championship. He said that updates to his car could potentially improve his performance in Spain, but he was unsure: "Having said that, it's not the case that if we are not on pole in Barcelona then it's the end of the world." After finishing second at the preceding Bahrain Grand Prix, Räikkönen said his objective was to win the race in Spain: "That is the target for me and the team. We want to win grands prix. We have a good car and we saw in Bahrain it is good enough to win. That's the target." Hamilton believed passing would be difficult in Spain and hoped to achieve a good qualifying performance for an easier race, saying: "It's always been a tough place for passing – as I found out last year – but I really hope DRS and KERS-Hybrid combined will make it a little easier."

There were no changes from the season entry list for the 12 teams (each representing a different constructor). There were four driver changes for the first practice session. Dani Clos, a HRT test driver, was allowed to drive Narain Karthikeyan's HRT F112 car in an official Formula One session for the first time by team principal Luis Pérez-Sala. Alexander Rossi of the Formula Renault 3.5 Series made his practice debut in Heikki Kovalainen's Caterham CT01 car. He was the first American to partake in a Formula One race weekend since Scott Speed in 2007. Williams reserve driver and 2011 GP3 Series champion Valtteri Bottas drove Bruno Senna's car, and Force India reserve driver Jules Bianchi replaced Paul di Resta.

== Practice ==
The 2012 season's regulations scheduled three practice sessions: two 90-minute sessions on Friday morning and afternoon, and another 60-minute session on Saturday morning. Alonso lapped fastest at 1:24.430 with 21 minutes remaining in the first practice session, which took place in clear and warm weather, followed by Vettel, who led for 15 minutes, Kobayashi, Button, Bottas, Mercedes driver Michael Schumacher, Grosjean, Hamilton, Räikkönen and Force India's Nico Hülkenberg. Pedro de la Rosa's HRT car bottomed out braking for the first corner and removing the right-rear bargeboard, which was later retrieved from turn one. Clos stopped with a car mechanical problem at the top of the conclusion of the entry to the pit lane.

Conditions warmed in the second session on Friday afternoon. Button, driving with a chronic understeer, set the day's fastest lap of 1:23.399 seconds on the soft compound tyres with 55 minutes remaining. Vettel duplicated his first practice result in second, Mercedes' Nico Rosberg was third and Hamilton improved to fourth. The Lotus duo of Räikkönen and Grosjean were fifth and sixth and Webber, Schumacher, Kobayashi and Hülkenberg followed in the top ten. Teams conducted simulations on how their cars would behave in the race. Some drivers ran off the track during the session. Webber carried excess speed and drove onto the turn four gravel trap. The floor of Webber's RB8 car accumulated gravel and stones deposited on the racing line after rejoining the circuit via an area of grass between the gravel and a tyre wall. Sergio Pérez went off the track at the same corner in his Sauber car.

The third session took place in warm and dry weather on Saturday morning. Several drivers led before Vettel set the session's fastest time, a 1:23.168 on the soft compound tyres. Williams driver Pastor Maldonado was second and Kobayashi improved to third. Webber, Pérez, Alonso, Toro Rosso driver Jean-Éric Vergne, Button, Räikkönen and Rosberg made up positions four to ten. Grosjean's Lotus car lost power due to a sudden loss of fuel pressure, causing his engine to stall 17 minutes into the session at turn ten. His session ended early because mechanics were unable to rectify the problem. After the session, stewards summoned Schumacher and Hamilton to discuss an incident in which the latter ran wide at turn 13 and rejoined the track in front of the former before slowing at the apex of turn 15. The stewards reprimanded Schumacher after agreeing it was a minor incident.

== Qualifying ==
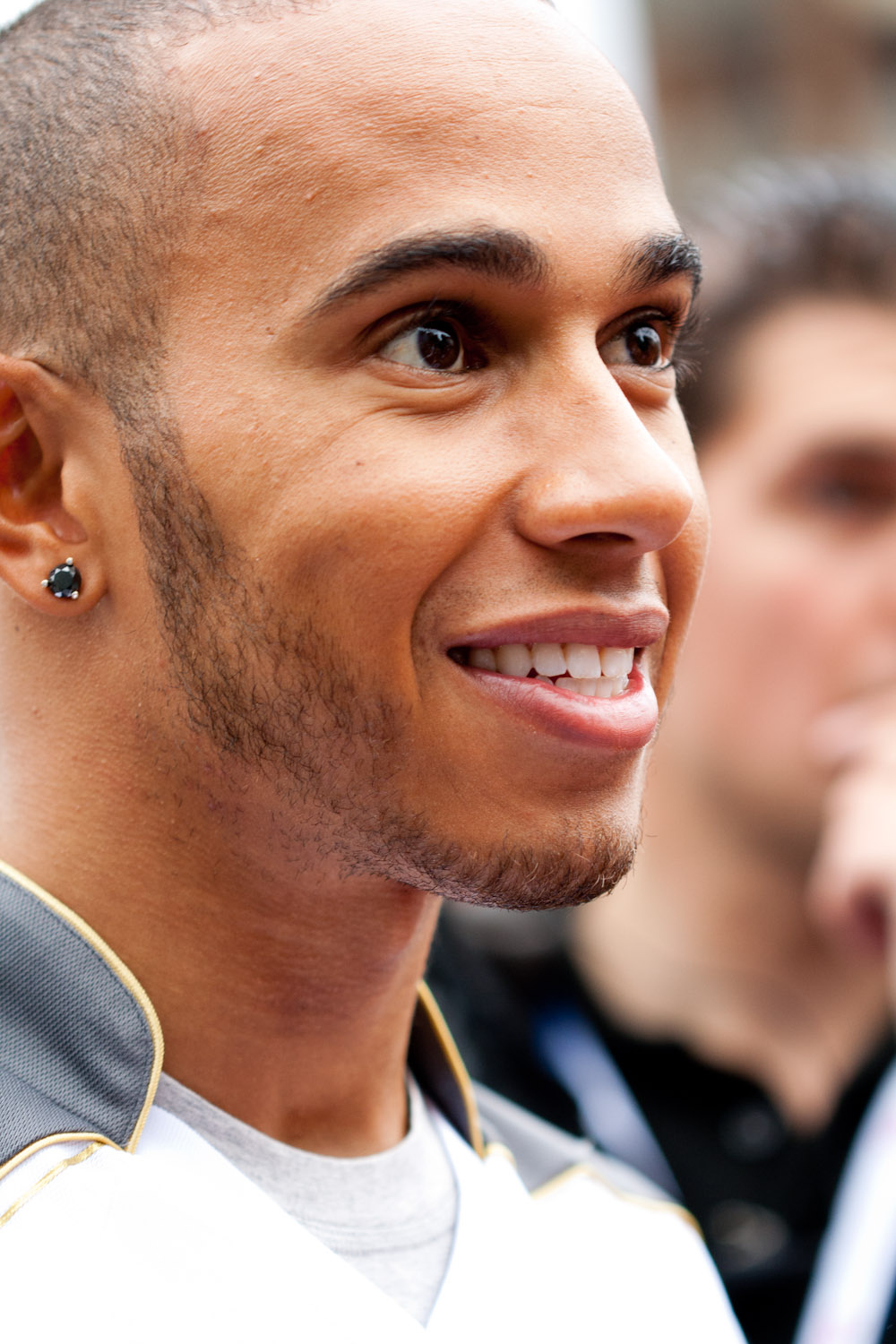
Lewis Hamilton qualified fastest but began from the back of the grid for breaking fuel regulations.

Saturday afternoon's qualifying session was split into three parts. The first session ran for 20 minutes, eliminating cars that finished 18th or lower. The second session lasted 15 minutes, eliminating cars that finished 11th to 17th. The final ten-minute session determined pole position to tenth. Cars that qualified for the final session had to start the race on the tyres with which they set their quickest lap times in the session. Conditions were warm and dry for qualifying. The track improved by about eight-tenths of a second per lap, rather than the usual three-tenths. Unlike other fast drivers, Hamilton completed two timed laps and beat Alonso and Maldonado to claim his provisional third pole position of 2012, 22nd of his career, and McLaren's 150th in Formula One with a time of 1:21.707 seconds. Maldonado, who was fastest in the second session, qualified provisional second despite an untidy lap while Alonso saved a set of soft tyres and set the third-fastest lap. Grosjean took fourth using a setup learned the day before by Lotus. His teammate Räikkönen, fifth, made minor errors during his lap on the soft tyres. Pérez, sixth, was the faster Sauber driver, with Rosberg seventh after a lap set early in the third session on a new set of left-hand tyres and right-hand compounds. Vettel and Schumacher in eighth and ninth both elected not to complete a full lap in the third session as a tyre-saving measure for the race. Kobayashi, tenth, suffered a hydraulic leak en route to the pit lane at the end of the second session, prompting Sauber to instruct him to stop his car to ensure no further damage was sustained.

Button, 11th, was the fastest driver not to qualify for the final session due to an unbalanced car with understeer in high-speed corners and an unstable rear entering slower-speed turns when McLaren added angle to his front wing. Red Bull misjudged how much the track would improve as Webber tried to save a set of tyres. Webber was told to not exit the pit lane for a second timed lap, leaving him 12th after going second early in the second session. Force India's Di Resta and Hülkenberg were 13th and 14th; Di Resta's car's aerodynamic balance was changed for his final lap of the second session. Vergne (15th) qualified ahead of teammate Ricciardo (16th) for the first time in 2012 after Toro Rosso modified their cars overnight. Ferrari's Felipe Massa, 17th, registered his lowest starting position since the 2010 Singapore Grand Prix due to heavy traffic during his preparation and slowing his final timed lap of the second session. Senna, 18th, spun his car into the gravel trap at turn 12 in an attempt to qualify for the second session at the end of the first. Vitaly Petrov, 19th, located a balance on the soft tyres and kinetic energy recovery system (KERS) mapping made him happier braking in his Caterham but ran wide at turn three. He qualified ahead of his teammate Kovalainen in 20th for the first time in 2012; Kovalainen lost time through an error at turn three. Charles Pic, 21st, beat his Marussia teammate Timo Glock in 22nd by four-tenths of a second, due to an error and tyre issues. An improved car balance put De la Rosa in 23rd, while a flat-spotted tyre caused by Karthikeyan spinning at turn three hindered his teammate. Karthikeyan failed to qualify within 107 percent of Hamilton's fastest time in the first session due to a loose rooftop cowling housing a camera.

=== Post-qualifying ===
After his last third session lap, Whitmarsh decided that Hamilton had to be instructed to stop his car en route to the pit lane due to a lack of fuel to provide the Fédération Internationale de l'Automobile (FIA; Formula One's governing body) a sample, since the refuelling mechanic mistakenly turned a switch to drain Hamilton's car of fuel rather than add some in. The FIA technical delegate reported Hamilton to the stewards for the irregularity. McLaren technical director Sam Michael argued to the stewards that force majeure caused Hamilton to stop on the track; they rejected the argument and deemed the team to have broken the technical regulations on refuelling requiring teams to provide a 1 L (0.22 imp gal; 0.26 US gal) sample of fuel when drivers returned to the pit lane at the conclusion of qualifying. Hamilton was therefore ordered to start at the back of the grid and every driver behind him gained one position. This gave Maldonado the first pole position of his career and the Williams team their first since the 2010 Brazilian Grand Prix. The stewards allowed Karthikeyan to start the race after determining that he could lap within the 107 percent limit in the third practice session.

=== Qualifying classification ===
The fastest lap in each of the three sessions is denoted in bold.

Pos	No.	Driver	Constructor	Q1	Q2	Q3	Grid
1	18	(Venezuela) Pastor Maldonado	Williams-Renault	1:23.380	**1:22.105**	1:22.285	1
2	5	(Spain) Fernando Alonso	Ferrari	1:23.276	1:22.862	1:22.302	2
3	10	(France) Romain Grosjean	Lotus-Renault	1:23.248	1:22.667	1:22.424	3
4	9	(Finland) Kimi Räikkönen	Lotus-Renault	1:23.406	1:22.856	1:22.487	4
5	15	(Mexico) Sergio Pérez	Sauber-Ferrari	1:24.261	1:22.773	1:22.533	5
6	8	(Germany) Nico Rosberg	Mercedes	1:23.370	1:22.882	1:23.005	6
7	1	(Germany) Sebastian Vettel	Red Bull-Renault	1:23.850	1:22.884	No Time	7
8	7	(Germany) Michael Schumacher	Mercedes	1:23.757	1:22.904	No Time	8
9	14	(Japan) Kamui Kobayashi	Sauber-Ferrari	1:23.386	1:22.897	No Time	9
10	3	(United Kingdom) Jenson Button	McLaren-Mercedes	1:23.510	1:22.944	N/A	10
11	2	(Australia) Mark Webber	Red Bull-Renault	1:23.592	1:22.977	N/A	11
12	11	(United Kingdom) Paul di Resta	Force India-Mercedes	1:23.852	1:23.125	N/A	12
13	12	(Germany) Nico Hülkenberg	Force India-Mercedes	1:23.720	1:23.177	N/A	13
14	17	(France) Jean-Éric Vergne	Toro Rosso-Ferrari	1:24.362	1:23.265	N/A	14
15	16	(Australia) Daniel Ricciardo	Toro Rosso-Ferrari	1:23.906	1:23.442	N/A	15
16	6	(Brazil) Felipe Massa	Ferrari	1:23.886	1:23.444	N/A	16
17	19	(Brazil) Bruno Senna	Williams-Renault	1:24.981	N/A	N/A	17
18	21	(Russia) Vitaly Petrov	Caterham-Renault	1:25.277	N/A	N/A	18
19	20	(Finland) Heikki Kovalainen	Caterham-Renault	1:25.507	N/A	N/A	19
20	25	(France) Charles Pic	Marussia-Cosworth	1:26.582	N/A	N/A	20
21	24	(Germany) Timo Glock	Marussia-Cosworth	1:27.032	N/A	N/A	21
22	22	(Spain) Pedro de la Rosa	HRT-Cosworth	1:27.555	N/A	N/A	22
EX	4	(United Kingdom) Lewis Hamilton	McLaren-Mercedes	**1:22.583**	1:22.465	**1:21.707**	24^{1}
107% time: 1:28.363
—	23	(India) Narain Karthikeyan	HRT-Cosworth	1:31.122	N/A	N/A	23^{2}

Notes

- **^1** – Lewis Hamilton was excluded from qualifying and demoted to the back of the grid for breaking refuelling regulations by failing to provide the FIA with enough fuel for analysis.
- **^2** – Narain Karthikeyan failed to set a lap time within 107 per cent of the fastest lap time in the first session. He was allowed to start the race at the discretion of the stewards.

== Race ==
The race, attended by 82,000 spectators, began at 14:00 local time. A lightning thunderstorm fell on the track overnight, but the weather cleared and became overcast before the race start. The air temperature was between 22 and 23 °C (72 and 73 °F) and the track temperature from 32 to 35 °C (90 to 95 °F); weather forecasts predicted rain during the event. Every driver began on the soft compound tyres; due to improved tyre wear in 2012, it appeared that drivers would make three pit stops rather than the four observed in 2011. When the race commenced, Maldonado's clutch slipped more than he expected and he turned right to block Alonso. He pushed Alonso onto the grass, but the latter kept accelerating and passed Maldonado on the inside into the first corner. Pérez overtook Grosjean but the two collided, puncturing the former's rear-left tyre. He controlled the car on the outside of turn three. At turn four, Rosberg overtook Grosjean for fourth place, and Rosberg's teammate Schumacher began challenging Grosjean for sixth soon after passing Vettel for seventh. By the end of the first lap, Hamilton had advanced from 24th to 20th, while Massa had gained five positions.

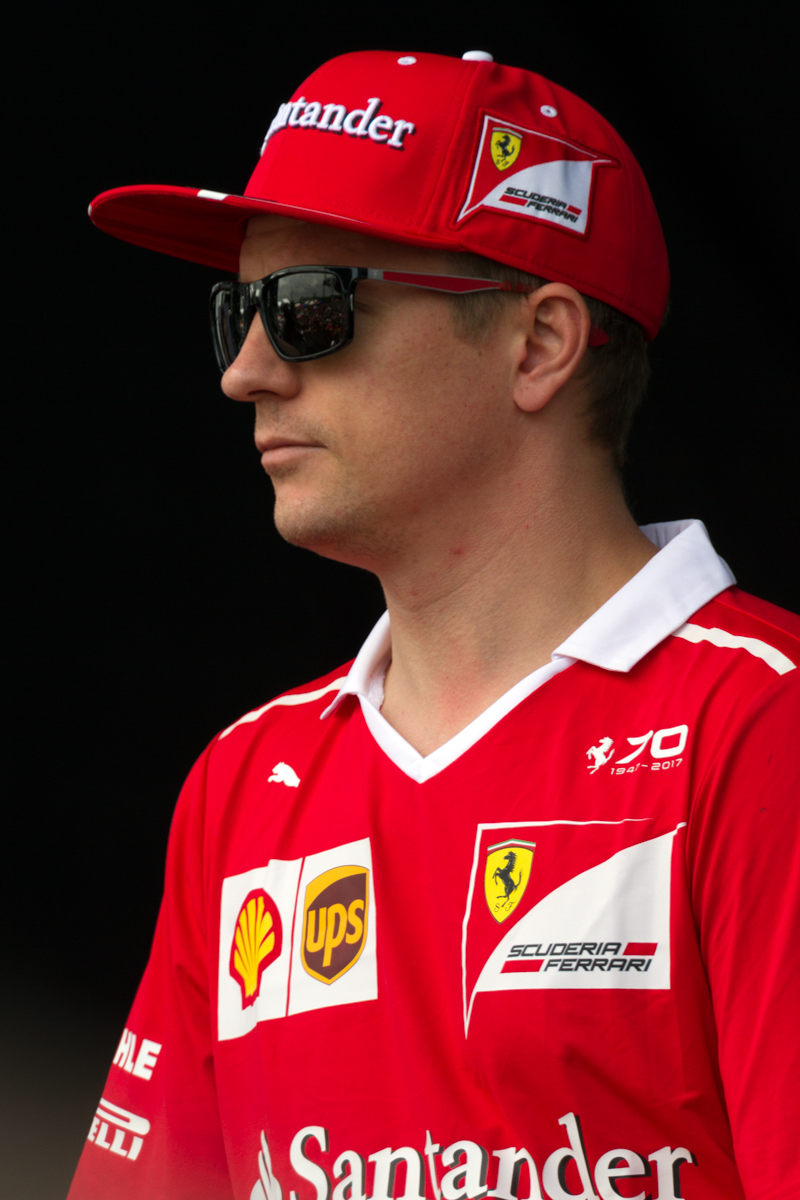
Kimi Räikkönen (pictured in 2017) finished third for the Lotus team

At the first lap's conclusion, Alonso led Maldonado by 1.3 seconds with Räikkönen third, Rosberg fourth and Grosjean fifth. Pérez made a pit stop to switch to the hard compound tyres and rejoined the race at the back of the field. Pic lost control of his car exiting turn three but continued without other drivers striking his car. At the front, Maldonado spent the first laps trailing Alonso, not attempting to pass him but staying as far back as possible to avoid being affected by Alonso's Ferrari's aerodynamic turbulence, avoiding tyre damage, and determining where his car was strong and weak in comparison to the Ferrari. Alonso was unable to pull clear of Maldonado and began reporting left-hand tyre wear on lap six. On the next lap, Webber was the first driver to make a scheduled pit stop for the hard compound tyres in an attempt to pass Massa without any aerodynamic turbulence affecting his car. Vettel, Webber's teammate, followed with a pit stop on the eighth lap and rejoined the race in 18th on hard compound tyres. Webber had previously almost been caught out and avoided colliding with the rear of an early braking Karthikeyan while attempting to pass him. Kobayashi, Rosberg and Button made their pit stops over the following two laps.

Hamilton forced Hülkenberg into a driving error at turn nine and moved into 11th on lap nine. Alonso led Maldonado by 1.1 seconds at the end of lap ten and made his first pit stop for new hard compound tyres. He rejoined in third, while Maldonado took the lead. At the end of the 11th lap, Maldonado made his first pit stop to replace his old soft compound tyres, with Räikkönen in second. As Alonso retook first, the two exited the pit lane second and third on hard and soft compound tyres, respectively. Räikkönen and teammate Grosjean drove on used soft tyres because Lotus anticipated a larger lap time difference between hard and soft tyres. On lap 12, after Rosberg overtook the yet-to-stop Senna, Grosjean went to the outside of Senna, and the two collided at the first corner, removing part of Grosjean's front wing. Schumacher attempted to draw close to Senna braking for the first corner on the next lap, but he struck the rear of Senna's vehicle after a late attacking move. Schumacher abandoned his car in the gravel with the front wing folded underneath, and Senna retired further around the track.

On the 15th lap, Hamilton had a problematic pit stop from fourth. He struck a detached left-rear tyre leaving his pit box, lifting his car into the air and dropping him to 14th in the race order. Grosjean used DRS to pass Rosberg on the outside for sixth into turn one on the next lap; Rosberg's delay meant Grosjean was 20 seconds behind teammate Räikkönen. Webber lost front load on his front wing, slowing him and dropping him from 9th to 14th behind di Resta, Vergne, Massa, Hülkenberg and Hamilton during lap 17. He made a pit stop for a front wing replacement on the following lap and fell to 17th. At the front, Maldonado lapped faster than Alonso, narrowing the gap from 2.3 seconds to 1.5 seconds by the time Williams chief strategist Mark Barnett asked him to make a second pit stop for a new set of hard compound tyres on the 25th lap. Maldonado rejoined in third, eight seconds behind Räikkönen. Barnett calculated Maldonado could drive 42 laps on his current set of tyres and do another pit stop without losing speed. Karthikeyan had a wheel problem and had to retire to the side of the track near the pit lane inside exit.

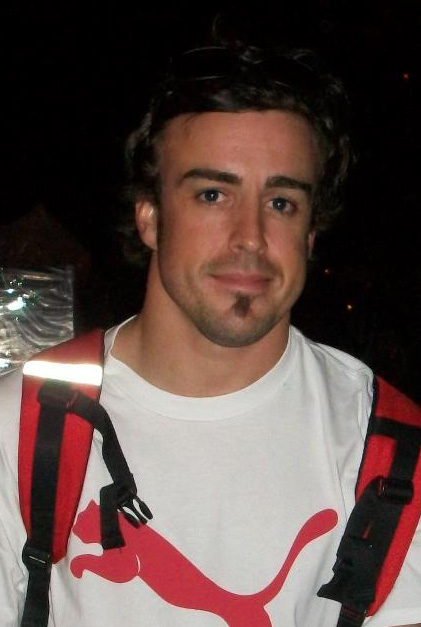
Fernando Alonso finished in second for Ferrari after leading 24 of the first 26 laps.

Pic's slower car delayed Alonso into turn one, and he made his second pit stop at the end of lap 26. Williams's strategy enabled Maldonado to pass Alonso who was six seconds behind him exiting the pit lane. At the end of lap 27, Räikkönen made his second pit stop from the lead for hard compound tyres and rejoined the track in third. On lap 28, Vettel and Massa were given drive-through penalties for ignoring yellow flags telling them to slow for turn one for Schumacher's stricken car, as was evidenced by them using DRS. Massa took his penalty immediately while Vettel served his three laps later. Vettel fell from sixth to ninth, ahead of Hülkenberg and teammate Webber. Maldonado was radioed on lap 32 to manage his rear tyres and keep his seven-second lead over Alonso in second. Alonso stayed seven seconds behind Maldonado to avoid overstressing his tyres. During lap 33, Kobayashi overtook Button on the outside entering turn five for seventh with minor contact between the two drivers. Three laps later, Hamilton made his final pit stop for a new set of hard compound tyres from fifth after pushing hard on his old set of tyres. He rejoined the circuit in heavy traffic in 14th.

Pic received a drive-through penalty for ignoring blue flags earlier in the race and delaying Alonso, but he retired in the garage on lap 37 due to driveshaft failure. Vettel used DRS on lap 38 to pass Button on the outside for seventh at the first corner. Pérez pulled off to the side of the track in the final sector of the track and became the Grand Prix's final retiree with a transmission fault on lap 40. When Alonso began drawing closer to Maldonado by half a second per lap, Williams chief strategist Mark Barnett asked the latter to stop for a new set of hard compound tyres at lap 41's conclusion. The team had difficulty installing the rear-left wheel, forcing Maldonado to remain stationary for a little longer than expected. Maldonado fell to third, behind Alonso and Räikkönen. On lap 43, Vettel suffered damage to the left side of his front wing and made a pit stop for new tyres and a front wing, falling to 10th. Maldonado drew closer to the yet-to-stop Räikkönen by a second, and was baulked by him slightly, allowing Alonso to close up for the last stint. Alonso entered the pit lane for his final tyre stop on lap 45, falling to third. Räikkönen led for two laps until Maldonado passed him with DRS for the lead into the first corner on lap 47. Alonso used DRS to overtake Räikkönen on the following lap for second.

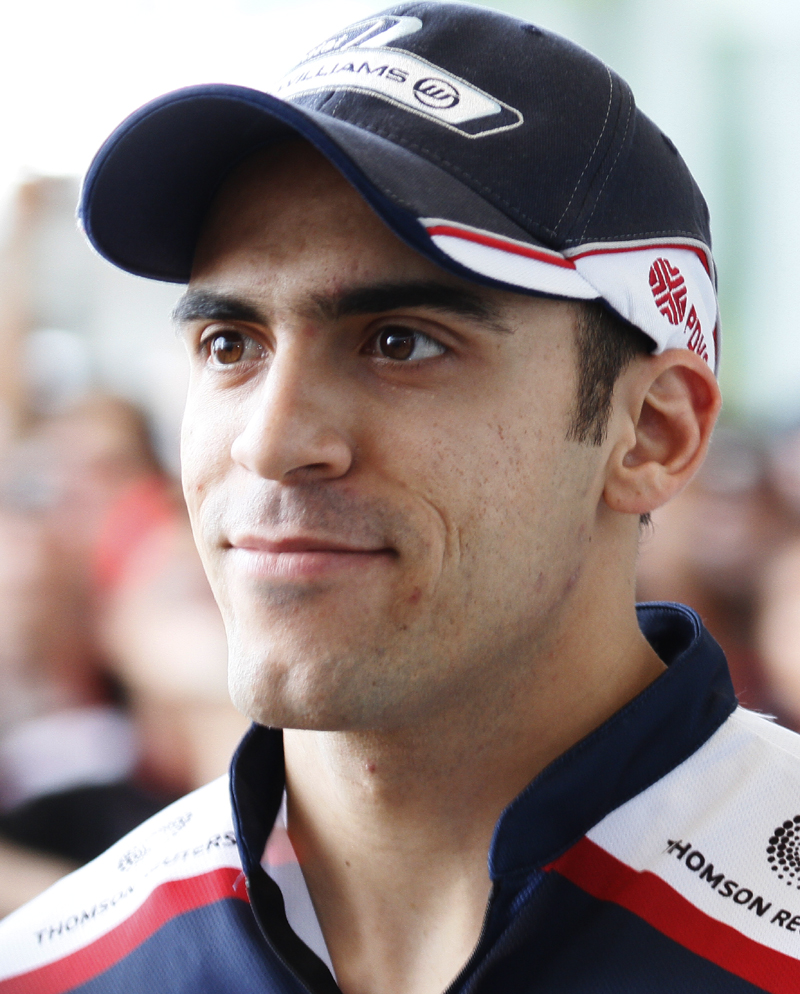
Pastor Maldonado (pictured in 2011) achieved the first and only victory for a Venezuelan driver in Formula One.

Räikkönen, third, made his final pit stop for hard compound tyres in an attempt to force Maldonado and Alonso to race past the life expectancy of their tyres, allowing him to win at the last minute. He reemerged in fourth on the 49th lap, 22 seconds behind Alonso in second. By lap 49, Alonso drew to within a second of Maldonado and could use DRS through tyre overuse after the latter was told to slow to preserve his compounds and keep the former in second. Grosjean made a pit stop from fourth on lap 52, handing third to his teammate Räikkönen. The gap between Maldonado and Alonso varied between 1.3 and 0.6 seconds over the next six laps due to the presence of slower cars as the two drivers were caught by Räikkönen, who appeared unlikely to pass them before the race ended unless their tyres degraded. On the 59th lap, Vettel braked later than Button and passed him on the inside at turn ten for eighth. The following two laps saw Kobayashi collide with Rosberg at turn five before overtaking the latter on the inside at the turn ten for fifth. Vettel held off Hamilton for seventh on the outside of turn one on lap 63, using DRS. On the 65th lap, Vettel passed Rosberg (whose lack of rear grip created wheelspin) on the inside exiting turn eight for sixth.

At the front, Maldonado extended his lead to more than three seconds after Alonso fell back due to a sudden loss of rear grip, which slowed him after mounting the kerbs exiting turn seven with nine laps remaining. He won his first Formula One race, and the first and, as of 2026, only victory for a Venezuelan driver. It was the Williams team's first victory in 130 Grand Prix starts; their previous race win was Juan Pablo Montoya's victory at the 2004 Brazilian Grand Prix, and their last one, as of 2026. Maldonado was the fifth race winner in the season's first five races. Alonso followed 3.2 seconds later in second with Räikkönen third drawing to within 0.7 seconds of Alonso. Grosjean followed in fourth, ahead of Kobayashi in fifth, Vettel sixth, Rosberg seventh, Hamilton eighth, Button ninth and Hülkenberg tenth. Webber was 11th after failing to pass Hülkenberg in the final laps. Vergne, Ricciardo, di Resta after running slower on the hard compound tyres, Massa, Kovalainen, Petrov, Glock and De la Rosa were the final classified finishers.

== Post-race ==
The top three drivers appeared on the podium to collect their trophies and spoke to the media in the subsequent press conference. Maldonado described the race as "a wonderful day" and a validation of his team's progress over the previous season: "It was a tough race because of the strategy as well, it was hard especially because of rear tyres, after a couple of laps we were struggling with them, but I need to say I am pretty happy because car was so competitive since the first lap." After finishing second, Alonso thanked the spectators and television viewers and hoped drivers would understand the importance of regulation compliance after Pic delayed him, adding: "It's more of a penalty the penalty we paid – maybe the race win – but yeah a little bit disappointed." Räikkönen expressed minor disappointment at not being competitive enough, feeling that the correct strategy would have allowed him to not fall too far behind in the final laps but still challenge for the lead, adding: "We need, like, ten more laps and then I think we could have been fighting for the win."

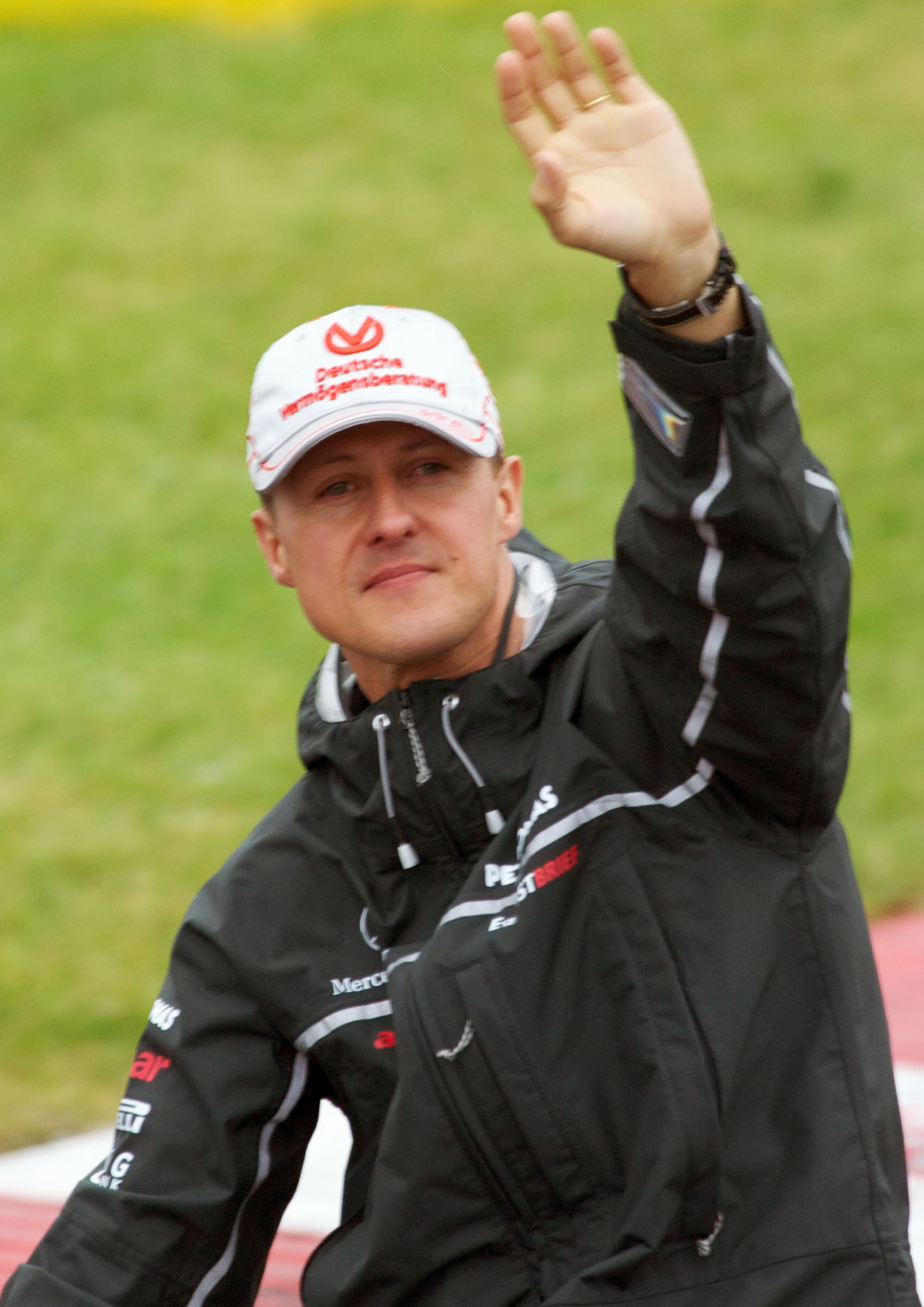
Michael Schumacher was imposed a five-place grid penalty for colliding with Bruno Senna on lap 13.

Maldonado's victory was widely celebrated in Venezuela, with photographs of him celebrating appearing in the Venezuelan press and television. He became a national hero and residents of Venezuela's capital Caracas celebrated his victory by unfurling banners reading "Maldonado, pride of Venezuela!" and blasting car horns. Hugo Chávez, Venezuela's president and a friend of Maldonado's, telephoned the driver that evening, congratulating him "in the name of Venezuela." Toto Wolff, a Williams board member, felt Maldonado's performance silenced his critics about his pay driver status and that his last lap crash at the Australian Grand Prix helped improve his mindset. Following the race, conspiracy theories emerged that the Williams team used Pirelli-supplied performance-enhancing tyres on Maldonado's car to provide team owner Frank Williams with a Grand Prix win a month after his 70th birthday. Team consultant Alexander Wurz dismissed the theory, saying in a 2020 interview with ORF that he and Williams chief designer Ed Wood were the first to understand how to heat the front tyre over the rim to swiftly resolve the issue of air flow volume cooling the wheels via the rim.

After the race, the stewards investigated Schumacher and Senna's collision on lap 13. They deemed Schumacher wholly responsible for the collision and imposed a five-place grid penalty for the following Monaco Grand Prix. Schumacher reviewed television footage of the crash before taking to the media about it. Schumacher was annoyed and said Senna turned right to defend his position before steering left under braking. Senna refuted this, saying he did not expect to hit Schumacher and turned left because he believed the latter would be on the inside upon observing the Mercedes driver's manoeuvre. Hamilton was pleased with McLaren improving his car's performance and his conserving tyres and making only two pit stops: "I was the only one to do a two stopper, despite everyone always telling me how aggressive my driving style is and how much better my team-mate is on tyres than me." Grosjean said the start was difficult because he struggled to get the front of his car to work after sustaining front wing damage on the first lap. Rosberg was bemused when his Mercedes team's tyre management issue slowed him.

The final result meant Vettel and Alonso shared the World Drivers' Championship lead with 61 championship points each. Hamilton slipped from second to third with 53 championship points, while Räikkönen's third-place finish moved him from seventh to fourth with 49 championship points. Webber's inability to score championship points dropped him from third to fifth place with 48 championship points. Red Bull maintained their World Constructors' Championship lead with 109 championship points. McLaren and Lotus maintained second and third with 98 and 84 championship points, respectively. Ferrari were fourth with 63 championship points, while Mercedes and Williams were both fifth with 43 championship points with 15 races remaining in the season.

=== Williams garage fire ===
About 90 minutes after the race, and after the celebratory photographs, the Williams garage caught fire and smoke billowed from the front and rear of the garage. Pit crews from the Williams, Force India and Caterham teams were able to bring the blaze under control. Thirty-one people were injured from burns and smoke inhalation, with seven transferred to local hospitals. All were later released. Early reports suggested that the fire was caused by fuel that exploded while being prepared for a routine post-race inspection. Photographs taken at the scene showed Senna's car as the source of the fire, which started when a fuel rig used to drain the car began leaking, while other reports suggested that a spark from the KERS unit initiated the blaze. Senna's FW34 car was damaged as a result; Maldonado's car was not in the garage at the time. Teams were reported as lending replacement equipment to Williams for the Monaco Grand Prix, and the team modified its fuel handling safety procedures. Maldonado rescued his twelve-year-old cousin Manuel from the fire, as he had a broken foot.

=== Race classification ===
Drivers who scored championship points are denoted in bold.

Pos	No.	Driver	Constructor	Laps	Time/Retired	Grid	Points
1	18	**(Venezuela) Pastor Maldonado**	**Williams-Renault**	66	1:39:09.145	1	25
2	5	**(Spain) Fernando Alonso**	**Ferrari**	66	+3.195	2	18
3	9	**(Finland) Kimi Räikkönen**	**Lotus-Renault**	66	+3.884	4	15
4	10	**(France) Romain Grosjean**	**Lotus-Renault**	66	+14.799	3	12
5	14	**(Japan) Kamui Kobayashi**	**Sauber-Ferrari**	66	+1:04.641	9	10
6	1	**(Germany) Sebastian Vettel**	**Red Bull-Renault**	66	+1:07.576	7	8
7	8	**(Germany) Nico Rosberg**	**Mercedes**	66	+1:17.919	6	6
8	4	**(United Kingdom) Lewis Hamilton**	**McLaren-Mercedes**	66	+1:18.140	24	4
9	3	**(United Kingdom) Jenson Button**	**McLaren-Mercedes**	66	+1:25.246	10	2
10	12	**(Germany) Nico Hülkenberg**	**Force India-Mercedes**	65	+1 lap	13	1
11	2	(Australia) Mark Webber	Red Bull-Renault	65	+1 lap	11	
12	17	(France) Jean-Éric Vergne	Toro Rosso-Ferrari	65	+1 lap	14	
13	16	(Australia) Daniel Ricciardo	Toro Rosso-Ferrari	65	+1 lap	15	
14	11	(United Kingdom) Paul di Resta	Force India-Mercedes	65	+1 lap	12	
15	6	(Brazil) Felipe Massa	Ferrari	65	+1 lap	16	
16	20	(Finland) Heikki Kovalainen	Caterham-Renault	65	+1 lap	19	
17	21	(Russia) Vitaly Petrov	Caterham-Renault	65	+1 lap	18	
18	24	(Germany) Timo Glock	Marussia-Cosworth	64	+2 laps	21	
19	22	(Spain) Pedro de la Rosa	HRT-Cosworth	63	+3 laps	22	
Ret	15	(Mexico) Sergio Pérez	Sauber-Ferrari	37	Transmission	5	
Ret	25	(France) Charles Pic	Marussia-Cosworth	35	Halfshaft	20	
Ret	23	(India) Narain Karthikeyan	HRT-Cosworth	22	Wheel	23	
Ret	19	(Brazil) Bruno Senna	Williams-Renault	12	Collision damage	17	
Ret	7	(Germany) Michael Schumacher	Mercedes	12	Collision	8	

== Championship standings after the race ==
Drivers' Championship standings

+/–	Pos.	Driver	Points
	1	(Germany) Sebastian Vettel	61
3	2	(Spain) Fernando Alonso	61
1	3	(United Kingdom) Lewis Hamilton	53
3	4	(Finland) Kimi Räikkönen	49
2	5	(Australia) Mark Webber	48

Constructors' Championship standings

+/–	Pos.	Constructor	Points
	1	(Austria) Red Bull-Renault	109
	2	(United Kingdom) McLaren-Mercedes	98
	3	(United Kingdom) Lotus-Renault	84
	4	(Italy) Ferrari	63
	5	(Germany) Mercedes	43
Sources:

- Note: Only the top five positions are included for both sets of standings.

== See also ==
- 2012 Catalunya GP2 Series round
- 2012 Catalunya GP3 Series round

== Footnotes ==
Previous race: 2012 Bahrain Grand Prix	FIA Formula One World Championship; 2012 season	Next race: 2012 Monaco Grand Prix
Previous race: 2011 Spanish Grand Prix	Spanish Grand Prix	Next race: 2013 Spanish Grand Prix
