= Formula One drivers from India =

List of Formula One drivers who competed as Indian

- Drivers: 2
- Grands Prix: 59
- Entries: 59
- Starts: 57
- Best season finish: 18th (2005)
- Wins: 0
- Podiums: 0
- Pole positions: 0
- Fastest laps: 0
- Points: 5
- First entry: 2005 Australian Grand Prix
- Latest entry: 2012 Brazilian Grand Prix
- 2026 drivers: None

As of 2026, there have been two Formula One drivers from India. Indian Formula One drivers have had a race entry to 59 Grands Prix. Across these Grands Prix, Indian Formula One drivers have accumulated 5 points between them. No Indian driver has taken a race win, podium, fastest lap or pole position.

Narain Karthikeyan made his debut in 2005 driving for Jordan. He would score 5 points at that year's United States Grand Prix. Karthikeyan would go on to race for HRT for two years from 2011; his Formula One career ended when HRT folded at the end of 2012. India's second driver, Karun Chandhok, made his debut in 2010 for HRT and would go on to drive for Lotus in 2011.

== Former drivers ==
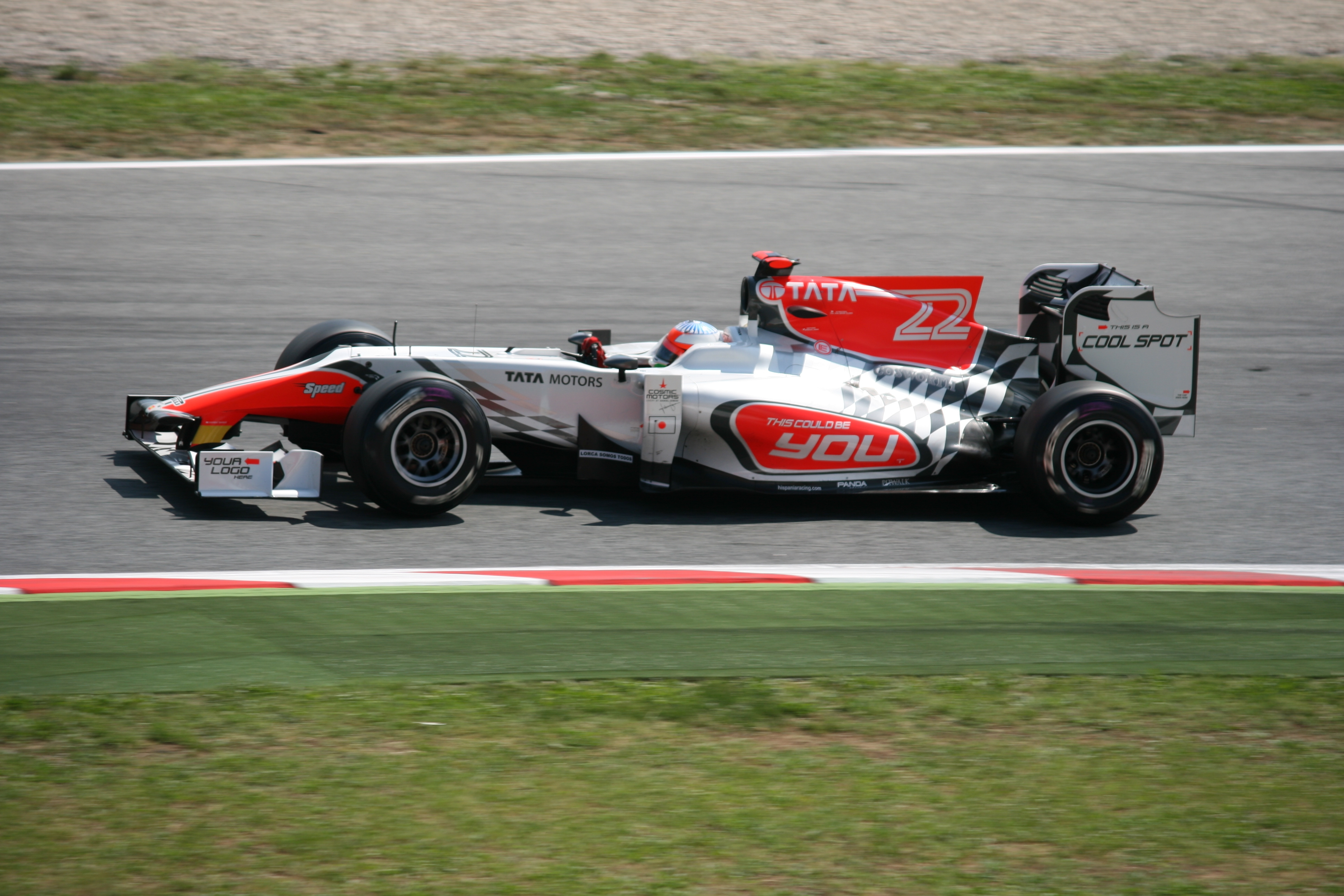
Karthikeyan driving for HRT at the 2011 Spanish Grand Prix

India's first Formula One driver was Narain Karthikeyan. Karthikeyan made his debut in 2005 driving for Jordan. He ended the season with 5 points, having come 4th at the United States Grand Prix. Besides this, Karthikeyan's best result was eleventh. Karthikeyan was dropped after Jordan was sold to Midland. He was given the role as 4th driver for the Williams team for the 2006 season, and was promoted to third driver after Mark Webber left the team in 2007. Karthikeyan took a race seat with HRT for the 2011 season. He was replaced after 7 rounds by Daniel Ricciardo. He later made a one-off return at the 2011 Indian Grand Prix, replacing Vitantonio Liuzzi. He drove for HRT again in the 2012 season, this time partnering with Pedro de la Rosa. Kartikeyan struggled against his teammate, failing to beat him throughout the season's races. He lost his race seat after HRT folded at the end of the year.

India's second Formula One driver was Karun Chandhok. Chandhok was signed by HRT for the 2010 season. He would participate in 10 of the 19 rounds before Sakon Yamamoto took his car. Chandhok was then signed to Lotus as a test driver for 2011 and participated in the 2011 German Grand Prix where he replaced Jarno Trulli. Chandhok left Formula One at the end of 2011.

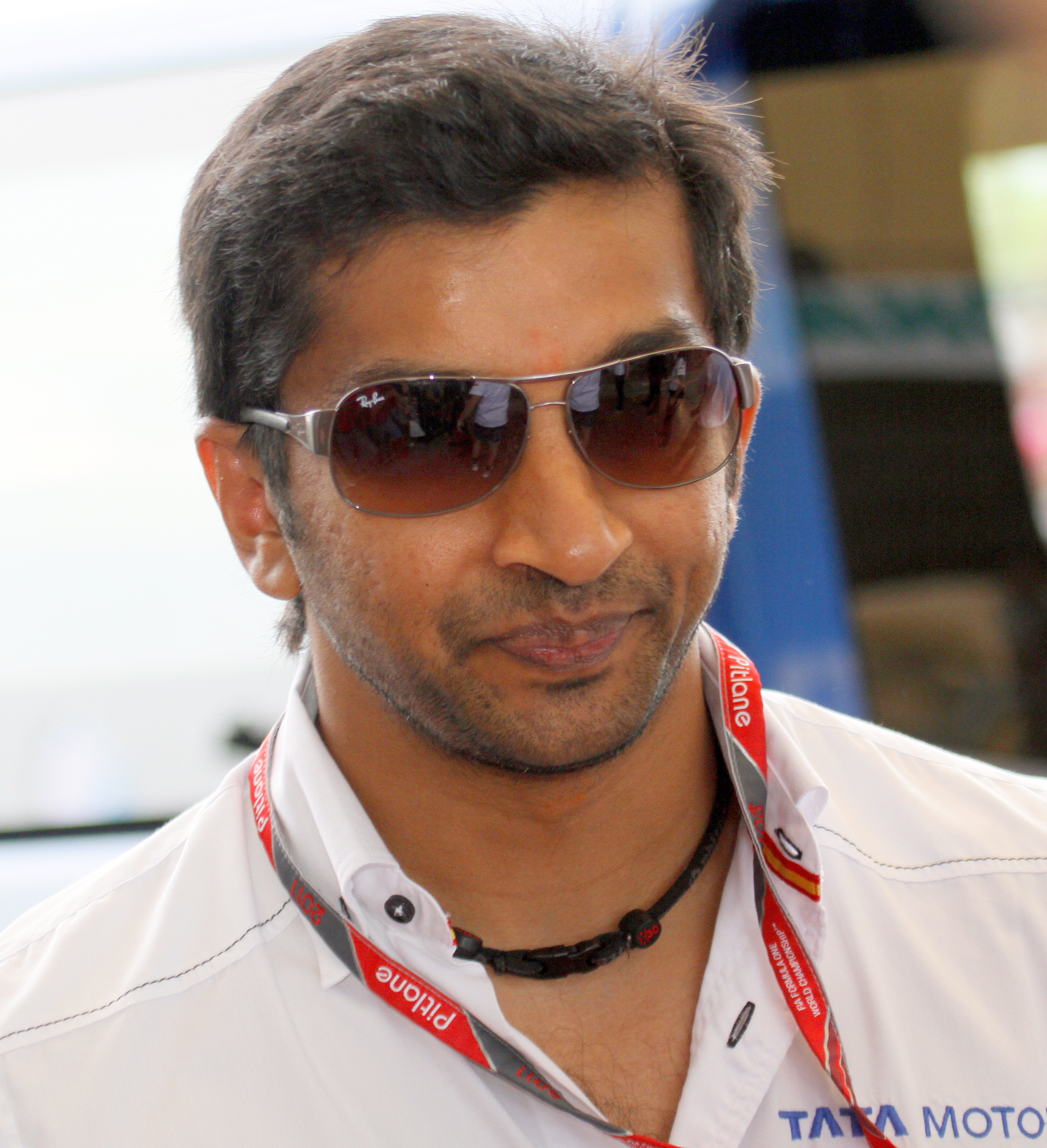
Narain Karthikeyan

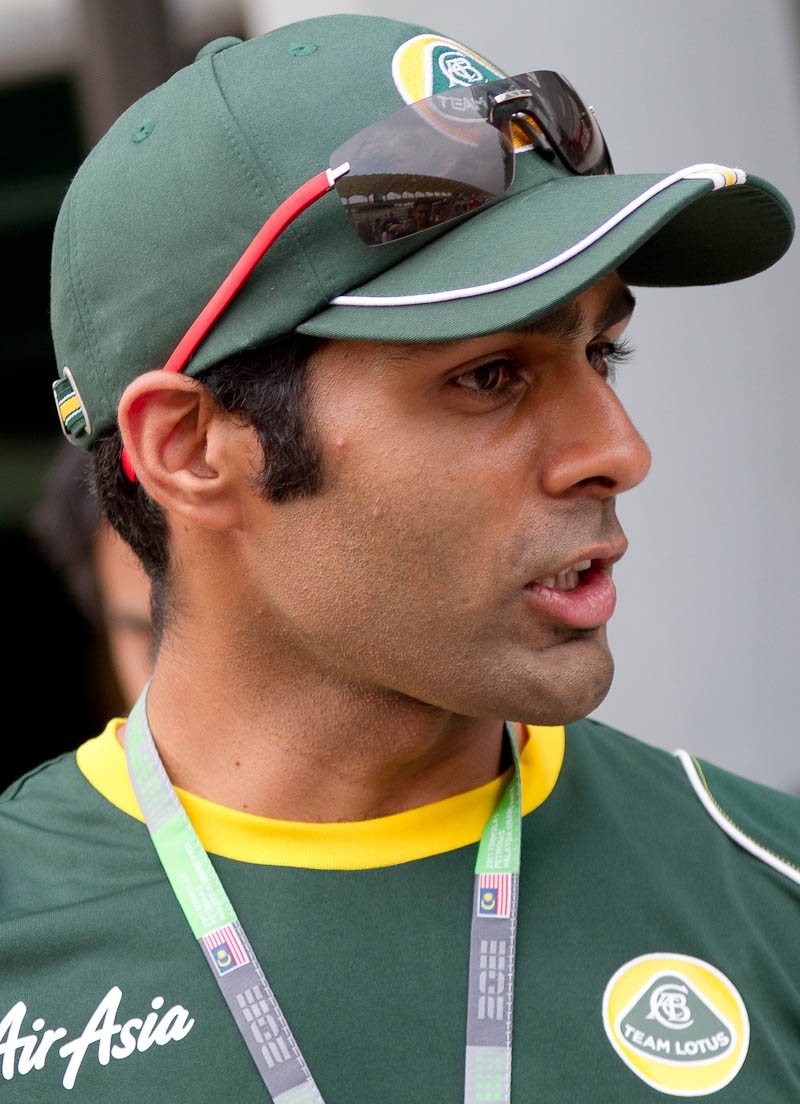
Karun Chandhok

== Statistics ==
| Drivers | Active Years | Entries | Wins | Podiums | Career Points | Poles | Fastest Laps |
|---|---|---|---|---|---|---|---|
| Narain Karthikeyan | 2005, 2011–2012 | 48 (46 starts) | 0 | 0 | 5 | 0 | 0 |
| Karun Chandhok | 2010–2011 | 11 | 0 | 0 | 0 | 0 | 0 |

== See also ==
- List of Formula One drivers
