= Dougie McCracken =

Scottish footballer (1964–2011)

Personal information
- Date of birth: 21 July 1964
- Place of birth: Kilwinning, Scotland
- Date of death: 5 May 2011 (aged 46)
- Place of death: Lanark, Scotland
- Positions: Defender; forward

Senior career*
Years	Team	Apps	(Gls)
- Ardrossan Winton Rovers
1985–1990	Ayr United	93	(17)
1990–1991	Dumbarton	19	(0)
1991–1993	East Fife	28	(1)
- Largs Thistle
Total		140	(18)
- * Club domestic league appearances and goals

Dougie McCracken (21 July 1964 – 5 May 2011) was a Scottish professional footballer who played as both a defender and a forward.

== Career ==
Born in Kilwinning, McCracken made 140 appearances in the Scottish Football League for Ayr United, Dumbarton and East Fife.

== Later life and death ==
McCracken was found dead in his house on 5 May 2011. He was the step-father of F1 driver Paul di Resta.
