= 2012 Monaco Grand Prix =

Coordinates: 43°44′4.74″N 7°25′16.8″E

Race 6 of 20 in the 2012 Formula One World Championship
← Previous race	Next race →
- Circuit de Monaco

Race details
- Date: 27 May 2012
- Official name: Formula 1 Grand Prix de Monaco 2012
- Location: Circuit de Monaco
- Course: Street circuit
- Course length: 3.34 km (2.08 miles)
- Distance: 78 laps, 260.52 km (162.24 miles)
- Weather: Fine and Dry, showers threatening at end Air Temp 21 °C (70 °F) Track Temp 38 °C (100 °F) dropping to 31 °C (88 °F)

Pole position
Driver	(Australia) Mark Webber (Note: Michael Schumacher set the fastest time in qualifying, but he was required to start the race from sixth after receiving a five-place grid penalty for a collision with Bruno Senna in the previous race.)	Red Bull-Renault
- Time: 1:14.381

Fastest lap
Driver	(Mexico) Sergio Pérez	Sauber-Ferrari
- Time: 1:17.296 on lap 49

Podium
First	(Australia) Mark Webber	Red Bull-Renault
Second	(Germany) Nico Rosberg	Mercedes
Third	(Spain) Fernando Alonso	Ferrari

The 2012 Monaco Grand Prix (formally the Formula 1 Grand Prix de Monaco 2012) was a Formula One motor race that took place in the principality of Monaco on 27 May 2012. It was the sixth round of the 2012 season, and the seventieth running of the Monaco Grand Prix. The race was supported by the GP2, GP3 and Formula Renault 3.5 series.

Mark Webber won the race after taking pole position; his victory created a new record for Formula One in that there had never been six different winners of the opening six Grands Prix of the season before. Mercedes' Nico Rosberg came in second place, his second podium in the 2012 season, while Ferrari's Fernando Alonso rounded out the podium in third.

== Report ==
=== Background ===
Like the 2011 Monaco Grand Prix, tyre supplier Pirelli brought its yellow-banded soft compound tyre as the harder "prime" tyre and the red-banded super-soft compound tyre as the softer "option" tyre. It was the first time for the season that the super-soft compound made an appearance at a race weekend.

==== Circuit changes ====
The circuit underwent some extensive changes in the aftermath of Sergio Pérez's accident during qualifying for the 2011 Monaco Grand Prix. Pérez crashed heavily at the Nouvelle Chicane, suffering a concussion and a sprained thigh. He was unable to take part in the race. In response to this, the event organisers had the approach to the chicane smoothened by lowering the tarmac 20 centimetres (7.9 in), and the barrier that Pérez hit was moved back a further 15 metres (49 ft). Other changes included the widening of the pit exit and the removal of nearby trees to allow a driver re-joining the race greater visibility. TecPro barriers were also added at Sainte Dévote and Piscine.

==== Driver penalties ====
Michael Schumacher was given a five-place grid penalty for causing an avoidable collision with Bruno Senna during the Spanish Grand Prix. Pastor Maldonado was given a ten-place grid penalty for causing an avoidable collision with Sergio Pérez during the final free practice session. He then received another five-place grid penalty for a gearbox change.

=== Qualifying ===
Qualifying took place at 14:00 local time under fine and sunny conditions with an ambient temperature of 23 °C (73 °F) and a track temperature of 39 °C (102 °F).

==== Q1 ====
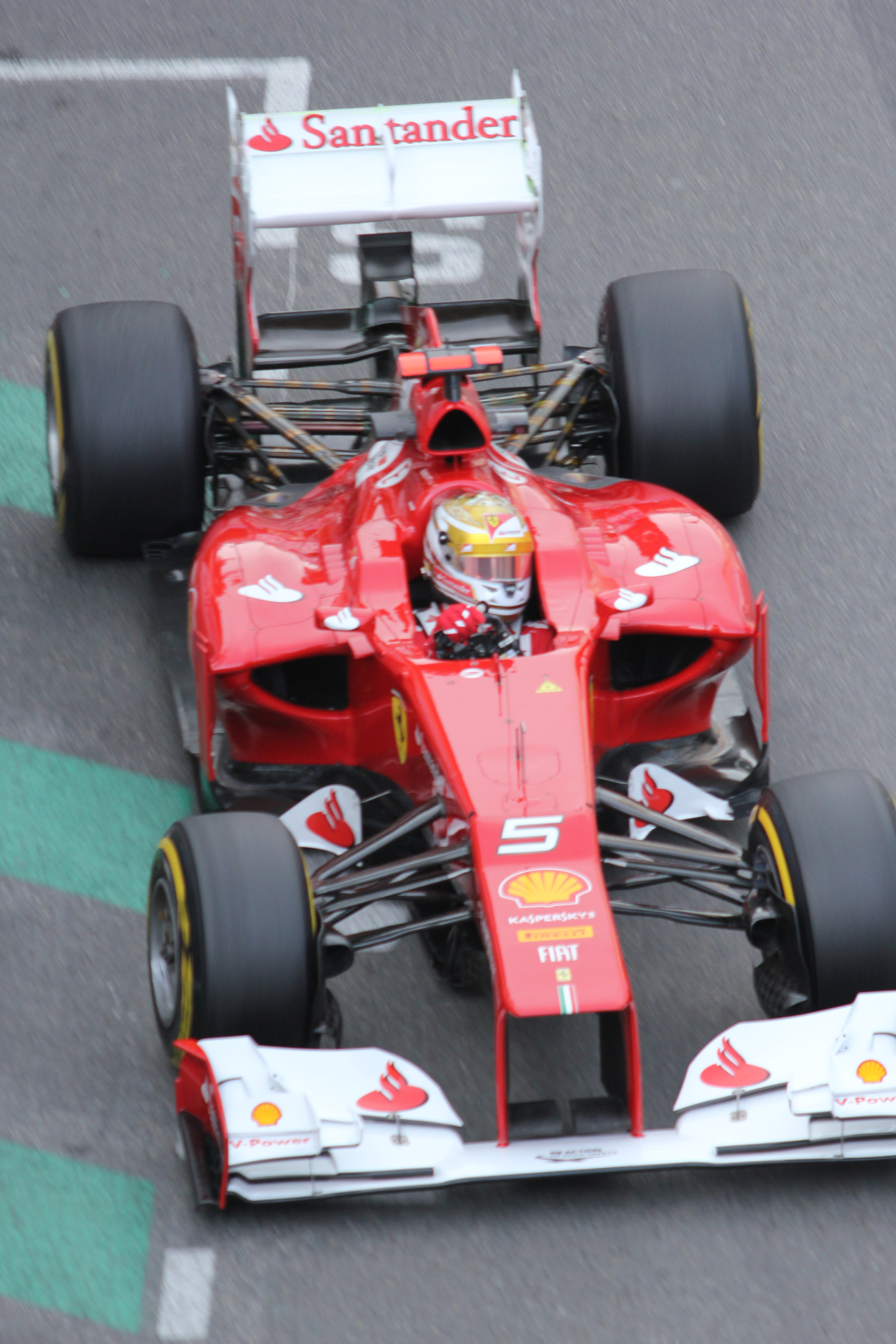
Fernando Alonso (pictured in free practice) sported a special livery helmet during the race weekend.

Charles Pic and Jean-Éric Vergne were the first cars to emerge from pit lane once the twenty-minute session was given the green light to begin. Pic's first flying lap was ruined when he was blocked by the slow-moving HRT of Pedro de la Rosa at Rascasse, forcing the Frenchman to pit.

Sauber's Sergio Pérez crashed heavily at the Swimming Pool, striking the outer barrier with enough force to remove a wheel. The session was red-flagged due to his crash (for the second year in succession) for six minutes while the car was removed. During replays of the incident, commentators observed Pérez shouting "power steering!" over his radio moments before the crash. Pérez's left-front steering was damaged, leading to speculation that the crash had been a by-product of the incident with Pastor Maldonado in the third free practice session.

With eight minutes remaining Mercedes driver Michael Schumacher led teammate Nico Rosberg with several drivers close behind. Defending World Champion Sebastian Vettel opted for a set of super-soft tyres late in the session, as his time from his stint on the slower soft tyres had left him in 16th place. Both Lotus drivers waited late to set their first timed lap, both opting for soft tyres. However, while Romain Grosjean set a competitive lap time, Kimi Räikkönen was not so quick and was only half a second ahead Caterham's Heikki Kovalainen and in danger of being eliminated. Räikkönen switched to a set of super-soft compounds and was able to avoid elimination.

Nico Hülkenberg set the fastest time of the session while on super-softs, while at the back of the field, Kovalainen out-qualified teammate Vitaly Petrov by eight-tenths of a second, with Marussia's Timo Glock a further half-second behind. Pedro de la Rosa was also eliminated ahead of Pic and teammate Narain Karthikeyan. As he did not set a lap time, Sergio Pérez was twenty-fourth and last, though this became twenty-third when Maldonado's grid penalties were applied. Prior to the session, Pérez had been the only driver on the grid who had not been eliminated in Q1 since the introduction of the knockout qualifying system.

==== Q2 ====
Force India driver Paul di Resta was first out followed by Williams's Bruno Senna for the fifteen-minute session. All cars were out on track early, however Jean-Éric Vergne damaged his front wing and suspension after he hit the wall under braking on the exit of the tunnel. Vergne limped back to the pits where he was subsequently eliminated.

After the early phases of timed laps, Rosberg was fastest on 1:15.022. Six minutes of the Q2 session remained when Vettel pitted with complaints about the front of his car "jumping like a rabbit". After opting for soft tyres early on, both Lotus cars eventually went for super-soft tyres along with the rest of the field. Late in the session, the first driver into the 1:14 bracket was Felipe Massa in his Ferrari.

As time ran out, McLaren driver Jenson Button, was 11th and in the elimination zone, along with the Lotuses, Toro Rossos, Di Resta and Senna. Grosjean and Räikkönen were able to set laps good enough to push German Nico Hülkenberg and the sole remaining Sauber of Kamui Kobayashi out of qualifying and into 11th and 12th places, respectively. Button was unable to improve on his previous lap and missed entry to the Q3 session by two-tenths of a second. It was the first time since the 2008 Brazilian Grand Prix that Button had missed Q3 in consecutive race weekends. Behind Button were Senna, di Resta and Daniel Ricciardo.

At the end of the period, just 0.967 of a second separated the top sixteen drivers.

==== Q3 ====
The Mercedes of Nico Rosberg was the first car on track followed by Pastor Maldonado. The ten-minute session was split into two informal phases: initial competitive timed laps followed by short rest at the pits, then a frantic run at the end of the session. In the first five minutes, Vettel and the two Ferrari drivers were the only drivers not to set timed laps.

Rosberg and Lewis Hamilton both went out on a brand new set of super-soft tyres, while others fitted used tyres of the same compound. After the initial runs, Rosberg (who completed two timed laps) led the Lotus of Grosjean, followed by Mark Webber. The gap between the top three was just over one tenth of a second, meaning that no driver had the comfort of knowing his lap time would be sufficient to hold his current position.

With three minutes left of the session, the top five cars at the time pitted and awaited for their final attack on qualifying. At this stage, both Ferraris went out onto the track for the first time in the session, along with Vettel. However, Vettel left the pit with the slower soft tyres fitted. It became clear by his slow pace that he would – as in Spain – not complete a timed lap so as to have the option of starting the race on either type of dry compound tyres.

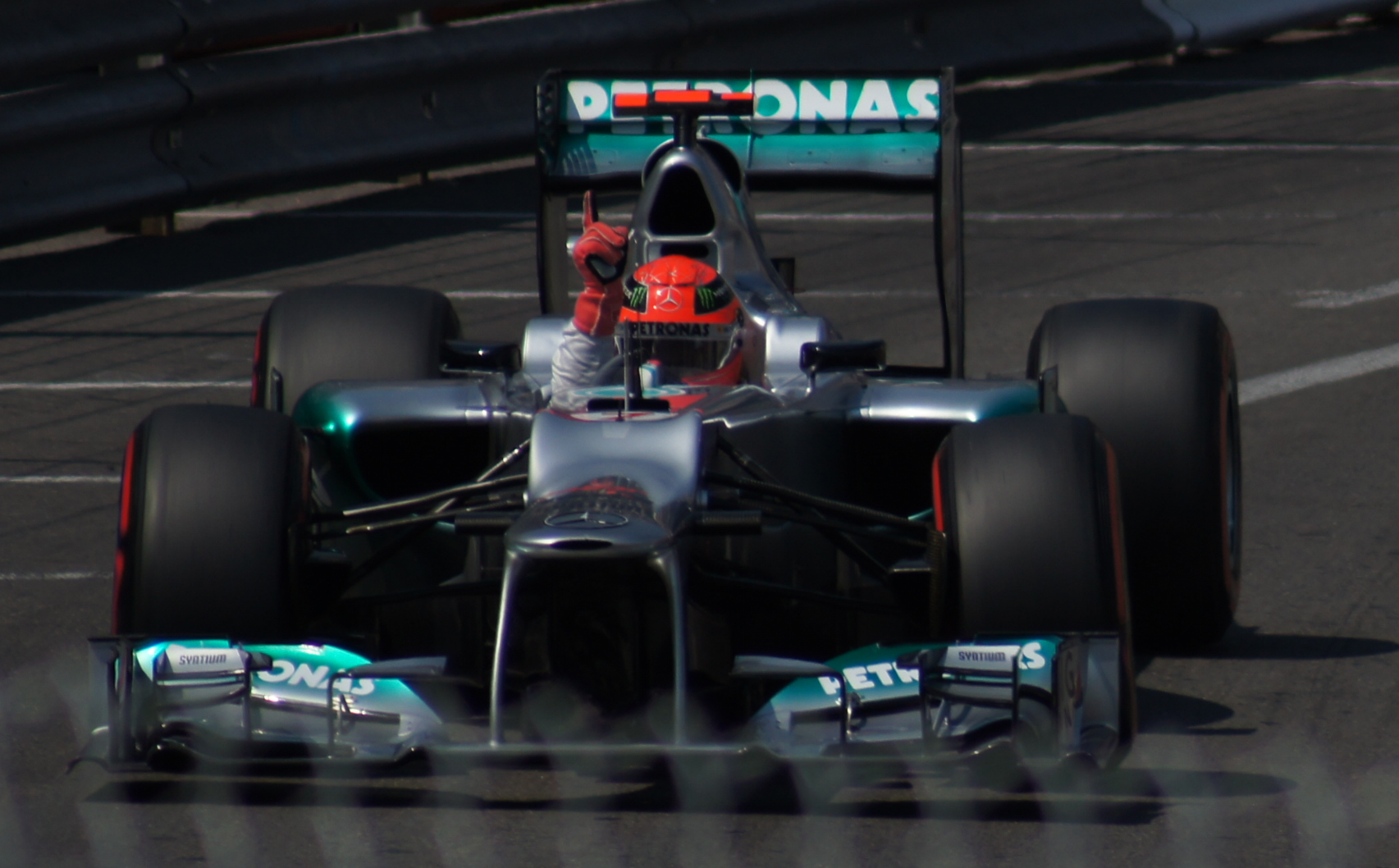
Michael Schumacher celebrates setting the fastest time in qualifying, but he would drop 5 grid spaces due to his collision in Spain. He later retired from the race.

Webber, Grosjean and Rosberg all went out again on an unused set of the red-banded super-soft compound, but their initial times remained unchallenged. All cars were by then on the track, with the exception of Vettel. As the chequered flag fell upon the session, it was Webber who was ahead of Rosberg, after having set the fastest second and third sector times. Hamilton and Massa fell short of Webber's time, leaving Schumacher, Rosberg and Grosjean the only drivers capable of taking pole from Webber, as they were the only drivers to still on a timed lap.

Schumacher was the only one to eclipse Webber's time and did so by only eight hundredths of a second. It was the first time he had been fastest in qualification since his comeback after he left the sport in 2006. Unfortunately for him, he would have to start from sixth on the grid due to his penalty from the previous race. This elevated Red Bull driver Webber to pole position, the tenth of his career. The second Mercedes of Rosberg was third, with Hamilton in fourth and Grosjean in fifth, although all, along with Fernando Alonso, would also gain a place due to Schumacher's penalty. Alonso was six-tenths of a second off the pole time, leading Massa, who qualified in the top ten for the first time in 2012. Kimi Räikkönen was eighth fastest, followed by Maldonado, whose ten-place grid penalty and subsequent penalty for a gearbox change would drop him from ninth to last on the grid. Vettel was promoted to ninth, and would start alongside the Force India of Nico Hülkenberg.

==== Post qualifying ====
Schumacher was extremely happy with his best qualifying performance since his return to Formula One racing. The seven time world champion stated "It is simply a wonderful feeling to set pole after such a long time, and particularly here in Monaco. Okay, it has taken a little bit longer than I might have wanted in the second chapter of my career, but that makes it even sweeter. It's just beautiful". Schumacher came into qualifying knowing that his five-place grid penalty would mean that his best possible grid position was sixth. Knowing this, in the Wednesday pre-race press conference Schumacher rather humorously stated he would have to qualify in first position. True to his word Schumacher later stated in the post-qualifying press conference "I told you guys already in the press conference, my situation is going to be pole, start the race in sixth and I'm going to win it".

Struggling Ferrari driver Felipe Massa was upbeat about his best qualifying performance of the 2012 season saying "I am very happy with how things have gone in this Grand Prix so far. Finally, I am having fun at the wheel of the F2012".

Adding to Maldonado's ten-place grid penalty for colliding with Mexican Sergio Pérez in free practice three (FP3), the Williams team decided to make a gearbox change and incur a further five-place grid penalty. Pérez, who failed to set a qualifying time, also decided to take a gearbox change and was penalised with a five-place grid penalty. Maldonado started in 24th with the Mexican ahead of him in 23rd.

=== Race ===
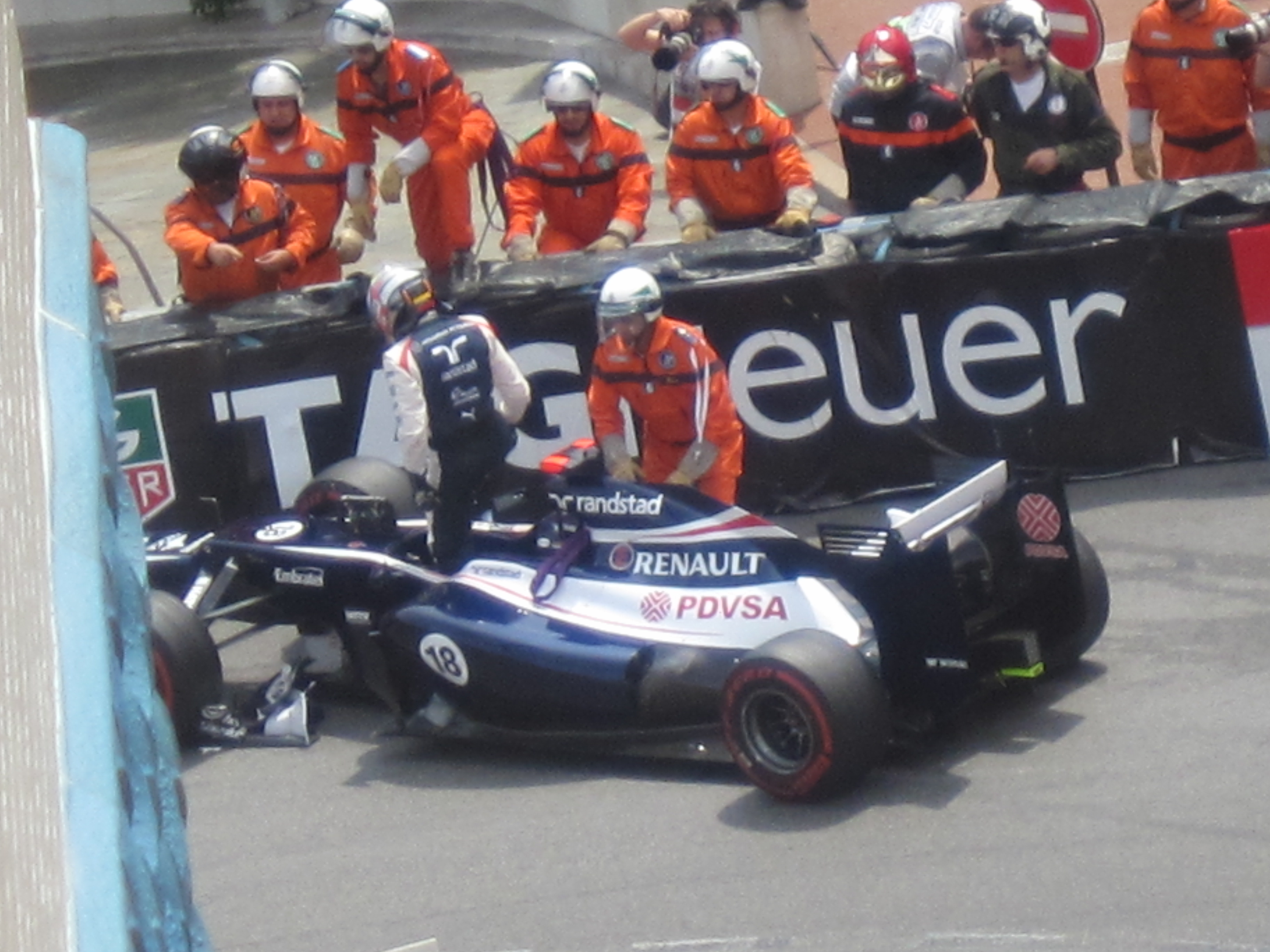
Pastor Maldonado was one driver who had to retire following the accident in the first corner.

The Monaco Grand Prix was the sixth of the season and began at 12:00 UTC (14:00 local). Conditions for the race were sunny with an ambient temperature of 22 °C (72 °F) and a track temperature of 35 °C (95 °F). Rain was forecast for the day but it was unclear whether the race would be affected. The race begun with humidity at 58%. Sebastian Vettel, Jenson Button, Paul di Resta, Vitaly Petrov and Pedro de la Rosa were the only drivers to start on the slower yellow-banded soft compound tyre, with the rest of the field either opting or being forced (by qualifying rules) to start on the red-banded super-soft compound.

As the race started both Mark Webber and Nico Rosberg got away cleanly and were first and second, respectively, as the field squabbled behind them. Fernando Alonso squeezed through the gap between Grosjean and McLaren's Lewis Hamilton, but Grosjean clipped the rear left wheel of the Ferrari which in turn pushed him to the outside of the track and into the path of fast starting Michael Schumacher. Schumacher had nowhere to go as he was already right next to the wall and as a result Grosjean's left rear wheel was forced into and over the Mercedes car's front right, which severely damaged the Lotus's suspension. This sent Grosjean into a spin and he ended up broadside across the track at the entry to turn one. Other drivers tried to avoid crashing into each other and the stricken Grosjean, however some failed. Vettel, starting from ninth, clipped the front wing of the still moving Lotus but his car was undamaged. He and a number of others took the shortcut behind the apex of the first corner to avoid the mess. Sauber's Kamui Kobayashi, who was right behind Vettel, decided to avoid Grosjean by passing him on the racing line. Before the Lotus finally came to a complete stop it rolled backwards slightly and its right rear tyre clipped the left rear of slow moving Kobayashi sending him into the air, nearly landing on Button's McLaren. At the very back of the field, amidst all the chaos Pastor Maldonado, starting last, braked too late and crashed into the back of de la Rosa's HRT, terminally damaging both his front wing and de la Rosa's rear wing. Maldonado retired later in the lap. In order to permit safe clearance of the debris, the safety car was deployed.

The safety car was called in during the second lap after Grosjean and Maldonado's cars had been removed, while Kobayashi and de la Rosa made it back to the pits under their own power. Damage to de la Rosa's car forced his retirement, but following checks the Sauber was able to rejoin the race in 21st place. Schumacher was told by his team that his car seemed fine after the contact with Grosjean and he was able to continue.

On the restart nearly all drivers held their positions. Webber led Rosberg and Hamilton in an unchanged top three from the grid. Meanwhile, Kobayashi returned to the pits where he retired due to suspension damaged from the first corner incident with the Lotus. Webber was setting consecutive fastest laps while the stewards investigated various cars cutting the first corner to avoid Grosjean; no further action was taken.

After 13 laps the threat of rain forced teams to not pit stop early so as not to change tyres again if it did eventually rain. Petrov pitted on lap 16 only to retire as he had an electrical problem. As the track temperature dropped both Ferraris, in fourth and fifth, started to pick up pace and set quick lap times.

By lap 23 the sole remaining Sauber of Sergio Pérez was the only car making multiple overtaking moves, up to 15th from his 23rd place grid spot. Meanwhile, Schumacher pressured a struggling Kimi Räikkönen as the Lotus driver was told to stay out and wait for predicted rain. Thanks to Räikkönen's pace, a gap formed that allowed Rosberg to pit on lap 27, to switch to the soft compound tyre, and return to the track without any nearby traffic.

Leaders Webber and Hamilton followed Rosberg's lead and pitted the next lap. Alonso, now in first place, stayed out for another lap during which he set consecutive fastest sectors by nearly a second before following the others and switching to the soft tyre. So quick was Alonso that he came out of the pits well ahead of Hamilton. Massa inherited the lead and pitted on the next lap. This left Vettel, who had not stopped, in the lead with a ten-second advantage over his teammate, Webber. As the race went on Vettel extended his lead over Webber and the rest of the field. Later, in the press conference, both Webber and Rosberg stated that they had struggled to warm their soft compound tyre at that time of the race whereas Vettel already had the tyres at the optimum temperature.

On lap 38 Pérez was given a drive-through penalty for a late pit entry that had impeded Räikkönen. The same lap also saw Button, who started on the soft tyre, change for the super-soft compound. In an already poor race for Button, his pit stop allowed the Caterham of Heikki Kovalainen to slip ahead of him as he rejoined.

The gap to Vettel had settled to sixteen seconds as he still waited for the forecast rain. Massa got a radio message asking him to close the gap to Hamilton as there was a possibility that Vettel could split the two when he rejoined. Further back there was a significant gap from sixth to seventh, where Schumacher was being followed by Jean-Éric Vergne, who had pitted early, and the two Force Indias. Kovalainen held twelfth place ahead of both Button and Toro Rosso driver Daniel Ricciardo.

Forty-five laps into the race Vettel finally took his only pit stop for the race. As he rejoined, teammate Webber reclaimed the lead while Vettel was able to only marginally get ahead of Hamilton. As the leaders lapped backmarkers, the gap between the top six was less than six seconds. Räikkönen's engineer told him that no rain was now expected.

By lap 48 Pérez was 2.7 seconds per lap quicker than the leaders and set a number of fastest laps. Ferrari engineer Rob Smedley was attempting to keep Massa motivated in sixth when he claimed "keep our tyres fresh cause he doesn't look absolutely fantastic, old Lewis", referring to Hamilton ahead in fifth.

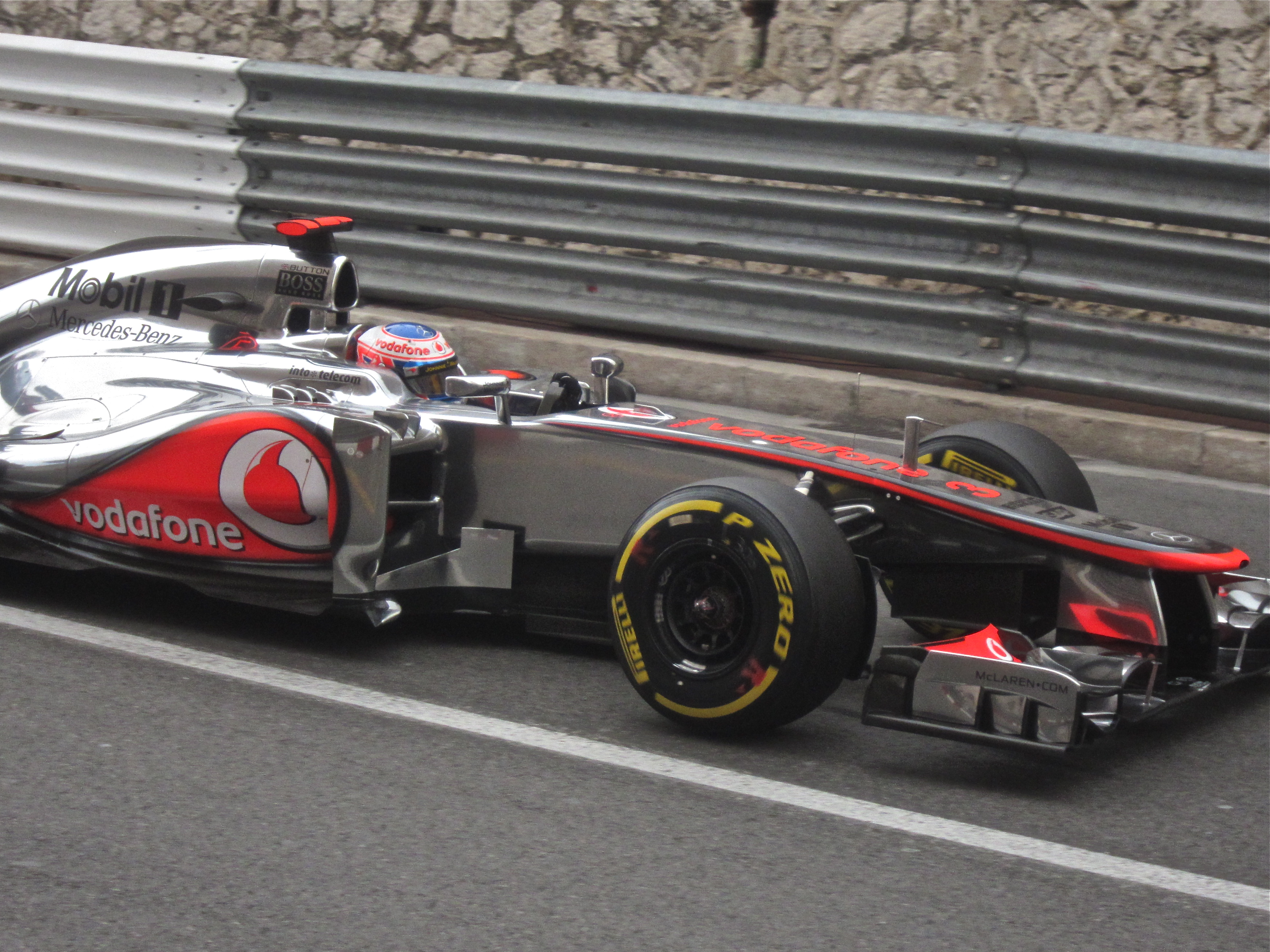
Jenson Button retired from the race on lap 70.

Schumacher began to complain of a problem on lap 59 but still continued. However, on lap 61 he let Vergne past him and continued to slow. Spots of rain started to show in some parts of the track but nothing of real concern for the drivers. A few laps later the seven time world champion entered the pits and retired from the race with a fuel pressure problem. In consecutive laps Pic and Ricciardo both retired from the race owing to an electrical fault and a steering problem, respectively.

With 10 laps remaining, the first six drivers were split by fewer than four seconds. On lap 69 and Vergne pitted to switch to intermediate tyres; the only driver to do so in the race. Still behind Kovalainen, Button locked up his brakes next to the swimming pool and spun. That left Pérez behind him to attack the Caterham, which Pérez succeeded in passing. Vergne's move to intermediate tyres had not worked, as he was losing over seven seconds every lap to his rivals. Two laps after Button spun, he had caught back up to Kovalainen. Button attempted an overtake on Kovalainen around the outside of turn 1. Button, who was able to brake later in his McLaren, launched down the outside of Kovalainen in the braking zone of turn 1. At the same time Kovalainen moved left and the Finn's front wing hit Button's front right tyre, causing a puncture on the McLaren, and Kovalainen damaged his front wing. A subsequent pit stop for Kovalainen put him down to 13th place, meanwhile Button retired from the race due to his puncture.

The gap at the front remained close however; no driver was able to move ahead. In the final few laps rain still threatened, but each of the six leaders held their own as they lapped cars. Hamilton and Massa did drop back slightly from the four towards the end of the race. By the final lap, artificial light from cameras was becoming more prominent as daylight faded with the threat of darker rain clouds. Ultimately, Webber was able to keep Rosberg, Alonso and Vettel at bay for his second career victory at the Monte-Carlo circuit.

In winning the Monaco Grand Prix Webber became the only Australian to win on multiple occasions at the circuit. It was Webber's first win of the season and first since his victory at the last race of the 2011 season in Brazil. In taking the victory Webber and the five victorious drivers before him set a new record for six different winners from the first six races of a Formula One season. The margin between the first four drivers was only 1.343 seconds as Rosberg followed Webber into second place and Spaniard Alonso finished in third; his 76th career podium. Red Bull teammate Vettel, using a different strategy to the top three, was fourth while Hamilton was fifth. Massa backed up his best qualifying effort of the season with his best result of the season by finishing sixth and only six seconds from the eventual winner.

Some forty seconds off the lead was the Force India's led by di Resta, who was on the same strategy as Vettel, and teammate Hülkenberg who (like Webber and Massa) captured his best result of the season thus far. Räikkönen was ninth while Williams driver Senna picked up the final point in tenth. Importantly for the constructors title, Caterham driver Kovalainen finished in thirteenth (his highest so far) moving Caterham up into tenth place ahead of Marussia and HRT on the 2012 standings. This was despite Marussia driver Glock (14th) and HRT driver Karthikeyan (15th) finishing in their respective highest positions for the season.

Alonso's second podium in 2012 enabled him to take the Formula One championship lead by three points over Vettel and Webber. Meanwhile, Hamilton dropped down to fourth, thirteen points behind Alonso, while Rosberg moved to fifth in the standings with 59 points. The top two in the Constructors' Championship remained unchanged, with Red Bull extending their lead to 38 points over McLaren, as the latter scored ten points following Button's retirement. Ferrari overtook Lotus for third in the standings despite being tied on points with 86. (Note: Ferrari was classified ahead of Lotus by virtue of the countback system, as Ferrari scored more wins up to that point with one compared to Lotus' zero, meaning that Ferrari was placed higher in the standings.)

== Classification ==
=== Qualifying ===
Pos.	No.	Driver	Constructor	Part 1	Part 2	Part 3	Grid
1	7	(Germany) Michael Schumacher	Mercedes	1:15.873	1:15.062	1:14.301	6^{1}
2	2	(Australia) Mark Webber	Red Bull-Renault	1:16.013	1:15.035	1:14.381	1
3	8	(Germany) Nico Rosberg	Mercedes	1:15.900	1:15.022	1:14.448	2
4	4	(United Kingdom) Lewis Hamilton	McLaren-Mercedes	1:16.063	1:15.166	1:14.583	3
5	10	(France) Romain Grosjean	Lotus-Renault	1:15.718	1:15.219	1:14.639	4
6	5	(Spain) Fernando Alonso	Ferrari	1:16.153	1:15.128	1:14.948	5
7	6	(Brazil) Felipe Massa	Ferrari	1:15.983	1:14.911	1:15.049	7
8	9	(Finland) Kimi Räikkönen	Lotus-Renault	1:15.889	1:15.322	1:15.199	8
9	18	(Venezuela) Pastor Maldonado	Williams-Renault	1:16.017	1:15.026	1:15.245	23^{2}
10	1	(Germany) Sebastian Vettel	Red Bull-Renault	1:15.757	1:15.234	no time^{3}	9
11	12	(Germany) Nico Hülkenberg	Force India-Mercedes	1:15.418	1:15.421		10
12	14	(Japan) Kamui Kobayashi	Sauber-Ferrari	1:15.648	1:15.508		11
13	3	(United Kingdom) Jenson Button	McLaren-Mercedes	1:16.399	1:15.536		12
14	19	(Brazil) Bruno Senna	Williams-Renault	1:15.923	1:15.709		13
15	11	(United Kingdom) Paul di Resta	Force India-Mercedes	1:16.062	1:15.718		14
16	16	(Australia) Daniel Ricciardo	Toro Rosso-Ferrari	1:16.360	1:15.878		15
17	17	(France) Jean-Éric Vergne	Toro Rosso-Ferrari	1:16.491	1:16.885		16
18	20	(Finland) Heikki Kovalainen	Caterham-Renault	1:16.538			17
19	21	(Russia) Vitaly Petrov	Caterham-Renault	1:17.404			18
20	24	(Germany) Timo Glock	Marussia-Cosworth	1:17.947			19
21	22	(Spain) Pedro de la Rosa	HRT-Cosworth	1:18.096			20
22	25	(France) Charles Pic	Marussia-Cosworth	1:18.476			21
23	23	(India) Narain Karthikeyan	HRT-Cosworth	1:19.310			22
107% time: 1:20.697
—	15	(Mexico) Sergio Pérez	Sauber-Ferrari	no time			24^{4}

Notes:

^1 – Michael Schumacher received a five-place grid penalty for causing an avoidable collision with Bruno Senna at the Spanish Grand Prix.
^2 – Pastor Maldonado received a ten-place grid penalty for causing an avoidable collision with Sergio Pérez during free practice on Saturday morning. He was given an additional five-place penalty for a gearbox change after qualifying.
^3 – Sebastian Vettel did not complete a timed lap – only commencing exploratory/sighting laps. This was due to tactical reasons in regards to tyre preservation for the race, and also choice of either dry compound for the race start.
^4 – Sergio Pérez failed to set a time in qualifying after a crash in the first period. However, stewards allowed him to race due to competitive free practice times. This would mean he would start 24th, but when Pastor Maldonado had his gearbox changed Pérez was promoted to 23rd on the grid. He received a five-place grid penalty for changing his gearbox after he was granted access to enter the race by the stewards, leaving the Sauber driver 24th overall with Maldonado promoted to 23rd ahead.

=== Race ===
Pos	No	Driver	Constructor	Laps	Time/Retired	Grid	Points
1	2	(Australia) Mark Webber	Red Bull-Renault	78	1:46:06.557	1	25
2	8	(Germany) Nico Rosberg	Mercedes	78	+0.643	2	18
3	5	(Spain) Fernando Alonso	Ferrari	78	+0.947	5	15
4	1	(Germany) Sebastian Vettel	Red Bull-Renault	78	+1.343	9	12
5	4	(United Kingdom) Lewis Hamilton	McLaren-Mercedes	78	+4.101	3	10
6	6	(Brazil) Felipe Massa	Ferrari	78	+6.195	7	8
7	11	(United Kingdom) Paul di Resta	Force India-Mercedes	78	+41.537	14	6
8	12	(Germany) Nico Hülkenberg	Force India-Mercedes	78	+42.562	10	4
9	9	(Finland) Kimi Räikkönen	Lotus-Renault	78	+44.036	8	2
10	19	(Brazil) Bruno Senna	Williams-Renault	78	+44.516	13	1
11	15	(Mexico) Sergio Pérez	Sauber-Ferrari	77	+1 Lap	23	
12	17	(France) Jean-Éric Vergne	Toro Rosso-Ferrari	77	+1 Lap	16	
13	20	(Finland) Heikki Kovalainen	Caterham-Renault	77	+1 Lap	17	
14	24	(Germany) Timo Glock	Marussia-Cosworth	77	+1 Lap	19	
15	23	(India) Narain Karthikeyan	HRT-Cosworth	76	+2 Laps	22	
16	3	(United Kingdom) Jenson Button	McLaren-Mercedes	70	Collision	12	
Ret	16	(Australia) Daniel Ricciardo	Toro Rosso-Ferrari	65	Steering	15	
Ret	25	(France) Charles Pic	Marussia-Cosworth	64	Electrical	21	
Ret	7	(Germany) Michael Schumacher	Mercedes	63	Fuel pressure	6	
Ret	21	(Russia) Vitaly Petrov	Caterham-Renault	15	Electrical	18	
Ret	14	(Japan) Kamui Kobayashi	Sauber-Ferrari	5	Collision damage	11	
Ret	10	(France) Romain Grosjean	Lotus-Renault	0	Collision	4	
Ret	22	(Spain) Pedro de la Rosa	HRT-Cosworth	0	Collision	20	
Ret	18	(Venezuela) Pastor Maldonado	Williams-Renault	0	Collision	24	

== Championship standings after the race ==
Drivers' Championship standings

	Pos.	Driver	Points
1	1	(Spain) Fernando Alonso	76
1	2	(Germany) Sebastian Vettel	73
2	3	(Australia) Mark Webber	73
1	4	(United Kingdom) Lewis Hamilton	63
2	5	(Germany) Nico Rosberg	59

Constructors' Championship standings

	Pos.	Constructor	Points
	1	(Austria) Red Bull-Renault	146
	2	(United Kingdom) McLaren-Mercedes	108
1	3	(Italy) Ferrari	86
1	4	(United Kingdom) Lotus-Renault	86
	5	(Germany) Mercedes	61

- Note: Only the top five positions are included for both sets of standings.

== See also ==
- 2012 Monaco GP2 Series round
- 2012 Monaco GP3 Series round

== Notes ==
Previous race: 2012 Spanish Grand Prix	FIA Formula One World Championship; 2012 season	Next race: 2012 Canadian Grand Prix
Previous race: 2011 Monaco Grand Prix	Monaco Grand Prix	Next race: 2013 Monaco Grand Prix
