= Paul di Resta =

British racing driver (born 1986)

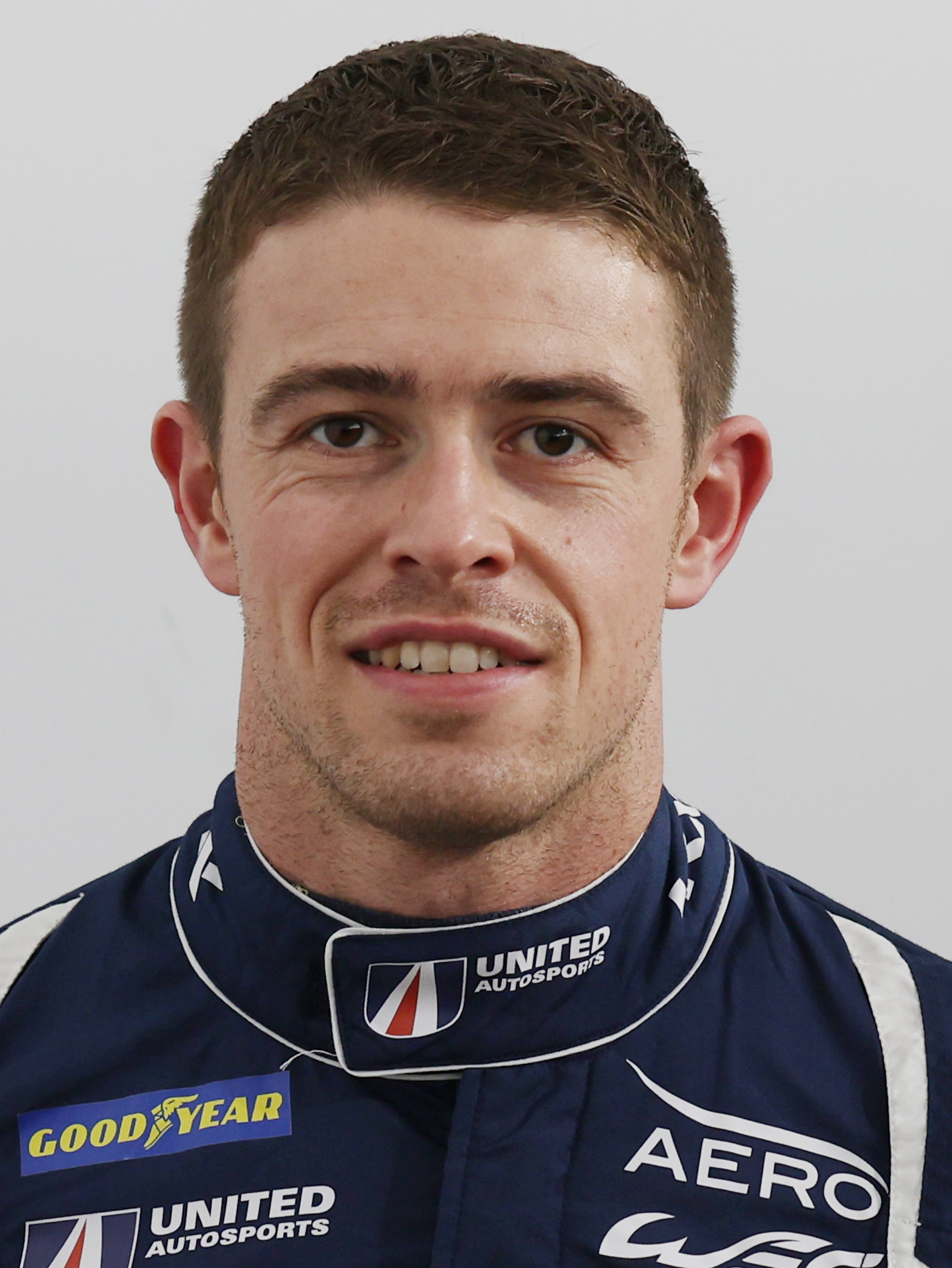
- Di Resta in 2022
- Born: 16 April 1986 (age 40); Uphall, West Lothian, Scotland
- Spouse: Laura Jordan (m. 2014)
- Children: 2
- Relatives: Dougie McCracken (step-father); Jon McCracken (half-brother); Dario Franchitti (cousin); Marino Franchitti (cousin)

FIA World Endurance Championship career
- Debut season: 2019–20
- Current team: Peugeot TotalEnergies
- Categorisation: FIA Platinum
- Car number: 94
- Former teams: United
- Starts: 44
- Championships: 0
- Wins: 5
- Podiums: 9
- Poles: 4
- Fastest laps: 1
- Best finish: 2nd in 2019–20 (LMP2)

Formula One World Championship career
- Nationality: (United Kingdom) British
- Active years: 2011–2013, 2017
- Team(s): Force India, Williams
- Entries: 59 (59 starts)
- Championships: 0
- Wins: 0
- Podiums: 0
- Career points: 121
- Pole positions: 0
- Fastest laps: 0
- First entry: 2011 Australian Grand Prix
- Last entry: 2017 Hungarian Grand Prix

Deutsche Tourenwagen Masters career
- Years active: 2007–2010, 2014–2019
- Teams: Persson, HWA, R-Motorsport
- Starts: 141
- Championships: 1 (2010)
- Wins: 11
- Podiums: 37
- Poles: 8
- Fastest laps: 10

24 Hours of Le Mans career
- Years: 2018–2021, 2023–2024
- Teams: United, Peugeot
- Best finish: 5th (2020)
- Class wins: 1 (2020)

Previous series
- 2005–2006 2003–2004: F3 Euro Series; British Formula Renault

Championship titles
- 2006 2010: F3 Euro Series; DTM

Paul di Resta (born 16 April 1986) is a British racing driver and broadcaster from Scotland, who competes in the FIA World Endurance Championship for Peugeot. Di Resta competed in Formula One between 2011 and 2017. (Note: The exact years di Resta competed in Formula One: 2011–2013, 2017.)

Born in Uphall and raised in Bathgate, di Resta drove in Formula One for Force India from 2011 to 2013, and became a reserve driver for the Williams F1 team in 2016, driving a single race for them as a substitute driver in 2017. A former Deutsche Tourenwagen Masters (DTM) and Formula 3 Euro Series champion, di Resta did not secure a Formula One seat for 2014, instead rejoining Mercedes to race again in DTM. He later became a reserve F1 driver for McLaren from 2020 to 2022, and a commentator for Sky Sports' coverage of F1. Additionally, di Resta has raced at the 24 Hours of Le Mans for United Autosports in LMP2 and for Peugeot in Hypercar.

== Personal life ==
Paul di Resta was born on 16 April 1986 in Uphall, West Lothian, Scotland. Di Resta is of Italian descent and grew up in Bathgate. He is a former pupil of Bathgate Academy and supports Celtic Football Club. He now lives in Monaco, and is a cousin of racing drivers Dario and Marino Franchitti. His step-father was Scottish footballer Dougie McCracken. His younger brother, Stefan, has raced at an amateur level and his half-brother, Jon, is a goalkeeper for association football club Dundee.

Di Resta and Laura Jordan became engaged in December 2013 and married on 28 August 2014.

== Career ==
=== Karting ===
Di Resta started his career in karting, racing in various competitive series of karts from 1994 until 2002. In 2001, he won the British JICA Championship.

=== Formula Renault ===
Di Resta stepped up to single-seaters at the end of 2002, when he competed in the British Formula Renault Winter Series. He raced in British Formula Renault full-time in 2003 with the Eurotek Motorsport team, finishing seventh in the standings with one race win. He switched to Manor Motorsport for 2004, finishing third in the championship standings with four wins. He also entered some races of Eurocup Formula Renault 2.0 with the Manor team. He also won the McLaren Autosport BRDC Young Driver of The Year Award in 2004. The award had been won by his cousin Dario Franchitti in 1992.

=== Formula Three ===
Di Resta switched to the Formula Three Euroseries with Manor Motorsport in 2005, finishing tenth in the standings. For 2006, he moved to the ASM Formule 3 team, winning the championship with five wins, beating teammate and future Formula One World Drivers' Champion, Sebastian Vettel. Di Resta also won the 2006 BP Ultimate Masters at Circuit Park Zandvoort.

=== DTM ===
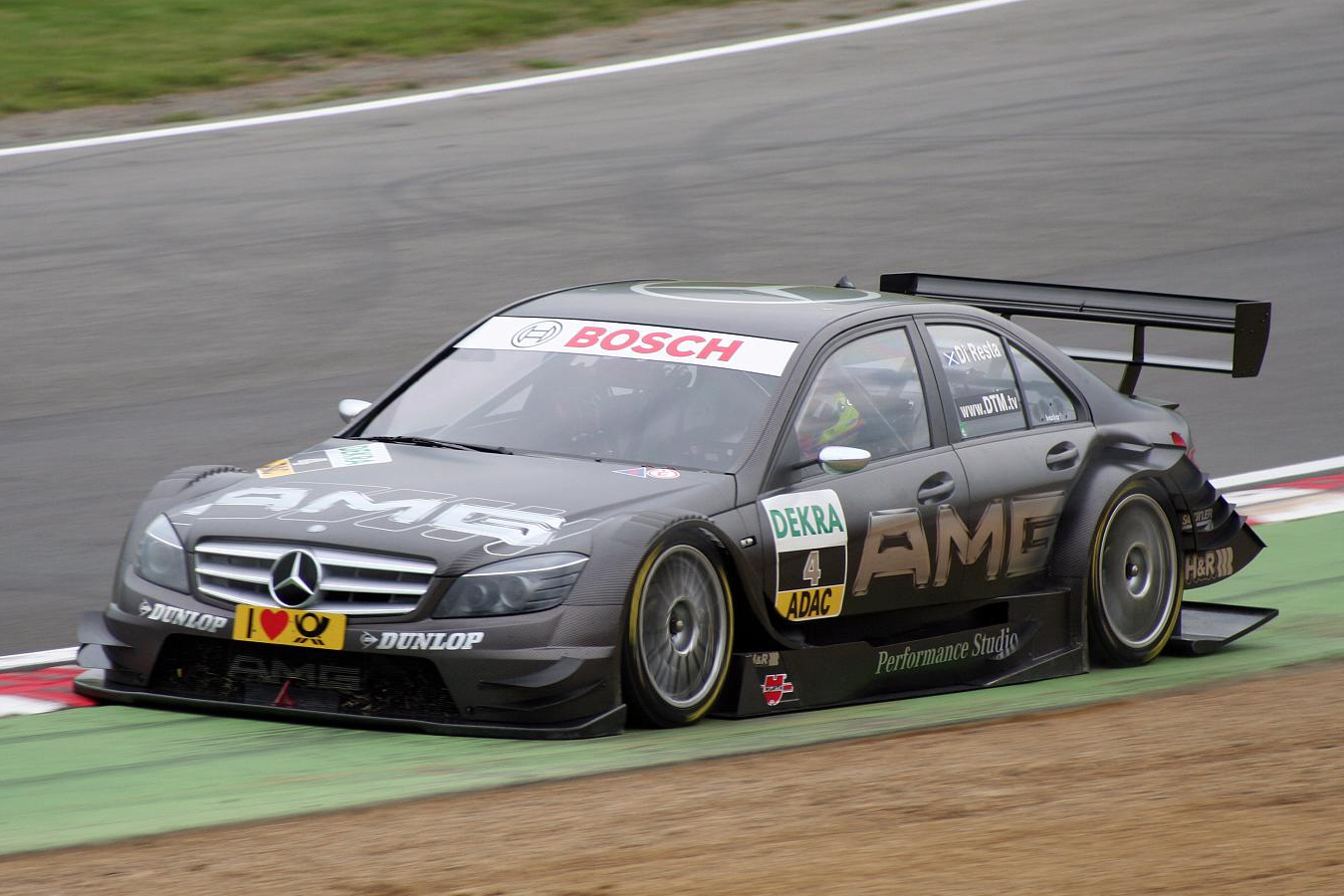
Di Resta finished runner-up in the 2008 Deutsche Tourenwagen Masters season.

In 2007, di Resta switched from single-seaters to race in the Deutsche Tourenwagen Masters (DTM) touring car racing series, for Mercedes. In the championship, he finished fifth overall behind drivers Mattias Ekström (who won his second DTM title), Bruno Spengler, Martin Tomczyk and Jamie Green. Di Resta was the highest driver in the standings to drive a non-2007 car. His performances earned him a 2008 Mercedes C Klasse for the 2008 season, in which he won two races and finished second in the points, four points behind eventual champion Timo Scheider of Audi. In 2009, he finished third overall behind Scheider and compatriot Gary Paffett. In 2010, he won three races in a row on the way to winning the championship.

=== Formula One ===
Di Resta tested for the McLaren Formula One team, and was in the frame for a drive with the Force India team for the 2009 season due to the teams' shared engine supplier, Mercedes-Benz. However, Force India chose to retain Giancarlo Fisichella and Adrian Sutil, with Vitantonio Liuzzi as reserve driver.

==== Force India (2010–2013) ====
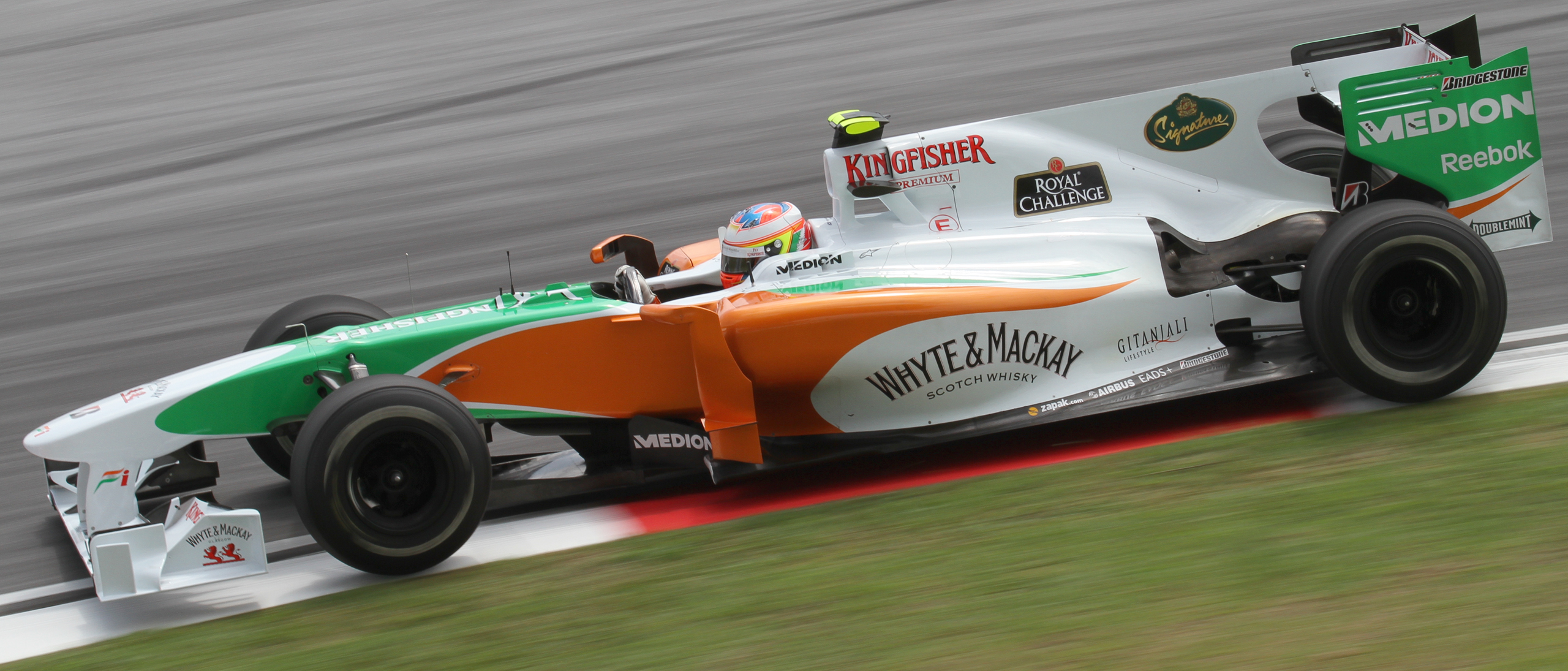
Di Resta during practice at the 2010 Malaysian Grand Prix.

===== 2010 =====
In December 2009, with Fisichella having moved to Ferrari and Liuzzi being promoted to the race team, di Resta took part in a test with the team at the Jerez circuit alongside J. R. Hildebrand. At the Autosport International show in January 2010, he was said to be close to a deal as the team's test and reserve driver for the 2010 season. The deal was announced on 2 February. Di Resta made his Formula One race meeting début at the 2010 Australian Grand Prix, where he took part in the first free practice session in place of Sutil and finished 11th. He drove in the first practice session of all the following races until the Monaco Grand Prix where he did not take part. He resumed driving for the team at the European Grand Prix and the following British Grand Prix. After sitting out the German Grand Prix he returned for the Hungarian Grand Prix. Di Resta subsequently sat out the Belgian Grand Prix as Tonio Liuzzi and Adrian Sutil needed as much track-time as possible to get the feeling of the new parts. He participated in practice for the Italian Grand Prix, but did not participate in the Singapore or Japanese Grands Prix. The team elected that di Resta should miss the Korean Grand Prix to allow Liuzzi and Sutil to get used to the new track for the race.

===== 2011 =====
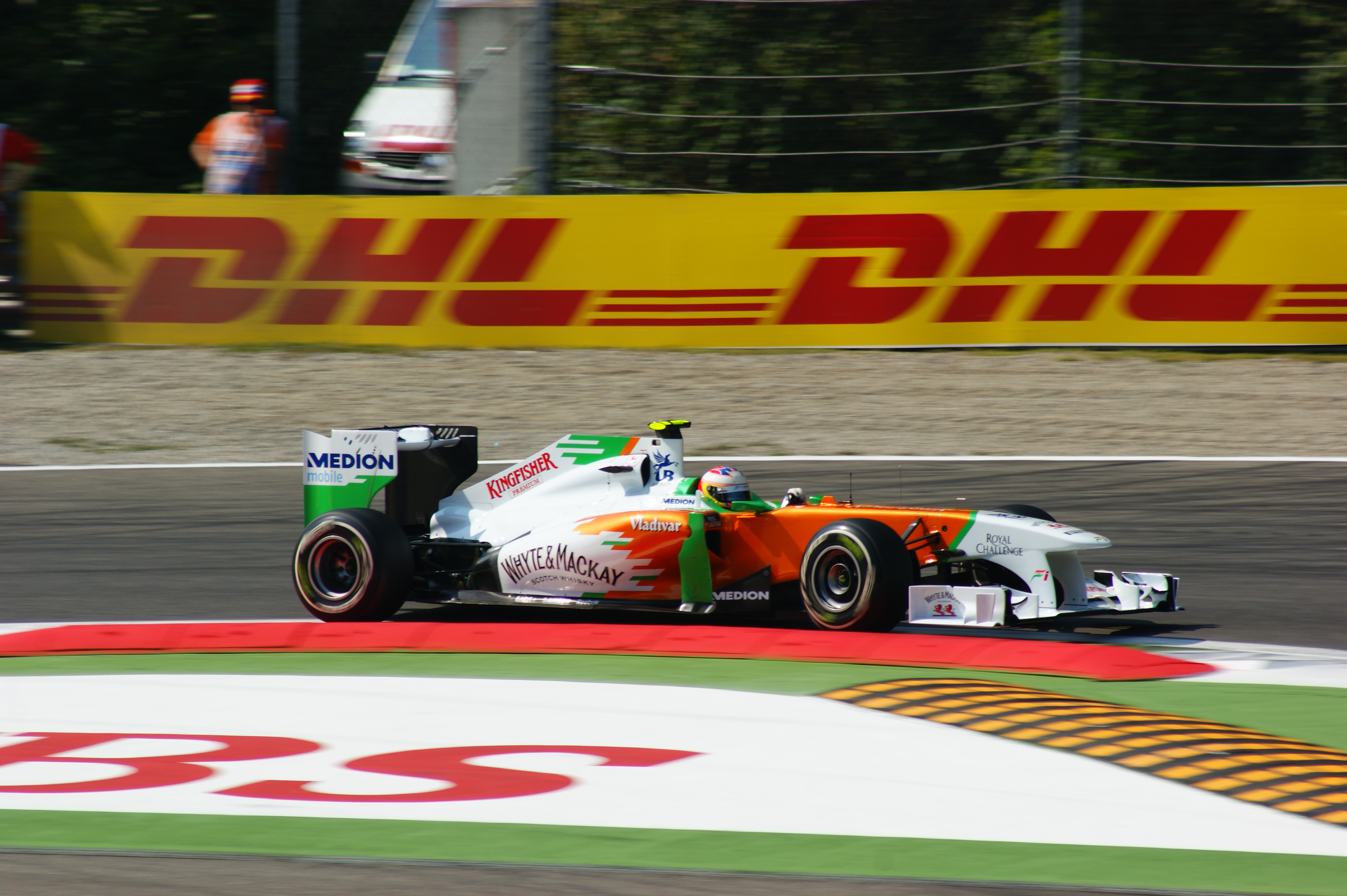
Di Resta at the 2011 Italian Grand Prix

Di Resta joined Adrian Sutil in the Force India Formula One racing team for the 2011 season, replacing Vitantonio Liuzzi. He scored his first championship point at his first race, the Australian Grand Prix, after both Saubers were disqualified. This was followed by another tenth place in Malaysia, 11th in China, and a retirement in Turkey, where he left the pits with a loose wheel. He was running fifth in Canada until a collision with Nick Heidfeld left him with a damaged car and a drive-through penalty, and later crashed out of the race on lap 67. He qualified sixth at Silverstone but finished 15th after a long pitstop due to a tyre mix-up.

His third points-scoring finish of the season came in Hungary, where he finished seventh in changeable conditions. In the Italian Grand Prix he finished eighth. This was followed by a career-best sixth-place finish in Singapore, ahead of teammate Sutil, who finished eighth. He finished tenth in Korea, ninth in Abu Dhabi and eighth in Brazil.

===== 2012 =====
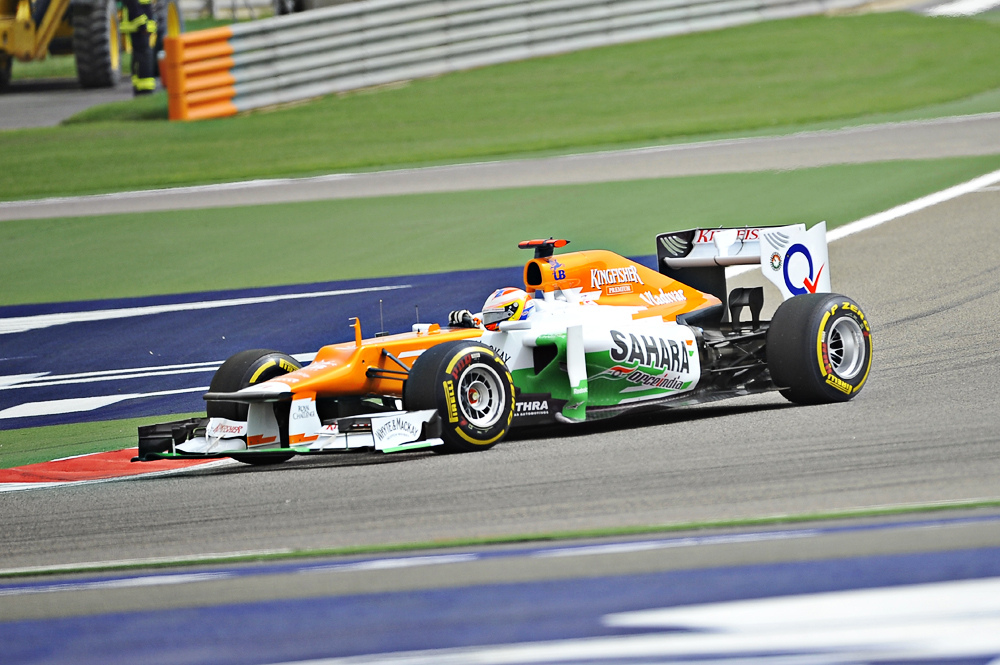
Di Resta driving for Force India at the 2012 Bahrain Grand Prix.

On 16 December 2011, it was announced that he was to be retained by Force India for the 2012 season, with Nico Hülkenberg taking the place of Sutil as his teammate. He qualified 15th for the season opener in Australia and finished tenth in the race, passing Jean-Éric Vergne and Nico Rosberg on the final lap. He qualified 14th for the Malaysian Grand Prix, and finished seventh in the wet race. He was 12th in China. In Bahrain, he qualified inside the top-ten, having missed the second free practice session after several members of the team were caught up in a petrol bomb incident. Using a two-stop strategy, he took sixth place in the race, which equalled his previous career-best result. He was 14th in Spain, a lap behind winner Pastor Maldonado; seventh in Monaco having started 15th on the grid; and 11th in Montreal. = At the European Grand Prix, he was the only driver on the grid who performed a one-stop strategy and came seventh whilst his teammate, Nico Hülkenberg, finished in fifth position.

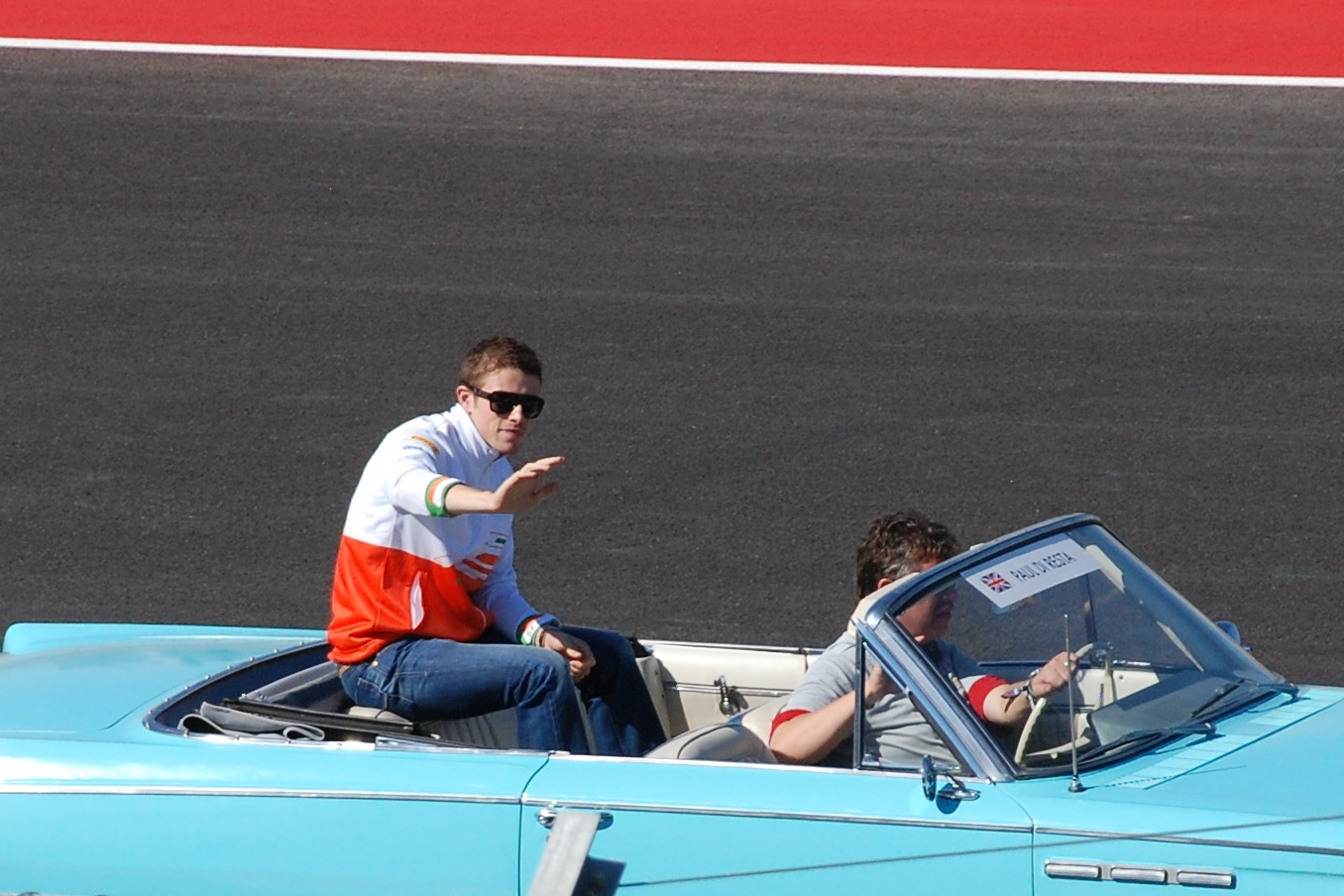
Di Resta at the 2012 US Grand Prix

After failing to score a point in the next three races, di Resta finished tenth in Belgium. The following weekend, at the Italian Grand Prix, di Resta showed strong pace in qualifying, setting the fourth fastest time in Q3, but took a five place grid penalty for a gearbox change to start the Grand Prix in ninth. He finished the race in eighth. At the Singapore Grand Prix, he qualified sixth and finished a career-best fourth, after the retirements of Maldonado and Hamilton. The final five races of the season resulted in only one further points-scoring finish – ninth place in Abu Dhabi.

===== 2013 =====
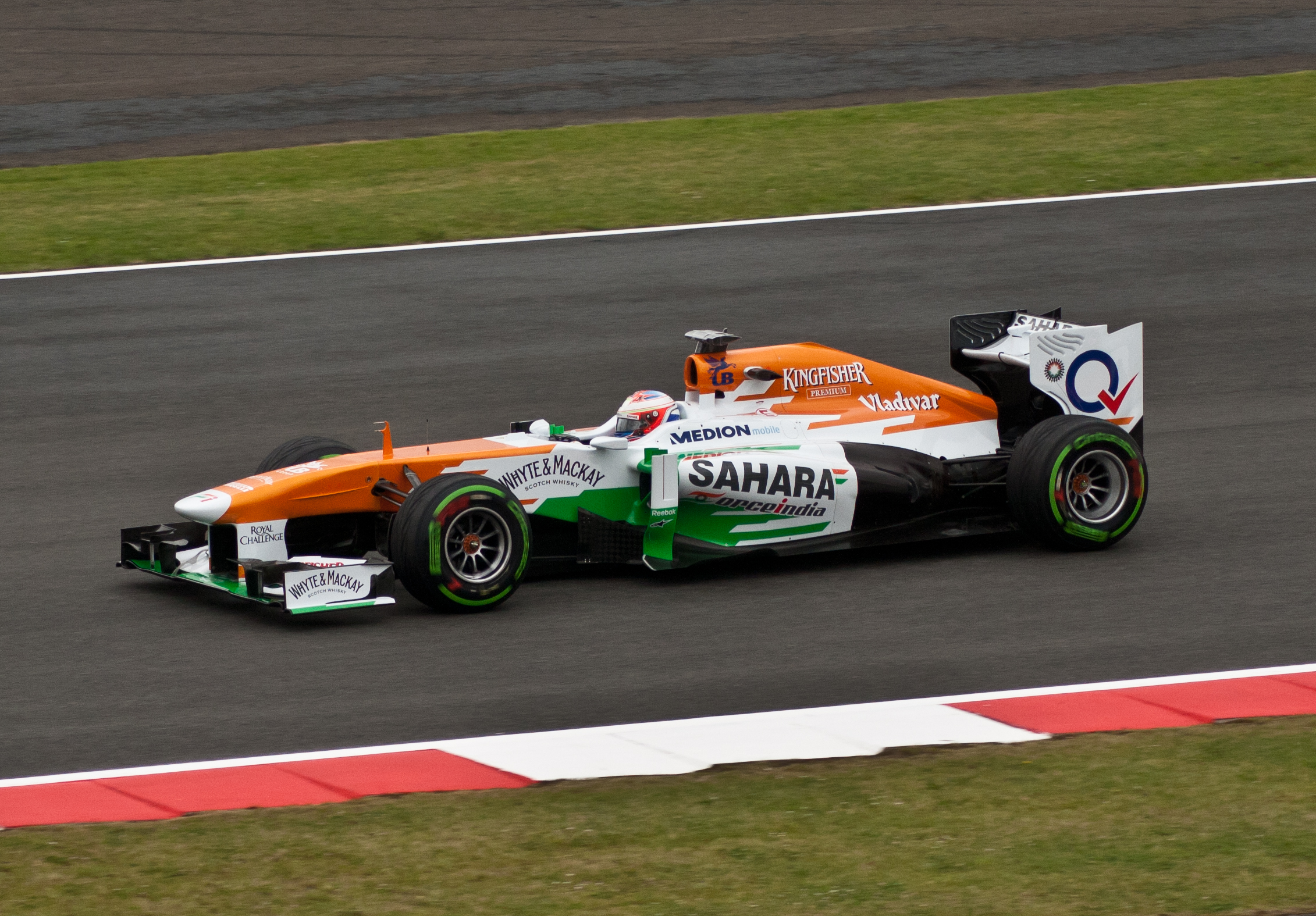
Di Resta at the 2013 British Grand Prix

On 31 January 2013, Force India confirmed di Resta would race for the team for a third consecutive season in 2013. After qualifying outside the top-ten in Australia, di Resta managed to battle through into the points, finishing just behind his teammate, Adrian Sutil in eighth place. In Malaysia, however di Resta retired after his car's wheel nuts kept jamming, and the team was ultimately forced to retire both cars.

Qualifying in 11th place for the Chinese Grand Prix, the race saw him finish in eighth place and he obtained four points.

Di Resta matched his career best result in Bahrain with a fourth place, being overtaken close to the end by Lotus's Romain Grosjean, depriving the Scot of a maiden podium. He followed that up with a seventh in Spain.

A disappointing qualifying session in the wet meant di Resta started from 17th in Monaco, however initially going for an aggressive two stop strategy; luck played its part and due to a red flag he was able to use a new set of tyres, and made ground to ninth-place finish with some good overtakes.

Another disappointing qualifying session at the next race in Canada saw di Resta starting in 17th position yet again. Starting on the harder medium compound tyre, di Resta was able to run the longest of all drivers on his first stint, going 56 laps before finally making his only pit stop. The strategy worked as di Resta finished the race in seventh.

After six consecutive point finishes, di Resta struggled in the later part of the season as Force India struggled to cope with new Pirelli tyres and he recorded five consecutive retirements.

On 12 December, it was announced that di Resta would not be retained as a driver with Force India for the 2014 season.

==== Williams (2016–2017) ====
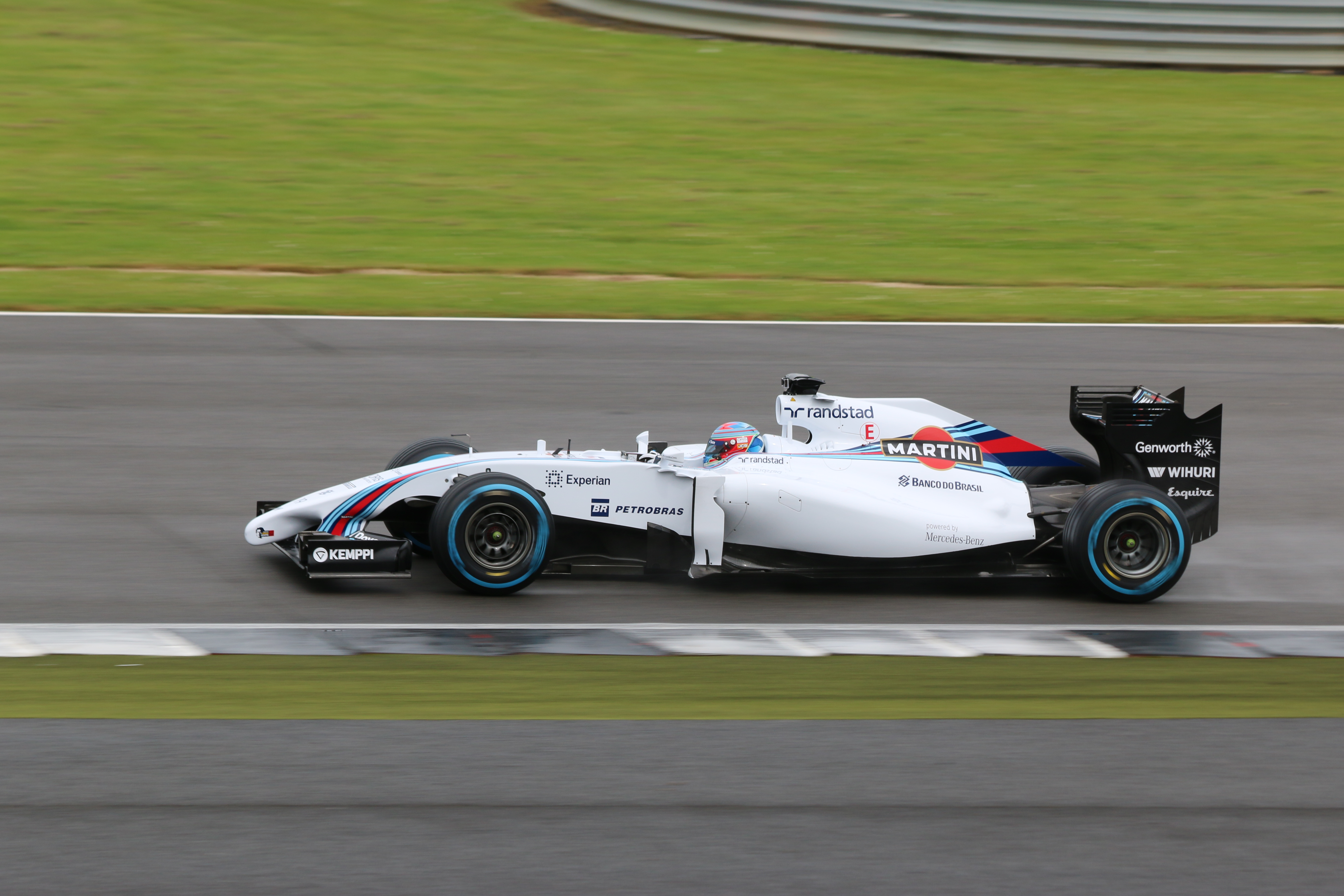
Di Resta performing a TPC (Testing of Previous Cars) namely the 2014 Williams FW36 as part of his role as Williams reserve driver.

===== 2016 =====
After a two-year absence from the sport, di Resta returned to Formula One as reserve driver for Williams.

===== 2017 =====
Williams retained di Resta as their reserve driver for 2017 whilst he competed for Mercedes in DTM.

Di Resta replaced lead driver Felipe Massa for qualifying and the race at the Hungarian Grand Prix as the Brazilian recovered from an illness. This marked di Resta's first F1 start in almost four years, whilst also becoming the first British driver for Williams since Jenson Button in 2000 and Scottish driver since David Coulthard in 1995. His qualifying results were described as an "unbelievable job" by Mercedes F1 Director Toto Wolff, having competed without having driven the FW40 prior to the session. He ended the day in 19th place ahead of Marcus Ericsson and was 0.766s off his teammate Lance Stroll. He retired in the race after 60 laps.

==== McLaren (2020–2022) ====
After another absence from Formula One, di Resta returned to the sport as a reserve driver after McLaren put him on standby for the 70th Anniversary Grand Prix at the Silverstone Circuit in Silverstone, United Kingdom. McLaren retained di Resta as a stand-in reserve driver for the 2021 and 2022 seasons while he competed in the FIA World Endurance Championship.

=== DTM return (2014–2019) ===
In May 2014, di Resta returned to the Deutsche Tourenwagen Masters series driving for HWA Team, who manage the AMG Mercedes team in DTM. Di Resta finished the 2014 season in 15th place having scored points only three times, all three being fourth-place finishes.

Di Resta finished the 2018 season in third place in the driver's championship, after winning three races at Hungaroring, Brands Hatch, and Misano.

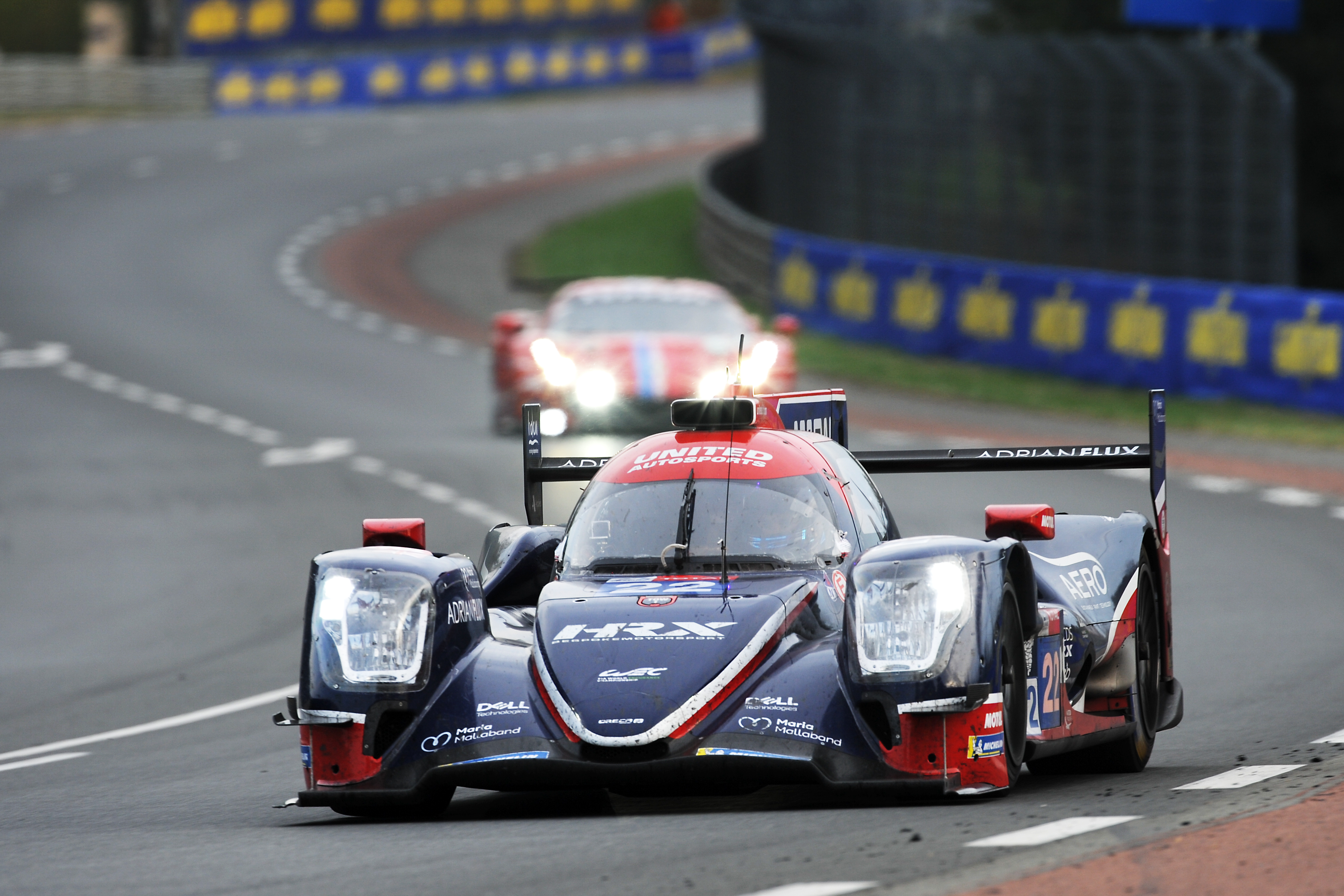
Di Resta was part of the winning LMP2 class during the 2020 24 Hours of Le Mans

In 2019, after five seasons driving for Mercedes, di Resta joined the Swiss motor racing team R-Motorsport, driving the Aston Martin Vantage DTM. Di Resta finished in 16th place having scored points only four times.

=== Endurance racing (2019–present) ===
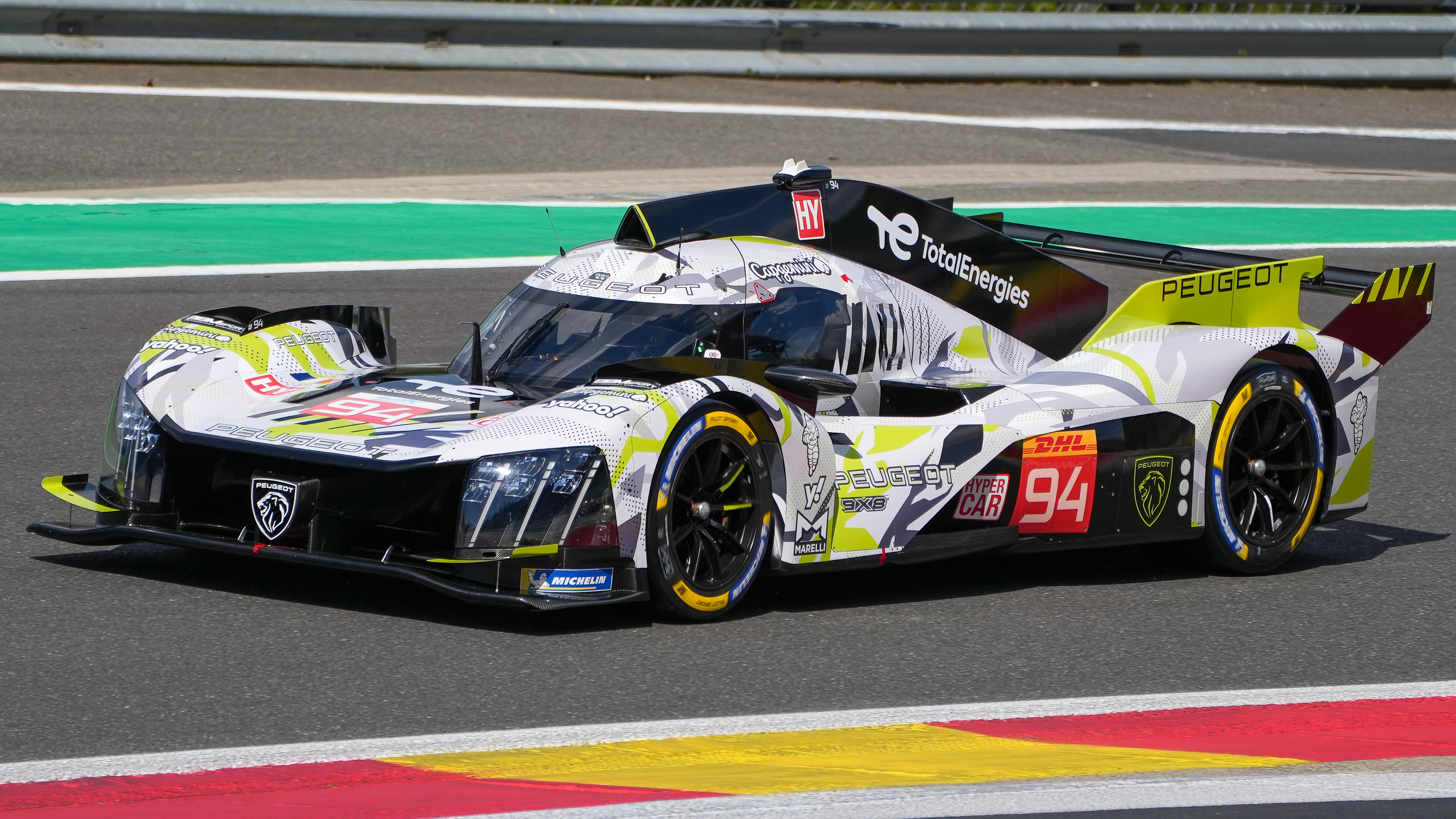
Di Resta competing at the 2024 6 Hours of Spa-Francorchamps.

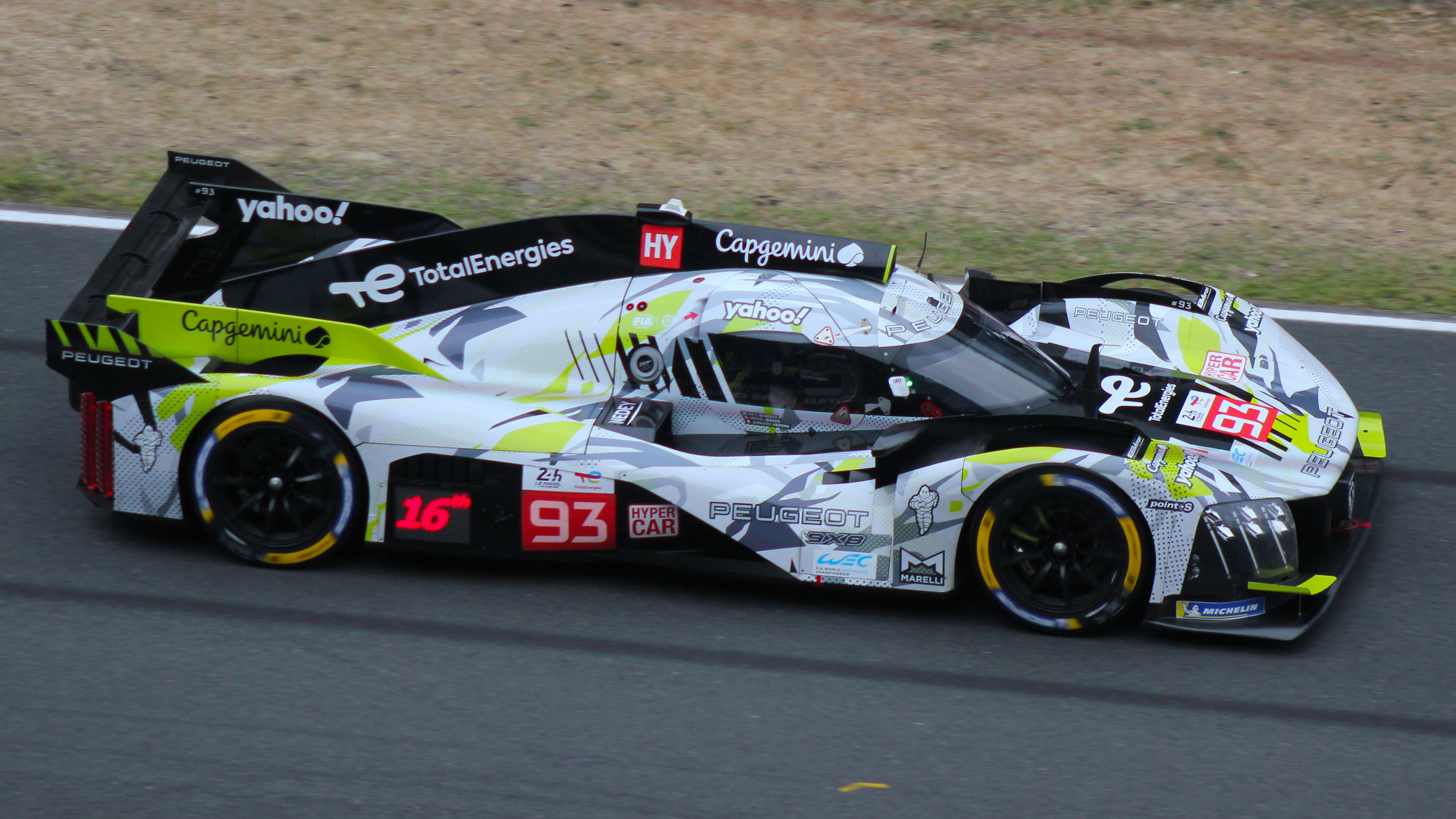
Di Resta's No. 93 car at the 2025 24 Hours of Le Mans

In 2018, di Resta raced in the Asian Le Mans Series for United Autosports, scoring one win and four podiums alongside Phil Hanson and eventually winning the 2018-19 Asian Le Mans Series championship.

Following their Asian Le Mans Series win, di Resta and United Autosport competed in the 2019-20 FIA World Endurance Championship going onto to win the 2020 24 Hours of Le Mans alongside Hanson and Filipe Albuquerque in the LMP2 Class and finishing fifth overall.

On February 8, 2021, Peugeot Sport revealed di Resta would drive their LMH Hypercar entry in the 2022 FIA World Endurance Championship alongside Mikkel Jensen and Jean-Éric Vergne. He, and the Peugeot team, competed in the last three races of the season with a fourth place finish in the 6 Hours of Fuji and two retirements in the 6 Hours of Monza and the 8 Hours of Bahrain. In the end, di Resta finished in tenth in the Driver's championship.

=== Broadcasting career (2016–2023) ===
==== Sky Sports F1 (2016–2023) ====
Since 2016, Di Resta has been a regular contributor to the Sky Sports F1 channel. He was a common presence as a co-commentator, analyst and one of the insiders in "Sky Race Control" during practices, qualifying sessions and races, alongside Jenson Button, Karun Chandhok, Anthony Davidson, Damon Hill, Nico Rosberg, and Johnny Herbert until being axed by Sky Sports in Jan 2023 along with Johnny Herbert.

== Karting record ==
=== Karting career summary ===
Season	Series	Team	Position
1999	Torneo Industrie Open — 100 Junior		36th
1999	CIK-FIA Green Helmet Trophy – Cadet		3rd
1999	Monaco Kart Cup — ICA Junior		2nd
2000	South Garda Winter Cup — ICA Junior		2nd
2000	Super 1 National Championship — JICA		2nd
2000	European Championship — ICA Junior		10th
2001	Super 1 National Championship — JICA		1st
2002	South Garda Winter Cup — Formula A		11th
2002	Super 1 National Championship — Formula A		6th
2002	European Championship — Formula A	Italsport KRP	NC
2002	World Cup — Formula A	Italsport KRP	17th
2011	ERDF Masters Kart — Stars		8th

== Racing record ==
=== Racing career summary ===
Season	Series	Team	Races	Wins	Poles	F/Laps	Podiums	Points	Position
2003	Formula Renault UK	Eurotek Motorsport	10	0	0	0	0	233	7th
2003	Formula Renault UK	Team JVA	7	1	2	1	2	233	7th
2004	Formula Renault UK	Manor Motorsport	20	4	4	2	9	415	**3rd**
2004	Formula Renault 2000 Eurocup	Manor Motorsport	3	0	0	0	1	0	NC†
2004	Bahrain Superprix	Manor Motorsport	1	0	0	0	0	N/A	NC
2005	Formula 3 Euro Series	Manor Motorsport	19	0	3	2	1	32	10th
2005	Masters of Formula 3	Manor Motorsport	1	0	0	0	0	N/A	4th
2006	Formula 3 Euro Series	ASM Formule 3	20	5	5	1	9	86	**1st**
2006	Masters of Formula 3	ASM Formule 3	1	1	0	0	0	N/A	**1st**
2006	Macau Grand Prix	ASM Formule 3	1	0	0	0	0	N/A	NC
2007	Deutsche Tourenwagen Masters	Persson Motorsport	10	0	0	0	4	32	5th
2008	Deutsche Tourenwagen Masters	HWA Team	11	2	1	4	7	71	**2nd**
2009	Deutsche Tourenwagen Masters	HWA Team	10	1	1	2	3	45	**3rd**
2010	Deutsche Tourenwagen Masters	HWA Team	11	3	3	1	7	71	**1st**
2010	Formula One	Force India F1 Team	Test driver						
2011	Formula One	Force India F1 Team	19	0	0	0	0	27	13th
2012	Formula One	Sahara Force India F1 Team	20	0	0	0	0	46	14th
2013	Formula One	Sahara Force India F1 Team	19	0	0	0	0	48	12th
2014	Deutsche Tourenwagen Masters	HWA Team	10	0	0	0	0	36	15th
2015	Deutsche Tourenwagen Masters	HWA AG	18	0	0	1	3	90	8th
2016	Deutsche Tourenwagen Masters	Mercedes-Benz DTM Team HWA II	18	1	1	1	4	116	5th
2016	Formula One	Williams Martini Racing	Reserve driver						
2017	Deutsche Tourenwagen Masters	Mercedes-AMG Motorsport SILBERPFEIL Energy	18	1	0	0	3	99	11th
2017	Formula One	Williams Martini Racing	1	0	0	0	0	0	NC
2018	Deutsche Tourenwagen Masters	Mercedes-AMG Motorsport REMUS	20	3	2	1	6	233	**3rd**
2018	IMSA SportsCar Championship - Prototype	United Autosports	3	0	0	0	0	82	27th
2018	24 Hours of Le Mans - LMP2	United Autosports	1	0	0	0	0	N/A	DNF
2018–19	Asian Le Mans Series - LMP2	United Autosports	4	1	1	0	4	80	**1st**
2019	Deutsche Tourenwagen Masters	R-Motorsport I	15	0	0	0	0	21	16th
2019	European Le Mans Series - LMP2	United Autosports	1	0	0	0	0	8	19th
2019	24 Hours of Le Mans - LMP2	United Autosports	1	0	0	0	0	N/A	4th
2019–20	FIA World Endurance Championship - LMP2	United Autosports	7	4	4	1	5	175	**2nd**
2020	24 Hours of Le Mans – LMP2	United Autosports	1	1	1	0	1	N/A	**1st**
2020	Formula One	McLaren F1 Team	Reserve driver						
2021	FIA World Endurance Championship - LMP2	United Autosports USA	1	0	0	0	1	23	16th
2021	Formula One	McLaren F1 Team	Reserve driver						
2022	FIA World Endurance Championship - Hypercar	Peugeot TotalEnergies	3	0	0	0	0	12	10th
2022	FIA World Endurance Championship - LMP2	United Autosports USA	1	1	0	0	1	38	11th
2022	Asian Le Mans Series - LMP2	United Autosports USA	2	2	2	2	2	0	NC†
2022	24 Hours of Le Mans - LMP2	United Autosports USA	Reserve driver						
2022	Formula One	McLaren F1 Team	Reserve driver						
2023	FIA World Endurance Championship - Hypercar	Peugeot TotalEnergies	7	0	0	0	1	51	8th
2023	24 Hours of Le Mans - Hypercar	Peugeot TotalEnergies	1	0	0	0	0	N/A	8th
2023	Asian Le Mans Series - LMP2	United Autosports	4	0	0	1	0	36	8th
2023	European Le Mans Series - LMP2 Pro-Am	United Autosports	2	0	0	0	0	1	22nd
2023	European Le Mans Series - LMP2	United Autosports	1	0	0	0	0	0	NC†
2024	FIA World Endurance Championship - Hypercar	Peugeot TotalEnergies	8	0	0	0	0	4	28th
2024	IMSA SportsCar Championship - LMP2	United Autosports USA	6	0	0	0	1	1592	15th
2024	European Le Mans Series - LMP2	United Autosports	6	0	0	0	0	27	11th
2025	FIA World Endurance Championship - Hypercar	Peugeot TotalEnergies	8	0	0	0	1	44	12th
2025	IMSA SportsCar Championship - LMP2	United Autosports USA	6	2	1	0	2	1765	12th
2025–26	Asian Le Mans Series - LMP2	United Autosports	6	0	0	0	0	28	10th
2026	IMSA SportsCar Championship - LMP2	United Autosports USA	6	0	1	0	2	1837	7th
2026	FIA World Endurance Championship - Hypercar	Peugeot TotalEnergies	8	0	0	0	0	10	21st

^{†}– As di Resta was a guest driver, he was ineligible to score points.

=== Complete Formula Renault 2.0 UK record ===
(key)

Year	Team	1	2	3	4	5	6	7	8	9	10	11	12	13	14	15	16	17	18	19	20	Pos	Points
2003	Eurotek Motorsport	SNE; 1; 8	SNE; 2; 22	BRH; 6	THR; 13	SIL; 13	ROC; Ret	CRO; 1; 10	CRO; 2; 9	DON; 1; 6	DON; 2; 9											7th	233
2003	Team JVA											SNE; 6	BRH; 1; 8	BRH; 2; 6	DON; 1; 19	DON; 2; 6	**OUL**; **1**; 1	**OUL**; **2**; 2				7th	233
2004	Manor Motorsport	**THR**; **1**; 1	**THR**; **2**; 1	BRH; 1; 4	**BRH**; **2**; 2	SIL; 1; 3	**SIL**; **2**; 1	OUL; 1; 2	**OUL**; **2**; 2	THR; 1; 2	THR; 2; 1	**CRO**; **1**; 1	**CRO**; **2**; 1	KNO; 1; 2	KNO; 2; 4	BRH; 1; 3	BRH; 2; 2	**SNE**; **1**; 1	**SNE**; **2**; 1	DON; 1	DON; 2	1st	518

=== Complete Formula 3 Euro Series record ===
(key)

Year	Team	1	2	3	4	5	6	7	8	9	10	11	12	13	14	15	16	17	18	19	20	Pos	Points
2005	Manor Motorsport	HOC; 1 Ret	**HOC**; **2**; 17	PAU; 1; 14	PAU; 2 DNS	SPA; 1 DSQ	SPA; 2; 5	MCO; 1; 8	MCO; 2; 6	OSC; 1; 4	OSC; 2; 4	NOR; 1; 3	NOR; 2; 8	**NÜR**; **1**; 23	NÜR; 2 Ret	ZAN; 1; 14	ZAN; 2; 5	LAU; 1 Ret	LAU; 2 DSQ	HOC; 1 Ret	HOC; 2 DSQ	10th	32
2006	ASM Formule 3	HOC; 1; 3	HOC; 2 Ret	**LAU**; **1**; 2	LAU; 2; 3	OSC; 1; 1	OSC; 2; 14	**BRH**; **1**; 1	BRH; 2; 5	NOR; 1; 1	NOR; 2; 18	NÜR; 1; 2	NÜR; 2; 13	**ZAN**; **1**; 1	ZAN; 2; 14	**CAT**; **1**; 10	CAT; 2; 6	BUG; 1; 1	BUG; 2; 6	**HOC**; **1** Ret	HOC; 2; 6	1st	86

=== Complete Deutsche Tourenwagen Masters results ===
(key) (Races in bold indicate pole position) (Races in italics indicate fastest lap)

Year	Team	Car	1	2	3	4	5	6	7	8	9	10	11	12	13	14	15	16	17	18	19	20	Pos.	Pts
2007	Persson Motorsport	AMG-Mercedes C-Klasse 2005	HOC; 5	OSC; 2	LAU; 2	BRH; Ret	NOR; 15	MUG; 3	ZAN; 14	NÜR; 6	CAT; 3	HOC; 8											5th	32
2008	HWA Team	AMG-Mercedes C-Klasse 2008	HOC; 13	OSC; 4	MUG; 2	**LAU**; 1	NOR; 5	ZAN; 7	NÜR; 2	BRH; 2	CAT; 1	BUG; 2	HOC; 2										2nd	71
2009	HWA Team	AMG-Mercedes C-Klasse 2009	HOC; 5	LAU; 4	NOR; 7	ZAN; 6	OSC; 4	NÜR; Ret	**BRH**; 1	CAT; 7	DIJ; 2	HOC; 3											3rd	45
2010	HWA Team	AMG-Mercedes C-Klasse 2009	HOC; 4	VAL; 5	**LAU**; 2	NOR; 10	NÜR; 2	ZAN; 2	**BRH**; 1	OSC; 1	HOC; 1	ADR; 9	**SHA**; 2										1st	71
2014	HWA Team	DTM AMG Mercedes C-Coupé	HOC; 14	OSC; 4	HUN; 18	NOR; 15	MSC; Ret	SPL; 18	NÜR; 4	LAU; Ret	ZAN; Ret	HOC; 4											15th	36
2015	HWA AG	DTM AMG Mercedes C-Coupé	HOC; 1; 3	HOC; 2; 22	LAU; 1; 14	LAU; 2; 15	NOR; 1 Ret	NOR; 2; 6	ZAN; 1 Ret	ZAN; 2; 14	SPL; 1; 3	SPL; 2; 9	MSC; 1; 14	MSC; 2; 15	OSC; 1; 13	OSC; 2; 6	NÜR; 1; 12	NÜR; 2; 2	HOC; 1; 4	HOC; 2; 4			8th	90
2016	Mercedes-Benz DTM Team HWA II	Mercedes-AMG C63 DTM	HOC; 1; 4	**HOC**; **2**; 1	SPL; 1; 7	SPL; 2; 15	LAU; 1; 13	LAU; 2; 21†	NOR; 1; 3	NOR; 2; 4	ZAN; 1; 15	ZAN; 2; 8	MSC; 1; 2	MSC; 2; 20	NÜR; 1; 6	NÜR; 2 Ret	HUN; 1 Ret	HUN; 2; 13	HOC; 1; 10	HOC; 2; 3			5th	116
2017	Mercedes-AMG Motorsport SILBERPFEIL Energy	Mercedes-AMG C63 DTM	HOC; 1; 8	HOC; 2; 6	LAU; 1; 16	LAU; 2; 13	HUN; 1; 1	HUN; 2; 6	NOR; 1; 11	NOR; 2; 6	MSC; 1; 14	MSC; 2 DSQ	ZAN; 1; 7	ZAN; 2 Ret	NÜR; 1; 2	NÜR; 2; 2	SPL; 1; 11	SPL; 2; 9	HOC; 1; 14	HOC; 2; 16			11th	99
2018	Mercedes-AMG Motorsport REMUS	Mercedes-AMG C63 DTM	HOC; 1; 7	HOC; 2; 9	LAU; 1; 6	LAU; 2; 4	**HUN**; **1**; 1	HUN; 2; 5	NOR; 1; 4	NOR; 2; 6	ZAN; 1; 2	ZAN; 2; 3	BRH; 1; 16	BRH; 2; 1	**MIS**; **1**; 1	MIS; 2; 6	NÜR; 1; 18	NÜR; 2; 2	SPL; 1; 4	SPL; 2; 4	HOC; 1; 8	HOC; 2; 14	3rd	233
2019	R-Motorsport I	Aston Martin Vantage DTM	HOC; 1 Ret	HOC; 2; 7	ZOL; 1; 8	ZOL; 2 DNS	MIS; 1; 16	MIS; 2 Ret	NOR; 1; 12	NOR; 2 Ret	ASS; 1; 14	ASS; 2; 8	BRH; 1; 14†	BRH; 2; 14	LAU; 1; 13	LAU; 2 Ret	NÜR; 1; 12	NÜR; 2 DNS	HOC; 1; 7	HOC; 2 DNS			16th	21

^{†} Driver did not finish, but was classified as he completed 90% of the race distance.

=== Complete Formula One results ===
(key) (Races in bold indicate pole position; races in italics indicate fastest lap)

Year	Entrant	Chassis	Engine	1	2	3	4	5	6	7	8	9	10	11	12	13	14	15	16	17	18	19	20	WDC	Points
2010	Force India F1 Team	Force India VJM03	Mercedes FO 108X 2.4 V8	BHR	AUS; TD	MAL; TD	CHN; TD	ESP; TD	MON	TUR	CAN	EUR; TD	GBR; TD	GER	HUN; TD	BEL	ITA; TD	SIN	JPN	KOR	BRA	ABU		–	–
2011	Force India F1 Team	Force India VJM04	Mercedes FO 108Y 2.4 V8	AUS; 10	MAL; 10	CHN; 11	TUR; Ret	ESP; 12	MON; 12	CAN; 18^{†}	EUR; 14	GBR; 15	GER; 13	HUN; 7	BEL; 11	ITA; 8	SIN; 6	JPN; 12						13th	27
2011	Sahara Force India F1 Team	Force India VJM04	Mercedes FO 108Y 2.4 V8																KOR; 10	IND; 13	ABU; 9	BRA; 8		13th	27
2012	Sahara Force India F1 Team	Force India VJM05	Mercedes FO 108Z 2.4 V8	AUS; 10	MAL; 7	CHN; 12	BHR; 6	ESP; 14	MON; 7	CAN; 11	EUR; 7	GBR; Ret	GER; 11	HUN; 12	BEL; 10	ITA; 8	SIN; 4	JPN; 12	KOR; 12	IND; 12	ABU; 9	USA; 15	BRA; 19^{†}	14th	46
2013	Sahara Force India F1 Team	Force India VJM06	Mercedes FO 108F 2.4 V8	AUS; 8	MAL; Ret	CHN; 8	BHR; 4	ESP; 7	MON; 9	CAN; 7	GBR; 9	GER; 11	HUN; 18^{†}	BEL; Ret	ITA; Ret	SIN; 20^{†}	KOR; Ret	JPN; 11	IND; 8	ABU; 6	USA; 15	BRA; 11		12th	48
2017	Williams Martini Racing	Williams FW40	Mercedes M08 EQ Power+ 1.6 V6 t	AUS	CHN	BHR	RUS	ESP	MON	CAN	AZE	AUT	GBR	HUN; Ret	BEL	ITA	SIN	MAL	JPN	USA	MEX	BRA	ABU	NC	0

^{†} Driver failed to finish the race, but was classified as he had completed more than 90% of the race distance.

=== Complete IMSA SportsCar Championship results ===
Year	Entrant	Class	Chassis	Engine	1	2	3	4	5	6	7	8	9	10	Rank	Points
2018	United Autosports	P	Ligier JS P217	Gibson GK428 4.2 L V8	DAY; 4	SEB; 5	LBH	MDO	DET	WGL; 4	MOS	ELK	LGA	PET	27th	82
2024	United Autosports USA	LMP2	Oreca 07	Gibson GK428 4.2 L V8	DAY; 11	SEB; 3	WGL; 5	MOS	ELK; 11	IMS; 7	PET; 9				15th	1592
2025	United Autosports USA	LMP2	Oreca 07	Gibson GK428 4.2 L V8	**DAY**; 1	SEB; 8	WGL; 1	MOS	ELK; 14	IMS; 4	PET; 11				12th	1765
2026	United Autosports USA	LMP2	Oreca 07	Gibson GK428 4.2 L V8	DAY; 4	SEB; 2	WGL; 5	MOS	**ELK**; 7	IMS; 3	PET; 6				7th	1837

=== Complete European Le Mans Series results ===
(key) (Races in bold indicate pole position; results in italics indicate fastest lap)

Year	Entrant	Class	Chassis	Engine	1	2	3	4	5	6	Rank	Points
2019	United Autosports	LMP2	Ligier JS P217	Gibson GK428 4.2 L V8	LEC; 6	MNZ	CAT	SIL	SPA	ALG	19th	8
2023	United Autosports USA	LMP2 Pro-Am	Oreca 07	Gibson GK428 4.2 L V8	CAT; 11	LEC; 10					22nd	1
2023	United Autosports USA	LMP2	Oreca 07	Gibson GK428 4.2 L V8			ARA; 7†	SPA	ALG	ALG	NC†	0†
2024	United Autosports	LMP2	Oreca 07	Gibson GK428 4.2 L V8	CAT; 9	LEC; 12	IMO; 6	SPA; 10	MUG; 6	ALG; 6	11th	27

^{†} Car was initially a Pro-Am entry, therefore was ineligible for points.

=== Complete Asian Le Mans Series results ===
(key) (Races in bold indicate pole position; results in italics indicate fastest lap)

Year	Entrant	Class	Chassis	Engine	1	2	3	4	5	6	Rank	Points
2018–19	United Autosports	LMP2	Ligier JS P2	Nissan VK45DE 4.5 L V8	SHA; 2	FUJ; 2	BUR; 1	SEP; 2			1st	80
2022	United Autosports	LMP2	Oreca 07	Gibson GK428 4.2 L V8	DUB; 1	DUB; 2	ABU; 1; 1	ABU; 2; 1			NC†	N/A†
2023	United Autosports	LMP2	Oreca 07	Gibson GK428 4.2 L V8	DUB; 1; 5	DUB; 2; 7	ABU; 1; 5	ABU; 2; 5			8th	36
2025–26	United Autosports	LMP2	Oreca 07	Gibson GK428 4.2 L V8	SEP; 1; 7	SEP; 2; 14	DUB; 1 Ret	DUB; 2; 8	ABU; 1; 6	ABU; 2; 5	10th	28

† Not eligible for points.

=== Complete FIA World Endurance Championship results ===
Year	Entrant	Class	Car	Engine	1	2	3	4	5	6	7	8	Rank	Points
2019–20	United Autosports	LMP2	Oreca 07	Gibson GK428 4.2 L V8	SIL; Ret	FUJ	SHA; 3	**BHR**; 1	COA; 1	**SPA**; 1	**LMS**; 1	**BHR**; 4	2nd	175
2021	United Autosports USA	LMP2	Oreca 07	Gibson GK428 4.2 L V8	SPA	ALG; 3	MNZ	LMS	BHR	BHR			16th	23
2022	United Autosports USA	LMP2	Oreca 07	Gibson GK428 4.2 L V8	SEB; 1	SPA	LMS						11th	38
2022	Peugeot TotalEnergies	Hypercar	Peugeot 9X8	Peugeot X6H 2.6 L Turbo V6				MNZ; Ret	FUJ; 4	BHR; Ret			10th	12
2023	Peugeot TotalEnergies	Hypercar	Peugeot 9X8	Peugeot X6H 2.6 L Turbo V6	SEB; 9	ALG; 7	SPA; 8	LMS; 6	MNZ; 3	FUJ; 8	BHR; 9		8th	51
2024	Peugeot TotalEnergies	Hypercar	Peugeot 9X8	Peugeot X6H 2.6 L Turbo V6	QAT; 15	IMO; 15	SPA; 14	LMS; 11	SÃO; 16	COA; Ret	FUJ; 8	BHR; Ret	28th	4
2025	Peugeot TotalEnergies	Hypercar	Peugeot 9X8	Peugeot X6H 2.6 L Turbo V6	QAT; 9	IMO; 9	SPA; 11	LMS; 15	SÃO; 7	COA; 4	FUJ; 2	BHR; 9	12th	44
2026	Peugeot TotalEnergies	Hypercar	Peugeot 9X8	Peugeot X6H 2.6 L Turbo V6	IMO; 16	SPA; 7	LMS; 11	SÃO; 16	COA; 16	FUJ; Ret	CAT; 12	MNZ; 8	21st	10

=== Complete 24 Hours of Le Mans results ===
Year	Team	Co-Drivers	Car	Class	Laps	Pos.	Class Pos.
2018	(United States) United Autosports	(United Kingdom) Phil Hanson (Portugal) Filipe Albuquerque	Ligier JS P217-Gibson	LMP2	288	DNF	DNF
2019	(United States) United Autosports	(United Kingdom) Phil Hanson (Portugal) Filipe Albuquerque	Ligier JS P217-Gibson	LMP2	365	9th	4th
2020	(United States) United Autosports	(United Kingdom) Phil Hanson (Portugal) Filipe Albuquerque	Oreca 07-Gibson	LMP2	370	5th	**1st**
2021	(United Kingdom) United Autosports	(United Kingdom) Alex Lynn (United Kingdom) Wayne Boyd	Oreca 07-Gibson	LMP2	361	9th	4th
2023	(France) Peugeot TotalEnergies	(Denmark) Mikkel Jensen (France) Jean-Éric Vergne	Peugeot 9X8	Hypercar	330	8th	8th
2024	(France) Peugeot TotalEnergies	(France) Loïc Duval (Belgium) Stoffel Vandoorne	Peugeot 9X8	Hypercar	309	11th	11th
2025	(France) Peugeot TotalEnergies	(Denmark) Mikkel Jensen (France) Jean-Éric Vergne	Peugeot 9X8	Hypercar	379	16th	16th
2026	(France) Peugeot TotalEnergies	(New Zealand) Nick Cassidy (Belgium) Stoffel Vandoorne	Peugeot 9X8	Hypercar	376	12th	12th

== Notes ==
Sporting positions
Preceded by Lewis Hamilton	Formula 3 Euro Series; Champion; 2006	Succeeded by Romain Grosjean
Preceded by Lewis Hamilton	Masters of Formula 3 Winner; 2006	Succeeded by Nico Hülkenberg
Preceded by Timo Scheider	Deutsche Tourenwagen Masters; Champion; 2010	Succeeded by Martin Tomczyk
Preceded by Harrison Newey; Stéphane Richelmi; Thomas Laurent	Asian Le Mans Series; LMP2 Champion; 2018–19; With: Phil Hanson	Succeeded by James French; Roman Rusinov; Leonard Hoogenboom
Awards
Preceded by Alex Lloyd	McLaren Autosport BRDC Award; 2004	Succeeded by Oliver Jarvis
Preceded by Kamui Kobayashi	Autosport Awards; Rookie of the Year; 2011	Succeeded by Mathéo Tuscher
