= 2012 Chinese Grand Prix =

Formula One motor race held in 2012

Race 3 of 20 in the 2012 Formula One World Championship
← Previous race	Next race →

Race details
- Date: 15 April 2012
- Official name: 2012 Formula 1 UBS Chinese Grand Prix
- Location: Shanghai International Circuit; Shanghai, People's Republic of China
- Course: Permanent racing facility
- Course length: 5.451 km (3.387 miles)
- Distance: 56 laps, 305.066 km (189.559 miles)
- Weather: Overcast but Dry Air Temp 22 °C (72 °F) Track Temp 23 °C (73 °F)

Pole position
Driver	(Germany) Nico Rosberg	Mercedes
- Time: 1:35.121

Fastest lap
Driver	(Japan) Kamui Kobayashi	Sauber-Ferrari
- Time: 1:39.960 on lap 40

Podium
First	(Germany) Nico Rosberg	Mercedes
Second	(United Kingdom) Jenson Button	McLaren-Mercedes
Third	(United Kingdom) Lewis Hamilton	McLaren-Mercedes

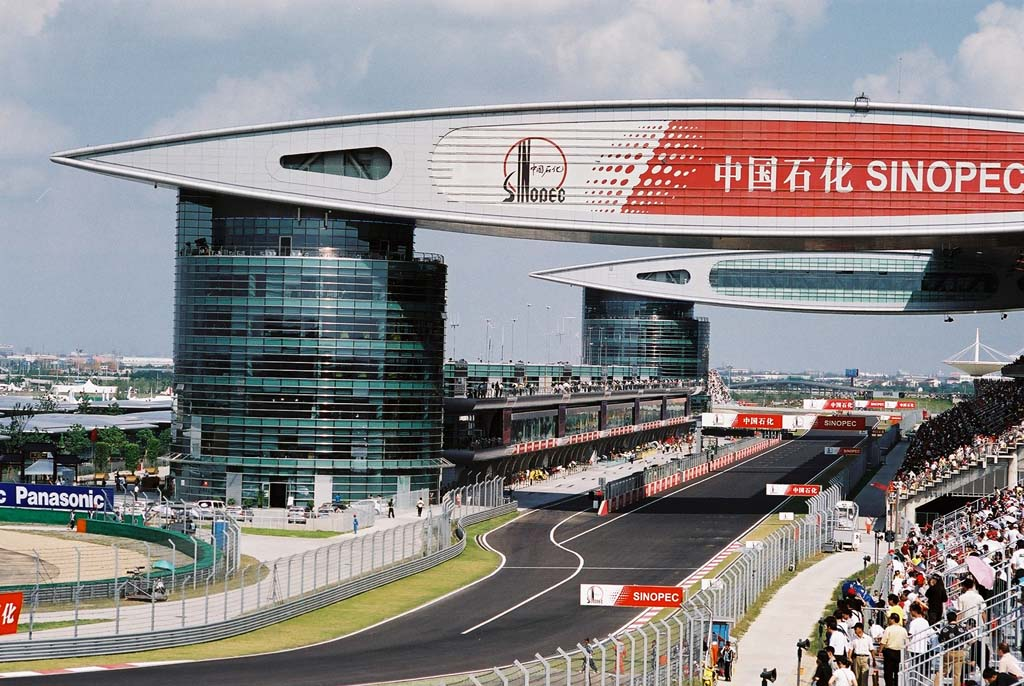
Shanghai International Circuit

The 2012 Chinese Grand Prix (formally the 2012 Formula 1 UBS Chinese Grand Prix) was a Formula One motor race held on 15 April 2012 at the Shanghai International Circuit in Shanghai, China. It was the ninth running of the Chinese Grand Prix as a round of the Formula One World Championship. The 56-lap race was the third round of the 2012 Formula One season.

The race was won by German driver Nico Rosberg driving a Mercedes, after he dominated the race to claim his debut Formula One victory and his first race win since leaving GP2 Series six years prior. Rosberg became the first German driver to win a Grand Prix driving a German car in Formula 1 history. The win was also the first win for an official Mercedes-Benz team since the 1955 Italian Grand Prix, after which Mercedes departed from Formula One for 55 seasons. Rosberg led home the McLaren pair of Jenson Button and Lewis Hamilton by over twenty seconds. The race itself was characterised by intense battling throughout the field and by high reliability with 23 of 24 starters finishing the race. This race was also HRT's thirty-ninth race start, setting the record for most Grand Prix starts without scoring a single point. This was the first race since the 2009 Italian Grand Prix that was not won by either Red Bull, McLaren or Ferrari.

Hamilton consequently took the lead in the Drivers' Championship with 45 points, two more than his teammate Button as Alonso dropped to third following his ninth-place-finish, sitting on 37 points, eight behind Hamilton. As far as the Constructors' Championship was concerned, McLaren extended their lead to 24 points over reigning double champion Red Bull. Following Rosberg's win, Mercedes was promoted to fifth in the standings with 28 points, nine behind fourth-placed Sauber.

== Report ==
=== Background ===
After extended debate over the legality of the Mercedes F1 W03's "front wing F-duct" design in Australia and Malaysia, that ended with the FIA declaring the design to be legal, Red Bull Racing team principal Christian Horner stated that his team was still seeking clarification on the matter, which he expected to be resolved in Shanghai, despite having previously sought a "final ruling" in Malaysia. On the Thursday before the race, Lotus F1 filed a formal protest against the front wing design, citing Article 3.15 of the technical regulations as the grounds for their challenge. The stewards later unanimously rejected the protest and Lotus has since confirmed that they will not appeal against decision.

On the Thursday before the race, McLaren driver Lewis Hamilton was given a five-place grid penalty after the team was forced to change his car's gearbox for the race.

The FIA confirmed that the Drag Reduction System (DRS) zone will be unchanged from 2011, with the detection point located at Turn 12 and the activation point positioned along the back straight.

Like the Australian Grand Prix, tyre supplier Pirelli brought its white-banded medium compound tyre as the harder "prime" tyre and the yellow-banded soft compound tyre as the softer "option" tyre, whereas in 2011, the "prime" compound was the silver-banded hard compound tyre.

=== Qualifying ===
Qualifying for the third race of the season began at 2 pm local time under cloudy and overcast conditions with an ambient temperature of 21 °C (70 °F) and a track temperature of 26 °C (79 °F) (significantly cooler than the previous Malaysia qualifying session). Prior to the start of Q1, Ferrari spoke with Sky Sports commentator Ted Kravitz and said "they need a miracle to get into Q3 today", highlighting just how far the team thought they were from the front runners.

==== Q1 ====
The first session begun with Force India driver Paul di Resta posting the first timed lap of the session. Other drivers followed soon after; all on the harder medium 'prime' tyre. The difference between the medium and the soft compounds was predicted around 0.8 seconds per lap. Leaving their run late, eight minutes into the session both the Red Bull and Mercedes cars had yet to post timed laps. Sebastian Vettel's engineer was heard saying that the lap time he did of 1:36.9 would be good enough to make Q2, subsequently it was the 15th best time of the session. With Felipe Massa in 16th after his run on the prime tyre, he was among the first to switch to the grippier soft compound 'option' tyre. His teammate Fernando Alonso followed suit soon after. Surprisingly Jenson Button undertook a lap on the soft tyres during Q1 even though looking like comfortably progressing to Q2. At the end of the session, Jean-Éric Vergne, for the second consecutive race, failed to make Q2 and was 18th ahead of the usual eliminated cars. In fact, all the eliminated cars in Q1 were in identical positions from the Malaysian Q1 qualifying session. Caterham's Heikki Kovalainen led teammate Vitaly Petrov and Timo Glock led the Marussias, while at the rear were the HRTs of Pedro de la Rosa and Narain Karthikeyan.

==== Q2 ====
For the second session, the two Saubers and Kimi Räikkönen were first to set timed laps. Romain Grosjean was late to post a lap as he made a mistake on his first attempt and pitted for a new set of option tyres. Vettel, in 6th midway through the session, was told on the radio that his current time would probably not make it into Q3. With less than 2 minutes remaining only the Mercedes (P1 and P2), Lewis Hamilton (P3) and Räikkönen (P4) remained in the pits, while everyone else scrambled to get into the top 10 for Q3. Vettel was in 7th as the chequered flag fell, however, many cars were still on flying 'hot laps'. Sergio Pérez jumped into Q3 as did Grosjean from P17 (only needing one timed lap). In a huge shock, Vettel who was on pole for the last three consecutive Chinese Grands Prix failed to make Q3. On his final lap, he only improved his time by 0.003 of a second. It was the first time since the 2009 Brazilian Grand Prix (where he qualified 16th) that Vettel failed to make the top 10 (and hence the final Q3 session). This brought his streak of 41 consecutive qualifying sessions to make the top 10 to an end. Following Vettel in 11th was Massa in 12th (the same as Malaysia) and the two Williams cars of Pastor Maldonado and Bruno Senna who were within 0.006 seconds of each other. In 15th and 16th were the two Force India cars led by di Resta, while Australian Daniel Ricciardo was last in the session in a clearly uncompetitive Toro Rosso.

==== Q3 ====
For the final session, the track was cooling down and German Nico Rosberg was told to think about that in his warm up lap. He was the first to set a timed lap early on with six minutes remaining in the session. The top speed of his car down the long back straight was only 314 km/h as he hit the 7th gear rev-limiter meaning that Mercedes cars didn't have the highest top speed but rather made up time through a better acceleration through the f-duct system as he was one of the quickest past the start/finish line speed trap. Rosberg posted a 1:35.121 which was by far the fastest time of the weekend so far. Teammate Michael Schumacher was half a second slower than Rosberg, as was Hamilton, further highlighting how good Rosberg's lap was. Schumacher on his radio was told Rosberg's lap time and in reply said "not bad". After seeing Webber more than a second off his fastest lap time, Rosberg got out of his car with just under two minutes still left in the session. After confidently leaving his Mercedes, Rosberg watched everyone else fall short of his time and claimed his first pole position of his 111-race career. Following him was Hamilton half a second off (who lined up 7th on the grid after a gearbox change incurred a 5 place grid penalty) and teammate Schumacher in 3rd. Kamui Kobayashi qualified 4th fastest in his best ever qualifying result of his Formula One career to date. His previous best qualifying result was 7th in his home race at the 2011 Japanese Grand Prix. Räikkönen, like in Malaysia, posted the 5th quickest time while Button was more than a second from Rosberg's time in 6th. Webber, in the Red Bull, was 7th while Pérez, in the second Sauber, was an impressive 8th with - like his teammate - his best ever qualifying result in his Formula One career to date. His previous best was a 9th in the 2011 Belgian Grand Prix. Alonso, like Räikkönen, was in the same position as the Malaysia qualifying session and lined up on the grid in 9th, while Grojean in the second Lotus didn't complete a timed lap and hence was 10th. In another milestone, it was the first time that both Saubers had qualified in the top 10 since the 2009 season when team were known as BMW Sauber.

After qualifying, Jean-Éric Vergne made changes to his car before the race, leading to him starting the race in pit lane.

=== Race ===
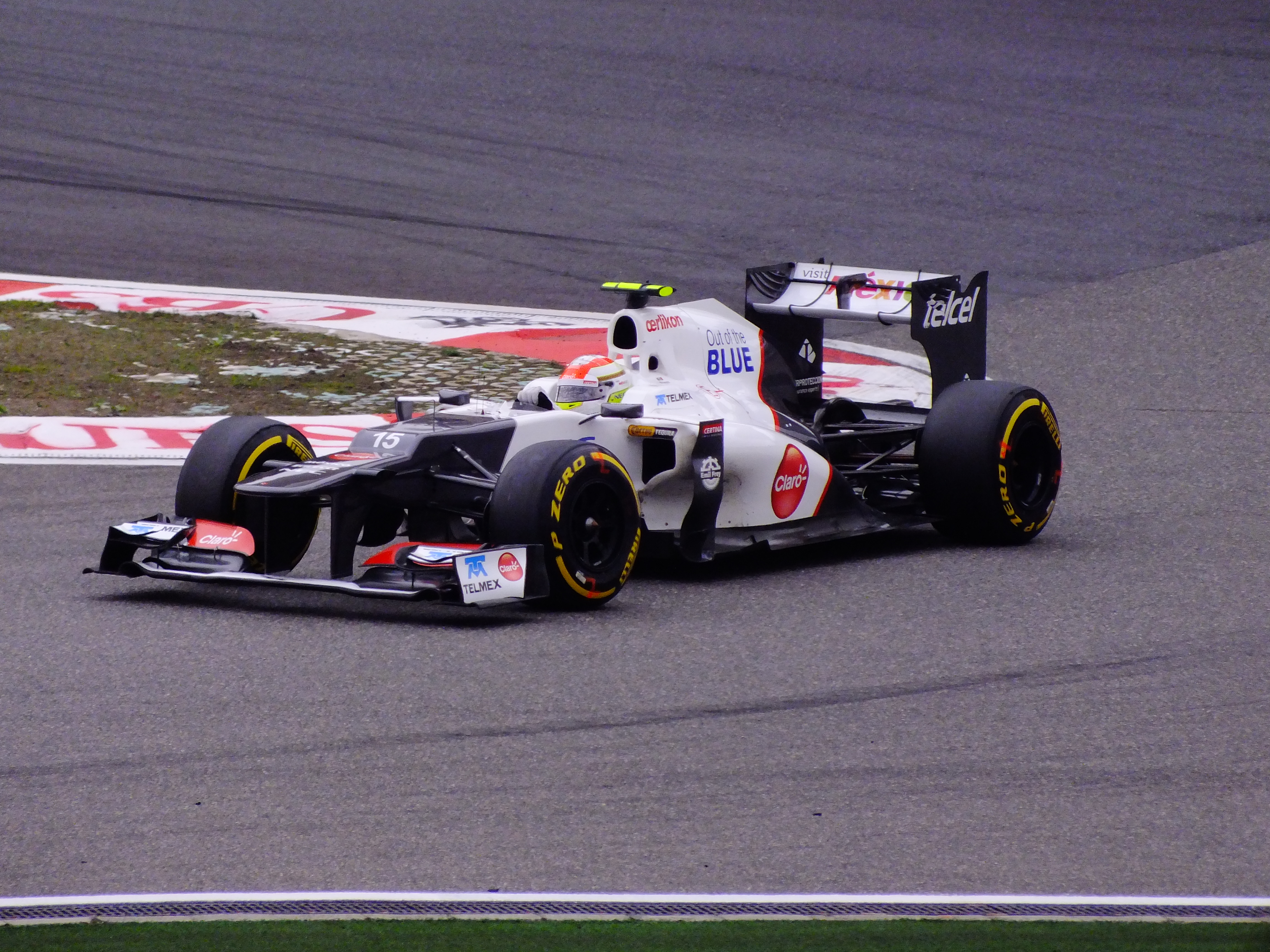
Sergio Pérez

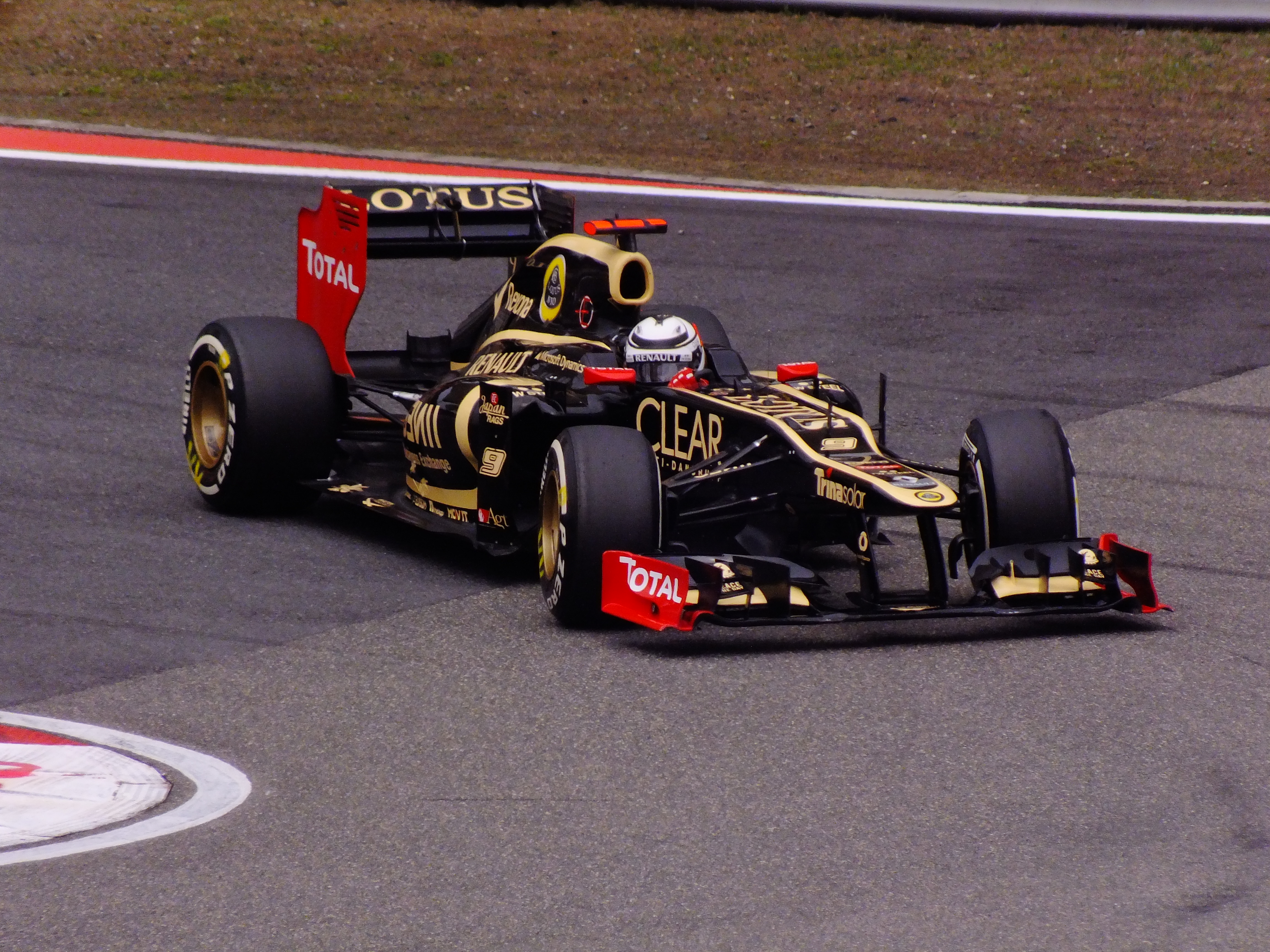
Kimi Räikkönen

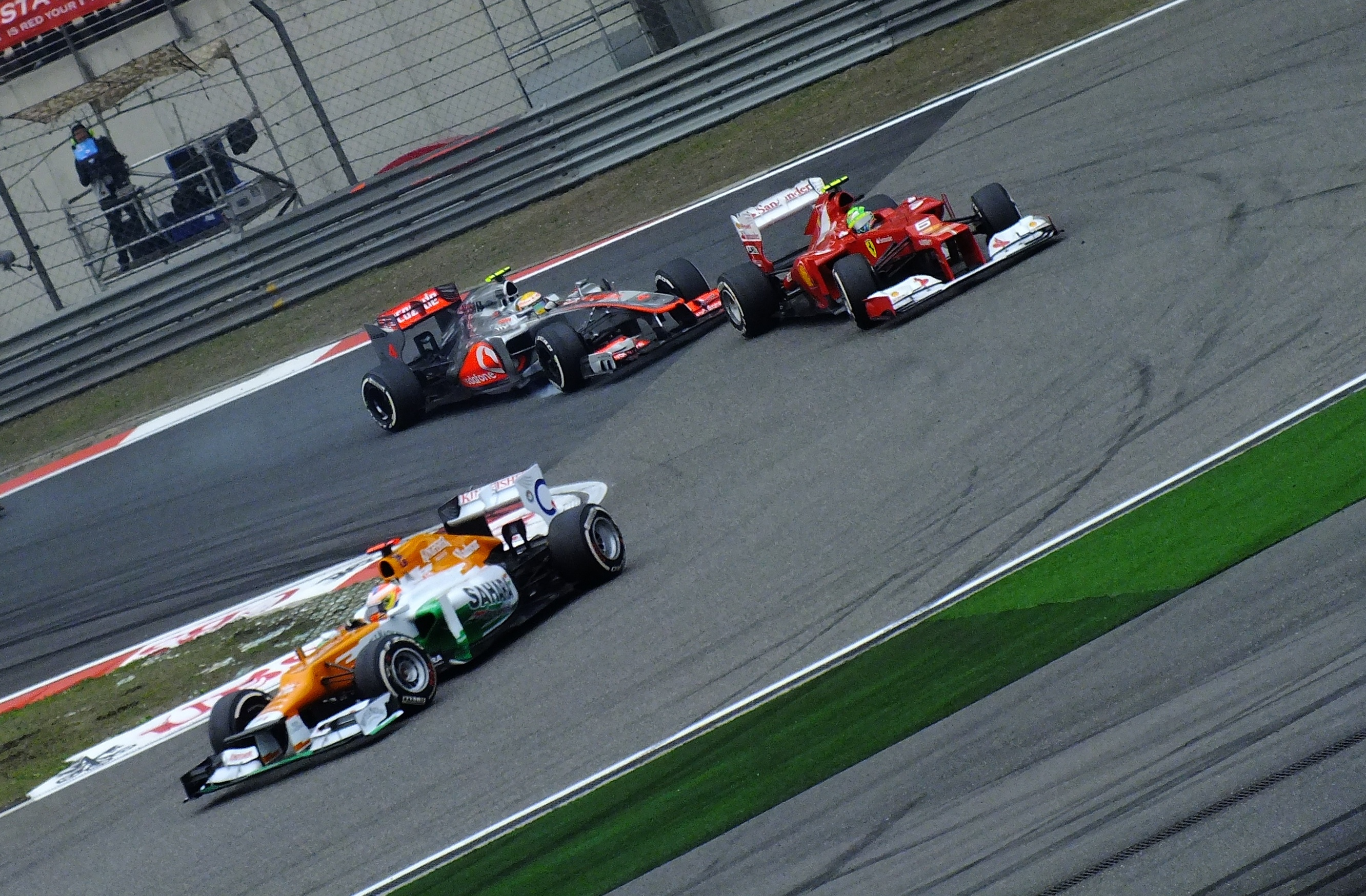
Nico Hülkenberg leading Massa and Hamilton

In contrast to the previous Malaysian Grand Prix, the race began under mild cloudy conditions with an ambient temperature of 22 °C (72 °F) and a track temperature of 24 °C (75 °F). Massa, Senna, and the two Toro Rossos started on the medium tyre while everybody else had the soft yellow banded tyre fitted for the start. The Rosberg-led Mercedes cars led as they lined up on the grid into turn 1 with relative ease, while behind them Kobayashi starting in P3 was down to 6th by the fourth corner. Button started well and took sixth ahead of Räikkönen in an almost incident-free first lap. Only minor contact was made at the first turn as Bruno Senna ran into the back of Massa's Ferrari slightly damaging his front wing in the process. Mark Webber and Fernando Alonso yet again raced side by side and passed each other three times throughout the first lap - Webber, making a poor start, was scrapping for 9th behind Alonso by lap 5. By the time the DRS was enabled (lap 3) the two leading Mercedes were more than one second ahead of their rivals and therefore out of range from DRS attack from cars behind. By lap 6, Vettel was struggling with straight line speed in 14th position and was 19th fastest through the speed trap, complaining to his engineer via radio. On lap 7, Webber made a strategic early pit stop to change to medium tyres and immediately set a fastest lap time. This prompted a flurry of pit stops by the other drivers. Hamilton and Räikkönen pitted and came out side by side. However, Hamilton had his nose in front, allowing him to rejoin ahead of Räikkönen. Mark Webber slotted in between in Hamilton and Räikkönen, leaving Räikkönen the loser during the pit stop phase.

Michael Schumacher was forced to retire after a miscommunication resulted in him leaving the pit lane before his right front wheel was properly fitted. The wheel-gun man knew he made an error and immediately tried to call Schumacher back, but it was too late. He was subsequently the only retirement of the race, leaving Mercedes to ponder what could have been at least a podium finish. On lap 14, pole sitter and leader Rosberg pitted for mediums tyres leaving an unpitted Pérez in the lead.

Following the pit stops, Nico Rosberg once again emerged as the leader, followed by Jenson Button, Lewis Hamilton, Mark Webber, and Kimi Räikkönen. Lap 21 saw everyone in their adjusted positions after everyone had completed one pit stop. On lap 22, Webber stopped for fresh medium tyres, and set a new fastest lap upon emerging. Button and Hamilton followed suit soon after. Räikkönen pitted from 2nd on lap 29, dropping him down to 13th. At this stage of the race, Jenson Button had great pace and was quickly catching the cars ahead who had only stopped once (Pérez, Vettel, Grosjean, and the leading Rosberg). On lap 30, Rob Smedley was heard telling Felipe Massa, "Fernando on a different strategy", essentially telling him to let his teammate through for 10th place at the time. Soon after Alonso moved ahead of di Resta, justifying Ferrari's radio call to Massa. At this stage it was clear that Rosberg, Vettel, and Räikkönen were on two-stop strategies while Button, Hamilton and Webber were on track for three stops. Pérez was third on lap 35, but under huge pressure from Lewis Hamilton and was locking up his front tyres heavily while defending into the hairpin, turn 14.

Rosberg, having continued running on his hard tyres for 21 laps, finally decided to pit on lap 34 for his second and final stop - meaning he would need 22 laps from this set of medium tyres. This allowed Button to take the lead, followed by Rosberg and Hamilton, who was closely pressed by Alonso for third. At this stage of the race, a 'train' of cars started to form (seen clearly down the back straight). From Massa in 5th, who had only stopped once, the next three cars all had their DRS open, meaning they were all within one second of each other and it appeared Massa was fast enough not to be overtaken, but slow enough to keep everyone bunched up behind him. Replays were shown of Mark Webber, prior to the long DRS back straight, going wide and hitting a bump to ascend both his front tyres off the ground by half a metre. Luckily, he handed the car without damaging the suspension of front wing allowing him to only lose a second of lap time.

The train continued to grow by lap 38 as Grosjean in 10th joined Massa, Räikkönen, Kobayshi, and Vettel in the battle for 5th. Jenson Button asked his engineer "what time is Rosberg doing?", to which his engineer replied "Rosberg is seven-tenths slower than us". However, this was before Rosberg pitted for new tyres, and now Rosberg was six-tenths a lap up on Button.

Lap 38 saw Hamilton pit from 3rd, closely followed in by Alonso, dropping them to 10th and 11th respectively. Button's final pit stop while 7 seconds ahead, on lap 39, was delayed due to an error on the left rear wheel and allowed Rosberg back into the lead. Following Button's pit stop, Rosberg now led Massa by 19.1 seconds in clear command and within sight of victory as highlighted by his engineer saying "most important thing is your looking after the tyres". Finally Massa pitted from second place, but he now released a Räikkönen-led train of cars. On lap 43, eleven cars could be seen from one end to the other of the long back DRS straight. Alonso went wide on turn 7 onto the discarded tyre marbles while trying to overtake Maldonado and nearly collected the Sauber of Sergio Pérez on the way back onto track. Grosjean who was a part of the train went wide in turn 7 (like Alonso) and lost grip on tyre marbles while trying to overtake Vettel, consequently losing some positions. By lap 49 Räikkönen's tyres appeared to hit the 'cliff' and lose effective tyre performance. In the space of 2 laps Räikkönen went from 2nd to 12th.

The 'train', which was started by Massa and continued by Räikkönen, led to 2nd to 14th positions being separated by just 15 seconds (rare to see so late in a race without a safety car). With 5 laps remaining, Rosberg had a 20+ second lead while Vettel, in 2nd, finally succumbed to the 3-stopped Button. Vettel, who had gone with a two-stop strategy, was now struggling like Räikkönen a few laps earlier. Hamilton and Webber were right on his rear wing now and it was only a matter of time before he dropped back. On lap 54, Hamilton took 3rd position from Vettel at the hairpin and a lap later, Mark Webber did the same for 4th.

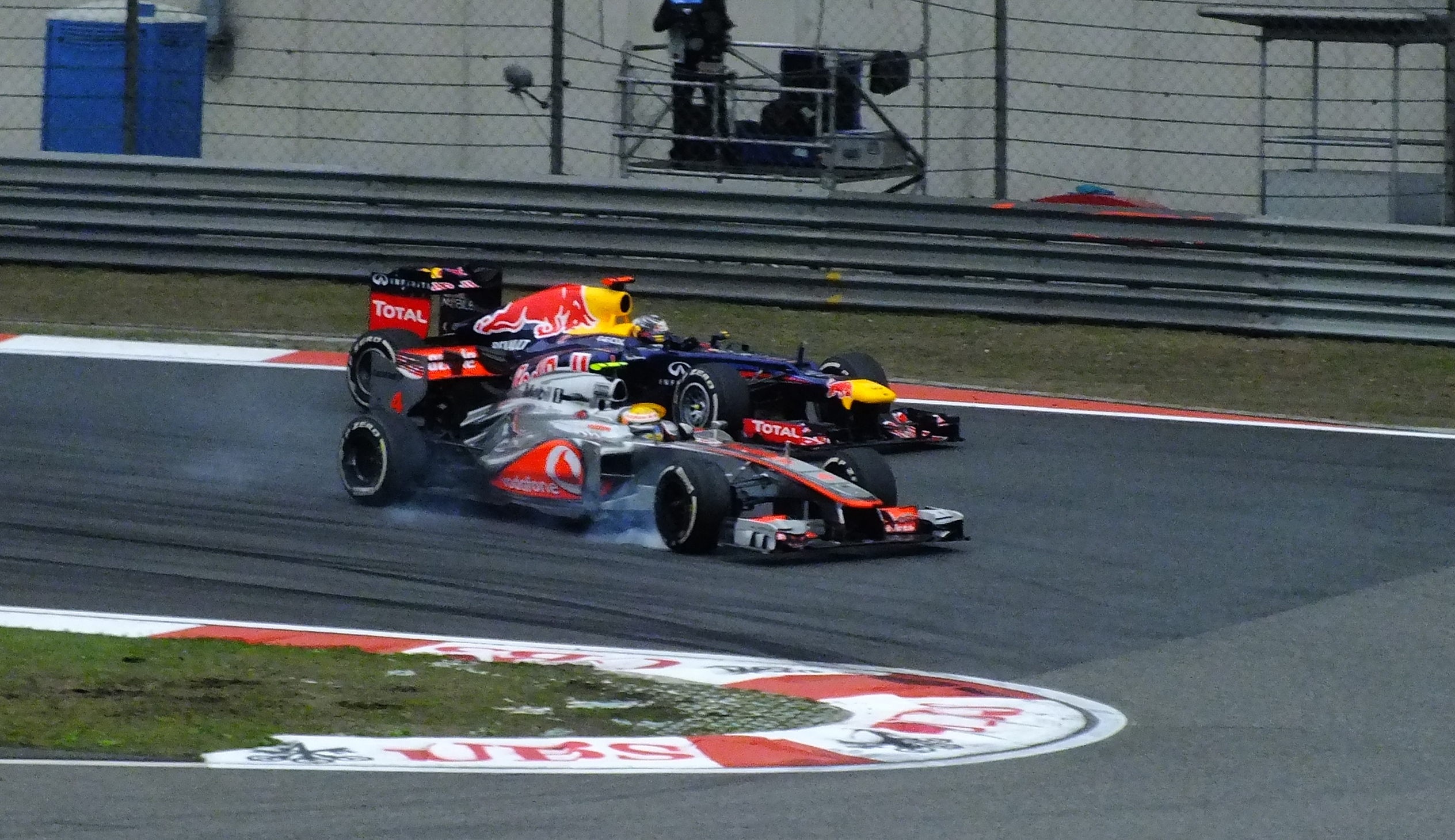
Lewis Hamilton fighting Sebastian Vettel for position

On crossing the chequered flag, Nico Rosberg won his first ever Formula One grand prix from 111 races. He was the 103rd different winner of a Formula One grand prix since 1950, and the 12th different Mercedes powered winner in Formula One. Button finished 20 seconds adrift in 2nd after a pit stop error robbed what little chance he may have had at taking victory (although unlikely given Rosberg's pace and the difficulty seen when overtaking on this track). Locking out an all Mercedes-powered podium was Hamilton, followed by Red Bull's Mark Webber in 4th. Both Hamilton and Webber have now finished 3rd and 4th respectively for all of the three grands prix this season. Webber's Red Bull teammate, Sebastian Vettel, finished 5th on worn tyres and Romain Grosjean finished 6th in his best ever result in a Formula One race. The Williams cars showed good race pace and earned solid points with Senna in 7th and Maldonado in 8th. Ferrari continued their struggle in dry conditions, with Alonso finishing 9th and teammate Massa in 13th. Kamui Kobayashi took the final point in 10th ahead of teammate Pérez in a disappointing grand prix for the Sauber team after having such a great qualifying performance. Of note was 2007 world champion Kimi Räikkönen who finished a disappointing 14th after his tyres were too worn. Also, of note was that 17 drivers completed the race on the lead lap, with Daniel Ricciardo in 17th just over one minute behind the leader in a highly uncompetitive Toro Rosso (teammate Vergne was 16th). This race was the first win for the Brackley-based Mercedes GP team since the 2009 Italian Grand Prix when Rubens Barrichello won when the team was known as Brawn GP.

== Support events ==
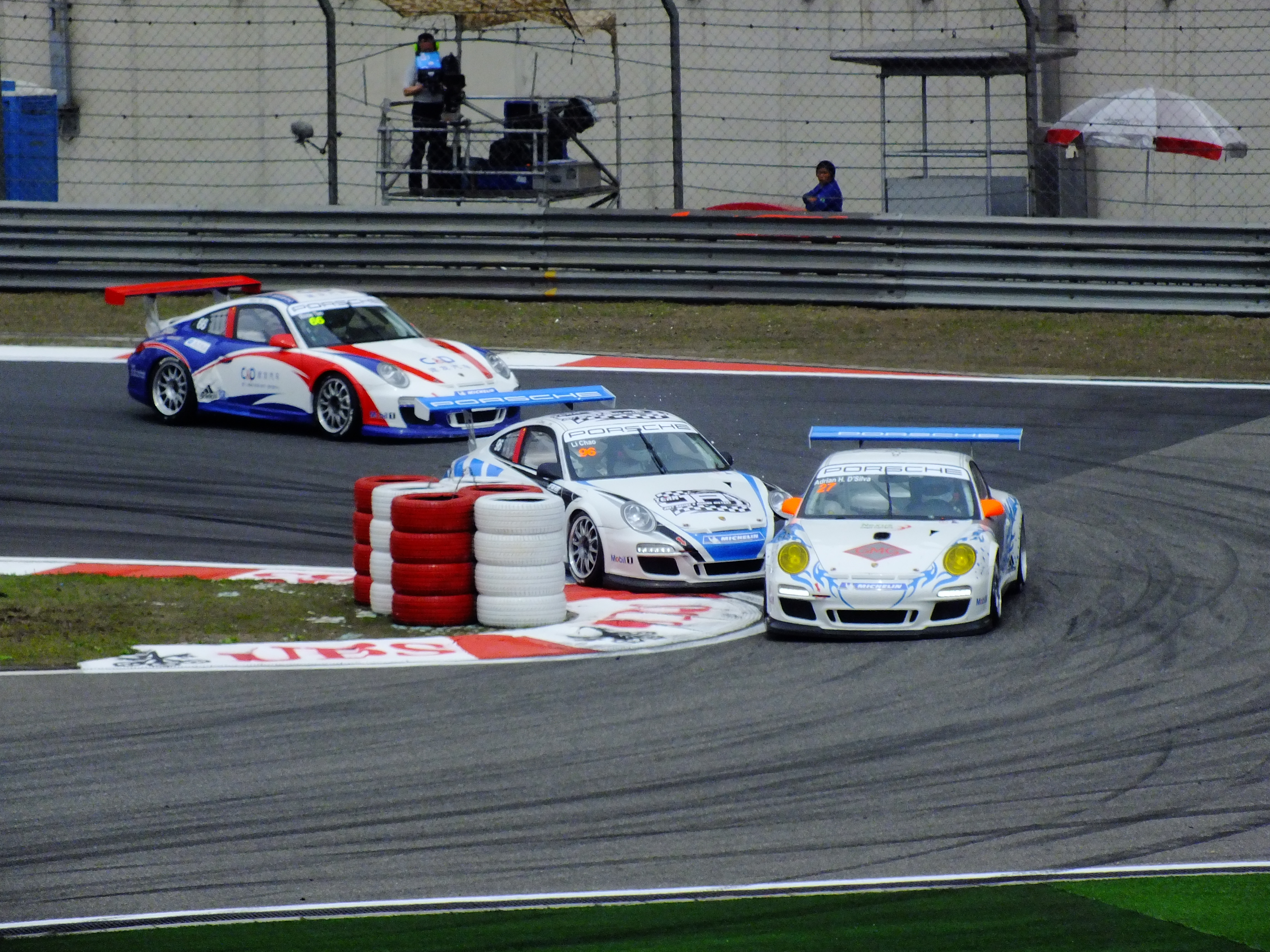
The Porsche Carrera Cup Asia supported the Chinese Grand Prix

The event took place between 12 and 15 April where throughout the weekend there were support events. Taking part in the Chinese Grand Prix program was the Porsche Carrera Cup Asia with 2 races.

== Classification ==
=== Qualifying ===
Pos.	No.	Driver	Constructor	Part 1	Part 2	Part 3	Grid
1	8	(Germany) Nico Rosberg	Mercedes	1:36.875	1:35.725	1:35.121	1
2	4	(United Kingdom) Lewis Hamilton	McLaren-Mercedes	1:36.763	1:35.902	1:35.626	7^{1}
3	7	(Germany) Michael Schumacher	Mercedes	1:36.797	1:35.794	1:35.691	2
4	14	(Japan) Kamui Kobayashi	Sauber-Ferrari	1:36.863	1:35.853	1:35.784	3
5	9	(Finland) Kimi Räikkönen	Lotus-Renault	1:36.850	1:35.921	1:35.898	4
6	3	(United Kingdom) Jenson Button	McLaren-Mercedes	1:36.746	1:35.942	1:36.191	5
7	2	(Australia) Mark Webber	Red Bull-Renault	1:36.682	1:35.700	1:36.290	6
8	15	(Mexico) Sergio Pérez	Sauber-Ferrari	1:36.198	1:35.831	1:36.524	8
9	5	(Spain) Fernando Alonso	Ferrari	1:36.292	1:35.982	1:36.622	9
10	10	(France) Romain Grosjean	Lotus-Renault	1:36.343	1:35.903	no time	10
11	1	(Germany) Sebastian Vettel	Red Bull-Renault	1:36.911	1:36.031		11
12	6	(Brazil) Felipe Massa	Ferrari	1:36.556	1:36.255		12
13	18	(Venezuela) Pastor Maldonado	Williams-Renault	1:36.528	1:36.283		13
14	19	(Brazil) Bruno Senna	Williams-Renault	1:36.674	1:36.289		14
15	11	(United Kingdom) Paul di Resta	Force India-Mercedes	1:36.639	1:36.317		15
16	12	(Germany) Nico Hülkenberg	Force India-Mercedes	1:36.921	1:36.745		16
17	16	(Australia) Daniel Ricciardo	Toro Rosso-Ferrari	1:36.933	1:36.956		17
18	17	(France) Jean-Éric Vergne	Toro Rosso-Ferrari	1:37.714			18
19	20	(Finland) Heikki Kovalainen	Caterham-Renault	1:38.463			19
20	21	(Russia) Vitaly Petrov	Caterham-Renault	1:38.677			20
21	24	(Germany) Timo Glock	Marussia-Cosworth	1:39.282			21
22	25	(France) Charles Pic	Marussia-Cosworth	1:39.717			22
23	22	(Spain) Pedro de la Rosa	HRT-Cosworth	1:40.411			23
24	23	(India) Narain Karthikeyan	HRT-Cosworth	1:41.000			24
107% time: 1:42.931

Notes

- ^1 — Lewis Hamilton was given a five-place grid penalty for a gearbox change prior to the weekend.

=== Race ===
Pos.	No.	Driver	Constructor	Laps	Time/Retired	Grid	Points
1	8	(Germany) Nico Rosberg	Mercedes	56	1:36:26.929	1	25
2	3	(United Kingdom) Jenson Button	McLaren-Mercedes	56	+20.626	5	18
3	4	(United Kingdom) Lewis Hamilton	McLaren-Mercedes	56	+26.012	7	15
4	2	(Australia) Mark Webber	Red Bull-Renault	56	+27.924	6	12
5	1	(Germany) Sebastian Vettel	Red Bull-Renault	56	+30.483	11	10
6	10	(France) Romain Grosjean	Lotus-Renault	56	+31.491	10	8
7	19	(Brazil) Bruno Senna	Williams-Renault	56	+34.597	14	6
8	18	(Venezuela) Pastor Maldonado	Williams-Renault	56	+35.643	13	4
9	5	(Spain) Fernando Alonso	Ferrari	56	+37.256	9	2
10	14	(Japan) Kamui Kobayashi	Sauber-Ferrari	56	+38.720	3	1
11	15	(Mexico) Sergio Pérez	Sauber-Ferrari	56	+41.066	8	
12	11	(United Kingdom) Paul di Resta	Force India-Mercedes	56	+42.273	15	
13	6	(Brazil) Felipe Massa	Ferrari	56	+42.779	12	
14	9	(Finland) Kimi Räikkönen	Lotus-Renault	56	+50.573	4	
15	12	(Germany) Nico Hülkenberg	Force India-Mercedes	56	+51.213	16	
16	17	(France) Jean-Éric Vergne	Toro Rosso-Ferrari	56	+51.756	PL^{1}	
17	16	(Australia) Daniel Ricciardo	Toro Rosso-Ferrari	56	+1:03.156	17	
18	21	(Russia) Vitaly Petrov	Caterham-Renault	55	+1 Lap	19	
19	24	(Germany) Timo Glock	Marussia-Cosworth	55	+1 Lap	20	
20	25	(France) Charles Pic	Marussia-Cosworth	55	+1 Lap	21	
21	22	(Spain) Pedro de la Rosa	HRT-Cosworth	55	+1 Lap	22	
22	23	(India) Narain Karthikeyan	HRT-Cosworth	54	+2 Laps	23	
23	20	(Finland) Heikki Kovalainen	Caterham-Renault	53	+3 Laps	18	
Ret	7	(Germany) Michael Schumacher	Mercedes	12	Wheel	2	

Notes

- ^1 — Jean-Éric Vergne started from pit lane after his team carried out various changes to his car, contravening parc ferme regulations.

== Championship standings after the race ==
Drivers' Championship standings

	Pos.	Driver	Points
1	1	(United Kingdom) Lewis Hamilton	45
1	2	(United Kingdom) Jenson Button	43
2	3	(Spain) Fernando Alonso	37
	4	(Australia) Mark Webber	36
1	5	(Germany) Sebastian Vettel	28

Constructors' Championship standings

	Pos.	Constructor	Points
	1	(United Kingdom) McLaren-Mercedes	88
	2	(Austria) Red Bull-Renault	64
	3	(Italy) Ferrari	37
	4	(Switzerland) Sauber-Ferrari	31
4	5	(Germany) Mercedes	26

- Note: Only the top five positions are included for both sets of standings.

Previous race: 2012 Malaysian Grand Prix	FIA Formula One World Championship; 2012 season	Next race: 2012 Bahrain Grand Prix
Previous race: 2011 Chinese Grand Prix	Chinese Grand Prix	Next race: 2013 Chinese Grand Prix
