= Mercedes F1 W03 =

Formula One racing car

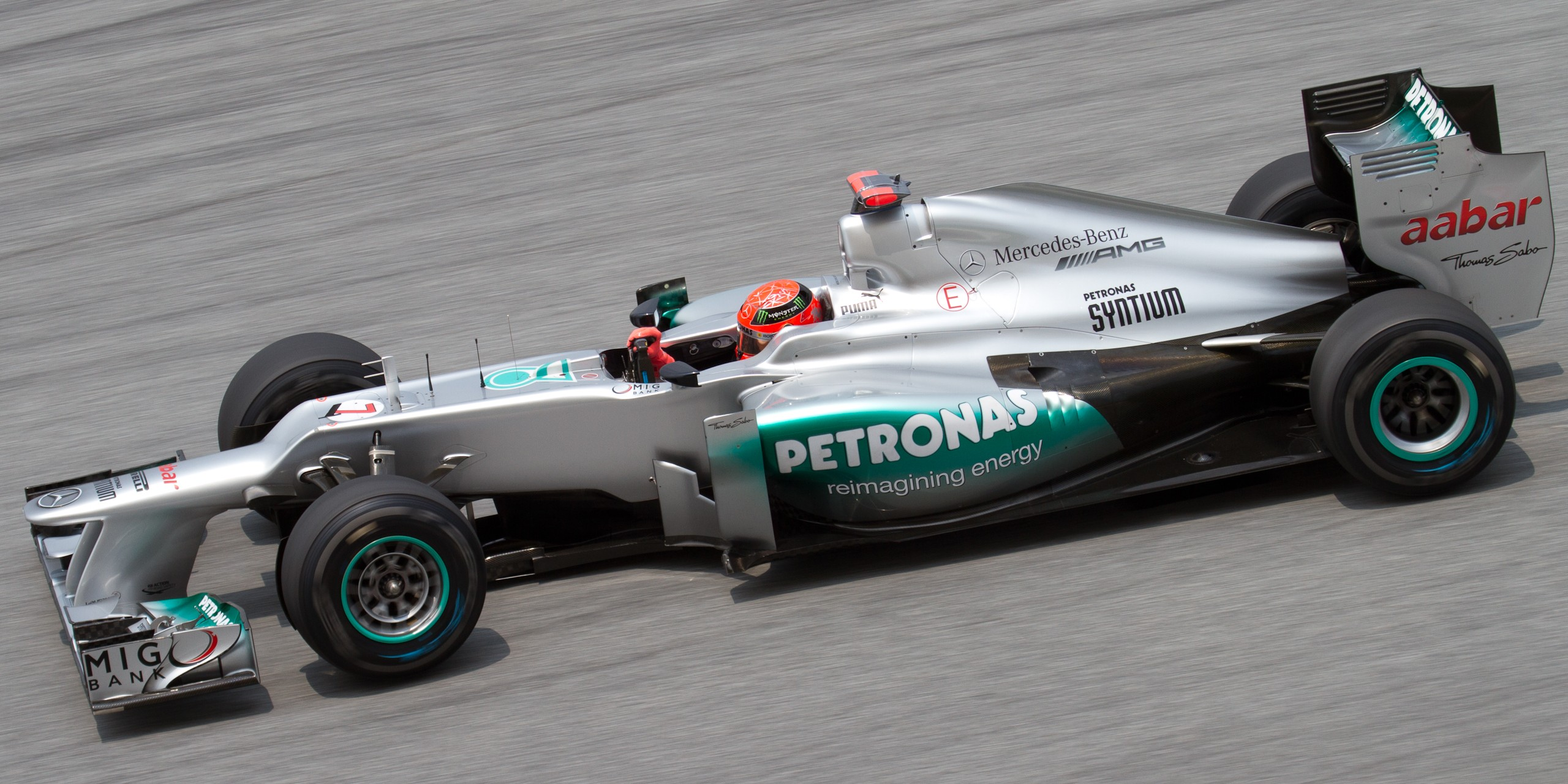
- Michael Schumacher driving the W03 at the Malaysian Grand Prix
- Category: Formula One
- Constructor: Mercedes
- Designers: Bob Bell (Technical Director); John Owen (Chief Designer); Craig Wilson (Head of Vehicle Engineering); Loïc Serra (Chief Vehicle Dynamicist); Russell Cooley (Chief Engineer); Loïc Bigois (Head of Aerodynamics); David Jeffrey (Deputy Head of Aerodynamics); Ben Wood (Chief Aerodynamicist)
- Predecessor: Mercedes MGP W02
- Successor: Mercedes F1 W04

Technical specifications
- Chassis: Moulded carbon-fibre and honeycomb composite monocoque
- Suspension (front): Wishbone and pushrod activated torsion springs and rockers
- Suspension (rear): Wishbone and pullrod
- Length: 4,800 mm (189 in)
- Width: 1,800 mm (71 in)
- Height: 950 mm (37 in)
- Engine: Mercedes-Benz FO 108Z 2.4 L (146 cu in) V8 (90°). Naturally aspirated, 18,000 RPM limited with KERS mid-mounted
- Transmission: Jointly Xtrac 1044 with Mercedes AMG housing seven-speed semi-automatic carbon-fibre sequential gearbox with reverse gear hydraulic activation hand-operated, seamless shift
- Weight: 640 kg (1,411.0 lb)
- Fuel: Petronas Primax
- Lubricants: Petronas Syntium
- Tyres: Pirelli P Zero (dry), Cinturato (wet); BBS Wheels (front and rear): 13"

Competition history
- Notable entrants: Mercedes AMG Petronas F1 Team
- Notable drivers: 7. (Germany) Michael Schumacher; 8. (Germany) Nico Rosberg
- Debut: 2012 Australian Grand Prix
- First win: 2012 Chinese Grand Prix
- Last win: 2012 Chinese Grand Prix
- Last event: 2012 Brazilian Grand Prix
Races	Wins	Podiums	Poles	F/Laps
20	1	3	1	3

The Mercedes F1 W03 (commonly abbreviated as the Mercedes W03) is a Formula One racing car, designed by Mercedes AMG Petronas Formula One Team, for use in the 2012 Formula One season. The car was driven by seven time World Drivers' Champion Michael Schumacher in his final year of his Formula One career and Nico Rosberg. The car was launched on 21 February, ahead of the second test of the winter testing season. The team used the F1 W03's predecessor, the Mercedes MGP W02, at the first test in Jerez de la Frontera — running for three of the four days — in order to evaluate the 2012 specification of Pirelli tyres.

The W03 completed a shakedown at Silverstone on 16 February, and carried out a private test at the Circuit de Catalunya in Barcelona on 19 February; under the sporting regulations, the team was entitled to hold a private test as they had only attended three of the four test days at Jerez. At the 2012 Chinese Grand Prix, Rosberg took Mercedes's first pole position and win since the 1955 Italian Grand Prix. Until 2024, this was the last time the team finished behind one of their customer teams in the Constructors' Championship.

== Design ==
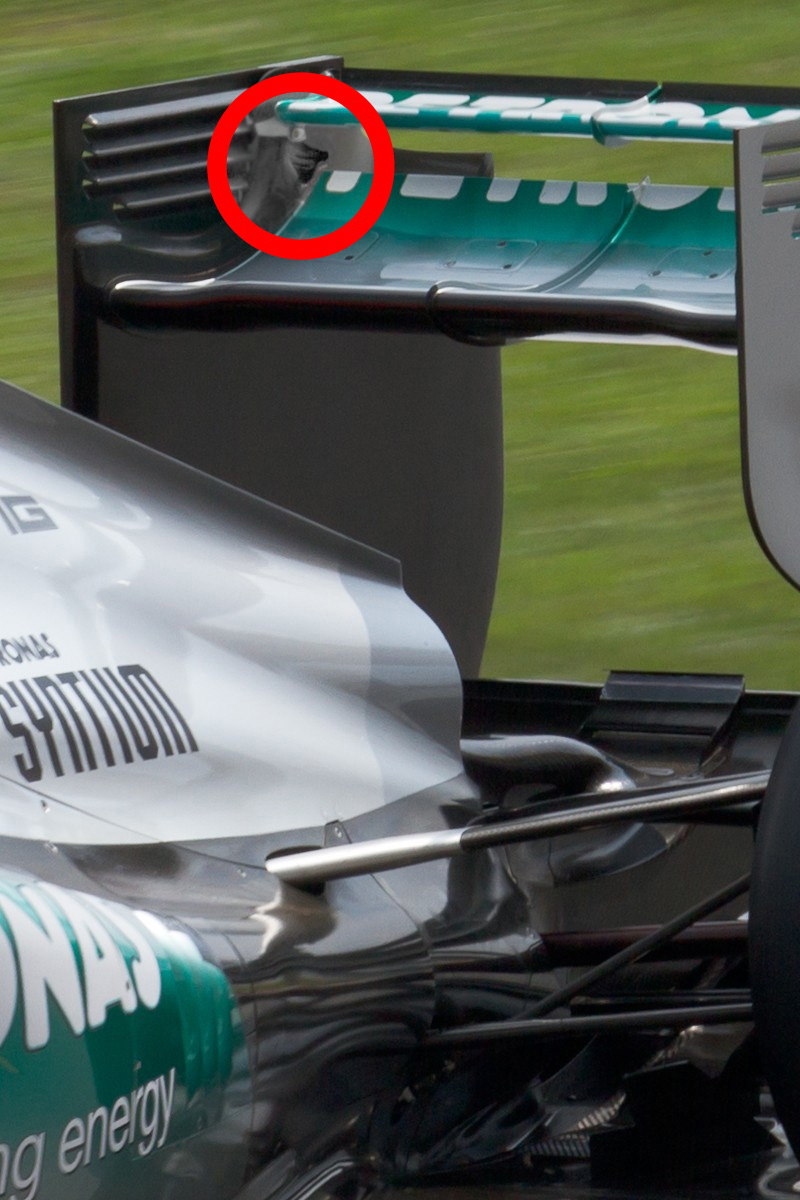
The controversial rear wing of the F1 W03

The F1 W03 was introduced at the first race of the season in Melbourne with what was described as a "radical wing concept". Speculation suggested that the wing used the F-duct concept (developed by McLaren in 2010) by blowing air across the surface of the wing to "stall" it, thereby cancelling out all downforce and drag running over the wing and allowing the car to achieve a higher top speed.

The system developed by Mercedes was reported to create an F-duct effect over the front wing when the drag reduction system (DRS) flap in the rear wing opened. Opening the flap would expose two vents, which channeled air back through the car and over the front wing, cancelling out the downforce generated by the front wing with the intention of increasing stability in high-speed corners.

=== Controversy ===
On the Thursday before the Australian Grand Prix, the FIA's technical delegate Charlie Whiting declared the system to be legal. However, shortly before the final practice session on Saturday afternoon, representatives from Red Bull Racing and Lotus F1 approached the race stewards and requested that the FIA review the original verdict, claiming that the front wing system was in violation of Articles 3.15 and 3.18, which govern the use of DRS and driver-operated aerodynamic devices.

On the Thursday before the Malaysian Grand Prix, the FIA rejected all claims that the system was illegal, allowing Mercedes to compete with an unaltered car. Three weeks later in China, Lotus F1 filed a formal protest against the system, citing Article 3.15 of the technical regulations — which states that "any device that influences the car's aerodynamics must remain immobile in relation to the sprung part of the car" — as the basis for their challenge.

The stewards later unanimously rejected the protest. They stated that "the sole purpose of the DRS as stated in article 3.18.3, is to improve overtaking. The Mercedes design is completely consistent with this objective", and further clarified that "the protest is dismissed on the grounds that the FIA confirmed the assertion of the Mercedes team that it had, in accordance with Article 2.4 and/or 2.5 of the Formula One Technical Regulations, sought clarification from the FIA Formula One Technical Department concerning this matter and the FIA confirmed that the Mercedes design had been deemed permissible", before the start of the season. Lotus later confirmed that they would not appeal against the decision.

== Season summary ==
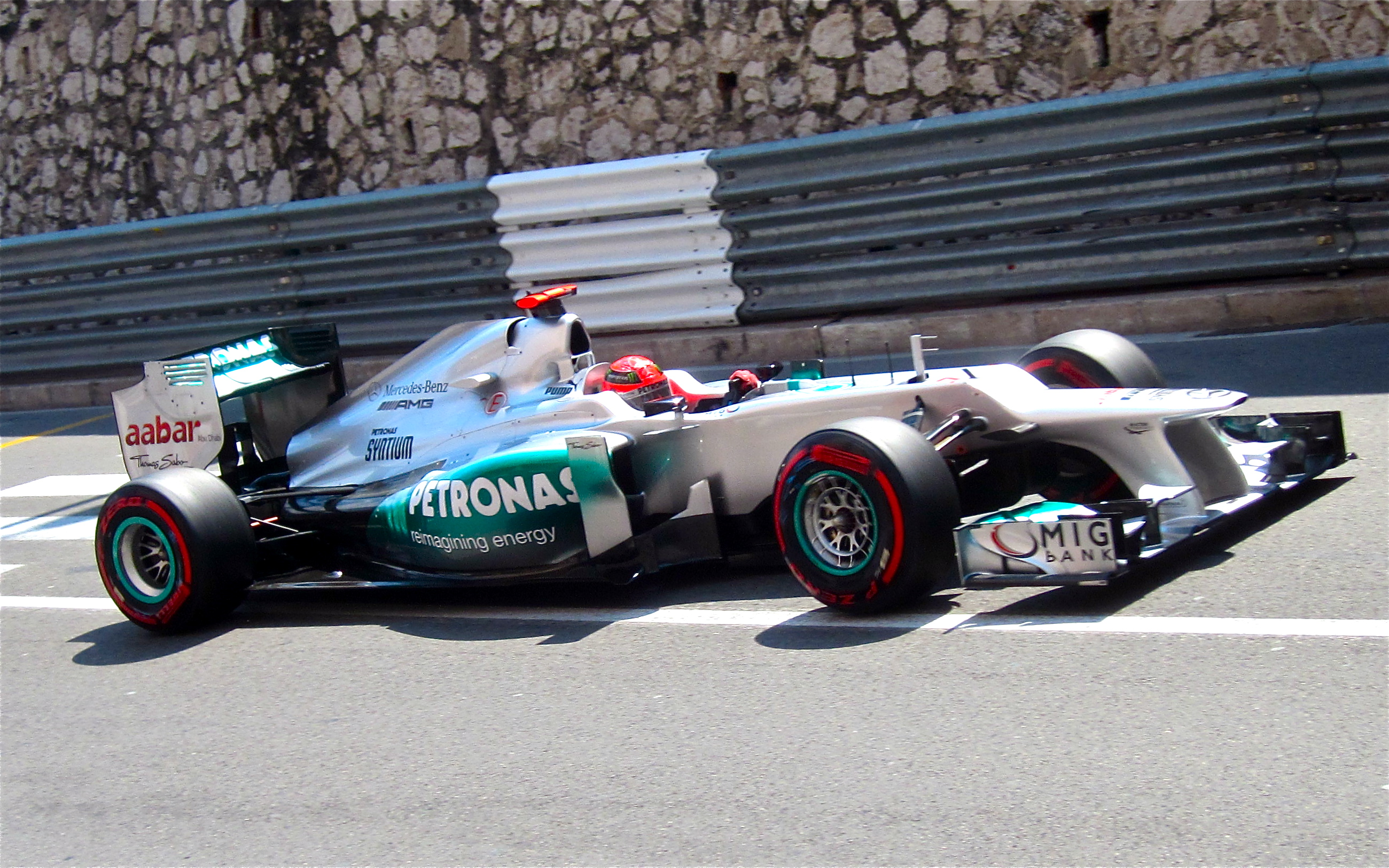
Schumacher at the Monaco Grand Prix

The F1 W03 propelled Mercedes to finish fifth in the World Constructors' Championship with 142 points, 23 points adrift from its predecessor. Regardless, it secured three podium finishes and a single victory. Schumacher achieved his last podium finish of his career at the European Grand Prix.

== Sponsorship and livery ==
The livery remained the same as in previous years: grey, featuring the blue-green colour associated with the main sponsor, Petronas. A new sponsor was the German multinational clothing company Puma. At the Indian Grand Prix, the Airtel logo was placed in the car's air intake. At the Brazilian Grand Prix, both W03s carried a Schumacher's farewell logo, marking his retirement from the sport.

== Other uses ==
At the 2014 Goodwood Festival of Speed, Lewis Hamilton demonstrated the W03 in W05 livery.

== Complete Formula One results ==
(key) (results in bold indicate pole position; results in italics indicate fastest lap)

Year	Entrant	Engine	Tyres	Drivers	1	2	3	4	5	6	7	8	9	10	11	12	13	14	15	16	17	18	19	20	Points	WCC
2012	Mercedes AMG Petronas	Mercedes FO 108Z	**P**		AUS	MAL	CHN	BHR	ESP	MON	CAN	EUR	GBR	GER	HUN	BEL	ITA	SIN	JPN	KOR	IND	ABU	USA	BRA	142	5th
2012	Mercedes AMG Petronas	Mercedes FO 108Z	**P**	(Germany) Michael Schumacher	Ret	10	Ret	10	Ret	Ret	Ret	3	7	7	Ret	7	6	Ret	11	13	22^{†}	11	16	7	142	5th
2012	Mercedes AMG Petronas	Mercedes FO 108Z	**P**	(Germany) Nico Rosberg	12	13	**1**	5	7	2	6	6	15	10	10	11	7	5	Ret	Ret	11	Ret	13	15	142	5th

^{†} Driver failed to finish the race but was classified as they had completed greater than 90% of the race distance.

== See also ==
- Formula One car
