= 2012 Malaysian Grand Prix =

2nd round of the 2012 Formula One season

Race 2 of 20 in the 2012 Formula One World Championship
← Previous race	Next race →

Race details
- Date: 25 March 2012
- Official name: 2012 Formula 1 Petronas Malaysia Grand Prix
- Location: Sepang International Circuit; Sepang, Selangor, Malaysia
- Course: Permanent racing facility
- Course length: 5.543 km (3.444 miles)
- Distance: 56 laps, 310.408 km (192.879 miles)
- Weather: Heavy rain clearing to cloudy and dry Air Temp 26 °C (79 °F) Track Temp 29 °C (84 °F) dropping to 24 °C (75 °F)
- Attendance: 119,960 (Weekend)

Pole position
Driver	(United Kingdom) Lewis Hamilton	McLaren-Mercedes
- Time: 1:36.219

Fastest lap
Driver	(Finland) Kimi Räikkönen	Lotus-Renault
- Time: 1:40.722 on lap 53

Podium
First	(Spain) Fernando Alonso	Ferrari
Second	(Mexico) Sergio Pérez	Sauber-Ferrari
Third	(United Kingdom) Lewis Hamilton	McLaren-Mercedes

External videos
- Highlights of the grand prix from BBC Sport BBC Sport, 25 March 2012

The 2012 Malaysian Grand Prix (officially the 2012 Formula 1 Petronas Malaysia Grand Prix) was a Formula One motor race held on 25 March 2012 at the Sepang International Circuit in Selangor, Malaysia. It was the fourteenth running of the Malaysian Grand Prix as a round of the Formula One World Championship, and the thirty-second time the event has been held. The 56-lap race was the second round of the 2012 Formula One season and was won by Ferrari driver Fernando Alonso. Sergio Pérez of the Sauber team finished the race in second position, and McLaren driver Lewis Hamilton completed the podium with third place after starting in pole position.

Sergio Pérez achieved his first podium finish. The Sauber team recorded their best ever result (excluding their time as BMW Sauber) and also the first podium for a Ferrari customer engine since Sebastian Vettel's victory at the 2008 Italian Grand Prix in a Ferrari-engined Toro Rosso. Jean-Éric Vergne scored his first ever points in Formula One in his second race by finishing in eighth position.

== Report ==
=== Background ===
Following extended debate over the legality of the Mercedes rear wing and front-wing F-duct on the F1 W03 during the Australian Grand Prix, and the threat of a protest against the system, Red Bull Racing and Lotus F1 requested a final ruling on the system ahead of the race at Sepang. On the Thursday before the race the FIA rejected all claims that the system was illegal, allowing Mercedes to compete with an unaltered car.

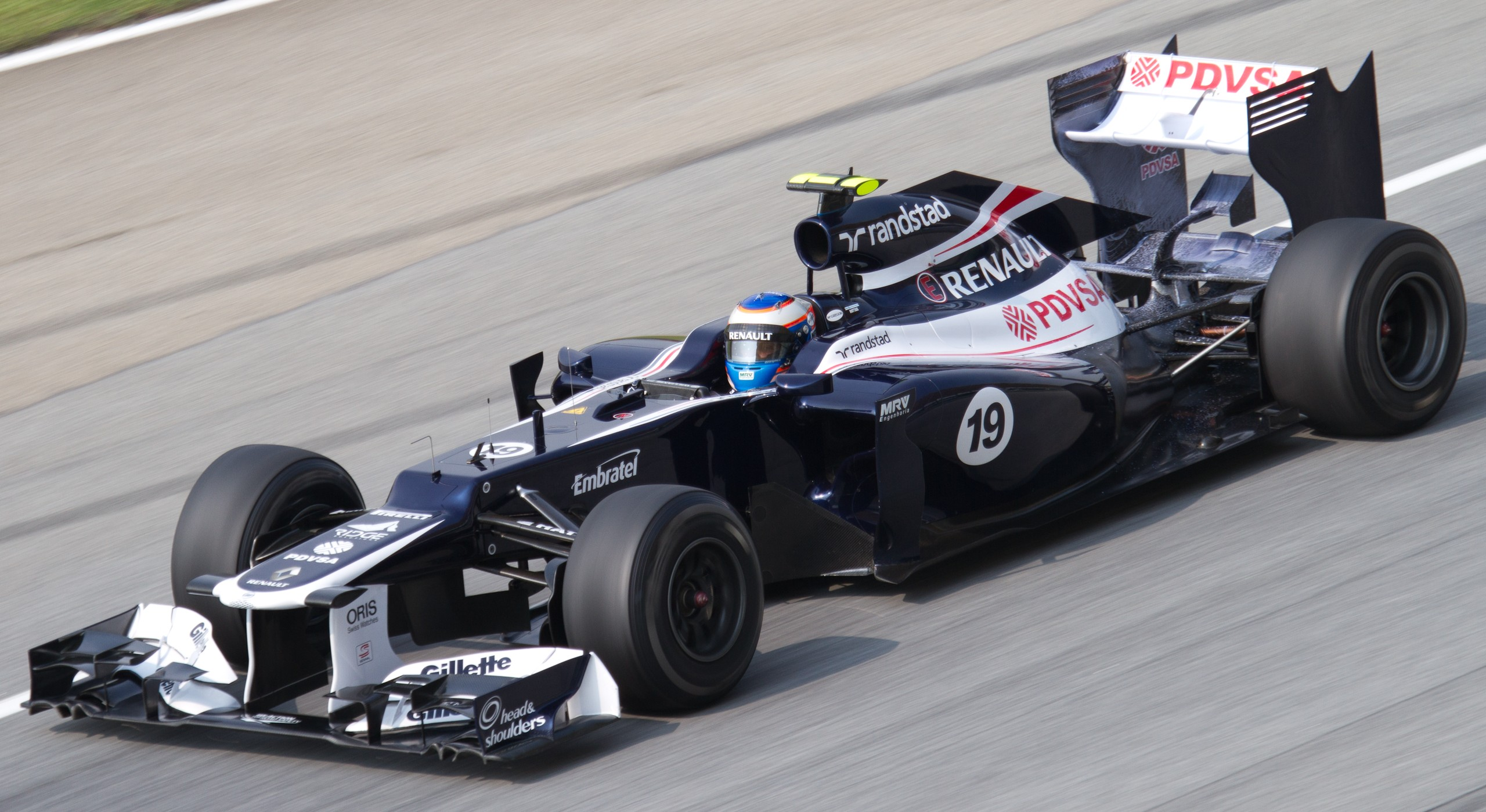
Valtteri Bottas was scheduled to drive during FP1 for Williams.

Caterham driver Heikki Kovalainen was given a five-place grid penalty for the race for being in breach of Article 40.8 of the sporting regulations. Article 40.8, which governs procedures for restarts under the safety car, states that no driver may overtake another until such time as he has crossed the first safety car control line on the circuit (except in the case of race control allowing lapped traffic to be released from behind the safety car). Kovalainen was penalised for passing two cars before he crossed this line during the Australian Grand Prix. Kimi Räikkönen was also given a five-place grid penalty after his team changed the gearbox in his car after Friday practice.

After struggling in the Australian Grand Prix, Ferrari prepared a brand-new F2012 chassis for Felipe Massa, with the team citing "unusual performance" of the chassis he used in Melbourne as the reason for the change. The team denied reports that they were planning to replace Massa with Sauber driver Sergio Pérez – who is a part of the Ferrari Driver Academy – while both Sauber and Pérez claimed that they had not been contacted by Ferrari.

HRT driver Pedro de la Rosa expressed confidence that his team would qualify for the race. HRT failed to qualify for the Australian Grand Prix the week before the race in Malaysia, with both de la Rosa and teammate Narain Karthikeyan failing to set a lap time within 107% of the fastest time set in the first qualifying period. De la Rosa admitted that the team did not have a Drag Reduction System (DRS) device available to them in Australia, and expected the addition of the system to the HRT F112 to yield up to a second per lap in qualifying.

Williams test driver Valtteri Bottas replaced Bruno Senna for the first practice session on Friday morning.

The race used a single DRS zone, unchanged from the 2011 race, with the detection point located on the back straight and the activation point immediately after the final turn.

Tyre supplier Pirelli brought its silver-banded hard compound tyre as the harder "prime" tyre and the white-banded medium compound as the softer "option" compound, whereas last year the "soft" compound was the yellow-banded soft compound tyre.

=== Free practice ===
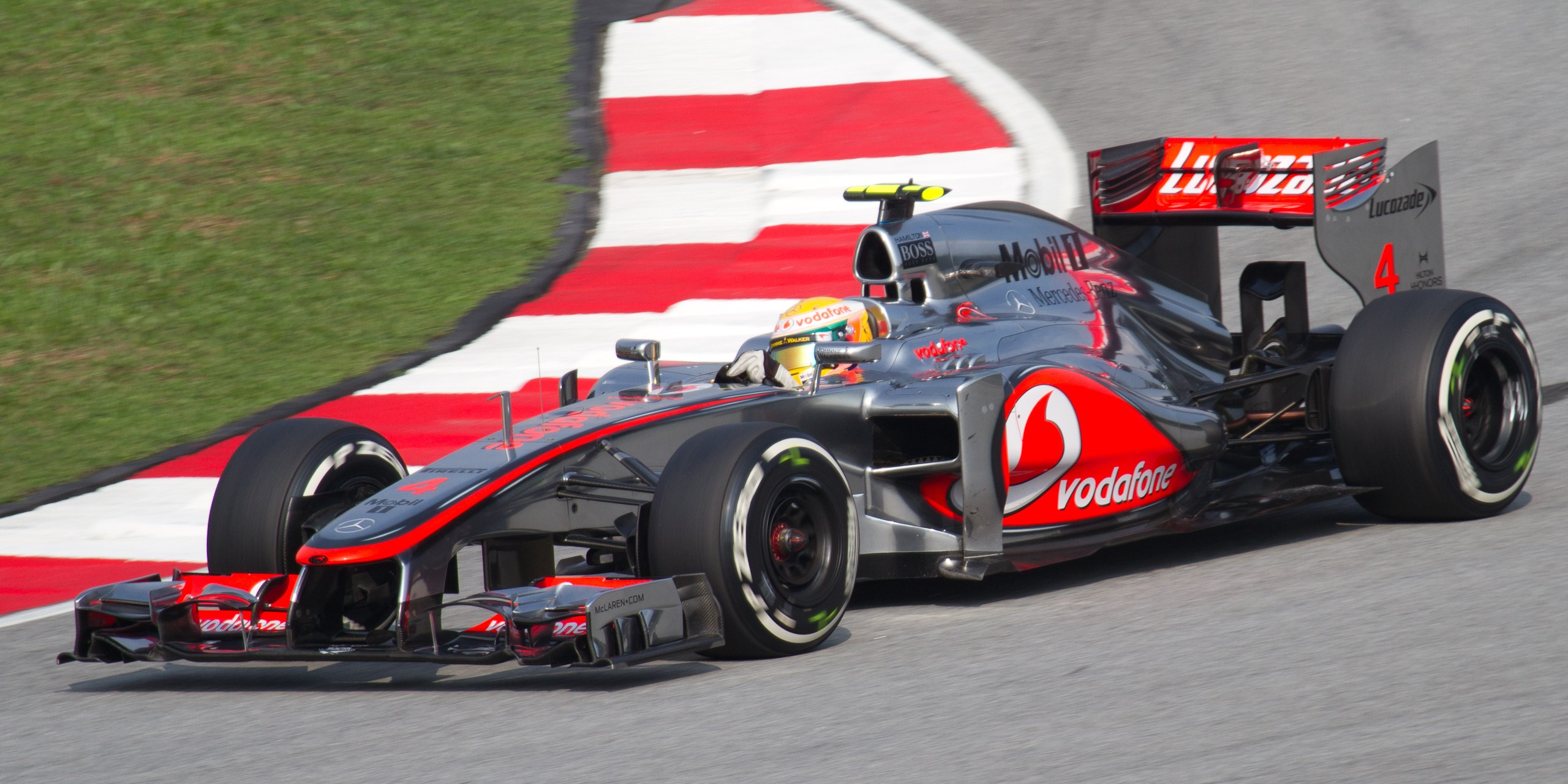
Lewis Hamilton topped both Friday practice sessions.

Lewis Hamilton was the fastest driver in the first practice session, ahead of Sebastian Vettel and Nico Rosberg. Romain Grosjean finished the session fifth-fastest despite his car becoming stuck in seventh gear. Jenson Button was ninth overall, but was forced to end his session early after the team discovered an oil leak. Ferrari's difficult start to the season continued with Felipe Massa and Fernando Alonso finishing thirteenth and fifteenth respectively, while HRT encountered further difficulties, with Narain Karthikeyan's car crippled by transmission problems; both Karthikeyan and de la Rosa finished the session seven seconds slower than Hamilton.

Hamilton repeated his performance in the second session, setting a lap time one-tenth of a second slower than the time he posted in the first session. Michael Schumacher was second-fastest, with Jenson Button third. Bruno Senna returned to the cockpit after Williams test driver Valtteri Bottas completed the morning session in Senna's car; Senna placed nineteenth overall. After placing fifteenth in the first session, Fernando Alonso ended the day sixth-fastest, though his lap time was only a tenth of a second faster than his time in the first session. Teammate Massa languished in sixteenth, considerably slower in the afternoon than he was in the morning. Both HRT drivers managed to improve their morning times by two seconds, to end the session five seconds adrift.

A fire broke out in the premises of Lotus early on Saturday morning. The fire started with an electrical fault in the refrigerator. Lotus's reception unit and the stable's kitchen were destroyed in the fire. No one was injured in the fire.

The circuit was declared damp for the third and final practice session on Saturday afternoon after light rain fell during the GP2 support race. The damp conditions saw several drivers – most notably Lewis Hamilton – running wide early on, before a dry line was established. Despite the off-track excursions, the session was not interrupted by red flags. Rosberg topped the sixty-minute session, the only driver to go below one minute thirty-seven for all practice sessions, ahead of Vettel and Mark Webber. The Ferraris once again struggled, with Alonso in thirteenth place, 1.3 seconds behind Rosberg, and Massa in sixteenth, a further second behind. The two HRT drivers continued to languish five seconds off the pace, but were within sight of the Marussias of Timo Glock and Charles Pic.

=== Qualifying ===
Unlike the cooler conditions of the previous race in Melbourne, qualifying was run under hot and sunny conditions with an ambient temperature of 32 °C (90 °F) and a track temperature of 46 °C (115 °F).

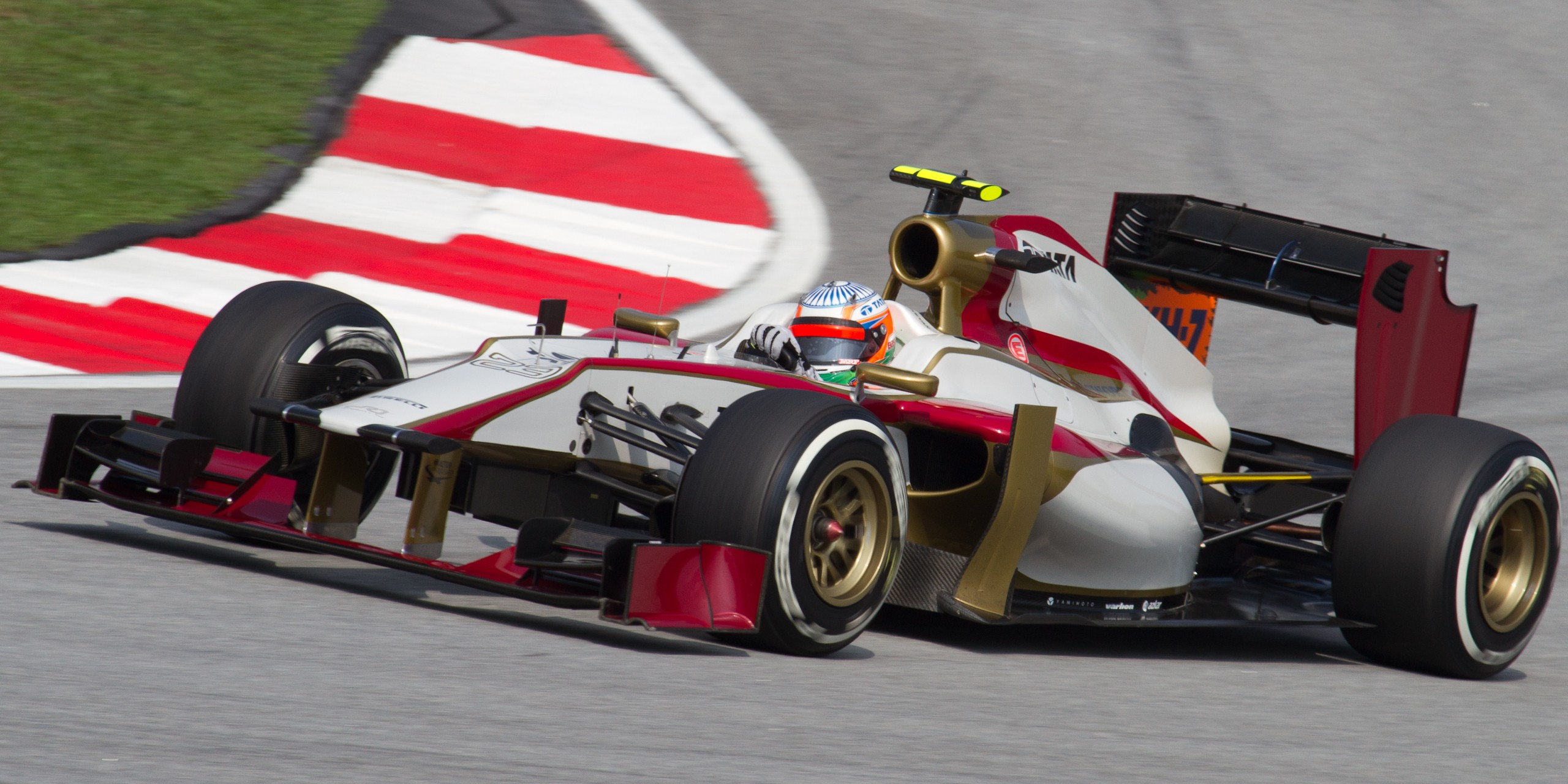
Narain Karthikeyan and HRT qualified within the 107% rule for the first time in the 2012 season.

The first qualifying period began with Paul di Resta leading a host of cars for their first flying lap. As expected, most teams posted their early timed laps on the slower 'prime' tyre and after ten minutes the four Mercedes powered cars from McLaren and Mercedes were ahead, led by Michael Schumacher. As in Melbourne, Felipe Massa was again in danger of being eliminated and as a result he and teammate Fernando Alonso both used a set of the medium 'option' tyre to avoid an embarrassing elimination. Late on in the session, Mark Webber also switched to the softer tyres and consequently set the fastest time of 1-minute 37.172 seconds. Significantly, both the HRT Pedro de la Rosa and Narain Karthikeyan were within the 107% time needed to qualify because of Webber's lap. A front right wheel lock-up going into the braking zone of turn 1 resulted in severe vibration and effectively eliminated Toro Rosso's Jean-Éric Vergne on his final timed run. He finished the session 18th ahead of the Caterham cars of Heikki Kovalainen and Vitaly Petrov. Kovalainen was later demoted from his 19th place slot to the back of the grid, for the first time in his career, because of a five place grid penalty he incurred at the last race for overtaking under safety car conditions. The HRTs occupied the two places in front of him, the two Marussia cars were in front of them (with Timo Glock out-qualifying rookie Charles Pic) and teammate Petrov moved up into 19th. Schumacher and Jenson Button rounded out the top three.

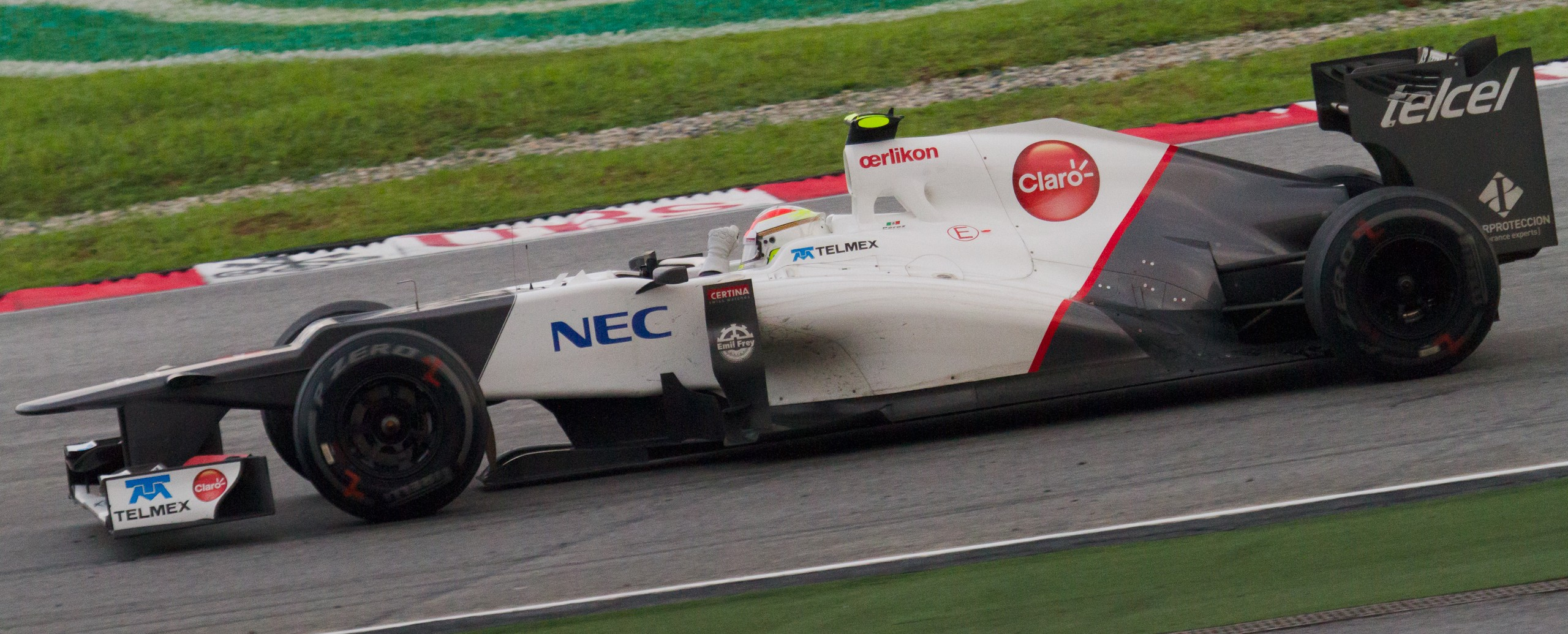
Sergio Pérez qualified just behind eventual race winner Fernando Alonso in 10th.

The second session began with Sergio Pérez the first to set a timed lap. All drivers opted for the softer compound medium tyre. Kimi Räikkönen set the fastest time in a session which saw all the cars set closely matched times. Pastor Maldonado had a minor off before turn 11 and was the quickest driver not to make the final session; his Williams teammate Bruno Senna was 13th. Ferrari driver Felipe Massa (who had a new chassis for the weekend) was 12th, closing the gap between himself and Fernando Alonso from one second, as it had been in Australia, to four tenths. Alonso, however, managed to make it into the final session. The two Force Indias qualified in 14th and 16th positions, with di Resta fractionally beating Nico Hülkenberg's time. Daniel Ricciardo was 15th for Toro Rosso, three places ahead of Vergne, whilst Kamui Kobayashi took up the last place (17th). Kobayashi's Sauber teammate, Sergio Pérez, did manage to make it into the final part if qualifying. When the chequered flag was waved Schumacher held 11th place provisionally, behind Maldonado (9th) and teammate Nico Rosberg. However, both Mercedes cars were already on hot laps before the flag was waved, and were able to complete their laps to improve their times. This pushed Maldonado outside of the top ten fastest times, meaning he couldn't participate in the final session any more.

Despite a front left wheel lock-up at the final corner, Lewis Hamilton set the fastest time by four tenths of a second upon his first attempt. He subsequently returned to the pits during his second, knowing that he already had pole position. The second McLaren of Jenson Button set the second fastest time, one tenth behind Hamilton's time, to complete the second McLaren front row lock-out in the season's two races. Michael Schumacher demonstrated the improved pace of the Mercedes car since 2011 by achieving his highest qualifying position since his return to the sport, with third place. Webber and Räikkönen set an identical time, but Webber was granted fourth position because he set his time first. Räikkönen's five place grid penalty for gearbox change meant he dropped from fifth to tenth place, despite an otherwise impressive performance from the Lotus team. This promoted Sebastian Vettel to fifth position, who had chosen to set his lap on the harder 'prime' tyres. The second Lotus of Romain Grosjean had another good qualifying with sixth place, after Räikkönen's penalty. Rosberg, Alonso and Pérez took seventh, eighth and ninth respectively on the grid. The final session was so closely fought out that the top eight drivers were separated by less than half a second.

=== Race ===
Forty minutes before the race the pitwall radar read that more than thirty minutes of steady 2-3 (0 = no rain and 4 = heavy shower) intensity rain was expected at 15:50 pm local time (ten mins before race start). All drivers except the two HRT's began the race on the green banded intermediate tyre. The HRT team opted for the blue banded full wet tyres. Grosjean starting from 7th, made a good start and was third into turn 1. Schumacher and Grosjean made contact at turn 4 and both spun, losing several positions in the process and Grosjean eventually retired on lap 4 after spinning into a gravel trap. On the first lap, turn 9 to 11 was almost completely dry but the rest of the track was very wet. Pérez stopped after the first lap to change to full wets in a move that would elevate him to an eventual podium scoring position. With almost all drivers having pitted onto full wets by laps 5, the pitwall radar was shown to read "the intensity will increase to 4 from time to time" meaning heavy rain was still to come.

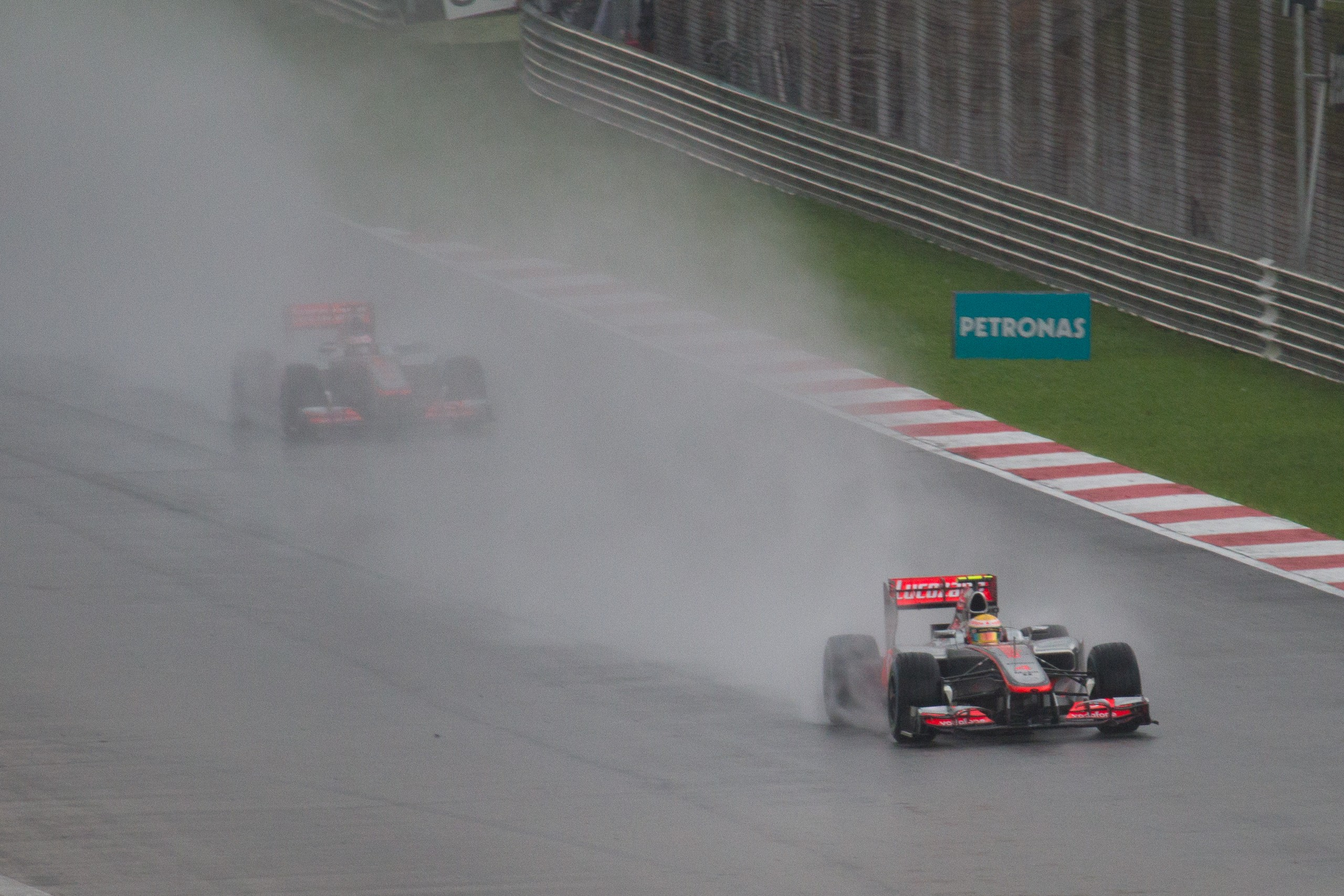
Lewis Hamilton leading teammate Jenson Button during the early stages of the Grand Prix.

The safety car was deployed on the 7th lap, purely because of the heavy rain, and the race was suspended on lap 9. This worked in favour of Jean-Éric Vergne, the only driver still running on intermediates, who was able to change to full wets (as required by race officials) without the necessity of a pit stop. The HRT of Karthikeyan benefited from starting the race on full wets, having not needed to pit stop and was in tenth when the race was suspended. Grosjean's car was rescued from the gravel and brought back in the pits during the suspension. The race suspension last around fifty minutes and in that time many drivers opted to leave their car and some (Rosberg) changed footwear. While the cars were suspended on the grid, many teams brought out gazebos to place over their cars to keep them and team equipment (i.e. laptops and tyre warmers) dry.

The race restarted under the safety car around local time 17:15. As the track steadily dried pit crew members attempted to dry the team pit box. After 4 laps behind the safety car, the majority of the drivers once again pitted to change to intermediate tyres, meanwhile Vettel lost his radio so he had to use the pit confirmation button on his steering wheel for most of the race. On lap 15, Jenson Button clumsily locked up the rear wheels and made contact with Karthikeyan (in a battle for track position), forcing him to pit again to change the front wing, ending his podium chances. Subsequently, he made up a few places but was unable to finish in the top 10. Alonso emerged from this as the new leader when he overtook Sergio Pérez on lap 16, a lead he only briefly relinquished with a lap 40 pit stop. Rosberg was in fourth on lap 23 but slowly slipped backwards when his tyres overheated and he consequently pitted early for more inters. As the track slowly dried further, the top five all had comfortable gaps between them. During this period Senna was posting quick lap times and moving up through the midfield.

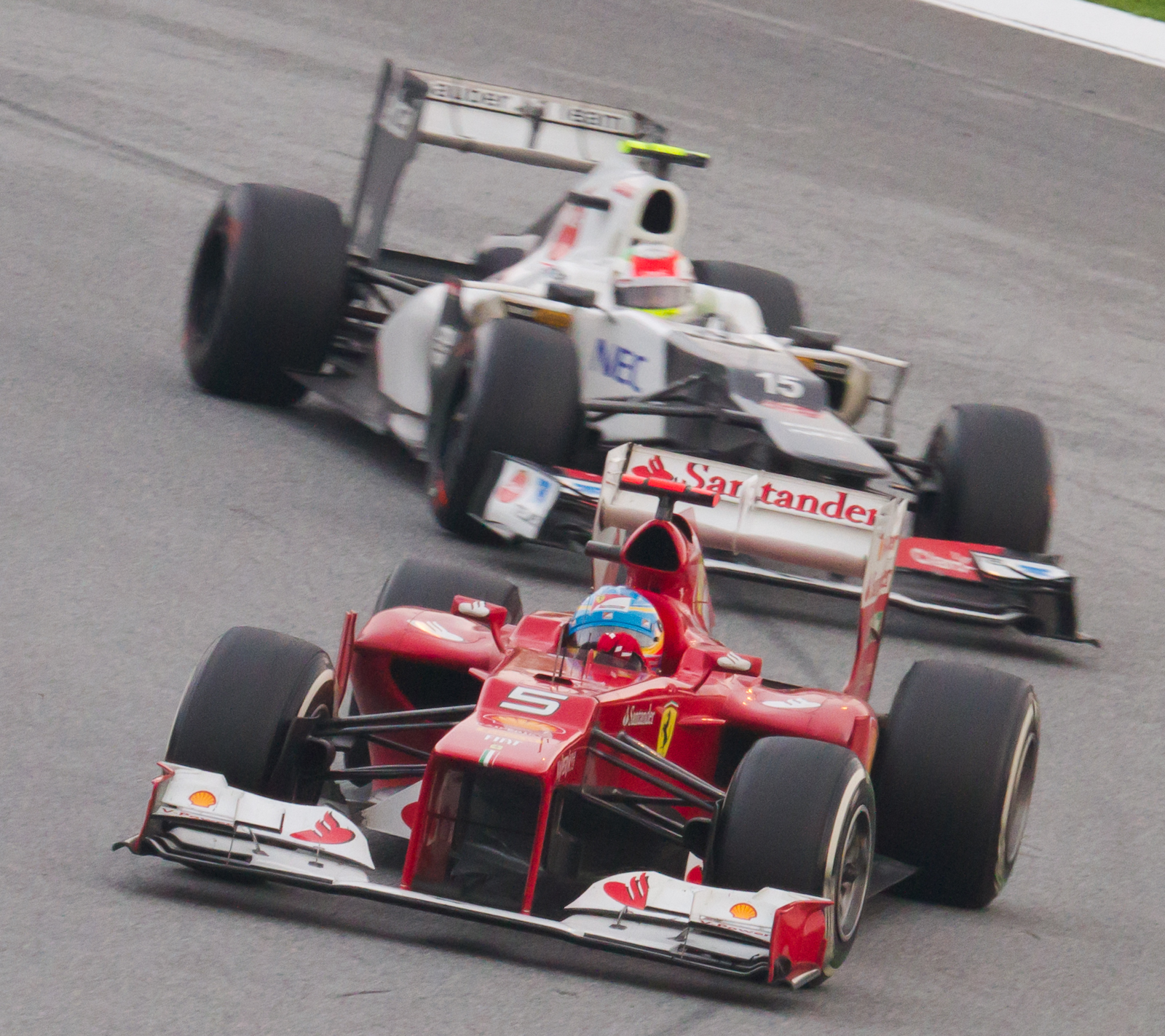
Sergio Pérez chasing down race leader Fernando Alonso.

By lap 31 heavier rain was again forecast but never eventuated. After being 7.795 seconds behind Alonso in 2nd, Pérez began to set consecutive fastest laps and was closing the gap to the leader. The forecast rain prevented most cars from changing to slicks when the track was dry. An image of Hamilton's front tyre revealed that drivers were essentially racing on slicks anyway as the intermediate tread had worn off. Daniel Ricciardo was the first to take the gamble and change to dry tyres on lap 37. The teams watched his lap times go purple (fastest for the day) for every sector on the timescreens. He set the fastest lap by some three seconds on Pérez and that initiated the change from wet to dry tyres for everyone else. By lap 39, Pérez had excellent pace and cut the gap to Alonso back down to 1.339 seconds. Between laps 39 and 42 there was yet another round of pit stops, this time onto slick tyres. Alonso pitted on lap 40 while Pérez waited until the next lap. In that time Pérez, who prior to the pitstop had been within two seconds, now dropped to 7.180 seconds off Alonso. After the change to slicks, Pérez on the prime tyre, again consistently cut down on Alonso's (medium tyre) lead to within half a second. Controversially on lap 50, Pérez was told on the radio "be careful, we need this position" referring to the 18 points on offer for 2nd place. On the same lap Pérez took too much curb on turn 14 and had a slight off. This cost him at least five seconds and ensured he remain in 2nd position. Commentators questioned whether Sauber - whose engine is supplied by Ferrari - gave a coded message to Pérez asking him to allow the engine supplier to take victory. Sauber denied this emphatically after the race. Late in the race, Vettel received a puncture against the front wing of Narain Karthikeyan, and he pitted from 4th place, finishing 11th; Karthikeyan was given a 20-second post-race penalty for his part in the collision. Pastor Maldonado, who was running 10th, was forced to retire on the penultimate lap when his engine gave way, allowing Michael Schumacher his first points of the season.

=== Post-race ===
Vettel and Red Bull boss Christian Horner criticised Karthikeyan's driving, with Vettel calling Karthikeyan an "idiot". Karthikeyan hit back at Vettel, calling him a "cry-baby". Later, Karthikeyan decided to call a truce with Vettel, stating his respect for Vettel's abilities and saying "I think we have to deal with it in a mature way and forget about it."

By winning the race, Alonso took the lead in the Drivers' Championship, having been fifth in the standings before the race. Hamilton moved up to second in the standings on 30 points, five behind Alonso. Button dropped from the lead in standings to third, now five points behind Hamilton. Webber remained fourth, one point behind Button, whilst Pérez moved himself up to fifth place. As far as the Constructors' Championship was concerned, McLaren still led, and had increased the gap to Red Bull to 13 points. Ferrari overtook Sauber to take third in the standings.

== Support events ==
The event took place between the 22–25 March where throughout the weekend there was a range of support events. Taking part in the Malaysian Grand Prix program was the opening round of the 2012 GP2 Series (1 feature race, 1 sprint race); the Malaysian Super Series A (2 races); and the Malaysian Super Series B (2 races).

== Classification ==
=== Qualifying ===
Pos.	No.	Driver	Constructor	Part 1	Part 2	Part 3	Grid
1	4	(United Kingdom) Lewis Hamilton	McLaren-Mercedes	1:37.813	1:37.106	1:36.219	1
2	3	(United Kingdom) Jenson Button	McLaren-Mercedes	1:37.575	1:36.928	1:36.368	2
3	7	(Germany) Michael Schumacher	Mercedes	1:37.517	1:37.017	1:36.391	3
4	2	(Australia) Mark Webber	Red Bull-Renault	1:37.172	1:37.375	1:36.461	4
5	9	(Finland) Kimi Räikkönen	Lotus-Renault	1:37.961	1:36.715	1:36.461	10^{1}
6	1	(Germany) Sebastian Vettel	Red Bull-Renault	1:38.102	1:37.419	1:36.634	5
7	10	(France) Romain Grosjean	Lotus-Renault	1:38.058	1:37.338	1:36.658	6
8	8	(Germany) Nico Rosberg	Mercedes	1:37.696	1:36.996	1:36.664	7
9	5	(Spain) Fernando Alonso	Ferrari	1:38.151	1:37.379	1:37.566	8
10	15	(Mexico) Sergio Pérez	Sauber-Ferrari	1:37.933	1:37.477	1:37.698	9
11	18	(Venezuela) Pastor Maldonado	Williams-Renault	1:37.789	1:37.589		11
12	6	(Brazil) Felipe Massa	Ferrari	1:38.381	1:37.731		12
13	19	(Brazil) Bruno Senna	Williams-Renault	1:38.437	1:37.841		13
14	11	(United Kingdom) Paul di Resta	Force India-Mercedes	1:38.325	1:37.877		14
15	16	(Australia) Daniel Ricciardo	Toro Rosso-Ferrari	1:38.419	1:37.883		15
16	12	(Germany) Nico Hülkenberg	Force India-Mercedes	1:38.303	1:37.890		16
17	14	(Japan) Kamui Kobayashi	Sauber-Ferrari	1:38.372	1:38.069		17
18	17	(France) Jean-Éric Vergne	Toro Rosso-Ferrari	1:39.077			18
19	20	(Finland) Heikki Kovalainen	Caterham-Renault	1:39.306			24^{2}
20	21	(Russia) Vitaly Petrov	Caterham-Renault	1:39.567			19
21	24	(Germany) Timo Glock	Marussia-Cosworth	1:40.903			20
22	25	(France) Charles Pic	Marussia-Cosworth	1:41.250			21
23	22	(Spain) Pedro de la Rosa	HRT-Cosworth	1:42.914			22
24	23	(India) Narain Karthikeyan	HRT-Cosworth	1:43.655			23
107% time: 1:43.974

Notes
^1 — Kimi Räikkönen was given a five-place grid penalty for a gearbox change after the second practice session.
^2 — Heikki Kovalainen was given a five-place grid penalty for overtaking cars on a restart prior to passing the safety car line at the Australian Grand Prix.

=== Race ===
Pos.	No.	Driver	Constructor	Laps	Time/Retired	Grid	Points
1	5	(Spain) Fernando Alonso	Ferrari	56	2:44:51.812	8	25
2	15	(Mexico) Sergio Pérez	Sauber-Ferrari	56	+2.263	9	18
3	4	(United Kingdom) Lewis Hamilton	McLaren-Mercedes	56	+14.591	1	15
4	2	(Australia) Mark Webber	Red Bull-Renault	56	+17.688	4	12
5	9	(Finland) Kimi Räikkönen	Lotus-Renault	56	+29.456	10	10
6	19	(Brazil) Bruno Senna	Williams-Renault	56	+37.667	13	8
7	11	(United Kingdom) Paul di Resta	Force India-Mercedes	56	+44.412	14	6
8	17	(France) Jean-Éric Vergne	Toro Rosso-Ferrari	56	+46.985	18	4
9	12	(Germany) Nico Hülkenberg	Force India-Mercedes	56	+47.892	16	2
10	7	(Germany) Michael Schumacher	Mercedes	56	+49.996	3	1
11	1	(Germany) Sebastian Vettel	Red Bull-Renault	56	+1:15.527	5	
12	16	(Australia) Daniel Ricciardo	Toro Rosso-Ferrari	56	+1:16.828	15	
13	8	(Germany) Nico Rosberg	Mercedes	56	+1:18.593	7	
14	3	(United Kingdom) Jenson Button	McLaren-Mercedes	56	+1:19.719	2	
15	6	(Brazil) Felipe Massa	Ferrari	56	+1:37.319	12	
16	21	(Russia) Vitaly Petrov	Caterham-Renault	55	+1 Lap	19	
17	24	(Germany) Timo Glock	Marussia-Cosworth	55	+1 Lap	20	
18	20	(Finland) Heikki Kovalainen	Caterham-Renault	55	+1 Lap	24	
19	18	(Venezuela) Pastor Maldonado	Williams-Renault	54	Engine	11	
20	25	(France) Charles Pic	Marussia-Cosworth	54	+2 Laps	21	
21	22	(Spain) Pedro de la Rosa	HRT-Cosworth	54	+2 Laps	PL^{1}	
22	23	(India) Narain Karthikeyan	HRT-Cosworth	54	+2 Laps^{2}	23	
Ret	14	(Japan) Kamui Kobayashi	Sauber-Ferrari	46	Brakes	17	
Ret	10	(France) Romain Grosjean	Lotus-Renault	3	Spun off	6	

Notes

- ^1 – Pedro de la Rosa started the race from the pitlane.
- ^2 – Narain Karthikeyan finished 21st but was given a post-race 20 second penalty for causing a collision with Sebastian Vettel.

== Championship standings after the race ==
Drivers' Championship standings

	Pos.	Driver	Points
4	1	(Spain) Fernando Alonso	35
1	2	(United Kingdom) Lewis Hamilton	30
2	3	(United Kingdom) Jenson Button	25
	4	(Australia) Mark Webber	24
3	5	(Mexico) Sergio Pérez	22

Constructors' Championship standings

	Pos.	Constructor	Points
	1	(United Kingdom) McLaren-Mercedes	55
	2	(Austria) Red Bull-Renault	42
1	3	(Italy) Ferrari	35
1	4	(Switzerland) Sauber-Ferrari	30
	5	(United Kingdom) Lotus-Renault	16

- Note: Only the top five positions are included for both sets of standings.

== See also ==
- 2012 Sepang GP2 Series round

Previous race: 2012 Australian Grand Prix	FIA Formula One World Championship; 2012 season	Next race: 2012 Chinese Grand Prix
Previous race: 2011 Malaysian Grand Prix	Malaysian Grand Prix	Next race: 2013 Malaysian Grand Prix
