= Mercedes F1 W06 Hybrid =

2015 Formula One racing car

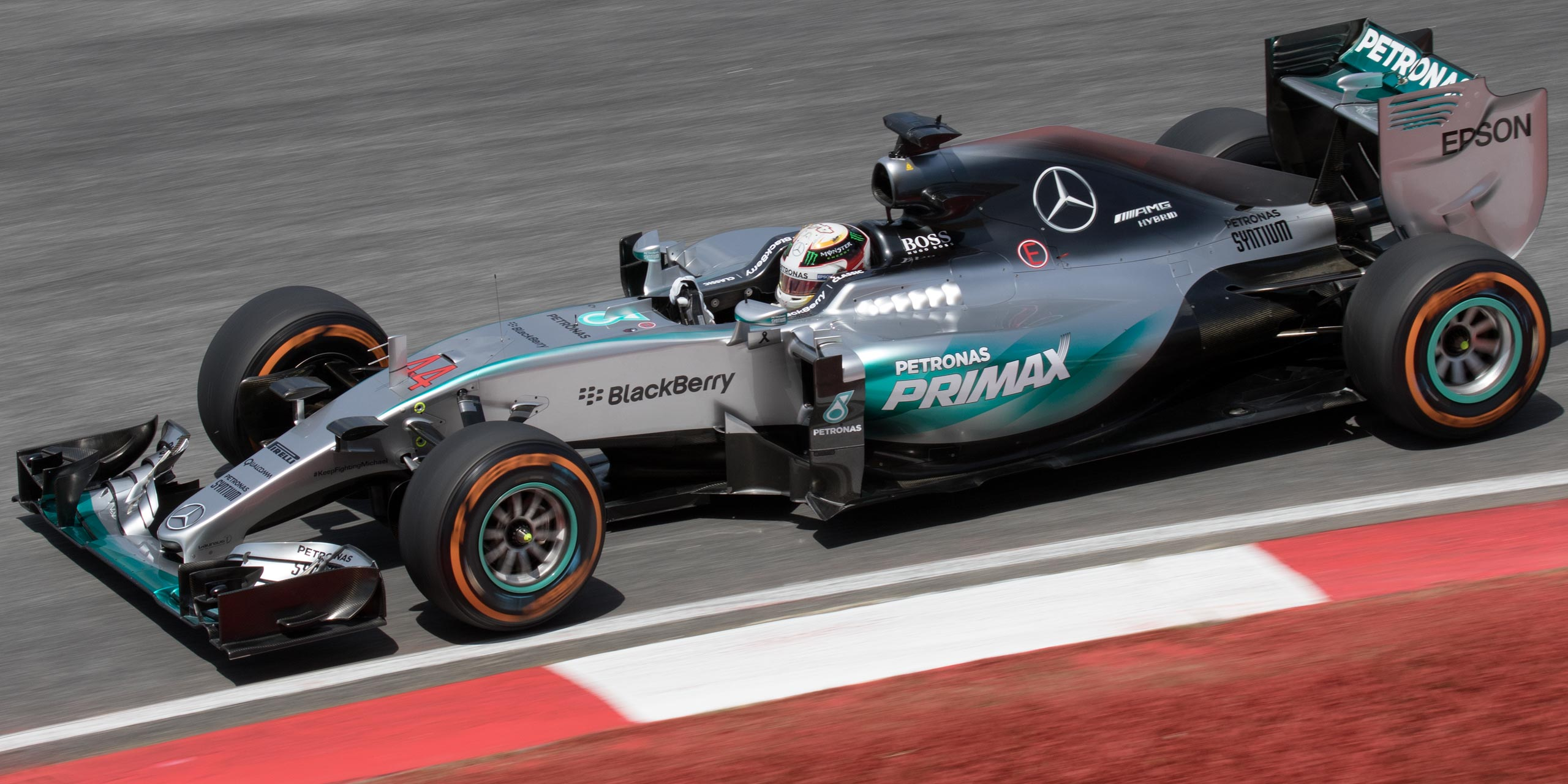
- The F1 W06 Hybrid, driven by Lewis Hamilton, during the Malaysian Grand Prix
- Category: Formula One
- Constructor: Mercedes
- Designers: Paddy Lowe (Technical Director); Aldo Costa (Engineering Director); Geoff Willis (Technology Director); Mark Ellis (Performance Director); John Owen (Chief Designer); Loïc Serra (Chief Vehicle Dynamicist); Russell Cooley (Chief Engineer); Mike Elliott (Head of Aerodynamics); Jarrod Murphy (Chief Aerodynamicist); Andy Cowell (Managing Director - Power Unit); Hywel Thomas (Engineering Director - Power Unit)
- Predecessor: Mercedes F1 W05 Hybrid
- Successor: Mercedes F1 W07 Hybrid

Technical specifications
- Chassis: Moulded carbon fibre & Honeycomb composite structure
- Suspension (front): Carbon fibre wishbone and pushrod activated torsion springs & rockers
- Suspension (rear): Carbon fibre wishbone and pullrod activated torsion springs & rockers
- Length: 5,000 mm (197 in)
- Width: 1,800 mm (71 in)
- Height: 950 mm (37 in)
- Engine: Mercedes-Benz PU106B Hybrid, 1.6 L (98 cu in), 90° - V6 turbocharged engine, limited to 15,000 RPM, in a mid-mounted, rear-wheel drive layout
- Electric motor: Motor Generator Unit–Kinetic (MGU-K), Motor Generator Unit–Heat (MGU-H)
- Transmission: Mercedes semi-automatic seamless shift sequential gearbox with 8-speed forward and 1 reverse gears
- Battery: Mercedes lithium-ion batteries solution
- Power: 870 horsepower (650 kW)
- Weight: 702 kg (1,547.6 lb)
- Fuel: Petronas Primax
- Lubricants: Petronas Syntium & Tutela
- Brakes: Carbone Industrie carbon brake discs, pads and Brembo brake calipers with rear brake-by-wire
- Tyres: Pirelli P Zero (Dry/Slick); Pirelli Cinturato (Wet/Treaded); Advanti forged magnesium wheels: 13"
- Clutch: Carbon fibre reinforced carbon plate

Competition history
- Notable entrants: Mercedes AMG Petronas F1 Team
- Notable drivers: 6. (Germany) Nico Rosberg; 44. (United Kingdom) Lewis Hamilton
- Debut: 2015 Australian Grand Prix
- First win: 2015 Australian Grand Prix
- Last win: 2015 Abu Dhabi Grand Prix
- Last event: 2015 Abu Dhabi Grand Prix
Races	Wins	Podiums	Poles	F/Laps
19	16	32	18	13
- Constructors' Championships: 1 (2015)
- Drivers' Championships: 1 (Lewis Hamilton, 2015)

The Mercedes F1 W06 Hybrid (commonly abbreviated as the Mercedes W06) is a highly successful Mercedes-Benz Formula One racing car designed and developed under the direction of Paddy Lowe, Aldo Costa, Geoff Willis, Loïc Serra, Russell Cooley, John Owen, Mike Elliott and Jarrod Murphy to compete in the 2015 FIA Formula One World Championship. The cars were driven by Nico Rosberg and the reigning World Champion Lewis Hamilton, who remained with the team for a sixth and third season, respectively.

The chassis was named "F1 W06 Hybrid" to represent the sixth Formula One car that Mercedes had constructed since 2010, while the hybrid was marked to recognize the utilization of fully integrated hybrid power units. The car made its competitive debut at the 2015 Australian Grand Prix, the opening round of the 2015 season. After participating in 18 rounds of Grand Prix racing, the car made its final competition appearance at the season finale race – the 2015 Abu Dhabi Grand Prix, before retirement.

== Design and development ==
The F1 W06 Hybrid was the successor of the highly successful F1 W05 Hybrid, which has been described as one of the most dominant in the sport's history. The new car was seen as an evolutionary design, with Lewis Hamilton declaring that "it is difficult to pick up any differences" between the two. Differences in design, apart from regulated changes for noses and front wings, were minimal, such as changes to the upper part of the suspension.

=== In-season development ===
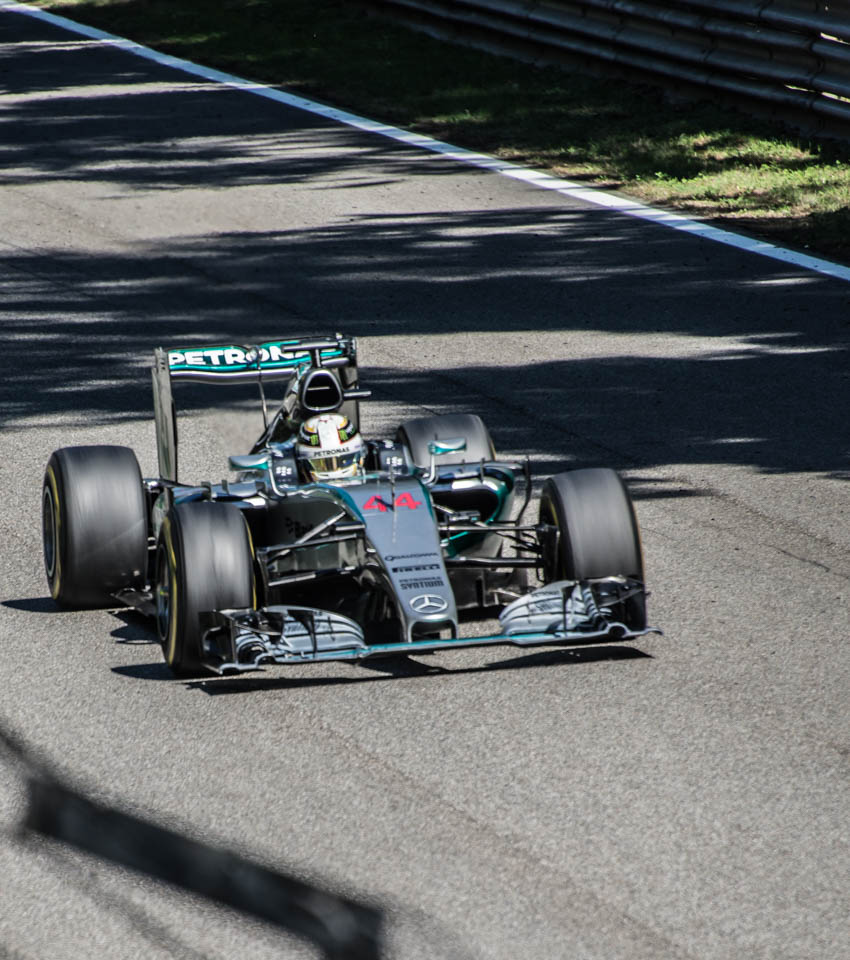
Hamilton using the curved rear wing at the Italian Grand Prix.

The car underwent several changes over the course of the season, although not all of them were permanent. The first came at the Chinese Grand Prix, where Mercedes introduced new, square-shaped arches next to the front wing endplates as well as cuts near the rear wing endplates, aiming at a higher top speed. In Spain, the team arrived with narrower sidepods, including a small air duct at the bottom, either to aid cooling or to influence aerodynamics at the diffuser. At the following race in Monte Carlo, in order to improve downforce for the twisty nature of the Monaco circuit, Mercedes increased the size of the so-called "monkey seat", a smaller wing below the main rear wing.

Another change was made for the next event in Canada: the car received a larger radiator to improve the cooling of the power unit at a track where Mercedes had suffered failures of their ERS unit the year before. The larger part necessitated a bulge on the engine cover. The most obvious aerodynamic change was the curve rear wing which was introduced during Belgian Grand Prix, the introduction was to allow for a decrease in drag without the associated loss of downforce. The curve rear wing was again used at the notable track: Autodromo Nazionale Monza, hosting the Italian Grand Prix.

== Launch, pre-season and in-season testing ==
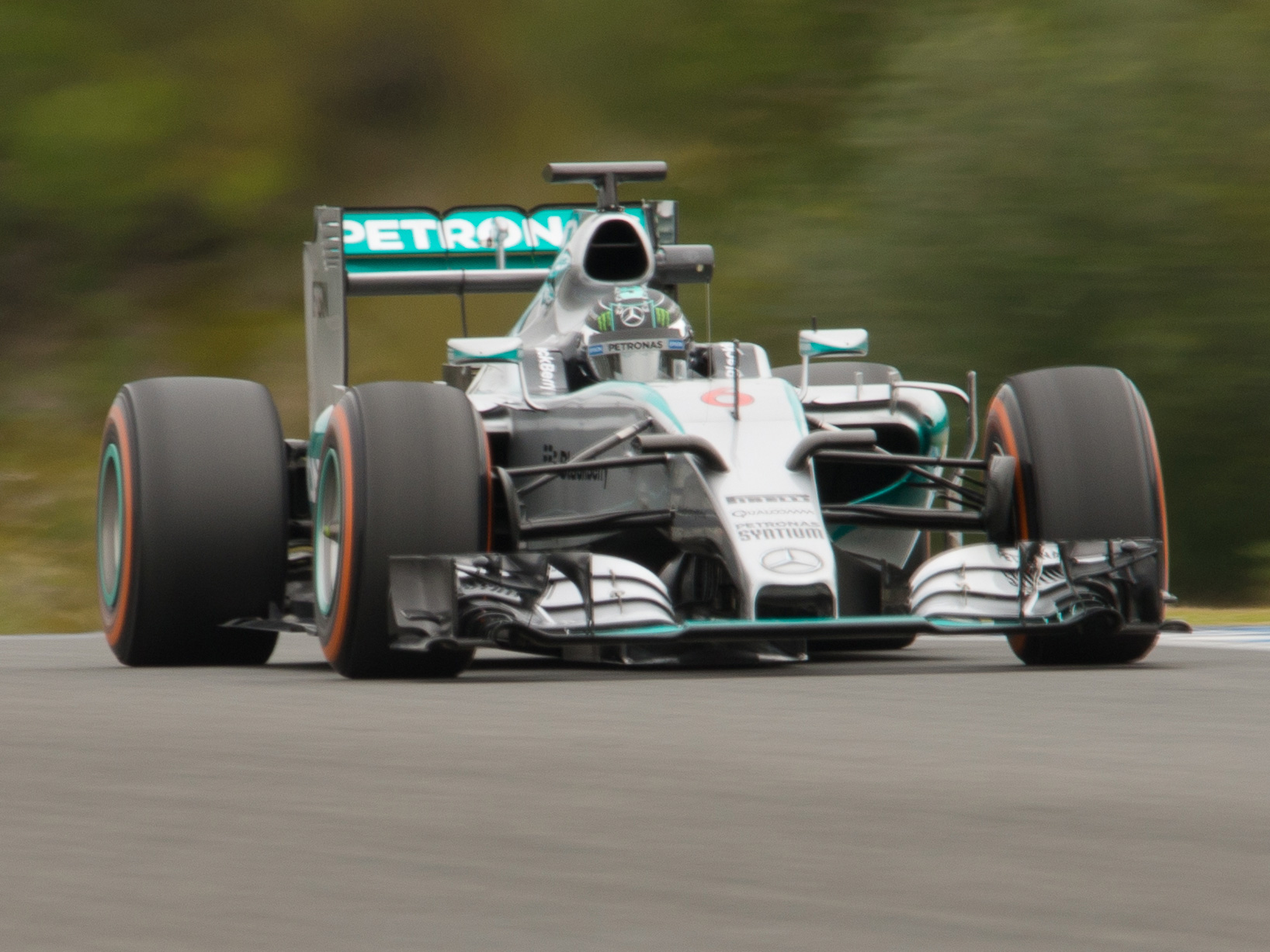
Rosberg testing the F1 W06 Hybrid at Circuito de Jerez in February 2015.

The F1 W06 Hybrid was officially unveiled on 1 February 2015 at the opening day of pre-season testing held at Circuito de Jerez. On the basis of 12 days of pre-season testing conducted at Jerez and Barcelona, the car completed 1340 laps; a total of 6,121 km (3,803.4 mi). Hamilton said during pre-season testing that the F1 W06 Hybrid felt equivalent to its predecessor. The car was also driven by 2015 DTM Champion: Pascal Wehrlein during in-season testing.

== Competitiveness and performance ==
The performance of the F1 W06 Hybrid was one of the most dominant in any F1 season, earning 703 constructor's points out of a possible 817; they lost just 114 points across the whole season (earning 86.0% of points available). Both cars finished on the podium for 9 consecutive races, matching the record held by Ferrari – from the 1952 Belgian Grand Prix to the 1953 Belgian Grand Prix. The team clinched their second consecutive Constructors' Championship at the Russian Grand Prix, the 15th race of the season. Hamilton clinched his third Driver's championship one race later at the United States Grand Prix after gaining his tenth win of the season. In the nineteen races, the F1 W06 Hybrid took sixteen wins (ten for Hamilton and six for Rosberg), eighteen pole positions (eleven for Hamilton and seven for Rosberg), thirteen fastest laps (eight for Hamilton and five for Rosberg), fifteen front row lockouts and twelve 1–2 finishes. The competitiveness and performance of F1 W06 Hybrid set numerous records throughout the season, following Mercedes' successes the previous year.

== Season summary ==
=== Opening rounds ===
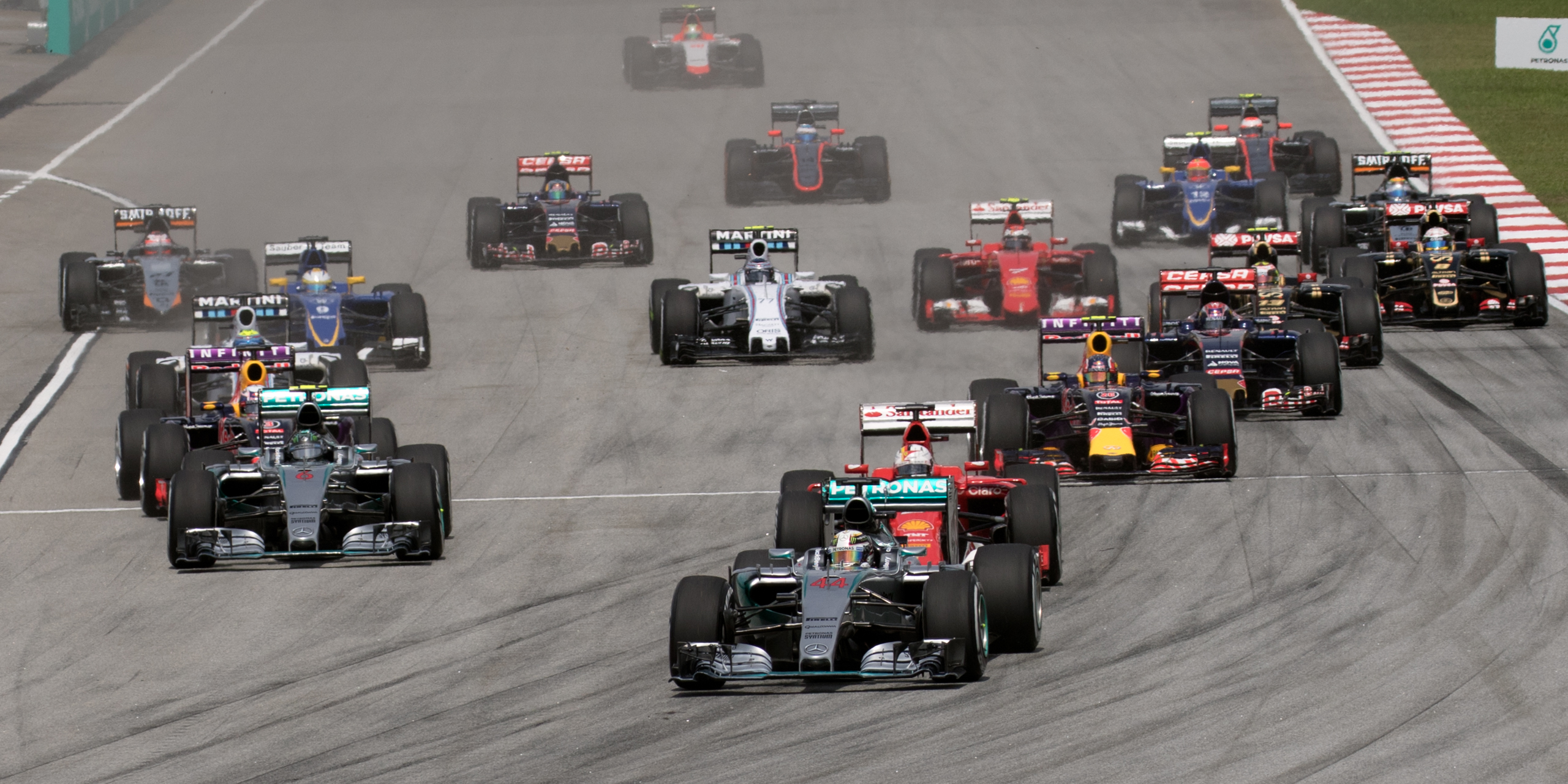
Hamilton lost the lead of the Malaysian Grand Prix early on, eventually finishing second.

Like its predecessor, the F1 W06 Hybrid started the season strongly. Lewis Hamilton took pole position for the season-opening Australian Grand Prix, ahead of teammate Nico Rosberg. Hamilton and Rosberg moved clear of the field at the start of the race, and ultimately recorded a 1–2 finish, over half a minute clear of Ferrari's Sebastian Vettel, who finished in third place. Hamilton took pole again at the Malaysian Grand Prix while Rosberg qualified third, as Vettel broke Mercedes's run of 9 consecutive front-row lockouts – dating back to 2014 Hungarian Grand Prix – by taking second place in the rain affected qualifying session. Mercedes finished the race with both cars on the podium, behind Vettel therefore allowing him to close to within three points of Hamilton in the drivers' standings after two rounds. The two Mercedes cars once again locked out the front row at the Chinese Grand Prix, and again ultimately recorded a 1–2 finish, this also gave Hamilton his second hat-trick of pole position, fastest lap and race win, from the first three races of the season.

Hamilton took his fourth consecutive pole position at the Bahrain Grand Prix while Rosberg qualified third. In the race, Hamilton took his third win of the season, while Rosberg finished third as Ferrari's Kimi Räikkönen overtook him on the penultimate lap due to Rosberg struggling with brake problems on his car. After four rounds, Mercedes had a 52-point lead over Ferrari. Rosberg took his first pole position of 2015, at the Spanish Grand Prix, beating his teammate Hamilton by over a quarter of a second, with Vettel in third position. Rosberg had a great start and took control of the race to take his first win of the season while Hamilton, using a three stop strategy to fend off Vettel in third place, completed a 1–2 finish.

=== European rounds ===
Mercedes locked out the front-row once again at the Monaco Grand Prix, with Hamilton on pole position for the fifth time and Rosberg in second place. During the race, Hamilton built up a sizable lead over Rosberg, leading every lap until a crash between Max Verstappen and Romain Grosjean at turn one on lap 64 caused a "Virtual Safety Car" condition – officially used in Formula One for the first time – which was then quickly replaced by the normal safety car. Having held a lead in excess of 20 seconds beforehand, Hamilton was pitted under the safety car apparently with the intention of returning him to the track ahead of his pursuers. The Mercedes pitwall crew, however, miscalculated the gap allowing Rosberg to take the lead while Hamilton emerged from the pit exit lane marginally behind Vettel who had stayed out under the safety car behind Rosberg. With the safety car coming into the pits on lap 70 of 78, Rosberg retained the lead unchallenged, going on to win the race for the third consecutive year whereas Hamilton finished third, unable to overtake Vettel for second position.

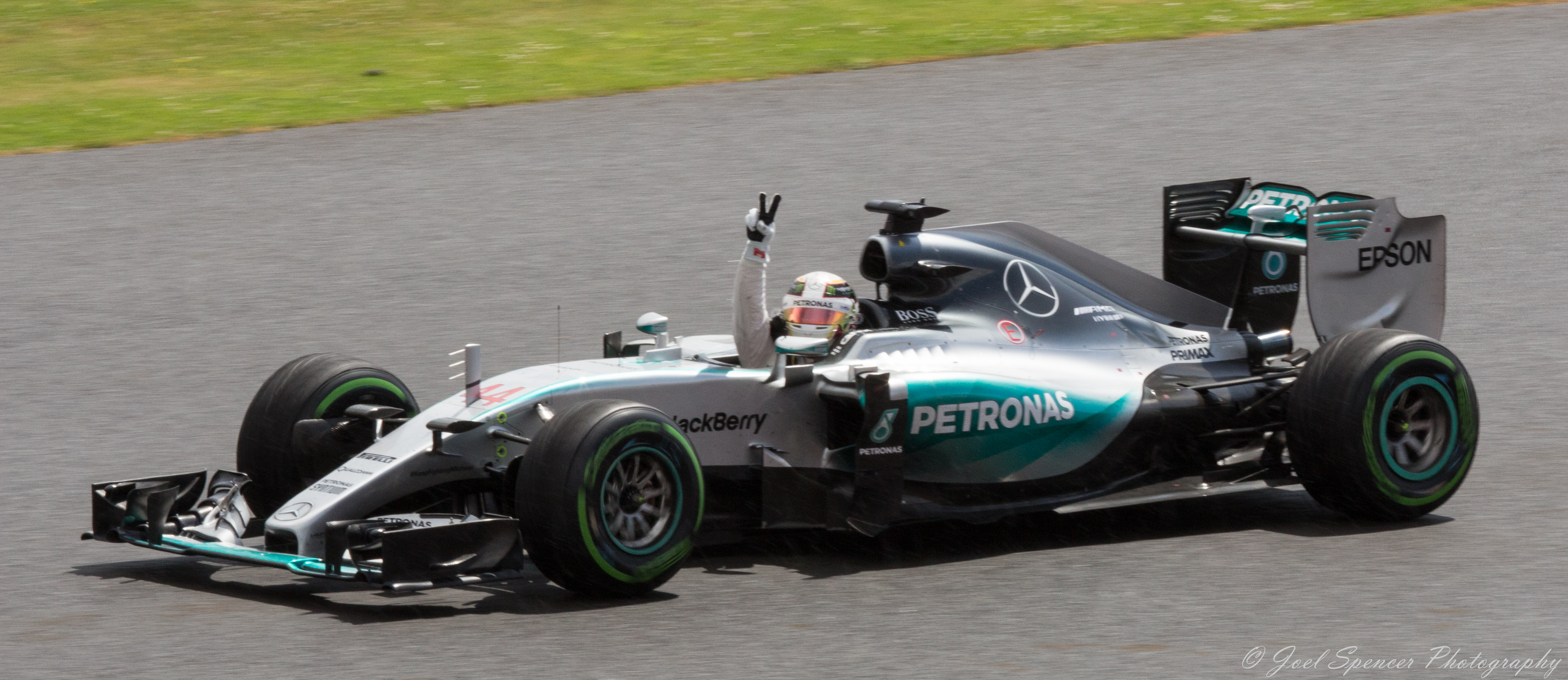
Hamilton won his home race, the British Grand Prix, marking his third victory at Silverstone Circuit.

After the disappointment of Monaco, Mercedes quickly put to rest the criticism, with another 1–2 finish led by pole-sitter Hamilton at the Canadian Grand Prix. At the 8th round, the Austrian Grand Prix, Hamilton took his 7th pole position of the season. In the race, Rosberg had a better start than Hamilton and he eventually led Hamilton to record another 1–2 finish. At the British Grand Prix, the two Mercedes cars qualified 1–2 for the 7th time in 9 races, with Hamilton taking his 8th pole. In the race, both Mercedes cars suffered poorer starts compared to both Williams cars of Felipe Massa and Valtteri Bottas. Massa surged through to lead into Abbey, with Bottas moving ahead of Rosberg and challenging Hamilton for second. At the first pit-stop phase, Hamilton pitted early and was able to use the "undercut" to pass Massa for first position. As the race continued, light rain came on at lap 35 and both Williams drivers struggled in the wet; thus Rosberg got past Bottas at Maggotts on lap 39. In the end, both Mercedes cars moved clear of the field and took their sixth 1–2 finish of the season. At the Hungarian Grand Prix, Hamilton took his 9th pole of the season with Rosberg 2nd – the team's 7th front row lockout of the season. In the race, both Mercedes cars made poor starts and after a difficult race, Hamilton was given a drive through penalty and ended up finishing 6th while Rosberg suffered from a late puncture from contact with Daniel Ricciardo and finished in 8th place, ending Mercedes's run of 9 consecutive double podiums and 28 consecutive races with a podium finish.

After the summer break, Hamilton took pole position for the Belgian Grand Prix, ahead of teammate Rosberg by almost half a second, securing the 2015 FIA pole position trophy in the process with 10 pole positions out of 19 races on the calendar. In the race, Hamilton started well but Rosberg lost position due to wheel spin as new starting procedures were being introduced and enforced. As the race continued, a controlled drive saw Hamilton beat teammate Rosberg by 2 seconds, finishing the race with a 1–2. Hamilton claimed his second career 'grand slam' – pole position, fastest lap, led every lap and win, at the Italian Grand Prix. He also set the fastest lap times in all three practice sessions and all three segments of qualifying. Rosberg had a failure of a component which contaminated his new specification engine before the start of the qualifying, forcing him to run a power unit which had already competed in five race weekends from Canadian Grand Prix to Belgian Grand Prix. The power loss from the age of the engine cost him a front row grid slot in qualifying thus Rosberg had to settle for 4th. He was forced to retire in the closing stages of the race due to a failure of the engine.

=== Non-European rounds ===
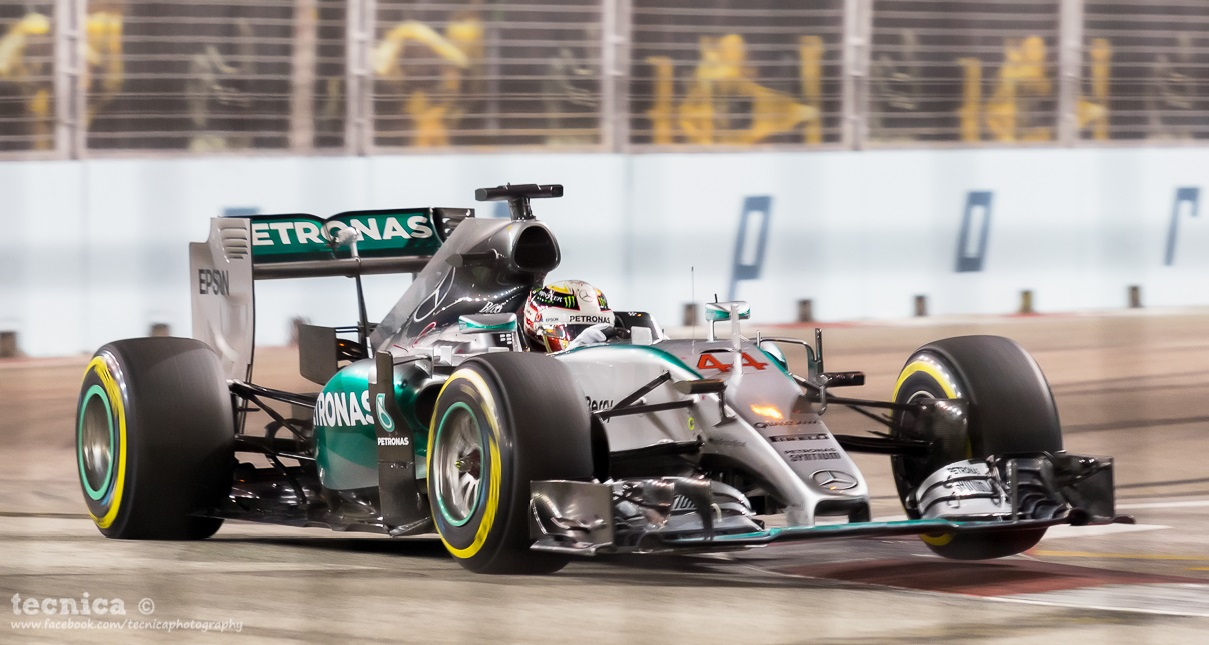
Mercedes endured their weakest weekend of the season at Singapore.

Coming to the Singapore Grand Prix, both Mercedes struggled to be at the forefront as the cars do not suit the track, therefore performance and times slumped as a result. Hamilton and Rosberg could only qualify 5th and 6th respectively. In the race, Hamilton recorded his first retirement of the season and Rosberg finished 4th. At the 14th round of the season – Japanese Grand Prix, Mercedes was back on form during qualifying by locking out the 10th front-row of the season. In the race, Hamilton got the better start and forced Rosberg wide at turn 2 dropping him to fourth place at the end of the first lap. Hamilton dominated the race, leading every lap and setting the fastest lap whereas Rosberg recovered to second, 19s adrift of his teammate, securing Mercedes's 8th 1–2 finish of the season. During the Russian Grand Prix, pole-sitter Rosberg was forced to retire in the early stages of the race owing to throttle pedal damper failure causing blockage on the throttle control. On the other hand, Hamilton qualified 2nd and eased to victory by 6 seconds, ahead of Ferrari's Sebastian Vettel, clinching Mercedes a 2nd successive World Constructors' Championship.

At the United States Grand Prix, Rosberg secured his third consecutive pole position, ahead of Hamilton as inclement weather disrupted the third part of qualifying, as a result using the times in Q2 to determine the grid. During the race, Hamilton got away better at the start, entering the first corner alongside his pole-sitter teammate; Hamilton braked late thus forcing his teammate to go wide. As a result, Hamilton took the lead and Rosberg lost additional positions, dropping to fifth exiting turn one. On lap 18, Rosberg moved ahead of Hamilton, who was the first of the front runners to change tyres at the end of the lap, going for a dry compound. But on lap 48, Rosberg lost the lead to Hamilton after sliding off track due to wheelspin in his rear tyres. Hamilton soon opened up a gap to his teammate and crossed the line as race winner, in addition earning his third World Drivers' Championship.

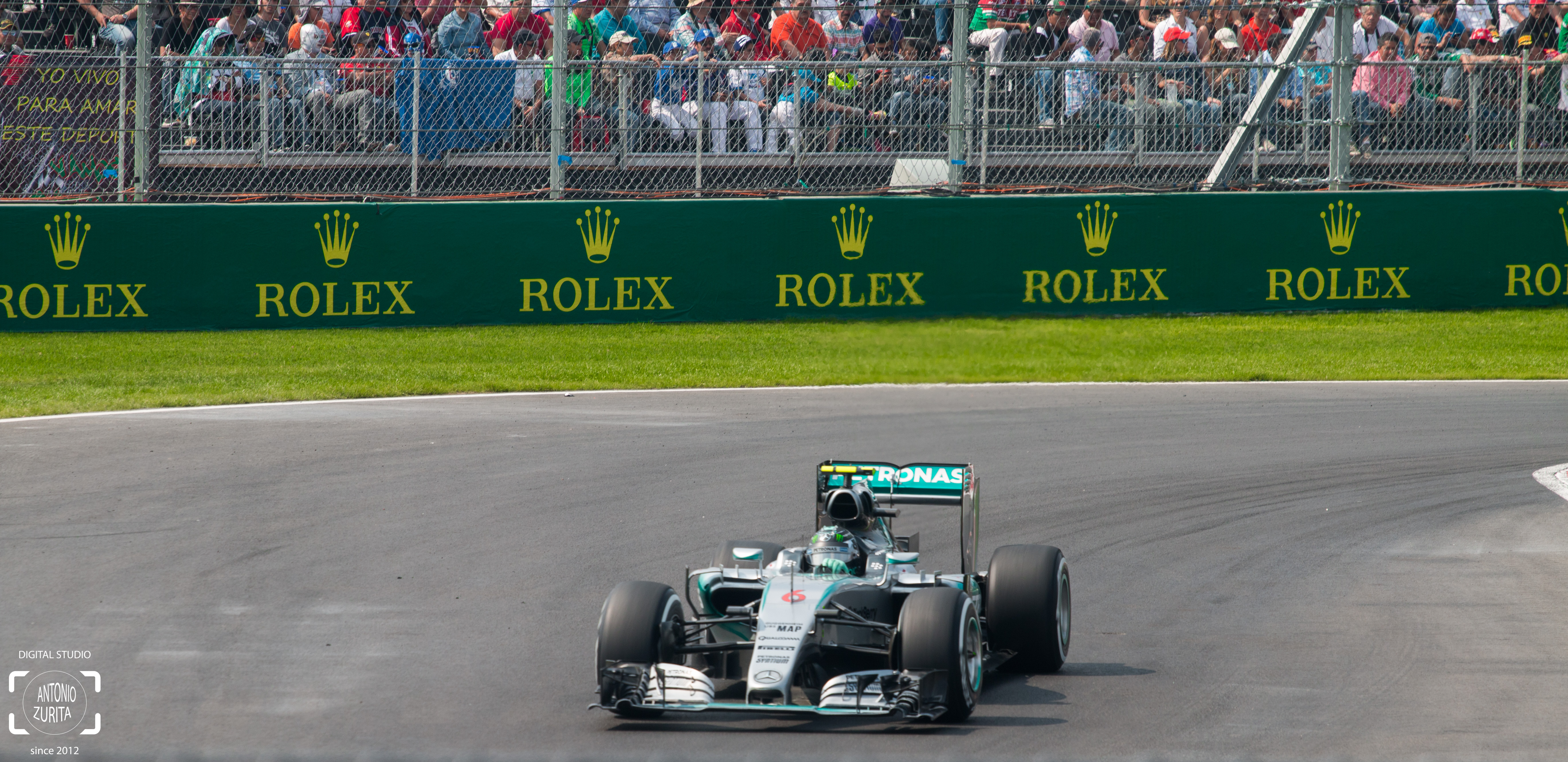
Rosberg won the last three races of the season, starting with the Mexican Grand Prix.

At the Mexican Grand Prix, Rosberg took his fourth consecutive pole with Hamilton second, securing Mercedes's record thirteenth front row lockout of the season. Rosberg controlled the race and was always able to keep Hamilton at bay across the 71 laps securing his first win since the Austrian Grand Prix four months earlier, with Hamilton coming home second to give Mercedes their tenth 1–2 finish of the season. Rosberg also took the fastest lap of the race, to claim his first career hat-trick.

On to the penultimate race of 2015 in Brazil, Rosberg beat Hamilton to pole by eight hundredths of a second and led Hamilton to the chequered flag securing the team's eleventh one-two finish of the season. At the final round in Abu Dhabi, Rosberg beat Hamilton to pole once again to claim his sixth successive pole position and his seventh pole of the season overall and securing the team's fifteenth front-row lockout of the season, the most for any constructor in a single season in the history of Formula One. At the race, Rosberg led Hamilton to the flag to claim his third straight win and sixth win overall in the season and also securing the team's twelfth one-two finish, the most for any constructor in a single season in the history of Formula One, beating the previous record of eleven one-two finishes set by its predecessor the previous season. The team finished the season with 703 points, breaking their own record of 701 points set the previous season for most constructor points in a single season.

== Formula One records ==
As of December 2024, the F1 W06 Hybrid holds the following Formula One records:

- Highest percentage of points in a season: 86.04% (703 Championship Points out of 817 Championship Points)
- Highest percentage of podiums in a season: 84.21% (32 podiums out of 38 entries)
- Most 1–2 finishes in a season with highest percentage: 12 1–2 finishes (63.15%)
- Most front-row lockouts in a season with highest percentage: 15 front-row lockouts (78.94%)
- Most consecutive races with both cars on the podium in a season: 9 consecutive races (2015 Australian Grand Prix – 2015 British Grand Prix)

The car initially also held the record for most championship points in a season (703 points), most wins in a season (16 wins), most pole positions in a season with highest percentage (18 pole positions, 94.7%) and most podiums in a season (32 podiums). However those records were all broken the following year by its highly successful successor – the Mercedes F1 W07 Hybrid.

== Livery ==
In Hungary, the team paid tribute to Jules Bianchi with "#JB17" present on the nosecone.

== Complete Formula One results ==
(key) (results in bold indicate pole position; results in italics indicate fastest lap)

Year	Entrant	Engine	Tyres	Drivers	Grands Prix																			Points	WCC
Year	Entrant	Engine	Tyres	Drivers	AUS	MAL	CHN	BHR	ESP	MON	CAN	AUT	GBR	HUN	BEL	ITA	SIN	JPN	RUS	USA	MEX	BRA	ABU	Points	WCC
2015	Mercedes AMG; Petronas F1 Team	Mercedes-Benz; PU106B Hybrid	**P**	Nico Rosberg	2	3	2	3	**1**	1	2	1	2	8	2	17^{†}	4	**2**	**Ret**	**2**	**1**	**1**	**1**	**703**	**1st**
2015	Mercedes AMG; Petronas F1 Team	Mercedes-Benz; PU106B Hybrid	**P**	Lewis Hamilton	**1**	**2**	**1**	**1**	2	**3**	**1**	**2**	**1**	**6**	**1**	**1**	Ret	1	1	1	2	2	2	**703**	**1st**

^{†} Driver failed to finish the race, but was classified as he had completed greater than 90% of the race distance.

Awards
Preceded by Mercedes F1 W05 Hybrid	Autosport; Racing Car Of The Year; 2015	Succeeded by Mercedes F1 W07 Hybrid
