= Mercedes W14 =

2023 Formula One racing car

Mercedes-AMG F1 W14 E Performance
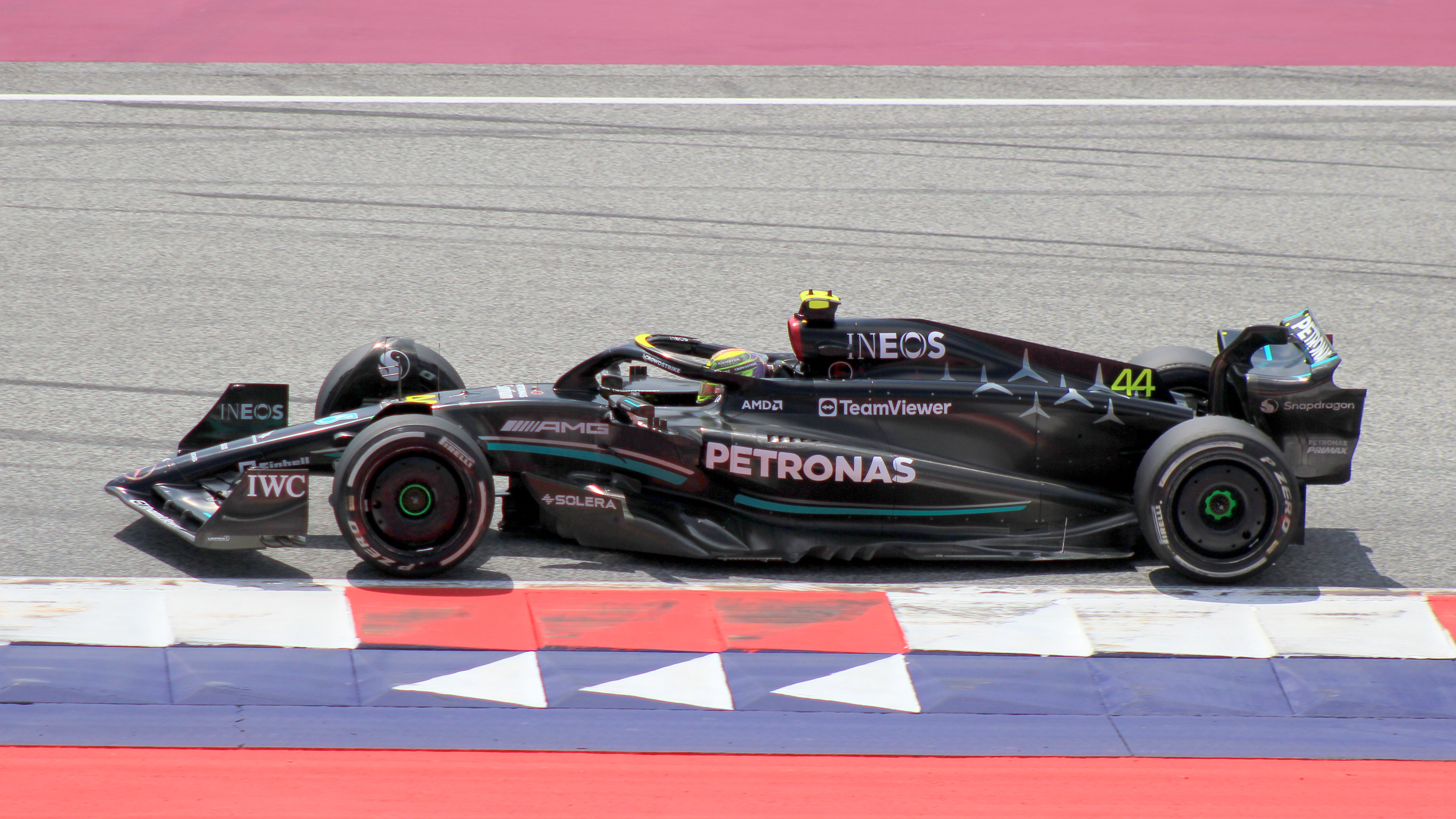
- Lewis Hamilton driving a W14 during the Austrian Grand Prix.
- Category: Formula One
- Constructor: Mercedes-AMG Petronas Formula One Team
- Designers: James Allison (Chief Technical Officer); Mike Elliott (Technical Director); John Owen (Chief Designer); Jarrod Murphy (Aerodynamics Director); Loïc Serra (Performance Director); Ashley Way (Deputy Chief Designer); Giacomo Tortora (Deputy Chief Designer); Emiliano Giangiulio (Head of Vehicle Performance); Gioacchino Vino (Chief Aerodynamicist) Hywel Thomas (Managing Director - Power Unit) Lorenzo Sassi (Engineering Director - Power Unit)
- Predecessor: Mercedes W13
- Successor: Mercedes W15

Technical specifications
- Chassis: Moulded carbon fibre and honeycomb composite structure with FIA safety structures
- Suspension (front): Carbon fibre wishbone and pushrod-activated springs and dampers
- Suspension (rear): Carbon fibre wishbone and pullrod-activated inboard springs and dampers
- Length: over 5,000 mm (197 in)
- Width: 2,000 mm (79 in)
- Height: 950 mm (37 in)
- Wheelbase: under 3,600 mm (142 in)
- Engine: Mercedes-AMG F1 M14 E Performance 1.6 L (98 cu in) direct injection V6 turbocharged engine limited to 15,000 RPM in a mid-mounted, rear-wheel drive layout
- Electric motor: Motor Generator Unit Kinetic (MGU-K) and thermal energy recovery systems
- Transmission: Mercedes co-developed with Xtrac 8-speed hydraulic actuated semi automatic sequential gearbox, + 1 reverse gear
- Weight: 789 kg (1,739 lb)
- Fuel: Petronas Primax
- Lubricants: Petronas Tutela
- Brakes: Brembo carbon discs and pads with rear brake-by-wire system
- Tyres: Pirelli P Zero (Dry/Slick); Pirelli Cinturato (Wet/Treaded); with OZ forged magnesium wheels: 18"
- Clutch: ZF carbon fibre reinforced carbon plate

Competition history
- Notable entrants: Mercedes-AMG Petronas Formula One Team
- Notable drivers: 44. (United Kingdom) Lewis Hamilton; 63. (United Kingdom) George Russell
- Debut: 2023 Bahrain Grand Prix
- Last event: 2023 Abu Dhabi Grand Prix
Races	Wins	Podiums	Poles	F/Laps
22	0	8	1	5

The Mercedes-AMG F1 W14 E Performance, commonly referred to as the Mercedes W14, is a Formula One racing car designed and constructed by the Mercedes-AMG Petronas Formula One Team that competed in the 2023 Formula One World Championship. The W14 was driven by 7-time Formula One World Champion Lewis Hamilton and George Russell, who completed his second full season with the team. The W14 became Mercedes' first winless car since 2011's MGP W02.

== Season summary ==
=== Early design and opening rounds ===
Team Principal Toto Wolff claimed that the W14 would have "different DNA" from the W14's predecessor, the Mercedes W13, after a challenging 2022 campaign that had seen them out of the World Championship battle. The W14 was designed with a higher ride height with the aim to reduce porpoising. The car, however, proved to be less competitive than expected at the start of the season, causing key figures in the Mercedes team to question the effectiveness of the car's concept.

At the launch, held on 15 February 2023, the W14 was revealed to have a black livery, much like its predecessors, the Mercedes F1 W11 of 2020 and the W12 of 2021, but unlike those aforementioned cars, the black livery on the car is not being primarily used to promote diversity, but to save weight after the team admitted to struggling with excess weight with its 2022 car, the W13, which had a traditional silver-painted livery. The black colour was created by leaving some parts as unpainted raw carbon whilst others are painted matte black.

In Bahrain, the season opener of 2023, Russell out-qualified teammate Hamilton by starting 6th, while the latter qualified 7th. In the opening laps, Hamilton was already in 5th place and would finish the race in that position, while Russell inherited Hamilton's starting position with the Aston Martin car of Lance Stroll separating them. In Saudi Arabia, Mercedes had a mixed qualifying session with Russell qualified 4th, while Hamilton qualified in a frustrating 8th place. During the race, Hamilton would finish in 5th, while Russell finished 4th. In Australia, the W14 looked to be competitive around Albert Park with Russell and Hamilton achieving 2nd and 3rd in qualifying. During the race, Russell made an excellent start and inherits the lead from Verstappen, hanging on to it until lap 6 until he pitted with teammate Hamilton inheriting the lead. Verstappen would eventually overtake Hamilton for the lead on lap 12. Russell's race was cut short with a powertrain problem as he retired from the race on lap 18. Hamilton eventually finished the race in 2nd place, achieving W14 and the team's first podium finish of the season. Both Mercedes drivers would finish on the points for the next two races in Azerbaijan and Miami. But neither of the drivers finished on the podium in the aforementioned races.

=== Mid-season: Introducing sidepods ===
After struggling to match the frontrunning pace of Red Bull Racing and Aston Martin in the first five rounds of the season a major upgrade package was introduced for the Monaco Grand Prix, the team having initially planned to run the upgrades for the first time at the Emilia Romagna Grand Prix at Imola – but this race was ultimately cancelled due to flooding in the Emilia Romagna region. The upgrades would make their debut as planned at the Monaco Grand Prix; the biggest change within the upgrade reintroduced the sidepods ditched on the previous season's car. The following weekend at the Spanish Grand Prix, the car achieved its first double podium finish with Hamilton finishing in 2nd and Russell in 3rd, after the latter recovered from 12th. On 7 June, the team's reserve driver, Mick Schumacher drove the W14 for Pirelli tyre test at the Circuit de Barcelona-Catalunya.

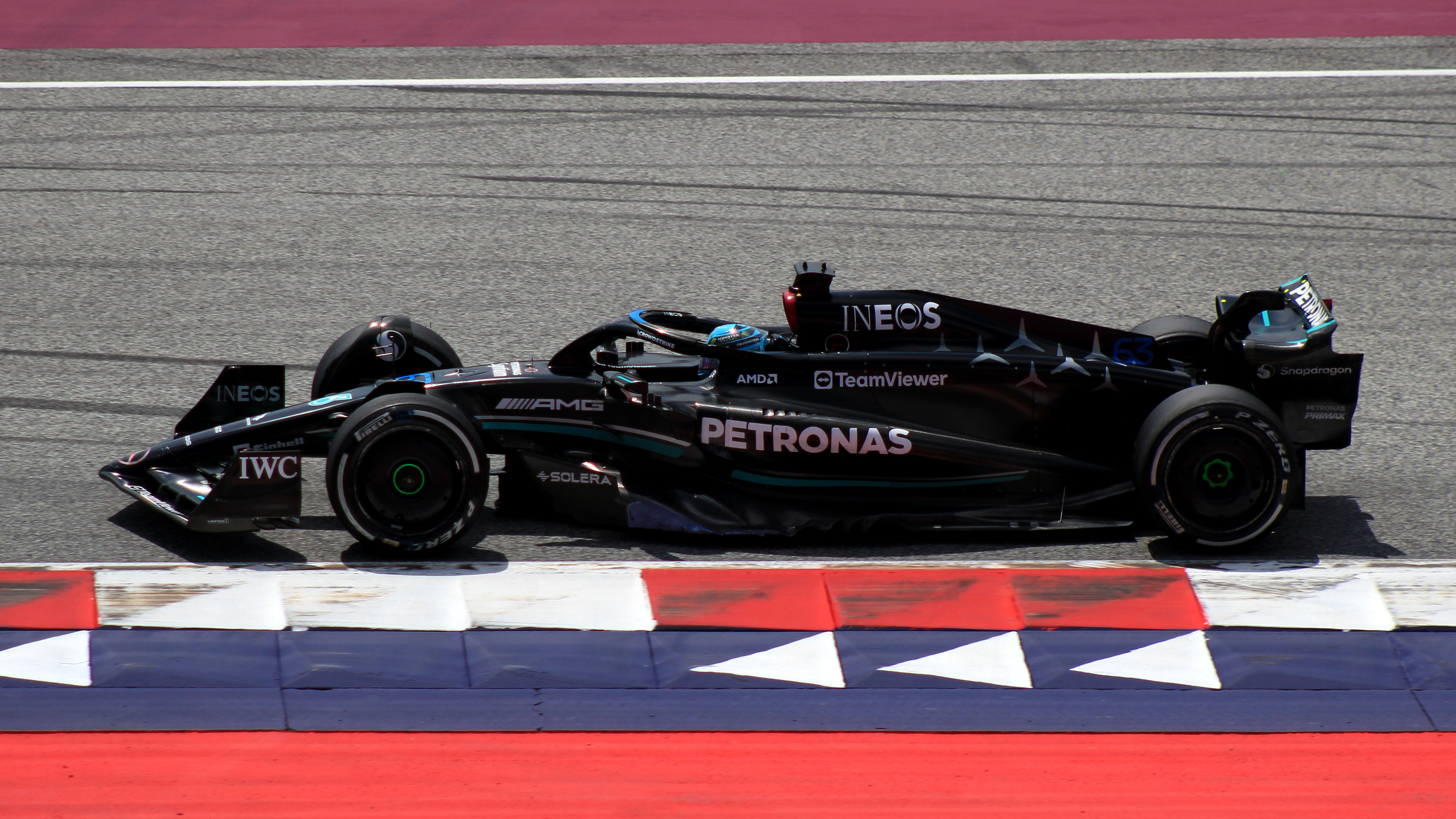
Russell driving the W14 at the Austrian Grand Prix, where he finished 7th

In Canada, Hamilton continued his podium finish streak by finishing 3rd, while Russell had to retire. In Austria, the Mercedes duo endured a difficult weekend with Russell finishing 7th, and Hamilton in 8th after being handed a 10-second time penalty for exceeding track limits by the stewards. Hamilton could be found frustrated with the W14 apparent lack of performance. Toto Wolff, Mercedes' Team Principal who rarely spoke to the drivers during the race promptly told Hamilton on the radio that "the car is bad, please drive it."

However, the Mercedes duo bounced back in their home turf in the British Grand Prix, with Hamilton again finishing 3rd and Russell in 5th. On 22 July, the W14 achieved its first (and only) pole position of the season – and Lewis Hamilton's first since the 2021 Saudi Arabian Grand Prix – at the Hungarian Grand Prix. However during the race, Hamilton immediately lost out on the lead to Verstappen. He would end up finishing outside the podium in 4th, while Russell finished in 6th. Belgium was the last race before the season headed into summer break. The Mercedes duo had a repeat of their results from Hungary, with Hamilton and Russell once again finishing 4th and 6th.

=== Post-summer break ===
After the summer break, the season resumed with the Dutch Grand Prix in Zandvoort. George Russell qualified 3rd. However, Hamilton was knocked out in Q2 after being impeded by Yuki Tsunoda of AlphaTauri, meaning he started the race from 13th on the grid. During the race itself, Mercedes made the fatal mistake of staying out too long on the slicks, while it started to rain. In the end, Hamilton recovered from 13th to finish in 6th, while Russell finished in a frustrating 17th place. Team principal Wolff, labeled the strategy they made as "catastrophic."

A week later in Italy, Hamilton was outqualified by Russell who started 4th, while Hamilton himself started in 8th. During the race, both Mercedes drivers were penalized by the stewards who awarded both of them with five-second time penalties: Russell for skipping the first chicane after rejoining the track from his pit stop, and Hamilton for his collision with the McLaren of Oscar Piastri. They ended up finishing the race with Russell in 5th, and Hamilton in 6th.

In Singapore, the Mercedes cars were proven to be competitive around the streets of Marina Bay. Russell out-qualified Hamilton for the 3rd consecutive time, with the former starting from 2nd, while the latter starts from 5th. With the Red Bull cars starting further down on the grid, the Mercedes cars continue to pile pressure on Lando Norris in the McLaren and the race leader, Carlos Sainz in the Ferrari for the majority of the race. Mid-way through the race, Mercedes opted to pit Russell and Hamilton for fresh medium tires after a late VSC caused by Esteban Ocon who retired due to a gearbox issue. However, on the last lap, Russell crashed out from 3rd and ended his race on the barriers in Turn 10. Hamilton inherited the 3rd position and joined Sainz and Norris on the podium. Russell attributed that a "millimeter lapse of concentration cost the team's potential first victory of the season."

In Japan, both Mercedes drivers were looking to replicate their strong performance in Singapore, but both cars could only lock out the fourth row, with 7th placed Hamilton over a second off the pole-sitter, Verstappen. Hamilton cited the concept of the W14 as the reason why the team struggled massively in qualifying. During the race, team orders were implemented after Hamilton and Russell almost collided to one another, the team instructed Russell to let Hamilton by. Hamilton ended up finishing 5th, with Russell finishing 7th.

=== Closing rounds: Qatar to Abu Dhabi ===
In Qatar, Russell and Hamilton qualified 2nd and 3rd in qualifying for Sunday's main race. For the sprint shootout session, Russell qualified 4th, while Hamilton endured a difficult session, starting from 12th for the sprint race. For the sprint race itself, Hamilton made the most from the incident involving Esteban Ocon, Sergio Pérez, Nico Hülkenberg and climbed up to 5th after starting from 12th to finish behind teammate Russell in 4th. During the main race, Hamilton attempted to go around the outside of his teammate but crashed into each other in the first corner in lap 1, effectively ending Hamilton's race. Russell had to pit for a new front wing in the aftermath of the incident. Russell would recover to finish the race in 4th. Following the incident, Hamilton accepted full responsibility for the crash with Russell. Both drivers claimed the Qatar incident did not damage their relationship.

In the United States Grand Prix, Hamilton finished the main race in 2nd but would be disqualified after the race due to a technical violation in the skid block of his car. This marked the first time Hamilton was disqualified from the final race classification since the 2009 Australian Grand Prix. Russell finished the race in 5th.

In Mexico City, Hamilton outqualified his teammate again by starting 6th, while Russell started from 8th. The race turned much better for the Mercedes team with Hamilton capitalizing on the first lap crash of rival Sergio Pérez from Red Bull to finish the race in 2nd. Russell finished the race in 6th.

Coming to São Paulo, the Mercedes team were optimistic about their chance to win in the Brazilian soil again like last season where Russell took his maiden victory. Russell finished the sprint race in 4th, while Hamilton finished 7th. During the main race, things turned much worse for the Mercedes drivers. Russell had to retire his car due to an oil temperature issue. Hamilton on the other hand struggled with the lack of the pace in his car and finished in a frustrating 8th place. Team Principal Wolff would later say that the W14 "doesn't deserve a win", after the shocking drop of performance from the very same car that finished second the week prior.

In the inaugural Las Vegas Grand Prix, Hamilton originally qualified in 11th before being later promoted to 10th due to a penalty imposed on Sainz. Hamilton could be heard complaining on the radio that "there's nothing left in the car." Russell had a much better qualifying by setting the 4th best lap. The race would be another difficult outing for the team. Russell who had a competitive race in most of the race collided with Verstappen and later received a 5-second penalty for causing the collision. Russell took responsibility for causing the crash but was visibly disappointed as it could have been an easy podium finish. The poor result for Russell meant he was forced to settle for 8th in the Drivers' Championship, the lowest position for a Mercedes driver since Nico Rosberg finished 9th in 2012. Hamilton meanwhile had a comeback after colliding with the McLaren of Oscar Piastri that sent him tumbling to 19th, but Hamilton would later finish the race in 7th. After the race, Hamilton claimed the race was great and proved the critics wrong. However, with rival Pérez finishing 3rd, Hamilton was now out of contention to finish 2nd in the Drivers' Championship, but due to the poor results from his closest rivals Fernando Alonso and Lando Norris, he mathematically secured third place in the championship for the first time in his career. With Charles Leclerc finishing 2nd, Mercedes hold a slim 4-point lead over Ferrari on the 2nd place of the Constructors' Championship.

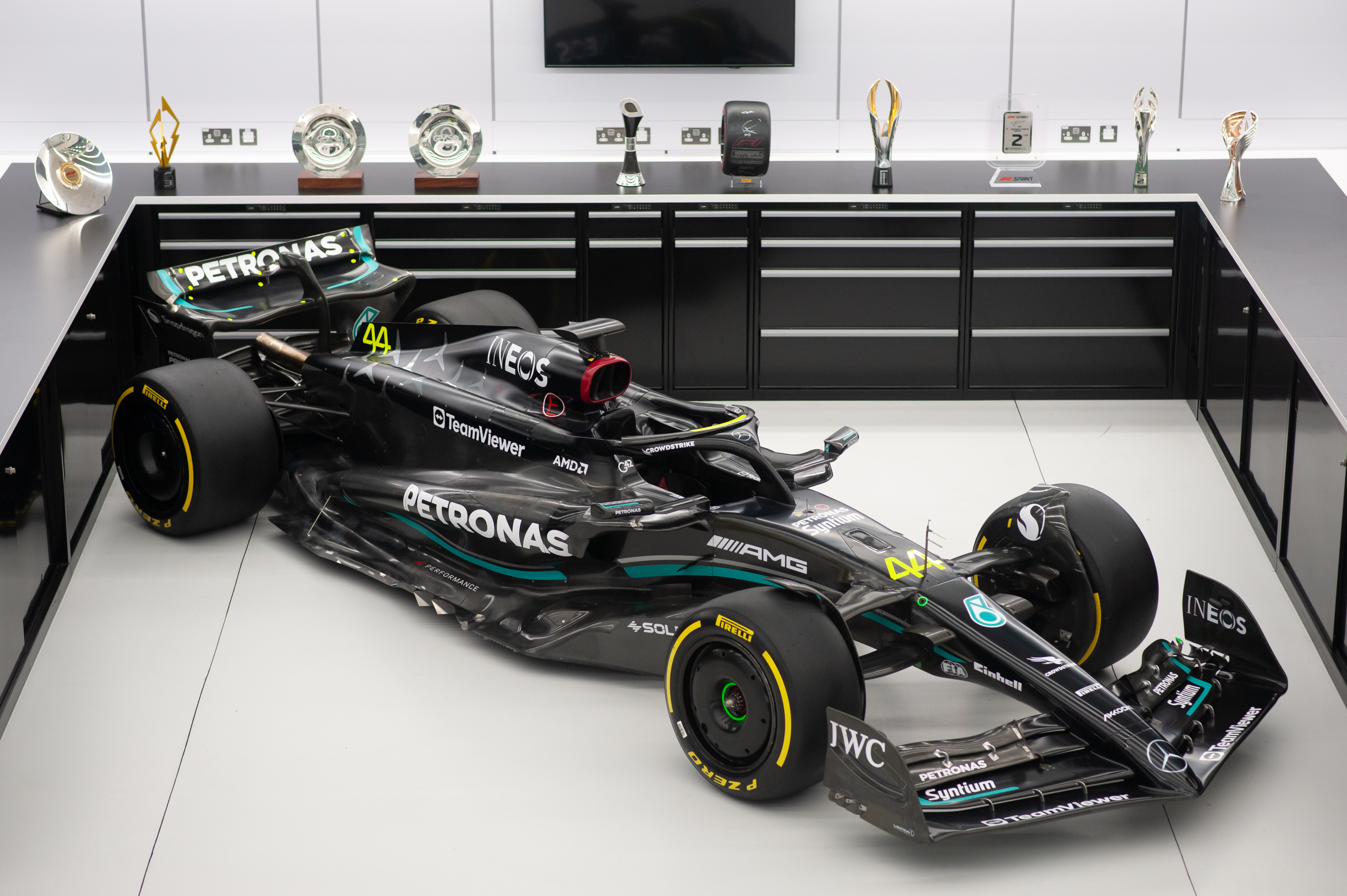
Hamilton's W14 with the trophies it acquired throughout the season

Going to the season finale in 2023 Abu Dhabi Grand Prix, Mercedes held a very slim 4-point lead over Ferrari in the Constructors' Championship. In FP1, Mercedes' junior driver, Frederik Vesti deputized for Lewis Hamilton for this session. The battle for second in the Constructors' started on a backfoot for Mercedes with Leclerc started 2nd while Russell started 4th. Elsewhere, their respective teammates Sainz (16th) and Hamilton (11th) are unable to make it to Q3. During the race, Pérez was awarded a 5-second time penalty after the stewards deemed he was at fault in the incident with Norris. In the closing laps, Leclerc let Pérez by hoping that he could nullify his penalty by being 5 seconds ahead of Russell to swing the second place in the Constructors' for Ferrari. However, Leclerc's plan didn't work as Pérez was 1.1 seconds short, meaning the Mexican finished outside the podium. Russell and Hamilton came home in 3rd and 9th to seal second place in the Constructors' Championship for Mercedes, just 3 points ahead of Ferrari. Russell capped off his difficult season with a second podium finish despite claiming that "Lady Luck" might be on Mercedes' side on the race thanks to Pérez's penalty.

Following the conclusion of the Abu Dhabi Grand Prix, the W14 became Mercedes' first car since the W02 (2011) that failed to win a single race during the season.

== Complete Formula One results ==
Key

Key
Colour	Result
Gold	Winner
Silver	Second place
Bronze	Third place
Green	Other points position
Blue	Other classified position
Blue	Not classified, finished (NC)
Purple	Not classified, retired (Ret)
Red	Did not qualify (DNQ)
Black	Disqualified (DSQ)
White	Did not start (DNS)
White	Race cancelled (C)
Blank	Did not practice (DNP)
Blank	Excluded (EX)
Blank	Did not arrive (DNA)
Blank	Withdrawn (WD)
Blank	Did not enter (empty cell)
Annotation	Meaning
P	Pole position
F	Fastest lap
Superscript number	Points-scoring position in sprint

Year	Entrant	Power unit	Tyres	Driver name	Grands Prix																						Points	WCC pos.
Year	Entrant	Power unit	Tyres	Driver name	BHR	SAU	AUS	AZE	MIA	MON	ESP	CAN	AUT	GBR	HUN	BEL	NED	ITA	SIN	JPN	QAT	USA	MXC	SAP	LVG	ABU	Points	WCC pos.
2023	Mercedes-AMG Petronas F1 Team	Mercedes-AMG F1 M14	P	(United Kingdom) Lewis Hamilton	5	5	2	6^{7}	6	4^{F}	2	3	8	3	4^{P}	4^{7 F}	6	6	3^{F}	5	Ret^{5}	DSQ^{2}	2^{F}	8^{7}	7	9	409	2nd
2023	Mercedes-AMG Petronas F1 Team	Mercedes-AMG F1 M14	P	(United Kingdom) George Russell	7	4	Ret	8^{4 F}	4	5	3	Ret	7^{8}	5	6	6^{8}	17	5	16†	7	4^{4}	5^{8}	6	Ret^{4}	8	3	409	2nd
