= Mercedes W13 =

Formula One racing car

Mercedes-AMG W13 E Performance
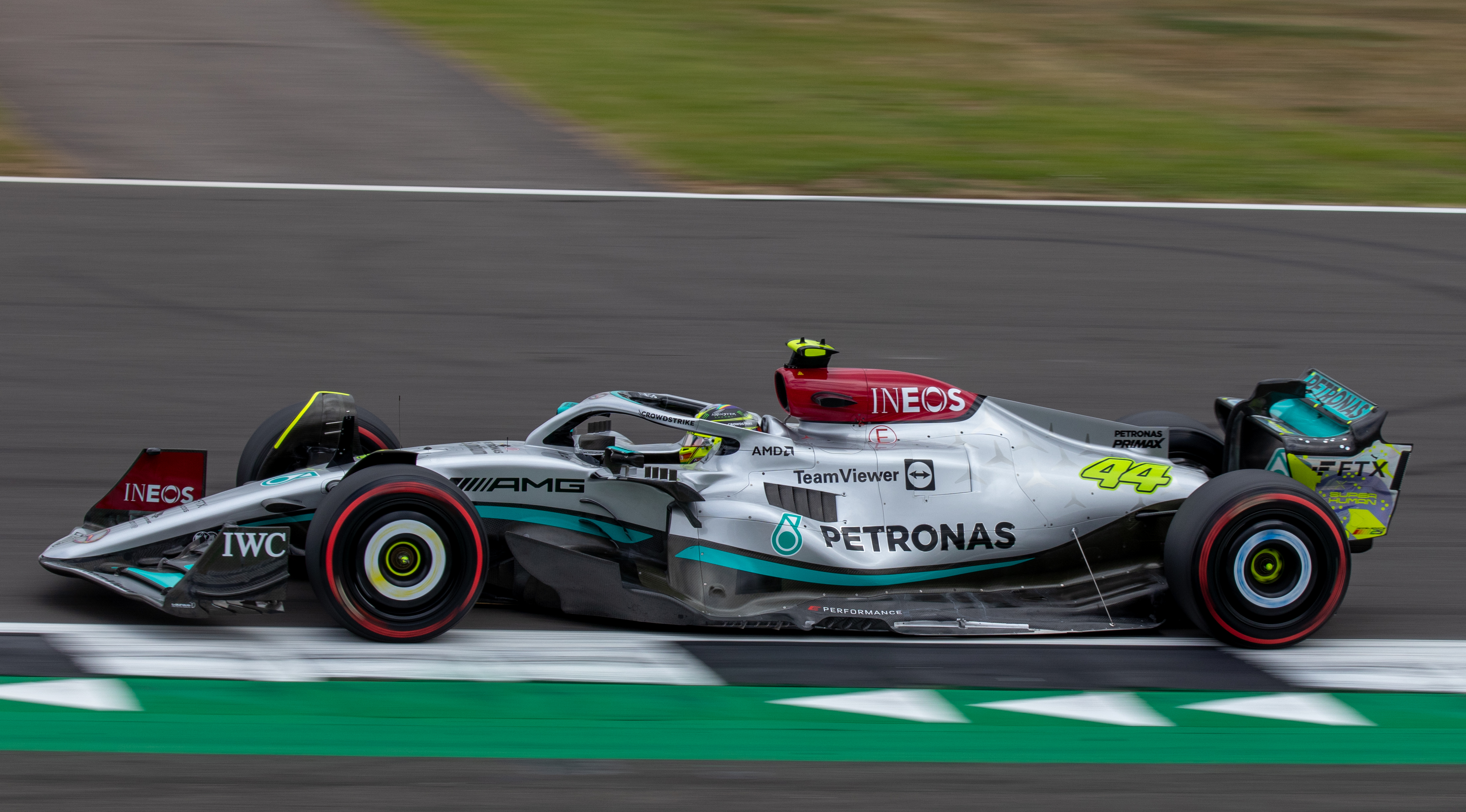
- Lewis Hamilton in the Mercedes-AMG W13 E Performance at the British Grand Prix
- Category: Formula One
- Constructor: Mercedes-AMG Petronas Formula One Team
- Designers: James Allison (Chief Technical Officer); Mike Elliott (Technical Director); John Owen (Chief Designer); Jarrod Murphy (Aerodynamics Director); Loïc Serra (Performance Director); Ashley Way (Deputy Chief Designer); Giacomo Tortora (Deputy Chief Designer); Emiliano Giangiulio (Head of Vehicle Performance); Eric Blandin (Chief Aerodynamicist) Hywel Thomas (Managing Director - Power Unit) Lorenzo Sassi (Engineering Director - Power Unit)
- Predecessor: Mercedes W12
- Successor: Mercedes W14

Technical specifications
- Chassis: Moulded carbon fibre and honeycomb composite structure with FIA safety structures
- Suspension (front): Carbon fiber double wishbone push-rod actuated torsion springs, rockers, and anti-roll bar
- Suspension (rear): Carbon fiber double wishbone pull-rod actuated inboard springs, dampers and anti-roll bar
- Length: over 5,000 mm (197 in)
- Width: 2,000 mm (79 in)
- Height: 970 mm (38 in)
- Wheelbase: under 3,600 mm (142 in)
- Engine: Mercedes-AMG F1 M13 E Performance 1.6 L (98 cu in) direct injection V6 turbocharged engine limited to 15,000 RPM in a mid-mounted, rear-wheel drive layout
- Electric motor: Motor Generator Unit Kinetic (MGU-K) and thermal energy recovery systems
- Transmission: Mercedes co-developed with Xtrac 8-speed hydraulic actuated semi automatic sequential gearbox, + 1 reverse gear
- Power: 770 kW (1,030 hp)
- Weight: 795 kg (1,752.7 lb)
- Fuel: Petronas Primax
- Lubricants: Petronas Tutela
- Brakes: Brembo carbon discs and pads with rear brake-by-wire system
- Tyres: Pirelli P Zero (Dry/Slick); Pirelli Cinturato (Wet/Treaded); with BBS forged magnesium wheels: 18"
- Clutch: ZF carbon fibre reinforced carbon plate

Competition history
- Notable entrants: Mercedes-AMG Petronas Formula One Team
- Notable drivers: 44. (United Kingdom) Lewis Hamilton; 63. (United Kingdom) George Russell
- Debut: 2022 Bahrain Grand Prix
- First win: 2022 São Paulo Grand Prix
- Last win: 2022 São Paulo Grand Prix
- Last event: 2022 Abu Dhabi Grand Prix
Races	Wins	Podiums	Poles	F/Laps
22	1	17	1	6

The Mercedes-AMG F1 W13 E Performance, commonly known as the Mercedes W13, is a Formula One racing car designed and constructed by the Mercedes-AMG Petronas Formula One Team to compete in the 2022 Formula One World Championship.

The car was driven by Lewis Hamilton and George Russell, the latter racing his first season with the team. The team’s reserve driver was Nyck de Vries, who usually drove in Formula E for the Mercedes-EQ Formula E Team. The chassis was Mercedes's first car built for the new ground effect technical regulations introduced in 2022, and the first Mercedes car not to win the World Constructors' Championship since 2013.

== Launch and pre-season testing ==
The Mercedes AMG F1 W13, with the exception of the car's drivetrain, was an all new car designed to conform to the new FIA regulations in effect as of 2022. The car was officially unveiled at the Silverstone Circuit with Hamilton and Russell completing an inaugural shakedown on 18 February 2022. The car took part the pre-season testing 1 at Circuit de Barcelona-Catalunya on 23 February – 25 February. During the three testing days, the car completed 392 laps; a total of 1,832 km (1,138 mi), which equivalent close to 6 race distances. The car then took part in the second pre-season test at the Bahrain International Circuit on 10 March – 12 March. During the three testing days, the car completed 384 laps, a total of 2,078 km (1,291 mi), equivalent to 6.7 race distances. Both tests showed that the car appeared to be suffering handling and balance problems partly due to excessive porpoising, with Hamilton writing off the team's chances of winning the first race of the season. The W13 underwent a significant change with an almost sidepod-less design. This design was used throughout the Bahrain test and became the primary design for the team. Red Bull team principal, Christian Horner, was initially quoted as saying that the design was not "to the spirit of the regulations." A Red Bull spokesperson later said this was incorrect, stating that "no official comment" had been made by the team. From a new turbocharger and fuel management system, Mercedes managed to increase 20 more horsepower from the new M13 E Performance power unit, resulting in a total maximum power output of 770 kW (1,030 hp). The car finished first and second in the third session of testing with Lewis Hamilton setting the fastest time of a 1.19.138. This was the fastest time of all three testing sessions.

=== Livery ===
The W13 saw the return of the traditional silver livery, after the W11 and W12 were painted black in support of the Black Lives Matter movement, though the drivers continued to race in black overalls.

The W13 was set to run in a special "Red Pig" livery at the Belgian Grand Prix to celebrate 55 years of Mercedes-AMG, the livery itself was a half-and-half paint job, inspired by the 1971 24 hours of Spa class winning Mercedes-AMG "Rote Sau" 300 SEL 6.8 race car. It was to be the first time for Mercedes to compete in a race with a special livery since the 2019 German Grand Prix. But later, Mercedes decided not to use the special livery, due to weight issues and lack of time as three back-to-back races were scheduled for the upcoming three weeks. While the red to silver livery did not materialise, some elements of the livery, including the AMG logos and driver numbers, were present.

== Season summary ==
The W13 proved to be uncompetitive in the early part of the season until Mercedes brought significant upgrades to the car in Spain. Hamilton and Russell were able to finish on the podium when either one of Ferrari's drivers hit trouble, with Russell finishing in the top 5 until Silverstone where he retired on lap 1.

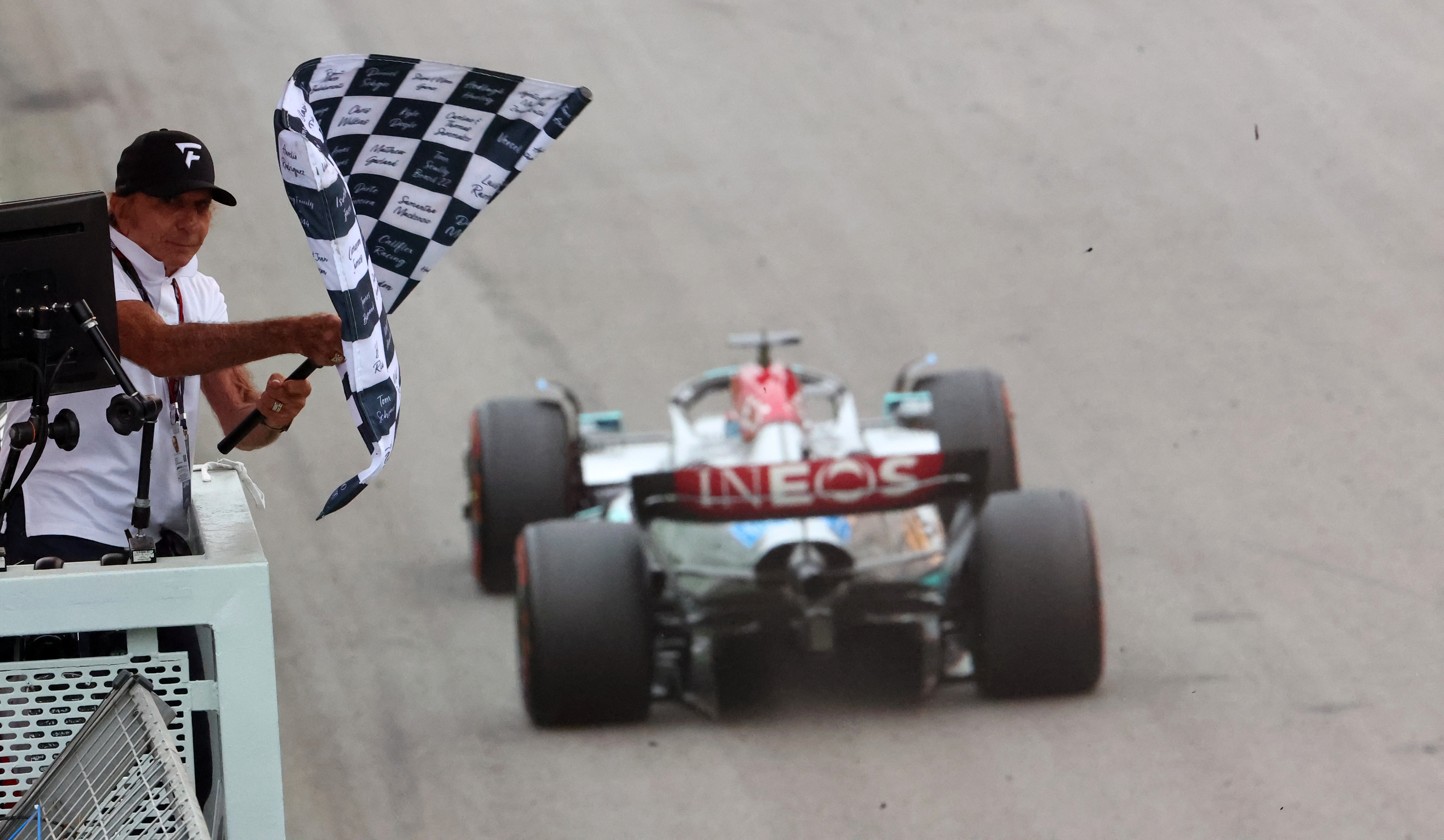
Russell took home his first career victory at the São Paulo Grand Prix

Despite being a less competitive car compared to its predecessors, it was reliable until Hamilton retired in the final race of the season in Abu Dhabi with a hydraulics problem on lap 55. Russell managed to score his first pole position at the Hungarian Grand Prix and his first win at the São Paulo Grand Prix, which was the team's first win since the 2021 Saudi Arabian Grand Prix and their first 1–2 finish since the 2020 Emilia Romagna Grand Prix. This is the first time since 2012 the team had won only one race and qualified on pole once. With Russell's victory in Interlagos, Mercedes' streak of winning at least one race every season was extended to 11 seasons (the third longest in the sport's history as of 2024), stretching all the way back to the Chinese Grand Prix in 2012. The streak came to an end the following season as the team failed to win a single race for the first time since 2011.

The W13 is regarded as one of the worst Mercedes-AMG developed cars to date rivalling the race record of pre turbo-hybrid era Mercedes cars. Toto Wolff, Mercedes-AMG F1 Team Principal, claims that he intends to "put these cars in the reception at Brackley and in Brixworth to remind us every single day how difficult it can be".

== Complete Formula One results ==
Key

Key
Colour	Result
Gold	Winner
Silver	Second place
Bronze	Third place
Green	Other points position
Blue	Other classified position
Blue	Not classified, finished (NC)
Purple	Not classified, retired (Ret)
Red	Did not qualify (DNQ)
Black	Disqualified (DSQ)
White	Did not start (DNS)
White	Race cancelled (C)
Blank	Did not practice (DNP)
Blank	Excluded (EX)
Blank	Did not arrive (DNA)
Blank	Withdrawn (WD)
Blank	Did not enter (empty cell)
Annotation	Meaning
P	Pole position
F	Fastest lap
Superscript number	Points-scoring position in sprint

Year	Entrant	Power unit	Tyres	Driver name	Grands Prix																						Points	WCC pos.
Year	Entrant	Power unit	Tyres	Driver name	BHR	SAU	AUS	EMI	MIA	ESP	MON	AZE	CAN	GBR	AUT	FRA	HUN	BEL	NED	ITA	SIN	JPN	USA	MXC	SAP	ABU	Points	WCC pos.
2022	Mercedes-AMG Petronas F1 Team	Mercedes-AMG F1 M13	P	(United Kingdom) Lewis Hamilton	3	10	4	13	6	5	8	4	3	3^{F}	3^{8}	2	2^{F}	Ret	4	5	9	5	2	2	2^{3}	18†	515	3rd
2022	Mercedes-AMG Petronas F1 Team	Mercedes-AMG F1 M13	P	(United Kingdom) George Russell	4	5	3	4	5	3	5	3	4	Ret	4^{4}	3	3^{P}	4	2	3	14^{F}	8	5^{F}	4^{F}	1^{1 F}	5	515	3rd
