= Mercedes F1 W05 Hybrid =

2014 Formula One racing car

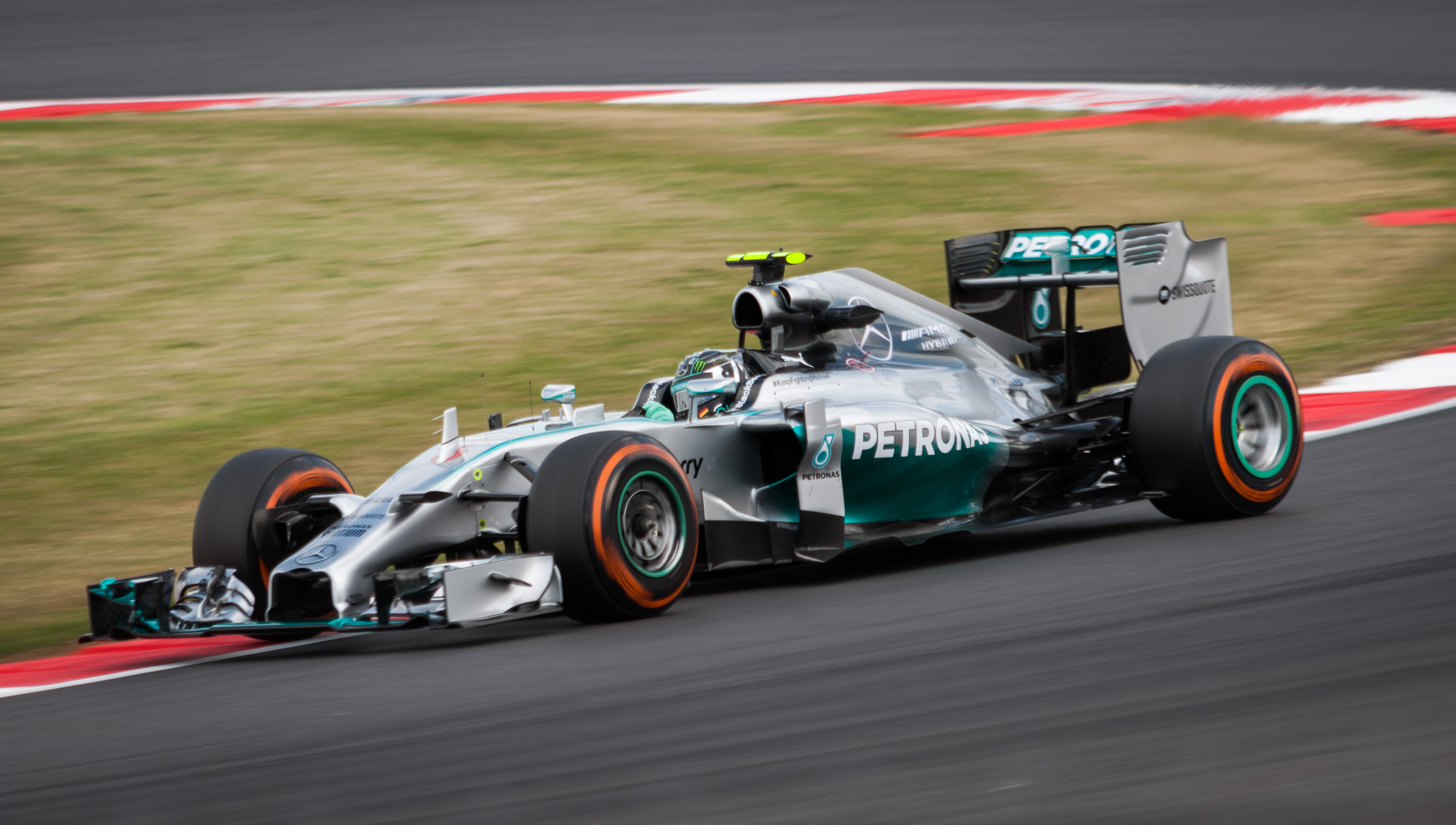
- Nico Rosberg driving the W05 Hybrid at the British Grand Prix
- Category: Formula One
- Constructor: Mercedes
- Designers: Bob Bell (Technical Director); Aldo Costa (Engineering Director); Geoff Willis (Technology Director); John Owen (Chief Designer); Loïc Serra (Chief Vehicle Dynamicist); Russell Cooley (Chief Engineer); Mike Elliott (Head of Aerodynamics); Jarrod Murphy (Chief Aerodynamicist); Andy Cowell (Managing Director - Power Unit); Hywel Thomas (Engineering Director - Power Unit)
- Predecessor: Mercedes F1 W04
- Successor: Mercedes F1 W06 Hybrid

Technical specifications
- Chassis: Moulded carbon fibre & Honeycomb composite structure
- Suspension (front): Carbon fibre wishbone and pushrod activated torsion springs & rockers
- Suspension (rear): Carbon fibre wishbone and pullrod activated torsion springs & rockers
- Length: 4,800 mm (189 in)
- Width: 1,800 mm (71 in)
- Height: 950 mm (37 in)
- Engine: Mercedes-Benz PU106A Hybrid, 1.6 L (98 cu in), 90° - V6 turbocharged engine, limited to 15,000 RPM, in a mid-mounted, rear-wheel drive layout
- Electric motor: Motor Generator Unit–Kinetic (MGU-K), Motor Generator Unit–Heat (MGU-H)
- Transmission: Mercedes co-developed with Xtrac semi-automatic seamless shift sequential gearbox with 8-speed forward and 1 reverse gears
- Battery: Mercedes lithium-ion batteries solution
- Power: 840 horsepower (630 kW)
- Weight: 691 kg (1,523.4 lb)
- Fuel: Petronas Primax
- Lubricants: Petronas Syntium & Tutela
- Brakes: Carbone Industrie carbon brake discs, pads and Brembo brake calipers with rear brake-by-wire
- Tyres: Pirelli P Zero (Dry/Slick); Pirelli Cinturato (Wet/Treaded); Advanti forged magnesium wheels: 13"
- Clutch: Carbon fibre reinforced carbon plate

Competition history
- Notable entrants: Mercedes AMG Petronas F1 Team
- Notable drivers: 6. (Germany) Nico Rosberg; 44. (United Kingdom) Lewis Hamilton
- Debut: 2014 Australian Grand Prix
- First win: 2014 Australian Grand Prix
- Last win: 2014 Abu Dhabi Grand Prix
- Last event: 2014 Abu Dhabi Grand Prix
Races	Wins	Podiums	Poles	F/Laps
19	16	31	18	12
- Constructors' Championships: 1 (2014)
- Drivers' Championships: 1 (Lewis Hamilton, 2014)

The Mercedes F1 W05 Hybrid (originally known as the Mercedes F1 W05), commonly abbreviated as the Mercedes W05) is a highly successful Mercedes-Benz Formula One racing car designed and developed under the direction of Bob Bell, Aldo Costa, Geoff Willis, Loïc Serra, Russell Cooley, John Owen, Mike Elliott and Jarrod Murphy to compete in the 2014 FIA Formula One World Championship. The cars were driven by 2008 World Drivers' Champion Lewis Hamilton and Nico Rosberg, both of whom remained with the team for a second and fifth season, respectively. The F1 W05 was designed to use Mercedes's new 1.6-litre V6 turbocharged engine, the PU106A Hybrid.

The chassis was named "F1 W05 Hybrid" to represent the fifth Formula One car that Mercedes had constructed since 2010, while the hybrid was marked to recognize the utilization of fully integrated hybrid power units. The car made its competitive debut at the 2014 Australian Grand Prix, the opening round of the 2014 season. After participating in 18 rounds of Grand Prix racing, the car made its final competition appearance at the season finale race – the 2014 Abu Dhabi Grand Prix, before retirement. As the first Mercedes F1 car of the hybrid era of the sport, this was the car that kick-started an unparalleled period of dominance by Mercedes in the sport that lasted for eight years, delivering 81 Grand Prix wins for Hamilton, 20 for Rosberg (until 2016) and 10 (from 2017) for Valtteri Bottas. It became the second Mercedes F1 car to win the drivers' title in 59 years and the first to win the constructors' title.

== Competitiveness and performance ==
The car was an instant success, with Nico Rosberg winning the season-opening Australian Grand Prix by 27 seconds. Lewis Hamilton went on to win the Malaysian Grand Prix, Bahrain Grand Prix, Chinese Grand Prix and Spanish Grand Prix successively. The car was said to be so dominant because of an innovative design feature on the PU106A, the car's engine. Sky Sports F1 reported that the compressor and turbo were packaged at opposite ends of the internal combustion engine, which gave them the edge in packaging, aerodynamic efficiency, and battery usage. Lewis Hamilton described it as the best car he has ever driven.

At the halfway point of the season, Mercedes had secured all but one win – in Canada, won by the Red Bull driver, Daniel Ricciardo – and one pole, when Williams driver Felipe Massa did so in Austria. This came after Hamilton won the British Grand Prix and Rosberg won the Monaco, Austrian and German Grands Prix. The team clinched the Constructors' Championship at the Russian Grand Prix, the 16th race of the season. In the nineteen races, the F1 W05 Hybrid took sixteen wins (eleven for Hamilton and five for Rosberg), eighteen pole positions (seven for Hamilton and eleven for Rosberg), twelve fastest laps (seven for Hamilton and five for Rosberg), twelve front row lockouts and eleven 1–2 finishes.

== Season summary ==
The form the F1 W05 Hybrid enjoyed from the start of the season to the Chinese Grand Prix, was the most dominant performance in the first four races of the season in the history of the sport. The car qualified on pole for each race, led every racing lap, won every race, and set every fastest lap. At the fifth race of the season, the Spanish Grand Prix, the car led every lap with both Hamilton (from pole) and Rosberg leading for portions of the race, but Sebastian Vettel recorded the fastest lap. The car claimed every pole, led every lap, and won every race in the season up to the Monaco Grand Prix. The F1 W05 Hybrid's streak ended at the Canadian Grand Prix where Daniel Ricciardo beat Nico Rosberg to the win, after the car's motor generator unit for kinetic energy (MGU-K) failed. Felipe Massa ended the F1 W05 Hybrid's streak of pole positions during qualifying for the Austrian Grand Prix, but Mercedes would regain their form, with a 1–2 result, despite concerns of brake issues and threat from the Williams duo of Massa and Valtteri Bottas.

The next race of the season was the British Grand Prix where the fight between Hamilton and Rosberg got closer. Rosberg's car failed to complete the race and Hamilton won in front of his home fans. The German Grand Prix had two different stories at Mercedes. The one saw Hamilton have a brake disc explode in qualifying and the other saw Rosberg win pole and the race. The last race before the summer break was the Hungarian Grand Prix. Hamilton entered the weekend hoping to win his third straight Hungarian Grand Prix. Again like Germany there were two extremely different stories. Hamilton again had an issue in qualifying, with a broken fuel line causing a fire, while Rosberg won pole again. The race was very chaotic, between the rain and safety cars, Hamilton found himself ahead of his teammate to take home third, which extended Mercedes's consecutive podium finishes streak to eleven races. Rosberg and Hamilton qualified first and second for the first time since Canada at the Belgian Grand Prix, but contact between the two, whilst battling for the lead on the second lap resulted in a puncture for Hamilton and a damaged front wing for Rosberg. Rosberg recovered to finish second but Hamilton had to retire late in the race.

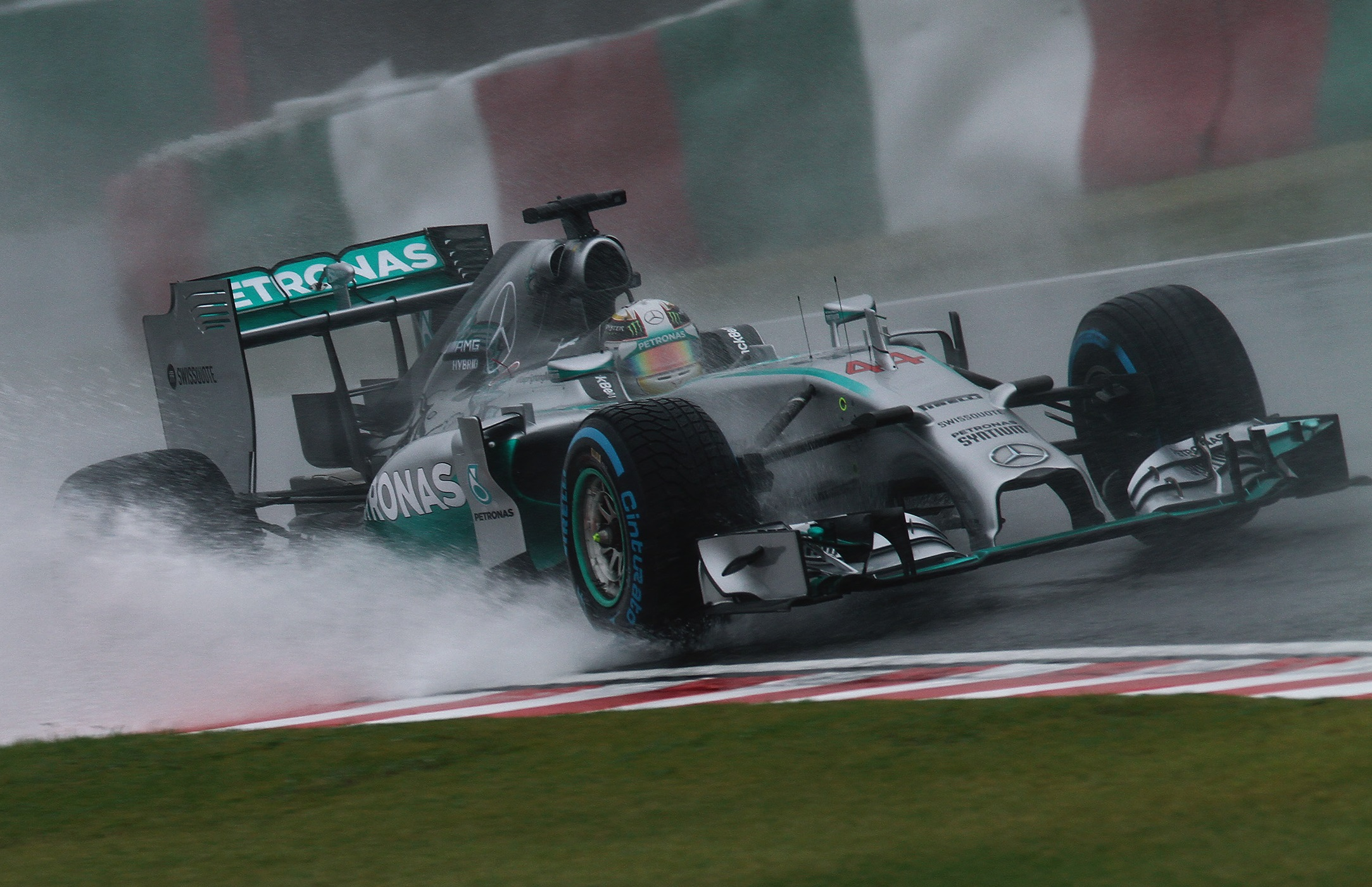
Lewis Hamilton won in Japan, a race marred by torrential rain and the fatal accident of Jules Bianchi

The two Mercedes again locked out the front row at Italian Grand Prix and Hamilton was on pole for the first time since Spain. The two controlled the race and came home first and second for the seventh time in the season. At the Singapore Grand Prix, Hamilton and Rosberg locked out the front row for the seventh time in 2014. Rosberg's car developed an electrical fault and he therefore had to start from the pit lane. He retired after just 15 laps, when his car would not restart at his first pit stop; it was his second retirement of the season. Hamilton however dominated the race, taking fastest lap and leading all but two laps in the process, and won his seventh race of the season to take the Drivers' Championship lead for the first time since Spain, by a margin of three points heading to Suzuka. Mercedes took another 1–2 with Hamilton extending his championship lead to 10 points at the Japanese Grand Prix. Rosberg and Hamilton locked out the front row for the eighth time, with Rosberg taking his eighth pole. The race was wet throughout and Mercedes again dominated but Rosberg could not hold off Hamilton, who took his eighth win of the season, while Rosberg took his eighth second place and Mercedes's eighth 1–2 in the process. The power advantage of the car was shown when they opened up a 17-second lead over third place in just the first three racing laps.

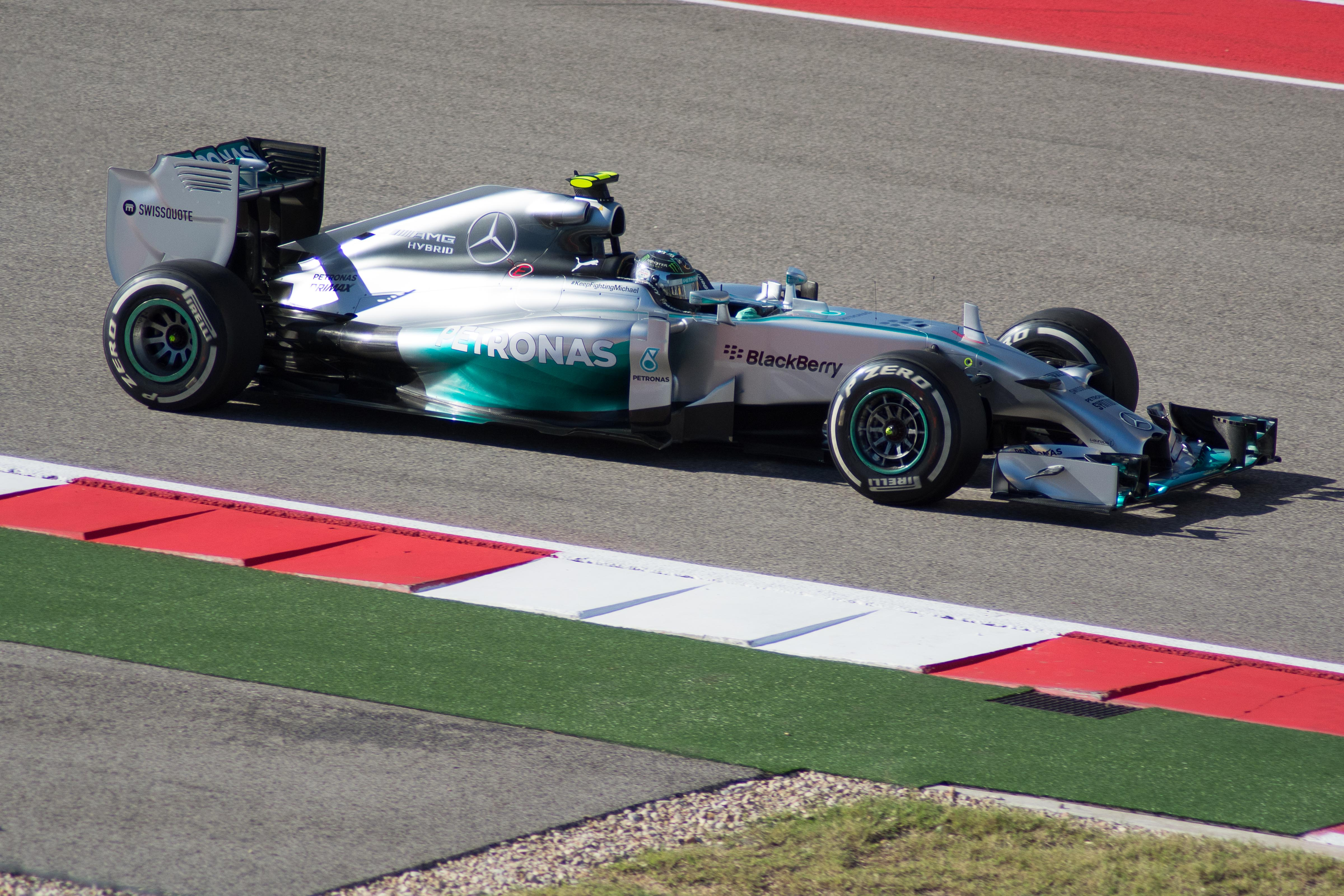
Rosberg at the United States Grand Prix, where he took pole position and would finish second in the race

At the Russian Grand Prix, Mercedes clinched their first Constructors' Championship after yet another 1–2 finish. They locked out the front row out for the fifth successive race and Hamilton won comfortably by 13 seconds from Rosberg, who after locking up at turn one on the first lap and pitting recovered and finished second, again proving the true pace of the Mercedes. At the United States Grand Prix, Mercedes locked the front row out for the sixth successive race – and tenth time in 2014 – with Rosberg taking his ninth pole of the season. The two again dominated the race taking the team's tenth 1–2 finish of the season. Hamilton, as had been the case in the previous races, stuck behind in the first half of the race, overtook Rosberg around the halfway point and then controlled the race from there; he won his tenth race of the season, and his fifth in succession. At the Brazilian Grand Prix, Mercedes secured a seventh consecutive (and eleventh of 2014) front row lockout, with Rosberg finishing 41 seconds ahead of Felipe Massa in 3rd place. Rosberg and Hamilton finished 1–2 for a record 11th time, beating McLaren's 26-year-old record of 10. Rosberg won the race and cut the gap down to 17 points going into the season finale in Abu Dhabi. Mercedes locked out the front row once again, with Rosberg on pole again. In the race, Hamilton moved ahead of Rosberg at the start and controlled the race throughout, but Rosberg suffered an ERS failure midway through the race. Rosberg carried on but could only manage 14th position (the only time the team finished a race outside the points in the entire season), while Hamilton won his 11th race of the season and with it the World Championship.

== Sponsorship and livery ==
The Mercedes F1 W05 Hybrid carried the same grey colour scheme retained since 2010. Throughout the season, the team honoured Michael Schumacher who had been injured by featuring on their cars a hashtag "#KeepFightingMichael". In Malaysia, the disappearance of Malaysia Airlines flight 370 a hashtag "#TributeToMH370". In that same race, fuel supplier Primax once again sponsored the team (seen on the sidepods), as they had previously sponsored the W05's predecessor in the same race the year before.

== Complete Formula One results ==
(key) (results in bold indicate pole position; results in italics indicate fastest lap)

Year	Entrant	Engine	Tyres	Drivers	Grands Prix																			Points	WCC
Year	Entrant	Engine	Tyres	Drivers	AUS	MAL	BHR	CHN	ESP	MON	CAN	AUT	GBR	GER	HUN	BEL	ITA	SIN	JPN	RUS	USA	BRA	ABU‡	Points	WCC
2014	Mercedes AMG Petronas F1 Team	Mercedes PU106A Hybrid	**P**	Nico Rosberg	1	2	**2**	2	2	**1**	**2**	1	**Ret**	**1**	**4**	**2**	2	Ret	**2**	2	**2**	**1**	**14**	**701**	**1st**
2014	Mercedes AMG Petronas F1 Team	Mercedes PU106A Hybrid	**P**	Lewis Hamilton	**Ret**	**1**	1	**1**	**1**	2	Ret	2	1	3	3	Ret	**1**	**1**	1	**1**	1	2	1	**701**	**1st**

‡ — Teams and drivers scored double points at the Abu Dhabi Grand Prix.

Awards
Preceded by Red Bull RB9	Autosport; Racing Car Of The Year; 2014	Succeeded by Mercedes F1 W06 Hybrid
