= Mercedes F1 W04 =

Formula One racing car

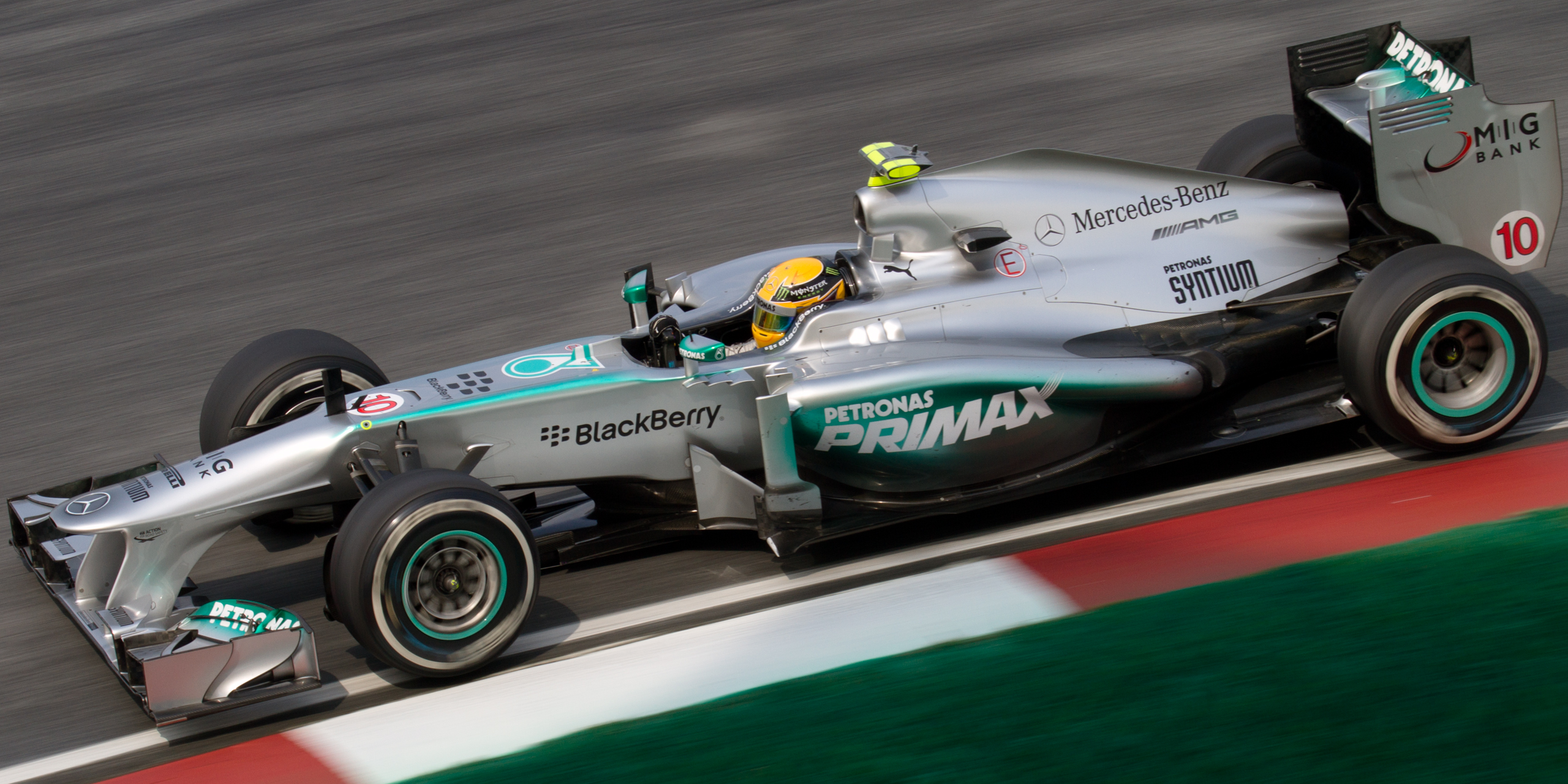
- The W04 driven by Lewis Hamilton at the Malaysian Grand Prix
- Category: Formula One
- Constructor: Mercedes
- Designers: Bob Bell (Technical Director); Aldo Costa (Engineering Director); Geoff Willis (Technology Director); John Owen (Chief Designer); Craig Wilson (Head of Vehicle Engineering); Loïc Serra (Chief Vehicle Dynamicist); Russell Cooley (Chief Engineer); Mike Elliott (Head of Aerodynamics); David Jeffrey (Deputy Head of Aerodynamics); David Jeffrey (Chief Aerodynamicist)
- Predecessor: Mercedes F1 W03
- Successor: Mercedes F1 W05 Hybrid

Technical specifications
- Chassis: Moulded carbon fibre composite monocoque incorporating front and side impact structures
- Suspension (front): Pushrod suspension
- Suspension (rear): Pullrod suspension
- Engine: Mercedes-Benz FO 108F 2.4 L (146 cu in) V8 (90°) naturally-aspirated, 18,000 RPM limited with KERS
- Transmission: Jointly Xtrac 1044 with Mercedes AMG housing 7-speed semi-automatic transmission including reverse
- Power: 750 + 80 hp (559 + 60 kW) @ 18,000 rpm with KERS mode
- Weight: 642 kg
- Fuel: Petronas Primax
- Lubricants: Petronas Syntium
- Tyres: Pirelli P Zero (dry), Cinturato (wet)

Competition history
- Notable entrants: Mercedes AMG Petronas F1 Team
- Notable drivers: 9. (Germany) Nico Rosberg; 10. (United Kingdom) Lewis Hamilton
- Debut: 2013 Australian Grand Prix
- First win: 2013 Monaco Grand Prix
- Last win: 2013 Hungarian Grand Prix
- Last event: 2013 Brazilian Grand Prix
Races	Wins	Podiums	Poles	F/Laps
19	3	9	8	1

The Mercedes F1 W04 (originally known as the Mercedes AMG W04),commonly abbreviated as the Mercedes W04) is a Formula One racing car designed and built by the Mercedes team for use in the 2013 season. It was driven by Nico Rosberg, who remained with the team for a fourth season, and 2008 World Champion Lewis Hamilton, who joined the team after Michael Schumacher's retirement.

== Background ==
Following a difficult 2012 season in which the team finished fifth in the World Constructors' Championship despite recording their maiden victory at the Chinese Grand Prix, team principal Ross Brawn carried out an extensive array of changes to the team's engineering positions. Aldo Costa was recruited from Ferrari, as were Geoff Willis from the now-defunct HRT F1 Team and Mike Elliott from Lotus F1. Parallel to this, Mercedes's long-time Vice President of Motorsport Norbert Haug left the team; he was replaced by Toto Wolff, who left his role of Executive Director at Williams to take the position.

The car was revealed on 4 February at Jerez by its two drivers.

== Race history ==
The W04 endured a difficult start to its season. Although Hamilton and Rosberg secured two podium finishes and three consecutive pole position starts within the first five races, the car developed a reputation for being notoriously harsh on its tyres during a time when tyre supplier Pirelli was faced with heavy criticism for the delicate structure of its tyre compounds, and the narrow operating window, which exacerbated the W04's inherent flaws. This was evidenced in the Bahrain and Spanish Grands Prix, where Nico Rosberg qualified on pole for both races, but went on to finish them in ninth and sixth places respectively.

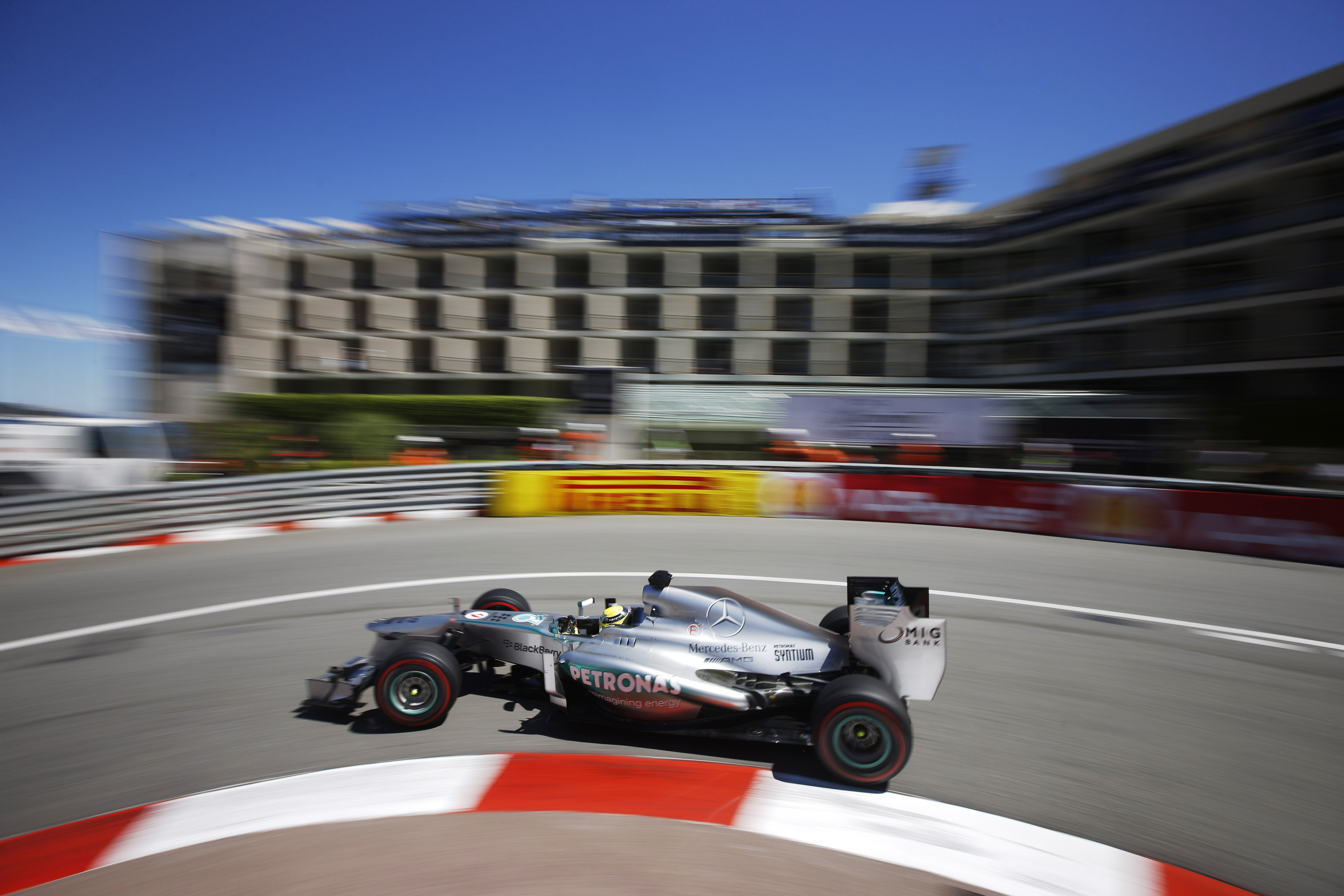
Rosberg took home his second career victory in Monaco.

At the Monaco Grand Prix, the W04 achieved its second front row lockout in as many races (Rosberg and Hamilton locked out the front row in Spain) with Nico Rosberg on pole and Lewis Hamilton in second. Rosberg went on to win the race, repeating the feat of his father Keke Rosberg in the 1983 race, Hamilton finished in fourth.

At the British Grand Prix, Hamilton qualified on pole with Rosberg in second. In the race, Hamilton was comfortably leading, until lap 8, when his car suffered a left-rear tyre failure on the Wellington Straight. Felipe Massa had a similar tyre failure and a subsequent tyre explosion on Jean-Éric Vergne's car brought out the safety car on lap 16. Rosberg went on to win the race ahead of Red Bull's Mark Webber by just 0.7 seconds giving Mercedes their second win of the season.

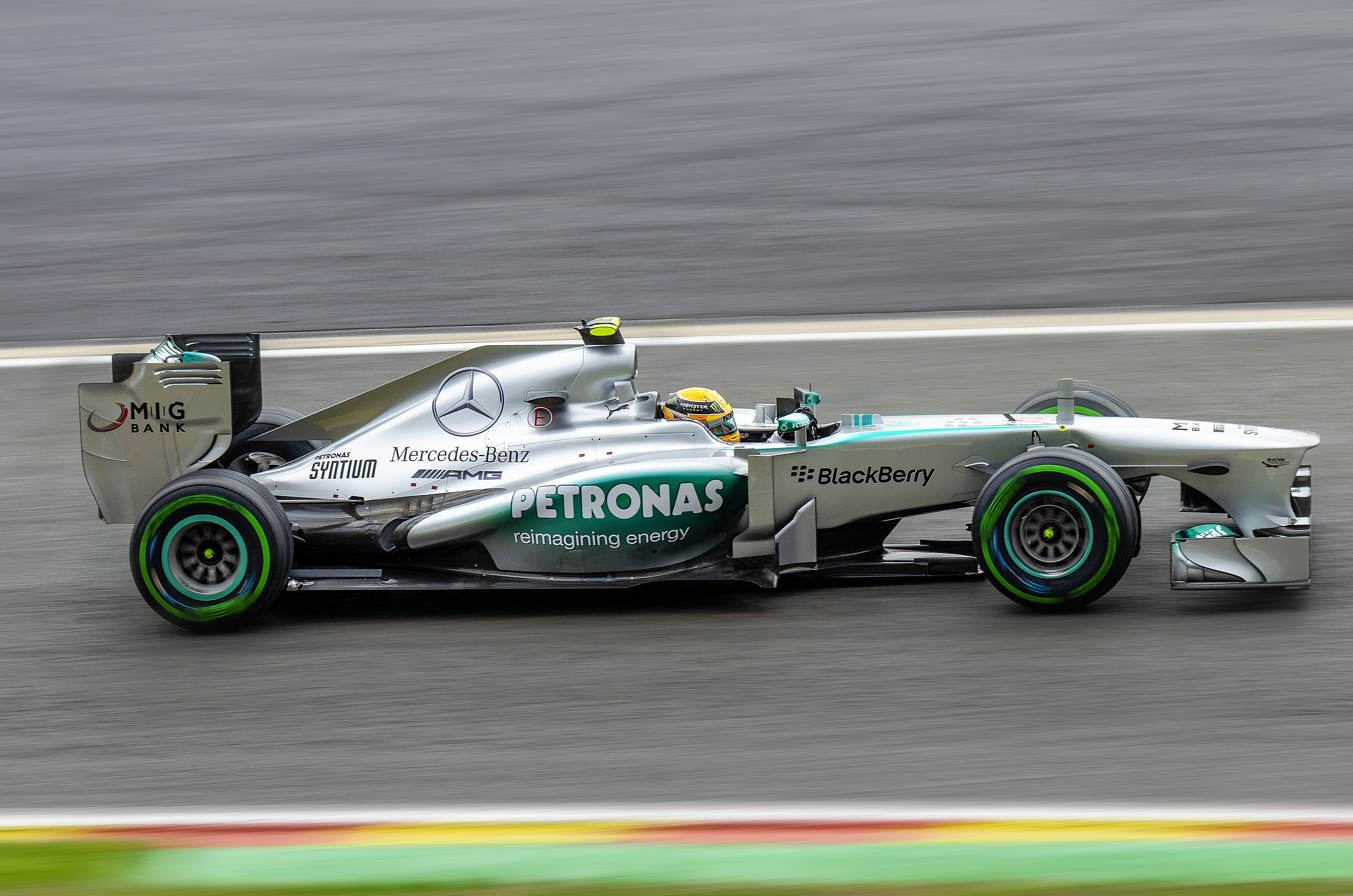
Lewis Hamilton driving the W04 during the qualifying session of the Belgian Grand Prix where he took pole position.

In Hungary, Hamilton secured his first win for the team after starting on pole position, he managed his tyres without any of the early season trouble he had faced. Rosberg dropped back at the start and retired for the third and final time in the season. Belgium was next and Hamilton secured his 4th pole position in a row. However, Sebastian Vettel was too quick for the Mercedes and ran away with the race; Hamilton and Rosberg finished 3rd and 4th and kept themselves in 2nd place in the championship.

India and Abu Dhabi came as the 2 venues for the team's final podium finishes after difficult races in Singapore, Korea and Japan-where Hamilton suffered his first retirement of the season. Nico Rosberg inherited 2nd place in India when Webber retired and he finished 'best of the rest' in 3rd behind the 2 Red Bulls in Abu Dhabi.

In Brazil, Hamilton had been running 4th and on course for the podium but when lapping Valtteri Bottas they touched which left Hamilton with a puncture and a drive through which dropped him out of the points. He fought back to 9th and combined with Rosberg's 5th-place finish the team secured 2nd place in the Constructors' Championship, a huge improvement from 5th in 2012.

== Sponsorship and livery ==
This was the first year that Mercedes received a new sponsorship from BlackBerry. In Malaysia, Primax co-branding was present on the sidepods. At the Indian Grand Prix, the Airtel logo was placed in the car's air intake. At the Singapore, Korean, Japanese, Indian, and Abu Dhabi Grands Prix, BlackBerry Messenger logos were used instead of the standard BlackBerry branding.

== Post-competition ==
On 17 November 2023, the Mercedes W04 chassis no.4 (the exact chassis with which Hamilton took his victory in Hungary) was sold at auction at US$18.8 million (£15.1 million) by RM Sotheby's at Las Vegas ahead of the 2023 Las Vegas Grand Prix. This was the second most expensive Formula 1 car ever sold at auction behind the 1954 W196.

In December 2024, Hamilton drove the W04 at the Silverstone Circuit for the last time as a Mercedes driver, marking the end of the most successful driver and team partnership in F1 history.

== Complete Formula One results ==
(key) (results in bold indicate pole position; results in italics indicate fastest lap)

Year	Entrant	Engine	Tyres	Drivers	1	2	3	4	5	6	7	8	9	10	11	12	13	14	15	16	17	18	19	Pts	WCC
2013	Mercedes AMG Petronas F1 Team	Mercedes-Benz; FO 108F	**P**		AUS	MAL	CHN	BHR	ESP	MON	CAN	GBR	GER	HUN	BEL	ITA	SIN	KOR	JPN	IND	ABU	USA	BRA	**360**	**2nd**
2013	Mercedes AMG Petronas F1 Team	Mercedes-Benz; FO 108F	**P**	(Germany) Nico Rosberg	Ret	4	Ret	**9**	**6**	**1**	5	1	9	19^{†}	4	6	4	7	8	2	3	9	5	**360**	**2nd**
2013	Mercedes AMG Petronas F1 Team	Mercedes-Benz; FO 108F	**P**	(United Kingdom) Lewis Hamilton	5	3	**3**	5	12	4	3	**4**	**5**	**1**	**3**	9	5	5	Ret	6	7	4	9	**360**	**2nd**

^{†} Driver failed to finish the race, but was classified as they had completed greater than 90% of the race distance.
.
