= Mercedes-AMG F1 W11 EQ Performance =

2020 Formula One racing car

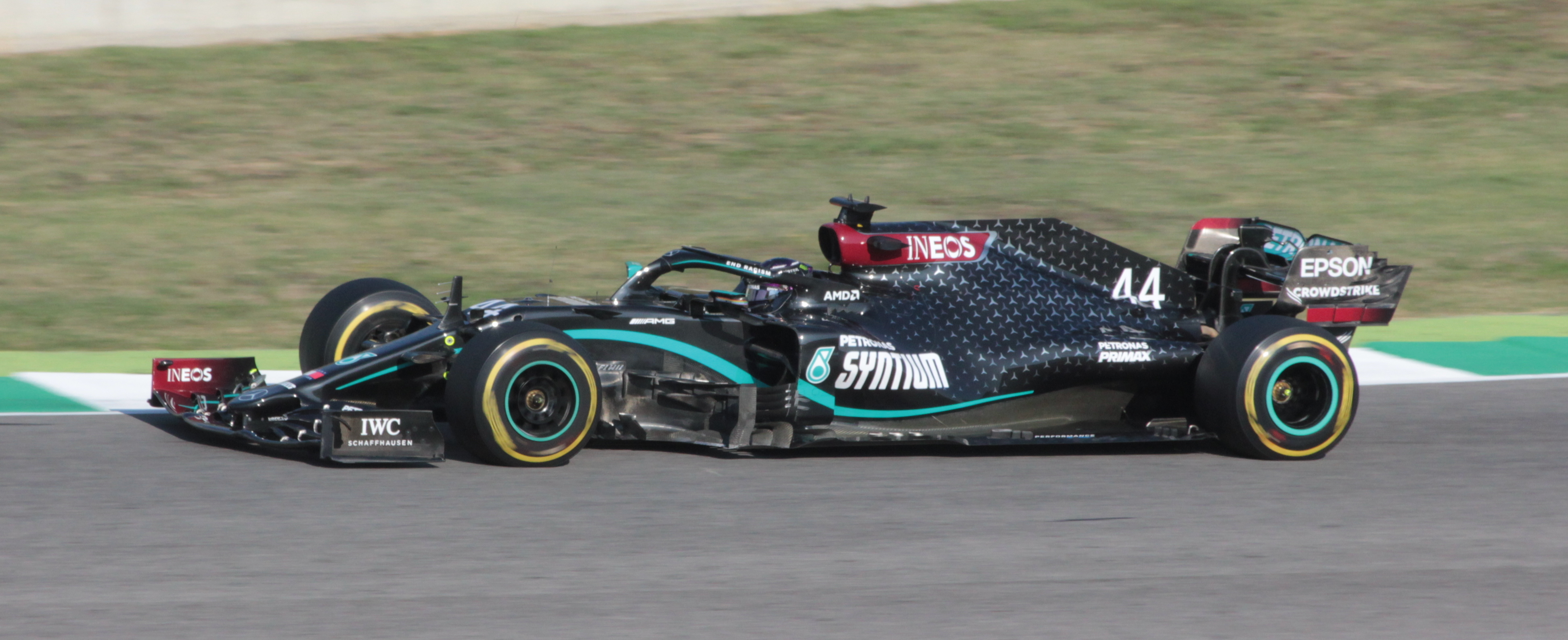
- The Mercedes AMG F1 W11 Performance in its updated livery, driven by Lewis Hamilton during the Tuscan Grand Prix
- Category: Formula One
- Constructor: Mercedes
- Designers: James Allison (Technical Director); John Owen (Chief Designer); Mike Elliott (Technology Director); Loïc Serra (Performance Director); Ashley Way (Deputy Chief Designer); Emiliano Giangiulio (Head of Vehicle Performance); Jarrod Murphy (Head of Aerodynamics); Eric Blandin (Chief Aerodynamicist); Andy Cowell (Managing Director - Power Unit); Hywel Thomas (Engineering Director - Power Unit)
- Predecessor: Mercedes AMG F1 W10 EQ Power+
- Successor: Mercedes W12

Technical specifications
- Engine: Mercedes-AMG F1 M11 EQ Performance (AMG HPP M11) 1.6 L (98 cu in), 90° - V6 turbocharged engine, limited to 15,000 RPM, in a mid-mounted, rear-wheel drive layout
- Electric motor: Motor Generator Unit–Kinetic (MGU-K), Motor Generator Unit–Heat (MGU-H)
- Transmission: Mercedes co-developed with Xtrac 8-speed semi-automatic seamless-shift sequential gearbox + 1 reverse gear
- Battery: Mercedes lithium-ion battery solution
- Power: 1,025 hp (764 kW)
- Weight: 746 kg (1,644.6 lb)
- Fuel: Petronas Primax
- Lubricants: Petronas Syntium & Tutela
- Tyres: Pirelli P Zero (dry); Pirelli Cinturato (wet)
- Clutch: ZF carbon fibre reinforced carbon plate

Competition history
- Notable entrants: Mercedes-AMG Petronas F1 Team
- Notable drivers: 44. (United Kingdom) Lewis Hamilton; 63. (United Kingdom) George Russell; 77. (Finland) Valtteri Bottas
- Debut: 2020 Austrian Grand Prix
- First win: 2020 Austrian Grand Prix
- Last win: 2020 Bahrain Grand Prix
- Last event: 2020 Abu Dhabi Grand Prix
Races	Wins	Podiums	Poles	F/Laps
17	13	25	15	9
- Constructors' Championships: 1 (2020)
- Drivers' Championships: 1 (Lewis Hamilton, 2020)

The Mercedes-AMG F1 W11 EQ Performance, commonly abbreviated as the Mercedes W11, is a Formula One racing car designed and constructed by the Mercedes-AMG Petronas F1 Team under the direction of James Allison, John Owen, Mike Elliott, Loïc Serra, Ashley Way, Emiliano Giangiulio, Jarrod Murphy and Eric Blandin to compete in the 2020 Formula One World Championship.

The car was driven by Lewis Hamilton and Valtteri Bottas, who remained with the team for an eighth and a fourth season, respectively. Williams driver, and Mercedes protégé, George Russell also drove for the team at the 2020 Sakhir Grand Prix after Hamilton was forced to miss that event having tested positive for COVID-19. The car was planned to make its competitive debut at the 2020 Australian Grand Prix, but this was delayed when the race was cancelled and at least seven upcoming events on the calendar were postponed in response to the COVID-19 pandemic. The F1 W11 made its competitive debut at the 2020 Austrian Grand Prix. The delay to the start of the season allowed the team to address concerns they had about the car's reliability.

The W11 took thirteen wins (eleven for Hamilton and two for Bottas), fifteen pole positions (ten for Hamilton and five for Bottas), nine fastest laps (six for Hamilton, two for Bottas and one for Russell), twelve front-row lockouts and five 1–2 finishes across 17 races. With it, Mercedes secured a seventh consecutive Formula One World Constructor's Championship, breaking a record for consecutive championships previously held by Ferrari. Due to its setting numerous track records (the outright fastest lap ever) at various Formula One circuits, the W11 is considered to be one of the greatest race cars of all time.

== Background ==
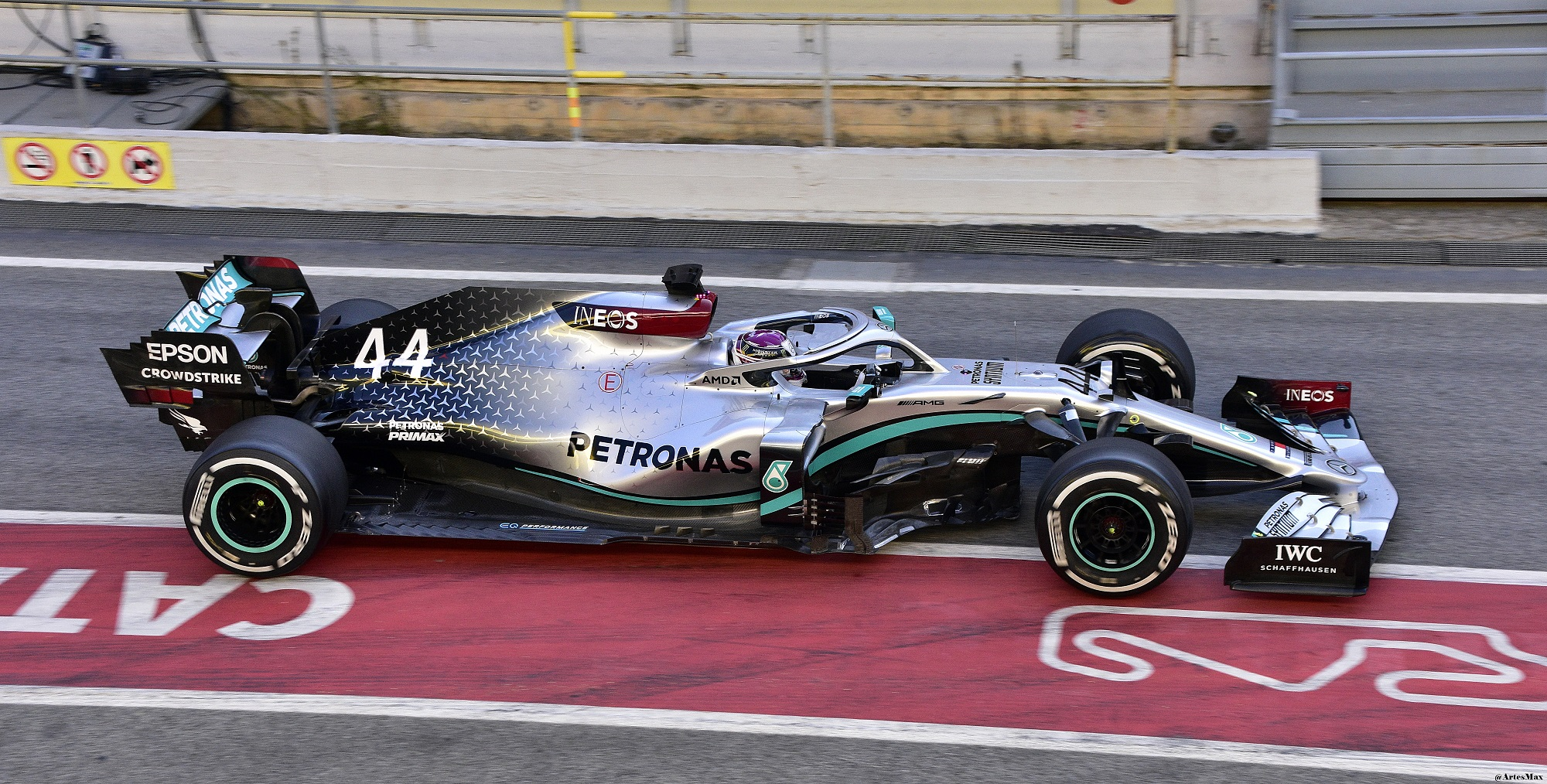
The W11 in its original livery, driven by Lewis Hamilton during the pre-season testing.

The W11 has a system which Mercedes had developed called Dual-Axis Steering (DAS) which allowed the driver to adjust the toe of the front wheels to optimise mechanical grip by pulling or pushing on the steering wheel. DAS allowed the drivers to warm the car's tyres more efficiently by having a zero toe but allows for better cornering ability by using a negative toe, a feature which was of particular significance on circuits with long straights. DAS was removed from the car after the 2020 championship as the system was banned for 2021. The design of the rear suspension was changed from that used in the previous car with the goal of reducing understeer.

Following the postponement of the season and the growing worldwide support for the Black Lives Matter movement, it was announced in late June the W11 would feature black as the primary colour instead of the traditional silver that was present on its predecessors. Driver Lewis Hamilton prompted the livery change, saying he wanted the team to show its support for the cause through more than just social media posts, which led to the idea to adopt a new livery and launch a drive to improve diversity within the team.

== Season summary ==
=== Opening rounds ===
At the season-opening Austrian Grand Prix, Bottas qualified on pole position. Hamilton initially qualified in second place but prior to the race, he received a three-place grid penalty for failing to slow down sufficiently for yellow flags at the end of qualifying, dropping him to fifth. Despite both drivers having to deal with gearbox issues which developed during the race, Bottas went on the win the race, the eighth of his career. Hamilton quickly recovered to second place but in the closing laps of the race received a five-second time penalty for causing a collision with Alexander Albon. Hamilton crossed the finish line in second but the penalty demoted him to fourth place. Hamilton took pole position at the rain-affected qualifying session for the Styrian Grand Prix, over 1.2 seconds clear of nearest rival Max Verstappen. Hamilton led most of the race and took the W11's second consecutive victory, whilst Bottas overtook Verstappen in the closing laps to finish second, having started fourth on the grid.

At the Hungarian Grand Prix, the pace of the W11 was apparent when Mercedes easily took a 1–2 in qualifying, with Hamilton and Bottas outqualifying their nearest competitor, third-placed Lance Stroll, by 0.8 seconds. Hamilton took pole, 0.1 seconds ahead of Bottas. Hamilton would go on to win the race for his second consecutive win and eighth overall at the Hungaroring equalling the record for most wins at one venue. Bottas made a mistake at the start when he moved slightly just before the lights went out and then stopped his car and got away slowly, falling to sixth by turn one. He avoided a penalty for a jump start and managed to recover to third place, finishing just behind second-placed Max Verstappen. At the British Grand Prix, Hamilton led Mercedes to another front-row lockout by taking his third consecutive pole position over Bottas by over 0.3 seconds. Bottas took second by 0.7 seconds over Verstappen who qualified in third. Lewis Hamilton led from pole position at the race start, building up a large lead throughout the race. In the dying stages of the Grand Prix, Bottas and Hamilton both suffered tyre delaminations on laps 50 and 52 respectively, which caused Bottas to come into the pits which made him drop to 11th place. Hamilton was forced to limp home with his delaminated tyre over the entire final lap, and the gap to second place shrank from 30 to about 6 seconds as Hamilton crossed the line.

At the 70th Anniversary Grand Prix, Mercedes were once again unchallenged in qualifying as Bottas led Mercedes to another front-row lockout by edging Hamilton for pole position by only .063 seconds with Nico Hülkenberg a further 0.8 seconds back. Mercedes struggled with race pace due to high temperatures causing excessive tyre wear and blistering. As a result, Red Bull Racing driver Max Verstappen was able to take the lead of the race and win. This was the first time in 2020 that Mercedes failed to win a race.

=== Mid season ===
At the Spanish Grand Prix, Mercedes continued their dominance in qualifying with Hamilton leading a fourth consecutive front-row lockout, qualifying 0.059 seconds faster than Bottas who was over 0.7 seconds faster than third-placed Verstappen. Hamilton took the win in the race itself, leading every lap and coming home over 24 seconds clear of Verstappen in second. Furthermore, Hamilton also set a new Formula One record as he scored his 156th career podium finish, surpassing Michael Schumacher for most all-time. Bottas started poorly and dropped to fourth at the first corner. Although he was able to recover to regain third place, he was not able to overtake Verstappen and lost more ground to him in the drivers' championship. At the Belgian Grand Prix, Hamilton set a new track record at the Circuit de Spa-Francorchamps with a time of 1:41.252, qualifying half a second clear of teammate Bottas in second. The race saw the pair take a 1-2 finish, the team's second of the season, with Hamilton leading from lights to flag and Bottas holding second ahead of Red Bull's Verstappen. Hamilton extended his lead in the Drivers' Championship to forty-seven points over Verstappen in second and fifty points to Bottas in third. Likewise, Mercedes increased their lead in the Constructors' Championship to eighty-six points over second-paced Red Bull Racing heading into middle phase of the season.

=== Closing rounds ===
It was another front row lockout in Bahrain for Hamilton and Bottas. Hamilton won from pole at the Bahrain Grand Prix for the third time in his career but Bottas finished eighth after a puncture under the safety car. Hamilton was forced to miss the 2020 Sakhir Grand Prix following a positive test for coronavirus and was replaced by Williams driver and Mercedes young driver George Russell for that event. Russell started second and led most of the race having overtaken Bottas, who had taken pole, at the start. At the second pit stop, Mercedes made an error and Russell was fitted with Bottas' tyres, forcing Russell to make another pit stop on the following lap, effectively ending his chances of winning the race. A late puncture then cost Russell a potential podium and he finished ninth with the fastest lap. Bottas finished the race in eighth, having poor performance and old tyres at the end of the race. Hamilton returned for the season finale having performed a series of negative coronavirus tests ahead of the Abu Dhabi Grand Prix alongside Bottas, meaning Russell returned to Williams. The Mercedes drivers took second and third on the grid behind Red Bull's Max Verstappen and held those positions during the race.

== Other ==
The W11 was featured as a playable vehicle in F1 2020, Real Racing 3 and CSR2. It was featured as a non-playable vehicle in F1 2021 Braking Point story mode.

== Complete Formula One results ==
(key)

Year	Entrant	Engine	Tyres	Drivers	Grands Prix																	Points	WCC
Year	Entrant	Engine	Tyres	Drivers	AUT	STY	HUN	GBR	70A	ESP	BEL	ITA	TUS	RUS	EIF	POR	EMI	TUR	BHR	SKH	ABU	Points	WCC
2020	Mercedes AMG Petronas F1 Team	Mercedes-AMG F1 M11 EQ Performance	P	Valtteri Bottas	1^{P}	2	3	11	3^{P}	3^{F}	2	5	2	1^{F}	Ret^{P}	2	2^{P}	14	8	8^{P}	2	573	1st
2020	Mercedes AMG Petronas F1 Team	Mercedes-AMG F1 M11 EQ Performance	P	Lewis Hamilton	4	1^{P}	1^{P}^{F}	1^{P}	2^{F}	1^{P}	1^{P}	7^{P}^{F}	1^{P}^{F}	3^{P}	1	1^{P}^{F}	1^{F}	1	1^{P}		3	573	1st
2020	Mercedes AMG Petronas F1 Team	Mercedes-AMG F1 M11 EQ Performance	P	George Russell																9^{F}		573	1st

Notes

Awards
Preceded by Mercedes AMG F1 W10 EQ Power+	Autosport; Racing Car of the Year; 2020	Succeeded by Red Bull Racing RB16B
