= Monkey seat =

Formula 1 car component

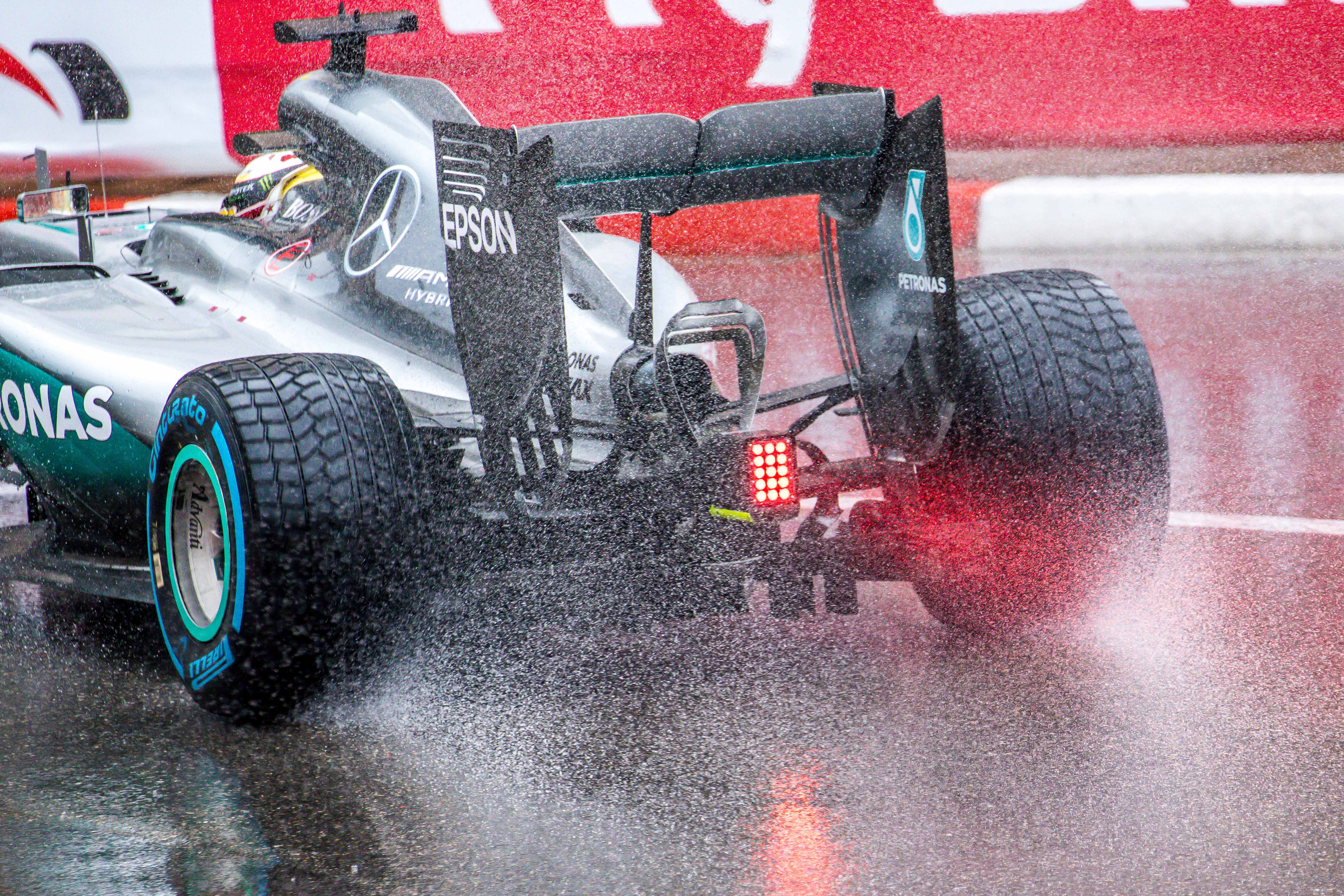
Monkey seat above the exhaust and under the rear wing on Lewis Hamilton's Mercedes F1 W07 Hybrid

Monkey seat is a term used in Formula One to describe a small wing underneath the main rear wing of the car that uses a loophole in the bodywork regulations to generate a small amount of additional downforce.

Minardi introduced a wing similar to the monkey seat in 1995, although in this application the additional wing was sited above rather than below the main wing element. While Arrows used a monkey seat in its current location in 2001, its use did not become widespread until some years later.

With the 2014 technical regulations banning the cars' lower rear wing elements and introducing a mandatory central exhaust position the monkey seat is now increasingly designed and positioned to use the flow from the exhaust to increase the efficiency and consistency of the main rear wing element above it in addition to generating its own downforce.
