= Dual-axis steering =

Racecar innovation

Dual-axis steering (DAS) was a system developed by the Mercedes-AMG F1 Team for their W11 EQ Performance car that competed in the 2020 Formula One World Championship; the team won that year's Constructors' Championship, and their drivers finished first (Lewis Hamilton) and second (Valtteri Bottas) in the Drivers' Championship.

It was considered one of the defining innovations of the W11.

The system was effectively banned by the FIA ahead of the 2021 Championship after an introduction of stricter rules as to how the suspension and steering column may affect each other.

== Mechanism ==
The system allowed the driver to adjust the toe-in and toe-out angle of the car's front wheels by pulling and pushing on the steering wheel.

Typically, the front wheels would have a slight toe-out, in order to improve performance during corners. However, on straight sections of the track, toe-out resulted in uneven heating of the tyres, as well as increased friction. This resulted in decreased tyre longevity and decreased top speeds. With DAS, the driver could adjust the front wheels to a neutral (zero) toe angle, counteracting these effects.

== Reception ==
=== Legality ===
Red Bull Racing lodged an official protest with the FIA, citing that the system was a breach of Formula One's Technical Regulations. Mercedes remained confident that the system was legal. Ultimately, Red Bull's protest was rejected and DAS was allowed for the 2020 season. However, the system was banned from 2021 onwards.

=== Safety ===
Driver Lewis Hamilton believed DAS would have no negative impact on the safety of the driver. The FIA also did not object to the safety of the system itself, merely the competitive advantage the system might provide.

=== Implementation ===
Rival team McLaren indicated no plans to implement DAS within their own car. Scuderia Ferrari indicated mild interest in introducing the system, however noted that an implementation would only arrive mid-season, if at all.
