= Jarrod Murphy =

British aerodynamicist

- Born: 4 September 1973 (age 52); Cardiff, United Kingdom
- Citizenship: British
- Education: Imperial College London
- Occupation: Aerodynamicist
- Employer: Mercedes AMG Petronas Motorsport
- Known for: Formula One aerodynamicist
- Title: aerodynamics director

Jarrod Murphy (born 4 September 1973) is a British Formula One aerodynamicist. He is currently the aerodynamics director at the Mercedes AMG Petronas Motorsport Formula One team.

== Career ==
Murphy studied Aeronautical Engineering at Imperial College London, with the intention of working in aerospace. However, whilst studying his degree he discovered that Formula One offered similar engineering challenges, in both aerodynamics and stress analysis.

Murphy started his career in motorsport as a stress analyst for the Benetton F1 team in 1996. He then moved into CFD (Computer Fluid Dynamics), becoming the head of CFD at Renault in 2006, staying with the Enstone team as it morphed into the Lotus F1 Team. In 2013 he moved to Mercedes to become the chief aerodynamicist before becoming the head of aerodynamics at Mercedes in 2017. In July 2021 he was promoted to Aerodynamics Director covering a broader remit and effectively replacing Mike Elliott as technology director who was promoted to technical director.

== Career timeline ==
- Head of CFD Application – Renault F1 (2002–2006)
- Head of CFD – Renault F1 (2006–2011)
- Head of CFD – Lotus F1 (2012–2013)
- Chief aerodynamicist – Mercedes F1 (2013–2017)
- Head of aerodynamics – Mercedes F1 (2017–2021)
- Aerodynamics Director – Mercedes F1 (2021–)
