= John Owen (Formula One) =

British engineer

- Born: 11 May 1973 (age 52)
- Citizenship: British
- Occupation: Engineer
- Employer: Mercedes AMG Petronas Motorsport
- Known for: Formula One engineer
- Title: Chief designer

John Owen (born 11 May 1973) is a British Formula One engineer. He was the chief designer at the Mercedes AMG Petronas Motorsport Formula One team.

== Career ==
Owen started his career in motorsport in Brackley in 2001, working as an aerodynamicist for chassis manufacturer Reynard Motorsport. A year later, he moved to Hinwil, Switzerland, to work for the Sauber team. In 2004, he was promoted to a senior aerodynamicist for the Swiss outfit. Three years later, he returned to Brackley as principal aerodynamicist for Honda. In 2010 he was promoted to Chief Designer for the Mercedes works team. He led the engineering team at Mercedes until February 2026. Owen was integral to the creation of DAS (Dual-axis steering).

== Career timeline ==
- Aerodynamicist – Reynard Motorsport (2001)
- Aerodynamicist – Sauber (2002–2004)
- Senior aerodynamicist – Sauber (2004–2007)
- Principal aerodynamicist – Honda (2007–2008)
- Principal aerodynamicist – Brawn GP (2009)
- Chief designer – Mercedes AMG Petronas Motorsport (2010–2026)
