= Mike Elliott (Formula One) =

British aerodynamicist (born 1974)

- Born: 4 June 1974 (age 52); St Austell, Cornwall, England
- Citizenship: British
- Education: Imperial College London
- Occupations: Formula 1 Chief Technical Officer, aerodynamicist
- Years active: 2000–2023, 2026–present
- Employer(s): Alpine F1 Team (since 2026); Mercedes-AMG Petronas F1 Team (2012–2023); Renault F1 Team (2008–2012); McLaren (2000–2008)
- Known for: Formula One aerodynamicist
- Title: Chief Technical Officer

Mike Elliott (born 4 June 1974) is a British Formula One aerodynamicist. Since 2026, he serves as the Chief Technical Officer of Alpine F1 Team; and was formerly the Chief Technical Officer, Technical Director, Technology Director and Head of Aerodynamics at the Mercedes-AMG Petronas F1 Team, leaving in October 2023.

== Biography ==
Elliott started his career in motorsport in 2000 as an aerodynamicist for McLaren. In 2003, he then became a trackside aerodynamicist before progressing on to being the team leader for aerodynamic performance at McLaren in 2006. In 2008, he moved to the Renault F1 Team to become the principal aerodynamicist, he stayed with the Enstone team until 2012 when he moved to Mercedes to become the head of aerodynamics.

In 2017, he replaced Geoff Willis as Technology Director at Mercedes. In 2021, he succeeded James Allison as technical director at the team, who became Chief Technical Officer of Mercedes and Chief Technical Officer of INEOS Britannia. He would go on to lead the development of the infamous "zeropod concept" that debuted on the W13 and continued into the W14 before switching roles with James Allison in early 2023.

On 21 April 2023, it was announced that Elliott would swap roles with Allison, who would return as Technical Director, while Elliott would become Chief Technical Officer. He subsequently left Mercedes in October 2023.

In 2026, Alpine announced the signing of Elliott as their new Chief Technical Officer, where he would "lead and oversee the technical and engineering functions at the team’s factory at Enstone."

== Career timeline ==
- Aerodynamicist – McLaren (2000–2003)
- Trackside Aerodynamicist – McLaren (2003–2006)
- Team Leader, Aerodynamic performance – McLaren (2006–2008)
- Principal Aerodynamicist – Renault F1 (2008–2011)
- Principal Aerodynamicist – Lotus F1 (2012)
- Head of Aerodynamics – Mercedes F1 (2012–2017)
- Technology Director – Mercedes F1 (2017–2021)
- Technical Director – Mercedes F1 (2021–2023)
- Chief Technical Officer – Mercedes F1 (2023)
- Chief Technical Officer – Alpine F1 (2026–present)
