= Mercedes W17 =

2026 Formula One car

Mercedes-AMG F1 W17 E Performance
- Andrea Kimi Antonelli driving the Mercedes W17 at the 2026 Austrian Grand Prix
- Category: Formula One
- Designers: James Allison (Technical Director); Simone Resta (Deputy Technical Director); John Owen (Car Design Director); Jarrod Murphy (Aerodynamics Director); David Nelson (Performance Director); Giacomo Tortora (Engineering Director); Ashley Way (Chief Engineer - Car Design); Richard Pattinson (Chief Engineer - Car Design); Hywel Thomas (Managing Director - Power Unit); Lorenzo Sassi (Engineering Director - Power Unit)
- Predecessor: Mercedes W16

Technical specifications
- Suspension (front): Carbon fibre wishbone and pushrod-activated springs and dampers
- Suspension (rear): Carbon fibre wishbone and pushrod-activated springs and dampers
- Length: 5,505 mm (216.7 in)
- Width: 1,900 mm (75 in)
- Height: 950 mm (37.4 in)
- Wheelbase: 3,400 mm (133.9 in)
- Engine: Mercedes-AMG F1 M17 E Performance
- Transmission: Mercedes 8-speed hydraulic actuated semi automatic sequential gearbox, + 1 reverse gear
- Weight: 772 kg (including driver, coolant and oil)
- Fuel: Petronas Primax
- Lubricants: Petronas Tutela
- Tyres: Pirelli P Zero (Dry/Slick); Pirelli Cinturato (Wet/Treaded)

Competition history
- Notable entrants: Mercedes-AMG Petronas F1 Team
- Notable drivers: 12. (Italy) Kimi Antonelli; 63. (United Kingdom) George Russell
- Debut: 2026 Australian Grand Prix
- First win: 2026 Australian Grand Prix
- Last win: 2026 United States Grand Prix
- Last event: 2026 São Paulo Grand Prix
Races	Wins	Podiums	Poles	F/Laps
20	12	24	12	10
- Constructors' Championships: 1 (2026)
- Drivers' Championships: 1 (2026, Kimi Antonelli)

The Mercedes-AMG F1 W17 E Performance, commonly known as the Mercedes W17, is a Formula One racing car designed and built by the Mercedes-AMG Petronas F1 Team to compete in the 2026 Formula One World Championship. It is currently being driven by George Russell and Kimi Antonelli in their fifth and second seasons with the team, respectively. Antonelli achieved his maiden win with the car at the 2026 Chinese Grand Prix, secured his maiden Drivers' Championship at the Mexico City Grand Prix, and helped Mercedes secure the Constructors' Championship at the São Paulo Grand Prix.

The W17 was developed with new regulations in mind, which eliminated ground effect and prioritised the electrical components of the Mercedes-developed engine. Commentators noted strong showings during the pre-season testing, leading them to favour Mercedes. While the car was consistently the fastest on the grid in the early half of the season, Mercedes weathered mid-season resurgences for Red Bull and McLaren on their way to their first double Championships since 2020 - including their first Drivers' Championship since 2020, and their first Constructors' Championship since 2021.

As of the 2026 São Paulo Grand Prix, the W17 has scored 12 wins (plus four sprint wins), 24 podiums (plus five sprint podiums), 12 pole positions (plus three sprint pole positions) and 10 fastest laps (plus two sprint fastest laps).

== Background ==
=== Development ===
Overseen by James Allison, the W17 is the first Mercedes car designed for the 2026 regulations, resulting in a lighter, smaller and narrower package than its predecessor. Controversy struck with Mercedes and Red Bull Powertrains finding a loophole in the new regulations allowing for a higher compression ratio than the prescribed 1:16 at operating temperature, while staying within the regulated limit when measured at ambient temperatures. The W17 registered its first 200 kilometres during a shakedown at Silverstone with both drivers testing the car.

=== Livery ===
Unveiled on 22 January 2026, the W17 livery is similar to the W16. Microsoft has become the airbox sponsor in place of the red Ineos branding on the car's predecessor. Along the sidepods, a zebra stripe pattern of silver and black has been added, forming the AMG logo. For the Bahrain Grand Prix, held in Malaysia, the W17 ran a special livery for title sponsor Petronas since the company is based in Malaysia. Similarly to the 2024 livery, the silver was replaced with Petronas blue.

== Competition and development history ==
=== Opening rounds ===
The car made its competitive debut at the 2026 Australian Grand Prix, where Russell topped the third practice while Antonelli crashed his car in the third practice. The mechanics were able to rebuild the car by the end of Q1, partly due to a red flag caused by Max Verstappen crashing his car. The car proved to be highly competitive, as Russell and Antonelli locked out the front row for the team with Russell finishing 0.785 seconds ahead of closest non-Mercedes car.

At the start of the race, Russell lost the lead to the Ferrari of Charles Leclerc, while Antonelli dropped down to seventh place. Leclerc and Russell traded places for the first 12 laps while Antonelli moved up to fourth place behind Leclerc's teammate Lewis Hamilton. Mercedes capitalised on a Virtual Safety Car by pitting both on lap 13. The leading two Ferraris pitted both cars later on in the race under normal racing conditions and came out behind both Mercedes. Both cars managed 45 laps on hard tyres to the checkered flag, securing a 1-2 finish twelve seconds clear of the closest car. The win marked Mercedes' 61st 1–2 finish, and the first by Mercedes since the 2024 Las Vegas Grand Prix, which was won by Russell, and put the team into an early lead in both championships.

At the Chinese Grand Prix, the car continued its dominant form. Russell took sprint pole ahead of Antonelli, with the two locking out the front row for the sprint race. Russell went on to win while Antonelli fell down to 5th. In qualifying for the main race, Antonelli became the youngest ever Formula One polesitter at 19 years and 6 months. Russell salvaged second despite an issue in Q3 that left him with only a single flying lap. At the start, both Antonelli and Russell lost positions to Ferrari but climbed their way back. Antonelli secured his first ever Grand Prix win, becoming the second youngest ever Grand Prix winner behind Max Verstappen. Antonelli also set the fastest lap, becoming the youngest ever driver to secure a hat trick of a pole, a race win, and the fastest lap. Russell came home second, and the result marked back-to-back 1-2 finishes for the team.

The team remained dominant at the Japanese Grand Prix, where they ran a special front wing design. Antonelli and Russell locked out the front row once again. Despite dropping down the field on the start, where he was passed by Oscar Piastri, Antonelli made use of a well-timed safety car to retake the lead of the race, one he held until he won (also taking the fastest lap). Russell finished outside the podium for the first time this season after being held off by Leclerc.

The team and car stayed dominant during the Miami Grand Prix, as Antonelli finished qualifying on pole for the main race and second for the sprint race. Russell started the sprint race in 6th position and in 5th for the main race. During both races the W17 scored 45 points in total, 28 for Antonelli and 17 for Russell.

During the Canadian Grand Prix the car and team stayed dominant, as Antonelli scored a podium in both the sprint race and main race, while Russell only got a podium in the sprint race. During the Canadian Grand Prix, the W17 recorded its first retirement/DNF in a race, for Russell on lap 30, this was due to an issue with the battery part of the engine.

At the 2026 Monaco Grand Prix, Antonelli took pole and won. Additionally, he had his first career grand slam as Russell finished 14th after a drive through penalty forced him to pit at the latter stages of the race. Due to post race penalties, Russell gained positions and finished 12th overall.

The 2026 Barcelona-Catalunya Grand Prix saw Russell score his first pole since Montreal and Antonelli qualify on the second row, just behind Ferrari's Lewis Hamilton. The latter won the race to record the first non-Mercedes victory of 2026 with Antonelli retiring in the closing stages following a clash with his teammate. Russell finished second, ahead of defending champion Lando Norris.

== Complete Formula One results ==
Key

Key
Colour	Result
Gold	Winner
Silver	Second place
Bronze	Third place
Green	Other points position
Blue	Other classified position
Blue	Not classified, finished (NC)
Purple	Not classified, retired (Ret)
Red	Did not qualify (DNQ)
Black	Disqualified (DSQ)
White	Did not start (DNS)
White	Race cancelled (C)
Blank	Did not practice (DNP)
Blank	Excluded (EX)
Blank	Did not arrive (DNA)
Blank	Withdrawn (WD)
Blank	Did not enter (empty cell)
Annotation	Meaning
P	Pole position
F	Fastest lap
Superscript number	Points-scoring position in sprint

Year	Entrant	Power unit	Tyres	Driver name	Grands Prix																							Points	WCC pos.
Year	Entrant	Power unit	Tyres	Driver name	AUS	CHN	JPN	MIA	CAN	MON	BCN	AUT	GBR	BEL	HUN	NED	ITA	ESP	AZE	BHR	SIN	USA	MXC	SAP	LVG	QAT	ABU	Points	WCC pos.
2026	Mercedes-AMG Petronas F1 Team	Mercedes-AMG F1 M17 E Performance	P	(United Kingdom) George Russell	1^{P}	2^{1}	4	4^{4}	Ret^{1 P}	12	2^{P}	1^{P}	2^{4}	Ret	7	3^{1}	2	5^{F}	1^{P}^{F}	20†	9	8	6	4				652*	1st
2026	Mercedes-AMG Petronas F1 Team	Mercedes-AMG F1 M17 E Performance	P	(Italy) Kimi Antonelli	2	1^{5 P F}	1^{P}^{F}	1^{6 P}	1^{3 F}	1^{P}^{F}	16†	3^{F}	15^{1 P F}	1^{P}	3	2^{4}	1^{F}	1	5	2	3^{4}	1^{P}	3	5^{F}				652*	1st

* Season still in progress.
