= Silver Arrows =

German racing car

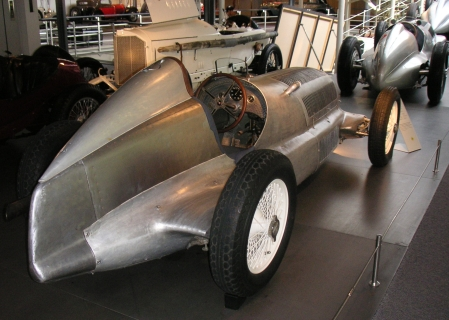
1934 Mercedes-Benz W25 Silberpfeil

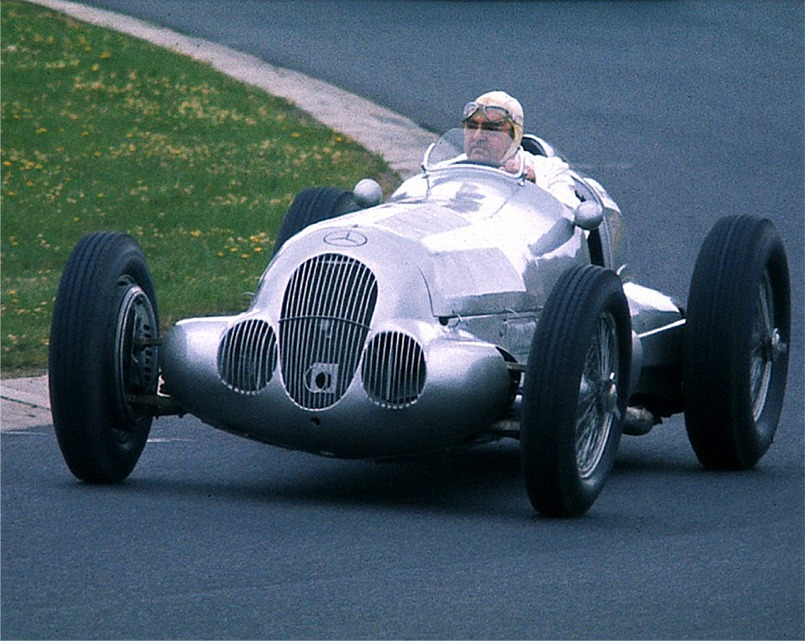
1937 Mercedes-Benz W125

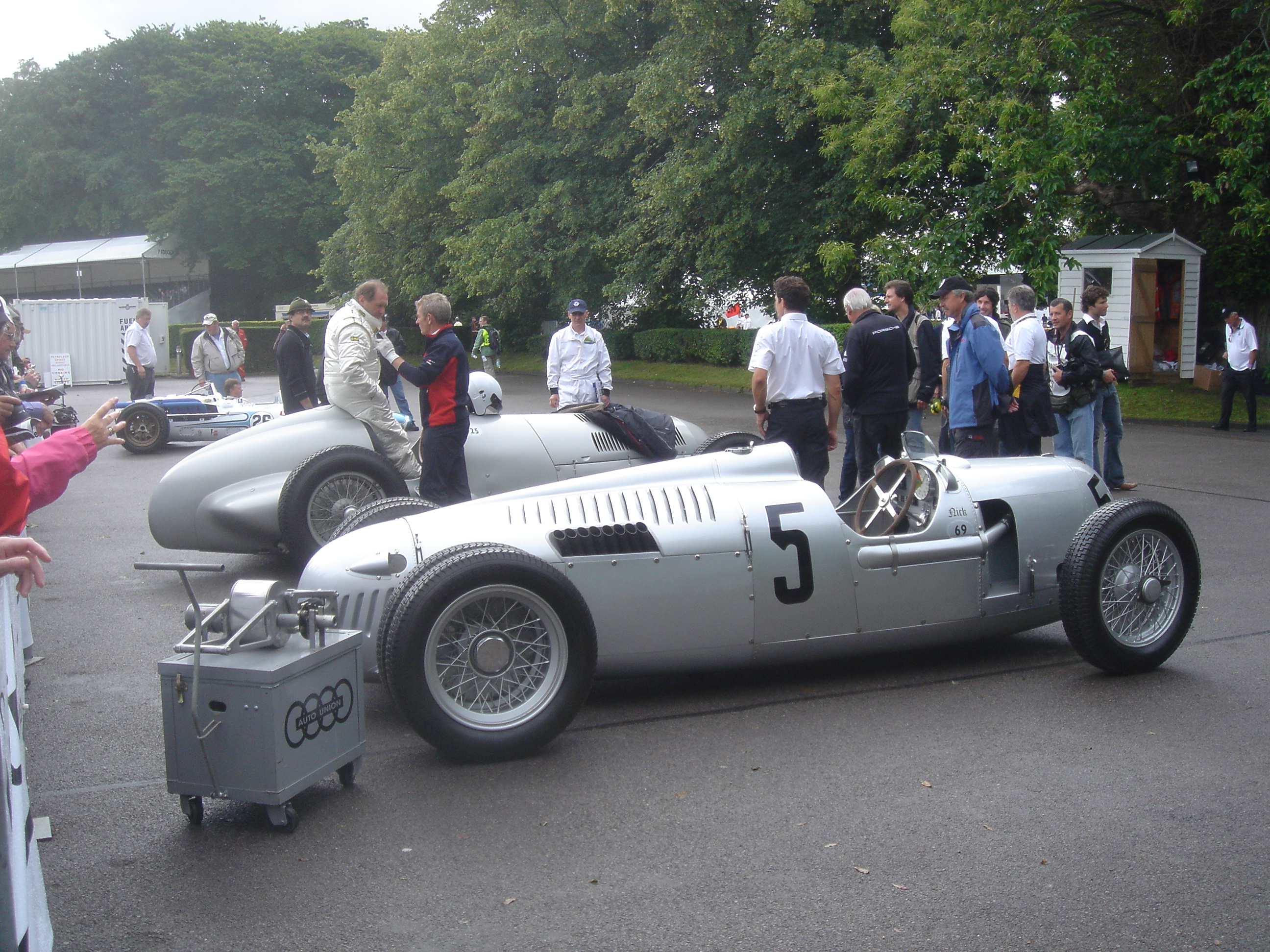
1937 Autounion & Mercedes Silberpfeile

Silver Arrows (German: Silberpfeile) is a nickname typically given to silver racing cars with a significant connection to a German car manufacturer. Although the term was coined in 1932, it came into popular usage regarding Germany's dominant Mercedes-Benz and Auto Union Grand Prix motor racing cars between 1934 and 1939. The name was later applied to the Mercedes-Benz Formula One and sports cars in 1954 and 1955, then to the Sauber Group C prototype racing sports cars that raced at Le Mans in the late 1980s as well as the McLaren-Mercedes Formula One cars of the late 1990s and 2000s, and is currently applied to the Mercedes-AMG Petronas F1 cars from 2010 to present.

For decades until the introduction of sponsorship liveries, each country had its traditional colour in automobile racing. German race cars for their Silver Arrows silver, Italian for their Rosso corsa red, British ones were British racing green green, French Bleu de France blue, etc.

German cars like the Blitzen Benz were white, as were the three Mercedes that won the 1914 French Grand Prix 1–2–3. On the other hand, Mercedes won the Italian Targa Florio with cars painted red in 1922 (Giulio Masetti) and 1924 (Christian Werner), blending in with the local competitors. The big supercharged 200 hp Mercedes-Benz SSKL with which Rudolf Caracciola won the 1931 Mille Miglia was called the White Elephant.

== Origin of the name ==
In 1958, Alfred Neubauer described the origin of the Silver Arrows as being accidental. In 1934 the international governing body of motor sport prescribed a maximum weight limit of 750 kg (1,653 lb) for Grand Prix racing cars, excluding tyres and fuel. Neubauer said that when in spring 1934, the Mercedes-Benz team placed its new Mercedes-Benz W25 on the scrutineering scales prior to the Eifelrennen at the Nürburgring, it allegedly recorded 751 kg (1,656 lb). Racing manager Alfred Neubauer and his driver Manfred von Brauchitsch, who both later published their memoirs, claimed that they had the idea of removing all the white lead-based paint from the bodywork. The story continues that the next day the shining silver aluminium beneath was exposed and scrutineering was passed. After the 350 hp (260 kW) car of Von Brauchitsch won the race, the nickname Silver Arrow was born, according to this version.

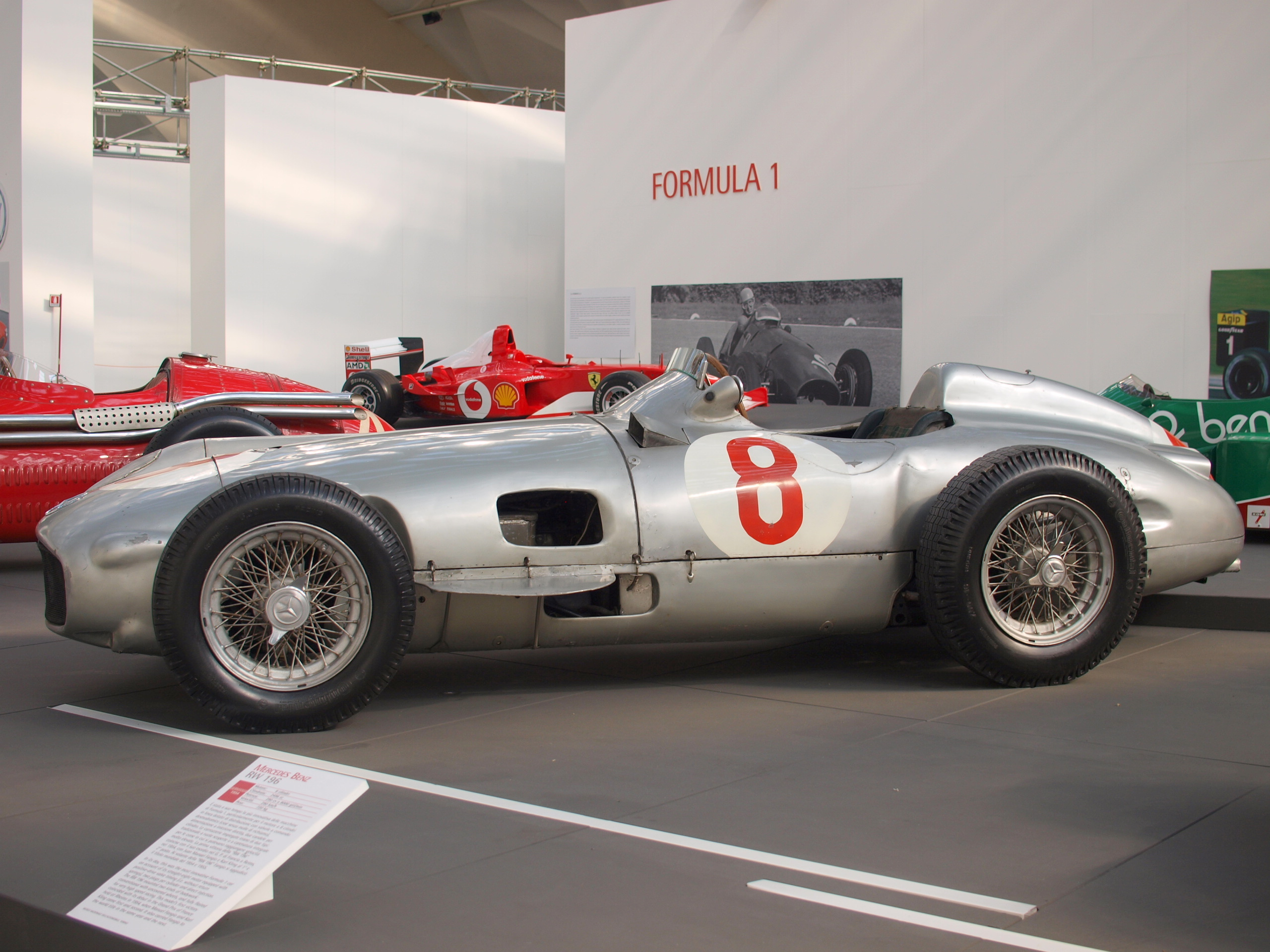
Mercedes Silver Arrow W196

There is however, controversy and doubt regarding this story. It did not appear until 1958, and no reference to it has been found in contemporary sources. It has since been established that von Brauchitsch had raced a streamlined silver SSKL on the AVUS in 1932, which was called a Silver Arrow in live radio coverage. Also, in 1934, both Mercedes and Auto Union had entered the Avusrennen with silver cars. The next big event was the 1934 Eifelrennen, but as few cars complying to the new rules were ready, it was held for Formule Libre, so weight was still not a race-critical issue at that time. By the 1930s, modern stressed-skin aircraft fuselage construction was already using polished and unpainted aluminium panels for streamlining and to save weight. Neubauer's 1958 autobiography has been shown to include several embellished stories and dubious claims, including a fabricated hoax surrounding the 1933 Tripoli Grand Prix, where he falsely accused several drivers of "fixing" the race.

A historical connection to the Neubauer's story appeared in 2023 with the introduction of the Mercedes-AMG F1 W14 E Performance Formula One car. At the launch, held on 15 February 2023, the W14 was revealed to have a black livery, much like its predecessors, the Mercedes F1 W11 of 2020 and the W12 of 2021, but unlike those aforementioned cars, the black livery on the car is not being primarily used to promote diversity, but to save weight after the team admitted to struggling with excess weight with its 2022 car, the W13, which had a traditional silver-painted livery. The black colour was created by leaving most of the parts as unpainted raw carbon whilst some others (mainly the top of the nose and the engine cover) are painted with matte black paint.

== Performance ==
Mercedes-Benz W154
Mercedes-Benz W154 at Goodwood Festival of Speed 2009

By 1937, the supercharged engine of a Mercedes-Benz W125 attained an output of 646 hp (475 kW), a figure not greatly exceeded in Grand Prix Racing until the early 1980s, when turbo-charged engines were common in Formula One – although it was at least matched as early as the late 1940s by conventionally fuelled Grand Prix engines like the BRM V16, despite the rules restricting later engines to half the cylinder capacity.

The Silver Arrows of Mercedes and Auto Union cars reached speeds of well over 300 kilometres per hour (186 mph) in 1937, and well over 400 km/h (249 mph) during land speed record runs.

The superiority of these vehicles in international motor racing established the term "Silver Arrow" as a legend, for example by usually winning the first race in which they were entered. The names Rudolf Caracciola, Bernd Rosemeyer, Hermann Lang, and later Stirling Moss and Juan Manuel Fangio, will always be associated with the eras of these racing cars.

Mercedes-Benz recalled its great past in the 1970s with rally cars, and in the 1980s with the Sauber sportscars and DTM touring cars. As well as the 2010 return to F1 racing of AMG-Petronas cars, dominant there since 2014.

== Other car companies ==
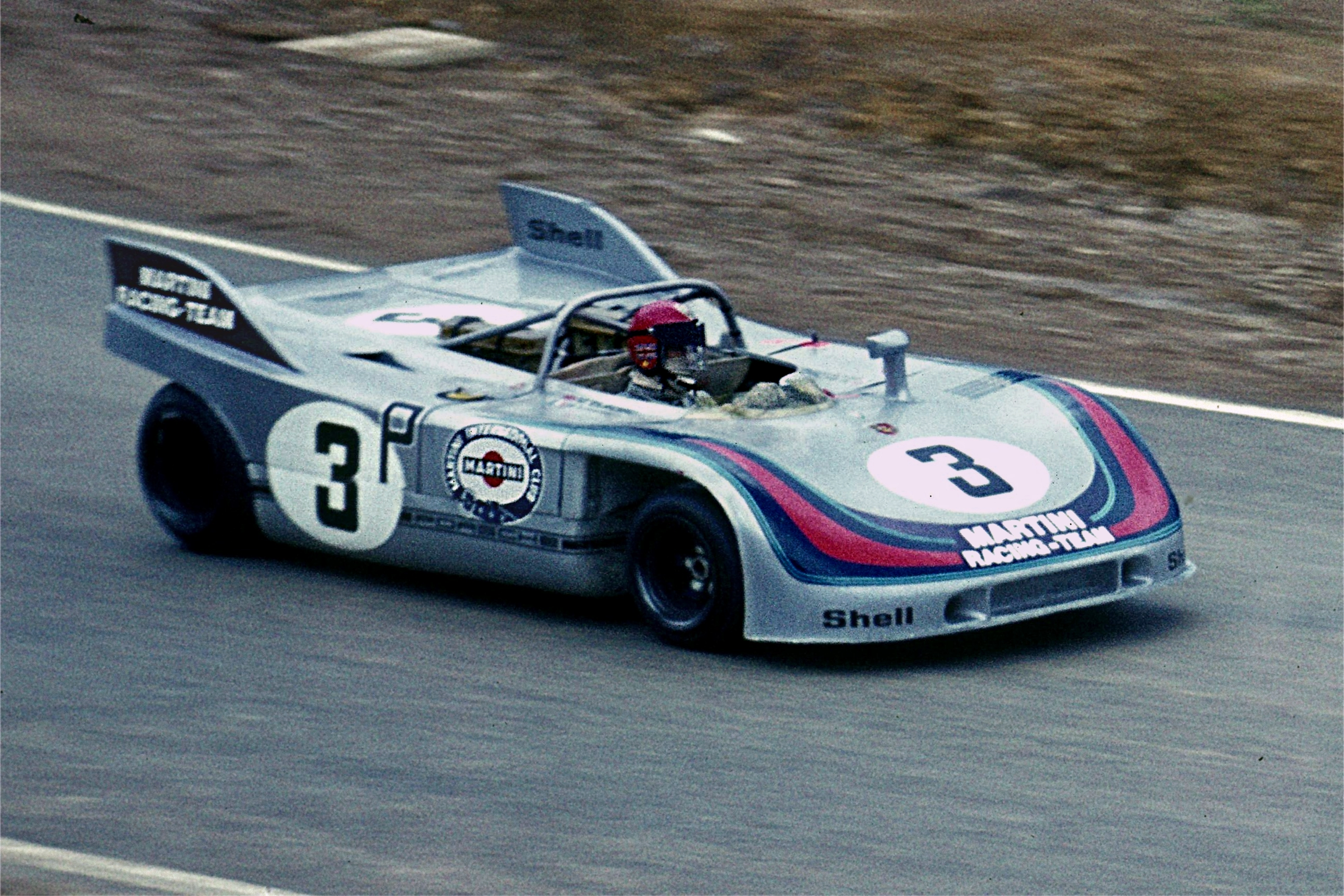
Porsche 908 in silver livery of Martini Racing

Now a traditional colour for road-cars in reference to the Silver Arrows, most German car companies have a shade of silver in their catalogues conforming to Silberpfeil-Grau, or Silver Arrow Grey.

However, Audi and Mercedes-Benz are not the only German car companies who paint their cars in a silver colour. Porsche has also inherited the tradition of silver arrows. However, BMW still paints its cars in the traditional white colour.

At the 1999 Le Mans 24 Hours, a total of seven "Silver Arrows" were entered in the Le Mans Prototype class:

- three Mercedes-Benz CLR
- two British-built LM-GT1 Audi R8C
- two Joest Racing LMP Audi R8R that scored third and fourth.

== Formula One since the 1990s ==
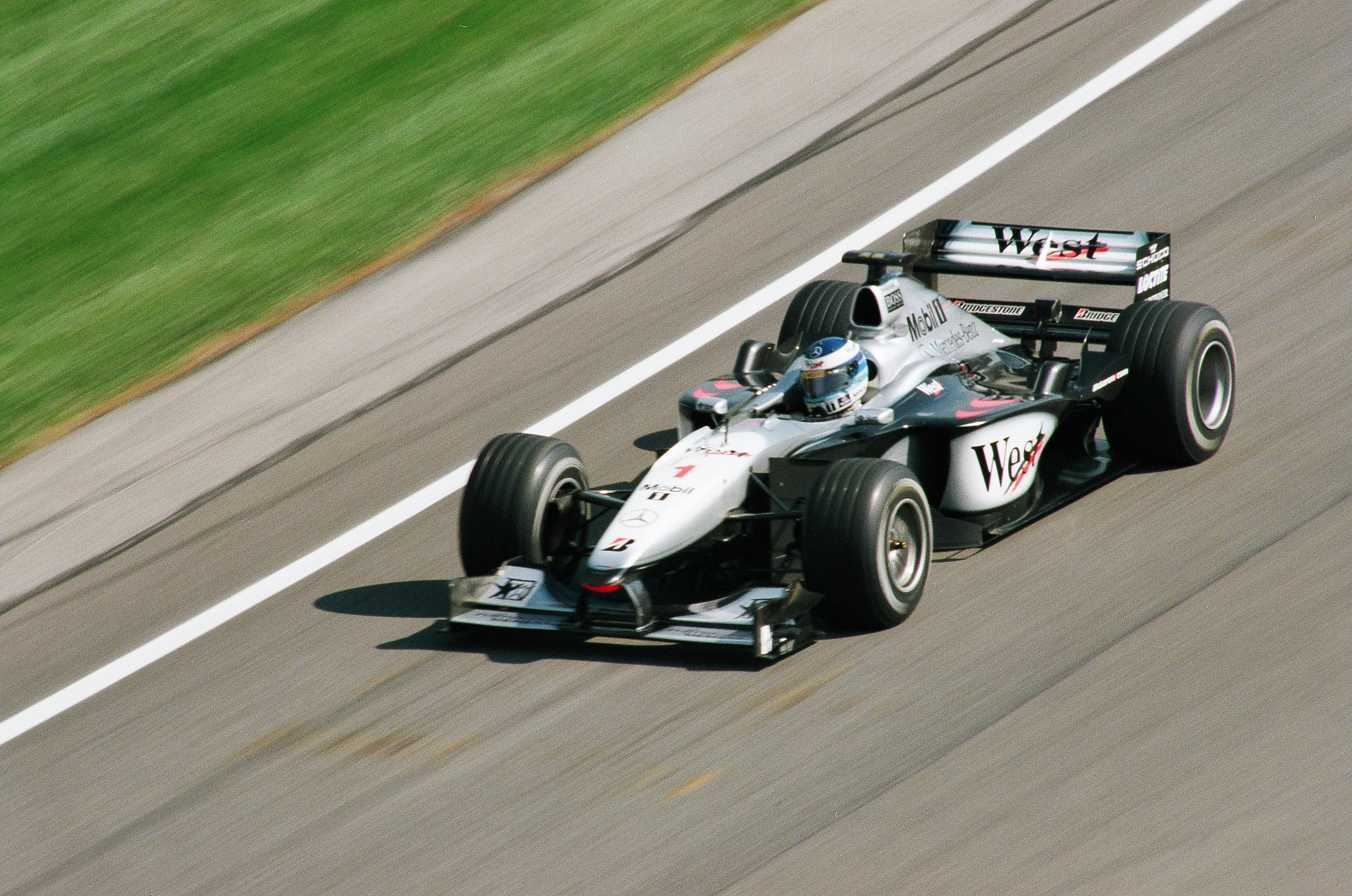
Mika Häkkinen driving for McLaren-Mercedes in 2000

Mercedes-Benz returned to Formula One Grand Prix racing in 1994 as an engine manufacturer, initially partnering the Sauber team before switching to McLaren in 1995. After Marlboro's sponsorship of McLaren ended at the conclusion of 1996, the team began using a silver livery and thus the McLaren-Mercedes cars were often referred to as "Silver Arrows".

In 2010, after purchasing the Brawn GP outfit and rebranding it as Mercedes GP Petronas F1 Team, Mercedes-Benz became a constructor again. Mercedes' cars have been nicknamed "Silver Arrows" by the press and by the team itself. The modern cars race with the majority of their bodies painted in a traditional silver shade, trimmed in Petronas green.

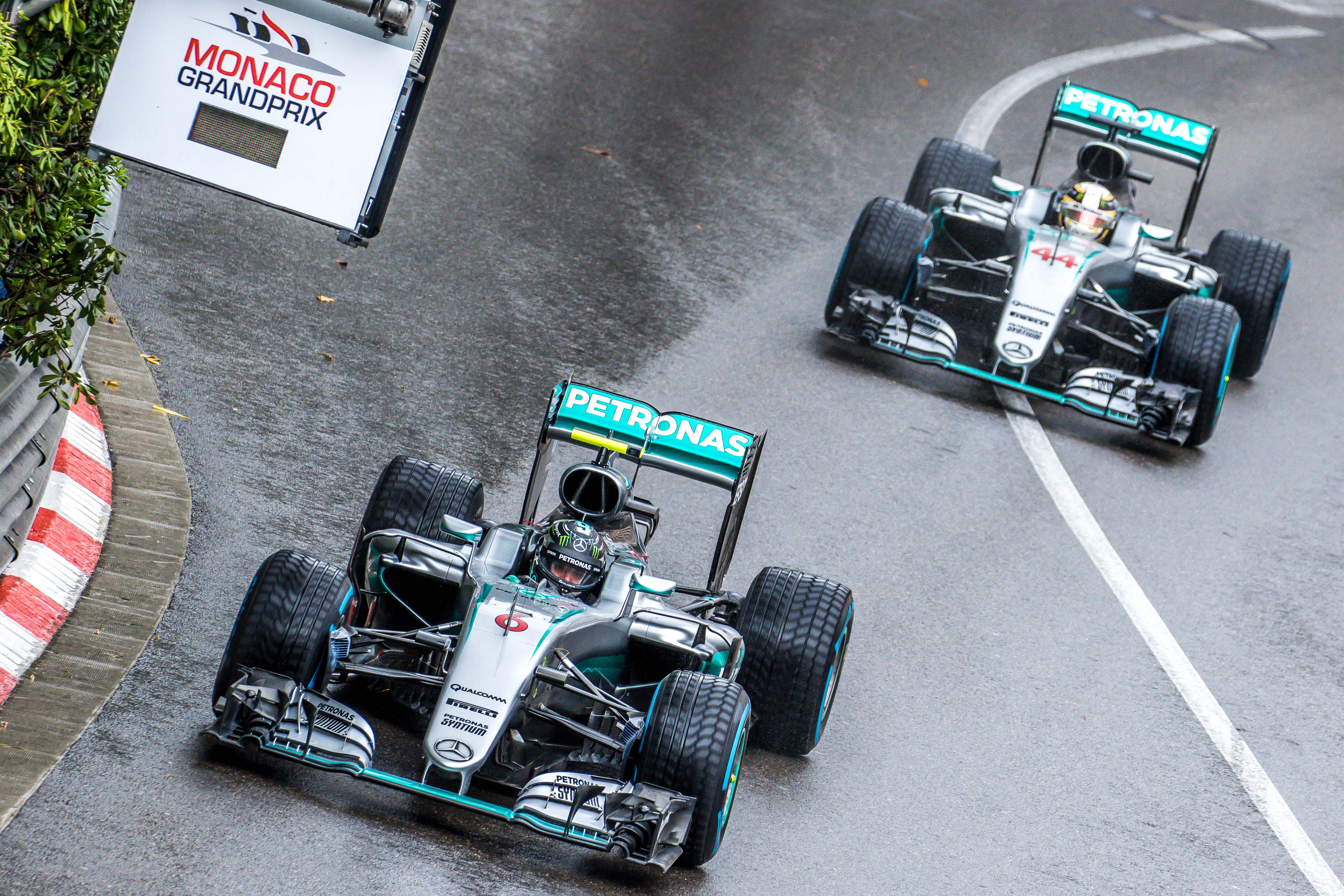
The two Mercedes F1 W07 Hybrids, with driver Nico Rosberg leading teammate Lewis Hamilton in Monaco 2016

For the 2019 German Grand Prix at Hockenheim the cars raced in a special livery honouring the origins of their silver colour and to also celebrate the team's 200th start in F1. The cars were painted in such a way to pay homage to the story of the white paint being peeled away, exposing the shiny silver underneath.

For the 2020 season, while originally going to use a silver livery as usual with a new Ineos sponsored engine intake, Mercedes decided to switch to an all-black livery, following the growing worldwide support for the Black Lives Matter movement, and the postponement of the season. Hamilton prompted the livery change, saying he wanted the team to show its support for the cause through more than just social media posts, which led to the idea to adopt a new livery and launch a drive to improve diversity within the team. The team would continue to use a black livery going into 2021, reverting to a silver livery in 2022. The 2023 car, the Mercedes W14, sported a black livery once again, this time to save weight after struggling with excess weight on the W13. The 2024 car, the Mercedes W15, sported a livery with the famous silver returning to complement the iconic black of recent seasons. The 2025 car, the Mercedes W16, sported a livery similar with the Mercedes W15 except with a silver engine intake instead of the usual Ineos coloured engine intake featured since the Mercedes W11.

== Other sports since the 1990s ==
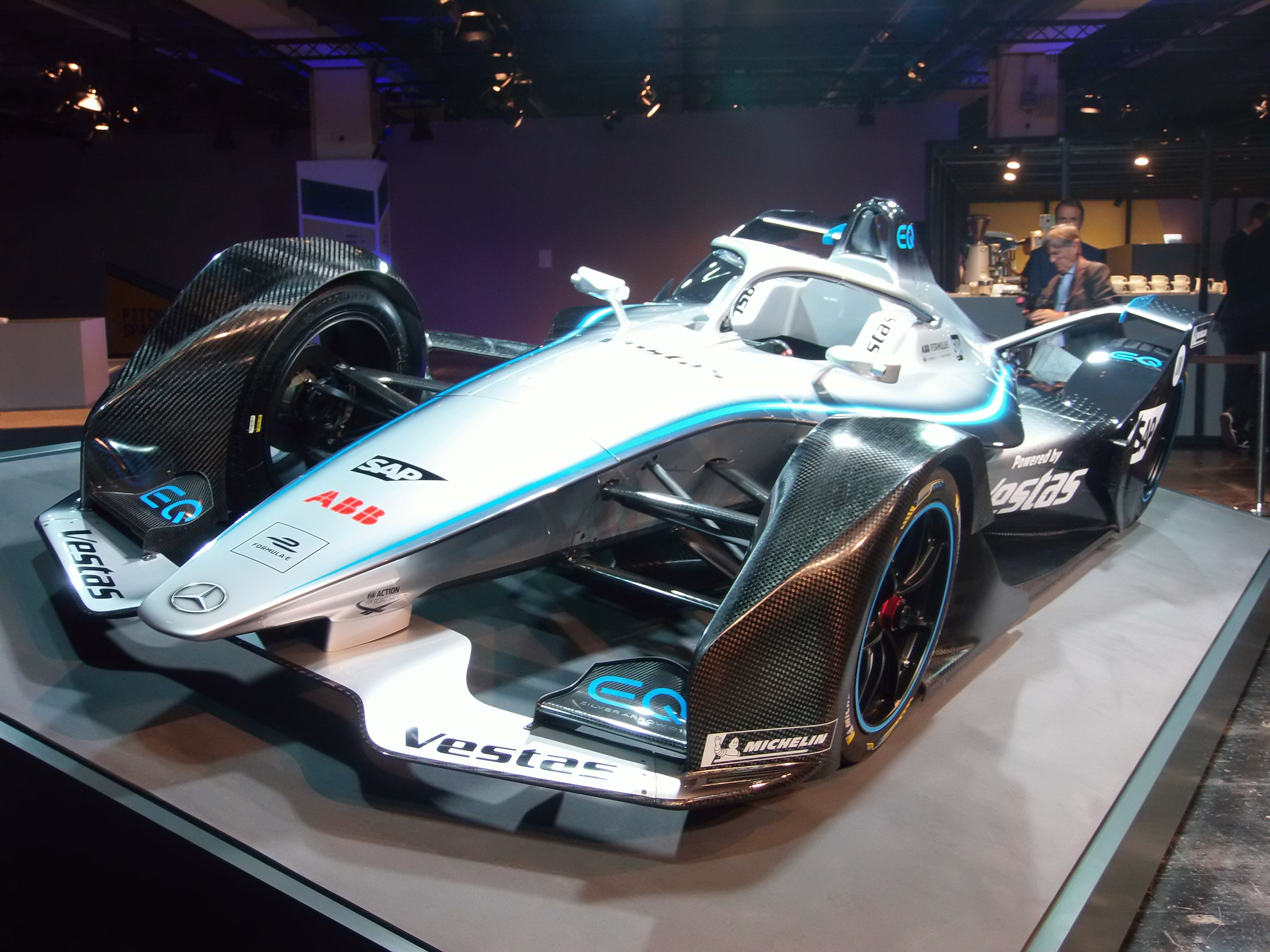
Much like Mercedes' 2020 Formula One car, the Silver Arrow 01 (pictured at IAA 2019) originally sported a silver livery before it was changed to black. Mercedes then brought back this color scheme with the Silver Arrow 02 car.

Mercedes' official debut in Formula E under the name of Mercedes-Benz EQ Formula E Team in the 2019–20 season. Mercedes' first contender, dubbed the Mercedes-Benz EQ Silver Arrow 01, was unveiled in March 2019. It featured a 'teaser' black livery, resembling the HWA car already in competition. The car went on to appear at various events, in promotion of Mercedes' Formula E entry, including the 89th Geneva International Motor Show. In September 2019, the team announced it had signed Danish wind power company Vestas as a principal partner. On 11 September, Mercedes revealed the definitive look of their car (now incorporating metallic silver), along with their new team principal and drivers.

In July 2020, prior the season resuming after the COVID-19 pandemic, Mercedes brought back and updated the pre-season black livery to unify it with the design used on the F1 W11 EQ Performance car. The drivers also wore black racing overalls.

On 29 October 2020, Mercedes revealed the new Silver Arrow 02 car, which returned to the traditional silver livery. In 2021, the team underwent a slight rebrand, now going by the name Mercedes-EQ Formula E Team. The livery would remain Silver until team was taken over by McLaren and returning under new ownership from the 2022–23 season.
