= Mercedes W12 =

Formula One racing car used by Mercedes for 2021

Mercedes-AMG F1 W12 E Performance
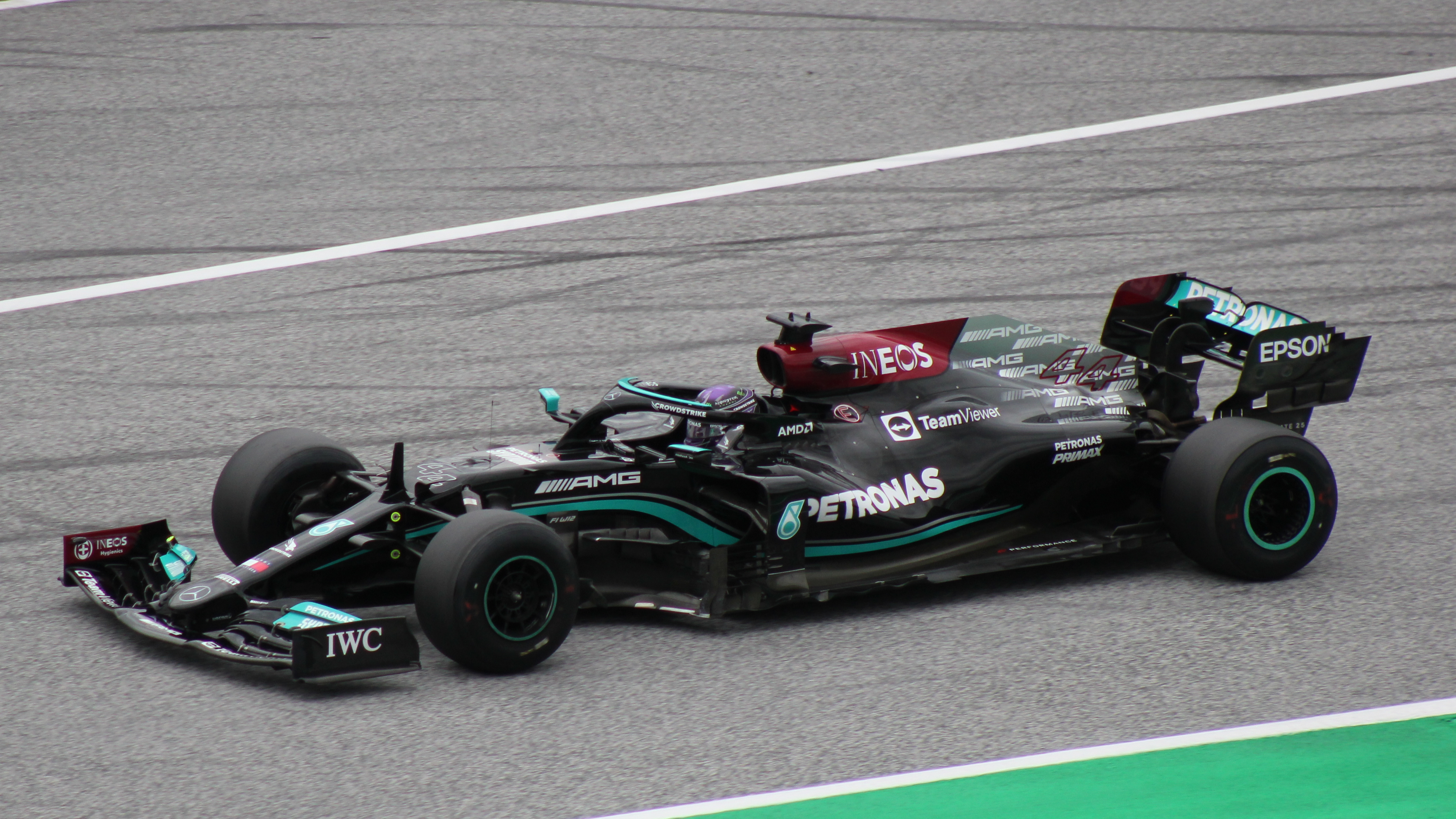
- Lewis Hamilton in the W12 during practice at the Austrian Grand Prix
- Category: Formula 1
- Constructor: Mercedes AMG Petronas F1 Team
- Designers: James Allison (Technical Director); John Owen (Chief Designer); Mike Elliott (Technology Director); Loïc Serra (Performance Director); Ashley Way (Deputy Chief Designer); Giacomo Tortora (Deputy Chief Designer); Emiliano Giangiulio (Head of Vehicle Performance); Jarrod Murphy (Head of Aerodynamics); Eric Blandin (Chief Aerodynamicist); Hywel Thomas (Managing Director - Power Unit); Lorenzo Sassi (Engineering Director - Power Unit)
- Predecessor: Mercedes-AMG F1 W11 EQ Performance
- Successor: Mercedes W13

Technical specifications
- Engine: Mercedes-AMG F1 M12 E Performance 1.6 L V6 mid-engined
- Electric motor: Hybrid Electrically Boosted Single Turbocharger + E-Booster Electric Motor Connected to Crankshaft
- Power: 1,030 hp (770 kW)
- Weight: 752 kg (1,657.9 lb)
- Fuel: Petronas Primax
- Lubricants: Petronas Syntium & Tutela
- Tyres: Pirelli P Zero (dry); Pirelli Cinturato (wet)

Competition history
- Notable entrants: Mercedes AMG Petronas F1 Team
- Notable drivers: 44. (United Kingdom) Lewis Hamilton; 77. (Finland) Valtteri Bottas
- Debut: 2021 Bahrain Grand Prix
- First win: 2021 Bahrain Grand Prix
- Last win: 2021 Saudi Arabian Grand Prix
- Last event: 2021 Abu Dhabi Grand Prix
Races	Wins	Podiums	Poles	F/Laps
22	9	28	9	10
- Constructors' Championships: 1 (2021)
- Drivers' Championships: 0

The Mercedes-AMG F1 W12 E Performance, commonly abbreviated as the Mercedes W12, is a Formula One racing car designed and constructed by the Mercedes-AMG Petronas Formula One Team under the direction of James Allison to compete in the 2021 Formula One World Championship. The car was driven by Lewis Hamilton and Valtteri Bottas. The car is based on the Mercedes-AMG F1 W11 EQ Performance which won the Drivers' and Constructors' Championships the previous season.

Whilst the W12 won the team's eighth consecutive constructors' title, this was the first Mercedes F1 car since the V6 turbo-hybrid era started in 2014 with which Mercedes failed to win the Drivers' Championship with either driver with Hamilton finishing 2nd in the standings.

== Design ==
The W12, whilst still highly competitive, was not as dominant as its predecessor either in pre-season testing or at the 2021 Bahrain Grand Prix. The regulation changes designed to reduce downforce produced by the floor area are said to have compromised lower rake designs, like the W12, more than higher rake designs like that of Red Bull RB16B, along with the banning of the DAS system. Pundits Lawrence Barretto, Scott Mitchell, Mark Hughes and Edd Straw made Red Bull favourites for the first race of the year due to a stronger performance than Mercedes during testing. Although Verstappen did beat the Mercedes cars of Hamilton (2nd) and Bottas (3rd) to pole at the season opener, Hamilton narrowly won from Verstappen, with Bottas finishing third. Williams driver and Mercedes protégé George Russell (who drove the W12's predecessor, the W11, at the 2020 Sakhir Grand Prix) suggested that the W12 and the Williams FW43B could have issues with wind sensitivity and could explain the struggles of Mercedes relative to Red Bull in Bahrain.

== Season summary ==
=== Opening rounds ===
In the season opener at the Bahrain Grand Prix, Hamilton qualified in second place behind Verstappen. When the race got underway, Verstappen managed to stay ahead of Hamilton, but Mercedes decided to undercut Verstappen by pitting Hamilton for hard tyres at the end of lap 14. Hamilton eventually won the race. In the Emilia Romagna Grand Prix, Hamilton achieved his 99th pole position, ahead of Sergio Pérez and Verstappen. In the race, Verstappen started well and overtook Hamilton for first place; Hamilton briefly regained the lead only to lose it again to Verstappen after Hamilton pitted. On lap 31, Hamilton went off-track and through the gravel trap, rejoining in eighth position. A red flag soon followed after a crash between Bottas and George Russell. After a rolling start, Hamilton overtook a majority of the field to finish in second position, over 20 seconds behind the eventual race winner, Verstappen.

At the Portuguese Grand Prix, Valtteri Bottas qualified on pole ahead of Hamilton. Bottas kept the lead of the race onto turn 1; both Hamilton and Verstappen overtook him later in the race. Hamilton maintained the lead to win the race over 29 seconds ahead of Verstappen. Hamilton achieved his 100th pole position at the Spanish Grand Prix. Verstappen took the lead from Hamilton onto turn 1, though Verstappen's first pit stop was slower with Red Bull staying on a one-stop strategy. On lap 59, Hamilton passed Verstappen for the lead and went on to win the race. In the Monaco Grand Prix, Hamilton experienced his worst qualifying session since the 2018 German Grand Prix because of a tyre temperature issue, only managed to qualify in seventh. Issues continued into race day, and he was unable to make any overtakes. However, Hamilton made a late pit stop to set a fastest lap and finished the race seventh, while Bottas retired when the team was unable to remove a wheel during a routine pitstop. At the Azerbaijan Grand Prix, Hamilton qualified second ahead of third-placed Verstappen (who would later experience a race-ending puncture while leading), while Bottas qualified in 10th place, after a red flag prevented him and other drivers from setting a second flying lap in the third and final session. After Verstappen's retirement, which would bring out the second red flag and the second start of the session, Hamilton locked up going into turn 1, having selected the wrong brake mode; he went into the runoff. While Hamilton and Bottas managed to finish the race, both of them failed to finish in the points since the 2012 United States Grand Prix. At the French Grand Prix, Hamilton qualified behind Verstappen for the race. In the opening lap, Hamilton took the lead as Verstappen made a mistake. Hamilton made his first pit stop on lap 19, one lap later than Verstappen. In doing so, Hamilton lost the lead to Verstappen due to the Red Bull driver's undercut performed with his newer tyres. On lap 32, Verstappen pitted for the second time, but Mercedes decided to keep Hamilton out in a one-stop strategy. With five laps remaining, Verstappen took the lead and went onto win the race just 3 seconds ahead of Hamilton, while Bottas finished 4th after being passed by Perez.

=== Mid-season rounds ===
The Styrian and Austrian Grand Prix were both dominated by Red Bull as Verstappen took pole position in both races. In both races, both Mercedes drivers struggled with race pace, but managed to finish on the podium, with Hamilton finishing 2nd in Styria, and Bottas taking 3rd in Styria and 2nd In Austria. This allowed Verstappen to increase his championship lead by 32 points as he achieved his first grand slam.

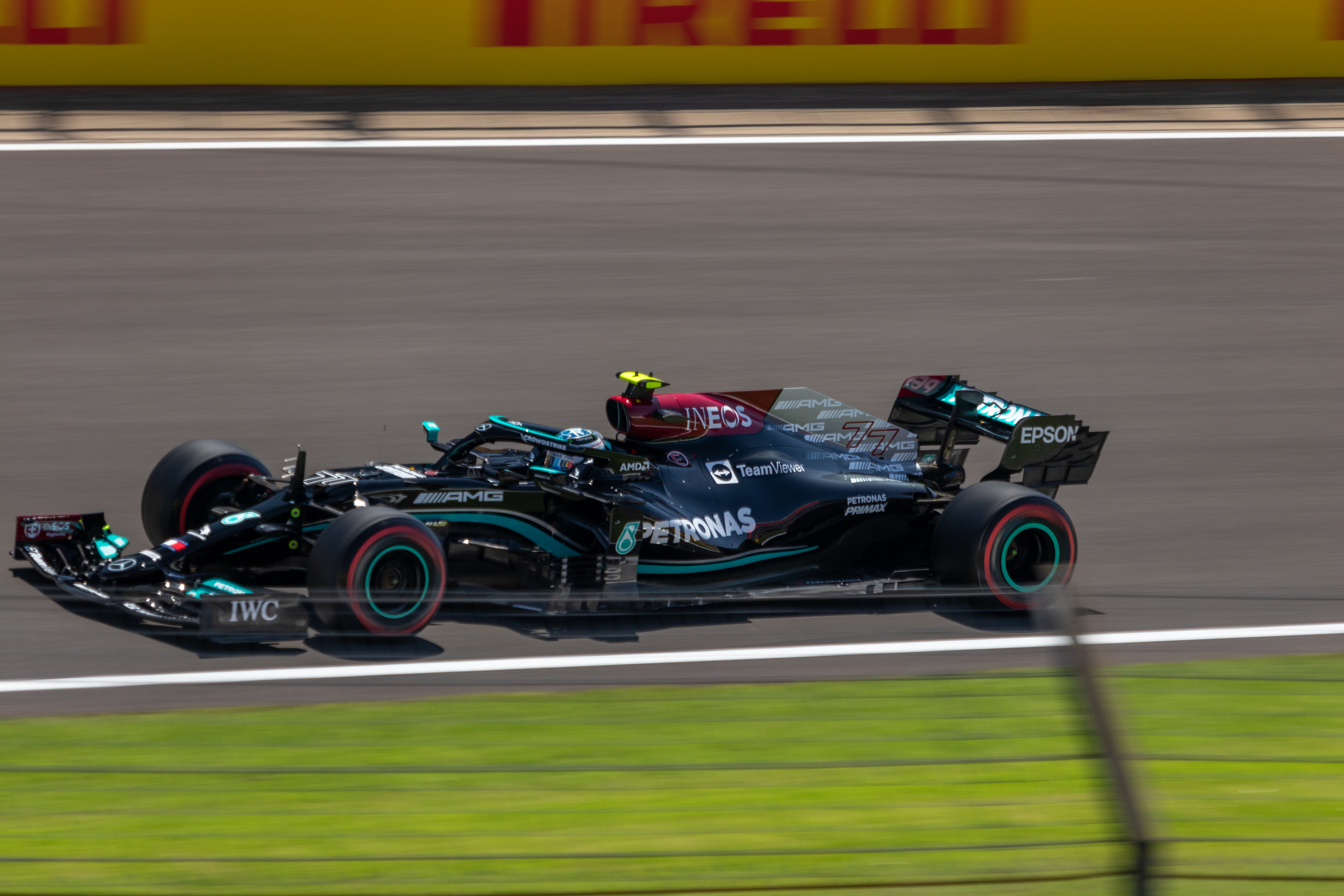
Bottas took third during the British Grand Prix.

At the British Grand Prix, Mercedes introduced a huge upgrade package to increase the car's competitiveness. Hamilton qualified on pole for the first sprint race, while Bottas qualified 3rd. In the sprint, Verstappen made a better start than Hamilton and overtook him before the first corner, leading every lap and winning the sprint with Hamilton second and Bottas third, thus Verstappen started on pole for the Grand Prix itself. In the race, Hamilton made a better start over Verstappen and both contested each other for the lead during the first half of the opening lap. Both repeatedly swapped positions until a first-lap collision at Copse corner, where Hamilton's car experienced understeer and collided with Verstappen, who hit the wall going sideways across the gravel. Hamilton, whose car suffered minor damage, slowed down, allowing Charles Leclerc to take the lead of the race. Due to Verstappen's crash, the race was red flagged. The race was resumed after fifteen minutes as Hamilton was given a ten-second time penalty, with the stewards ruling that Hamilton was predominantly, but not fully, at fault in the collision. Hamilton remained at second position after the restart, pitted and served his time penalty to rejoin fourth. Hamilton immediately overtook Norris and Bottas to claim back second position, taking the lead of the race on lap 50, as Leclerc struggled with an engine issue within his car. Hamilton won his record equalling eighth British Grand Prix.

Hamilton qualified on pole for the Hungarian Grand Prix, which was the second Mercedes front row lockout of the season. The race started on damp conditions; Bottas was involved in a multi-car collision at turn 1. The safety car was bought out and after two laps have been completed behind the safety car, the race was red-flagged so the marshals can clean up the debris. The restart saw Hamilton being the only driver in the grid at the restart while rest of the grid pitted for slick tyres, forcing them to start from the pit lane. Hamilton broke the record for the fewest number of cars on the grid surpassing both the 2005 United States Grand Prix in which the race saw six cars took part after seven teams withdrew from the race, and the 2015 Australian Grand Prix. Hamilton made his first pit stop by the end of lap 4, allowing Esteban Ocon to take the lead. Hamilton made his second stop on lap 19 for Hard compound tyres, which allowed to undercut Verstappen and Daniel Ricciardo, Hamilton fought his way up to fourth position and then pitted on lap 48 to come out behind Fernando Alonso. Hamilton was held behind Alonso for twelve laps, but finally got past Alonso as he locked up his brakes and ran wide at turn 1 on lap 53. Hamilton caught up to Sainz and overtook him to take third position on lap 67 and finished the race behind Ocon and Sebastian Vettel, though he was promoted to second after Vettel's disqualification. This result allowed Hamilton and Mercedes to take the championship lead from Verstappen and Red Bull respectively.

Verstappen took pole from Russell and Hamilton in the Belgian Grand Prix in a wet qualifying session. The race was heavily affected by rain, which initially saw the start delayed by 25 minutes. After two formation laps behind the safety car, the race start was suspended and red-flagged due to poor conditions and lack of visibility. A three-hour delay followed before the race was resumed. After a further three laps, the race was red-flagged again and not restarted, becoming the shortest race in Formula One history and the sixth to award half-points as less than 75% of the race was completed. After a two-lap countback was performed as per regulations, Verstappen won by default, with Russell, scoring his first podium in his Formula One career, in second and Hamilton in third place. As a result, Hamilton's lead in the championship was cut to three points from Verstappen. Hamilton qualified in second position for the Dutch Grand Prix, just 0.038 seconds behind Verstappen. Hamilton set the fastest lap and finished the race in second position behind Verstappen, who won his first home race; Hamilton lost the championship lead again. Bottas came third, overtaking Norris, who finished tenth.

At the Italian Grand Prix, Hamilton qualified in second position for the sprint race, just 0.096 seconds behind Bottas. Hamilton appeared to be struggling during the sprint race, already losing four positions by turn 2, but made up one place to finish fifth at the end of the race. Hamilton was promoted to fourth position as Bottas, who set a lap fast enough for pole position, had to start the race from back of the grid due to exceeding the quota of power unit components. Verstappen and Hamilton collided during the race on lap 24, which saw both drivers retire as Hamilton saw his first retirement since the 2018 Austrian Grand Prix. Bottas went on to finish 3rd behind the two McLaren drivers of Ricciardo and Norris.

Hamilton was the fastest in Q1 and Q2 during qualifying at the Russian Grand Prix, but was unable to set a faster lap time in Q3, due to making contact with the pit wall while on the way to change his tyres to slicks. This resulted in damage to his front wing and he was unable to get his tyres up to temperature. Hamilton was forced to slow down to allow the cars which were on flying laps to pass. A lack of time until the end of the session saw Hamilton qualifying fourth for the race. Hamilton had a bad start, losing six positions before heading into turn 1. Hamilton overtook Alonso in the following lap. On lap 48, rain began to fall as Hamilton immediately pitted for Intermediate tyres while the race leader, Norris, stayed out on his slicks. On lap 51, Norris' choice to stay out on slick tyres failed him; he ran wide at turn 5, allowing Hamilton to take the lead of the race. Hamilton's eventual victory allowed him to score his 100th victory in his Formula One career, as well as the championship lead from Verstappen.

=== Closing rounds ===
Hamilton was the fastest in qualifying in Turkey, but was dropped down the grid because of a penalty due to a power unit component change. Bottas was promoted to pole position and won the race, his first of the season. Hamilton was forced to make a late pit stop, which cost him couple of places to finish the race in fifth position. In doing so Hamilton was frustrated and lost his championship lead again to Verstappen.

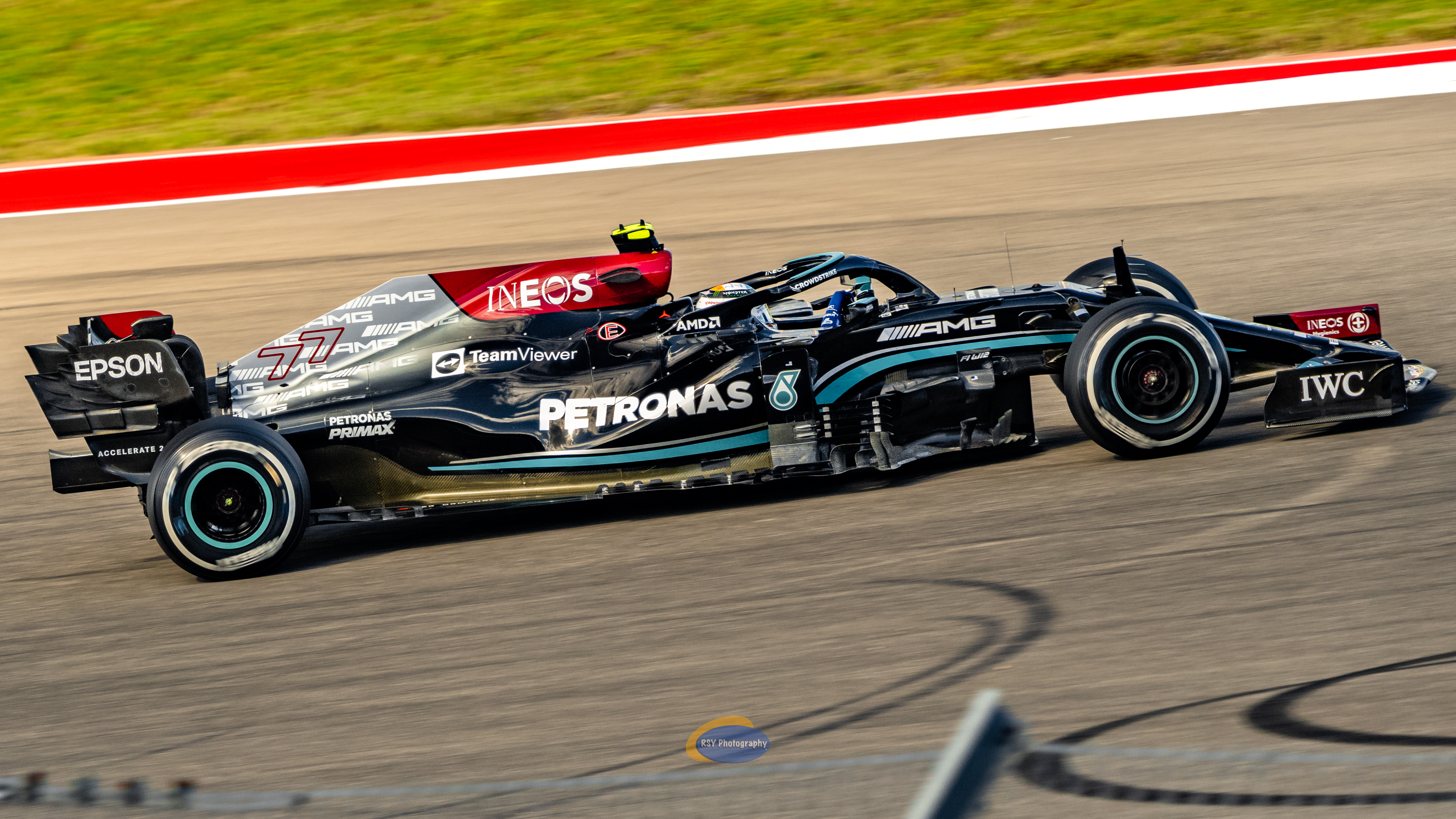
Bottas during the United States Grand Prix.

At the United States Grand Prix, Hamilton qualified in second position, just behind Verstappen for the race. Hamilton took the lead into turn 1, but lost it after the pit stops. Hamilton, who set the fastest lap, finished the race in second position, just 1.3 seconds behind Verstappen. Bottas qualified 4th but was forced to take yet another engine penalty, thus starting 9th. Bottas struggled with dirty air throughout the race, which made overtaking difficult, but he managed to climb back to 6th after overtaking the Ferrari of Carlos Sainz Jr. on the last lap.

Hamilton qualified in second position again for the Mexico City Grand Prix, but this time Bottas was on pole position. Verstappen immediately took the lead of the race onto turn 1 from Bottas, where he suffered a poor start in the race and was tagged by Daniel Ricciardo going into Turn 1, sending him to the back of the field. Having suffered from a poor pitstop and being stuck behind Ricciardo for much of the race, Mercedes called him into the pits so he can set a fastest lap. The additional point allowed Mercedes to maintain its lead over Red Bull in the constructors' championship. Hamilton stood behind Verstappen for the entire race, and managed to secure second from Pérez, who was chasing close behind him.

In the São Paulo Grand Prix, Hamilton qualified on pole position, half a second ahead of Verstappen. After the session, he was disqualified from qualifying; stewards claimed his car's DRS opening slot was larger than the permitted 85 millimeters. As a result, Hamilton was forced to start from the back of the grid for the sprint. In the sprint race, Hamilton started from back and made up fifteen places to finish the race fifth just from 24 laps. Bottas jumped Verstappen at the start, going on to win the sprint race. Hamilton was dropped to tenth position for the race start due to taking another new engine for the race. In the race, Hamilton caught up to the race leader, Verstappen, by lap 48. Hamilton tried to get past Verstappen, but was pushed wide by the Dutchman; the stewards claimed no investigation was necessary for his aggressive move. On lap 59, Hamilton finally got past Verstappen to win the race.In the race, Bottas was passed by both Red Bulls on the opening lap after contact with Verstappen. Bottas let Hamilton past and overtook Pérez again during the pit-stop phase, ending the race in third.

Hamilton qualified on pole position for the Qatar Grand Prix, which took place for the first time in the Formula One calendar. He led every single lap in the race, winning 25 seconds ahead of Verstappen. This was Hamilton's 30th different circuit where he has won a Grand Prix.

The Saudi Arabian Grand Prix was another rookie Grand Prix for the Formula One calendar. Hamilton set the pole position lap in his first attempt, in the second one he was unable to improve his time as he had a slide, forcing him to abort his flying lap. However, Verstappen aborted his second flying lap due to a mistake, thus Hamilton achieved pole position. On lap 37 of the race, Hamilton caught up to Verstappen and tried to overtake him at turn 1. Verstappen defended by going of the track, almost crashing onto Hamilton; earlier, Verstappen was told to give back his position to Hamilton, but the Mercedes driver was not informed. As soon as Verstappen slowed down to let him go, Hamilton crashed onto the back of Verstappen's car. As a result, Hamilton slightly damaged his car's front wing. Verstappen was given a ten-second time penalty for slowing down in the middle of the track. On lap 42, Verstappen finally let Hamilton get past, but immediately and illegally overtook Hamilton in the following corner. On lap 43, Hamilton got past Verstappen to win the first ever Saudi Arabian Grand Prix, also setting the fastest lap of the race.

The Abu Dhabi Grand Prix was the title decider of the season, ending with significant controversy. After the Saudi Arabian Grand Prix, both championship contenders were level on points; Hamilton qualified in second position, behind Verstappen, who was slipstreamed by his teammate to snatch pole position. In the race, Hamilton gained the race lead into turn 1. He was able to produce a gap to Verstappen of 11 seconds, until Red Bull's second driver Pérez purposefully held up Hamilton. This allowed Verstappen to close the gap to 1.3 seconds before Hamilton overtook Pérez and increased the gap to comfortably led the race. On lap 53, the safety car was deployed. Hamilton, was unable to pit for new tyres without risking his race lead, staying out while Verstappen pitted for fresh softs. Race director Michael Masi decided to let all lapped cars between Hamilton and Verstappen unlap themselves and restart the race for one final lap. With fresh soft compound tyres, Verstappen overtook Hamilton into turn 5. Hamilton crossed the finish line in second position to finish second in the World Driver's Championship, where Bottas ended up in third. Mercedes thereby won their eighth consecutive World Constructor's Championship, a new record.

== Post-competition ==
Following its competitive career, the car was used at the opening of the Las Vegas Grand Prix strip (in the livery of the 2022 car, the W13).

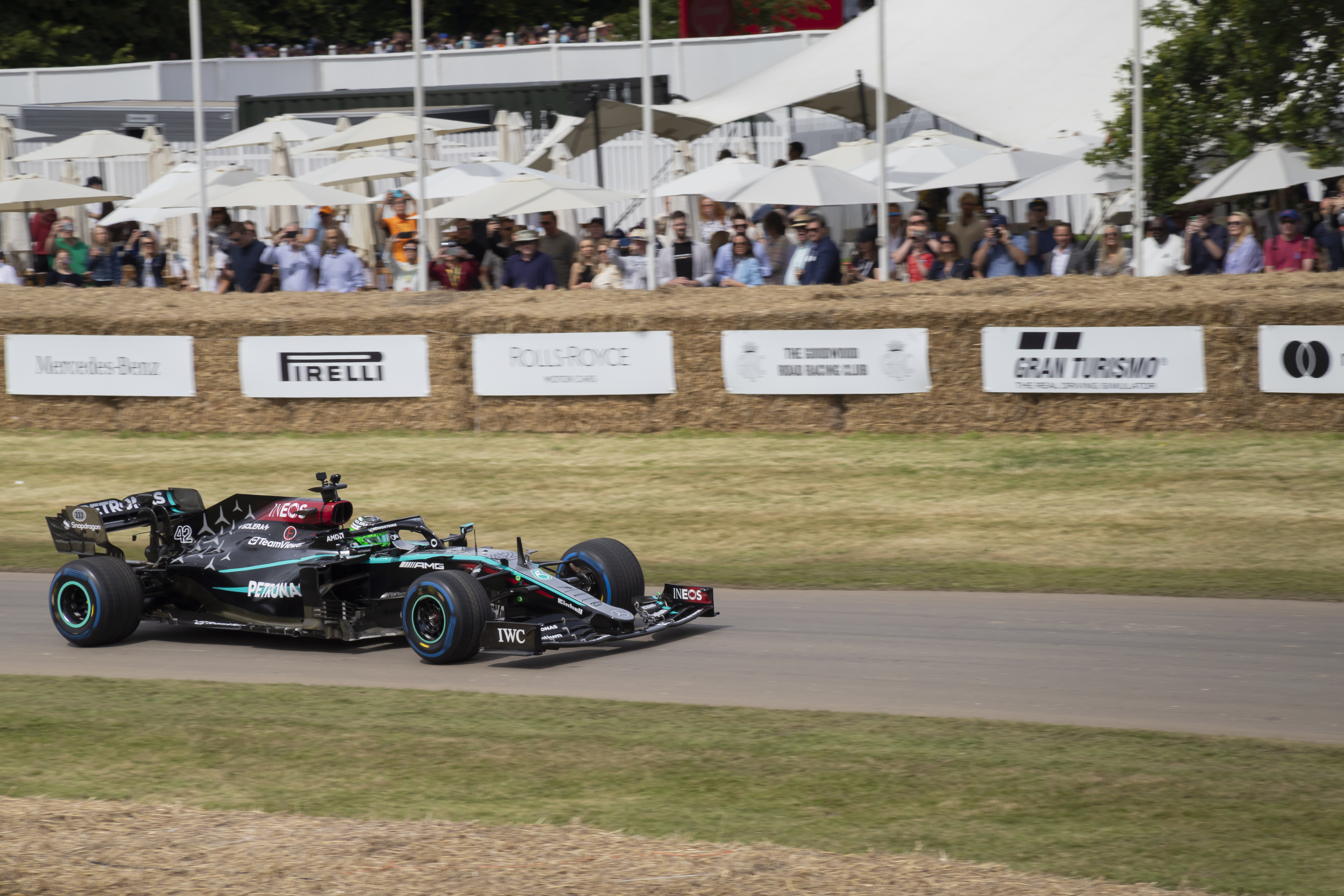
Gutiérrez driving the W12 (in the livery of the 2024 car, the W15) at the 2024 Goodwood Festival of Speed.

The car was also driven at the 2023 Goodwood Festival of Speed (in the livery of the 2023 car, the W14), driven by Mercedes-AMG Petronas F1 Team development driver Esteban Gutiérrez.

In 2024 ahead of the Miami Grand Prix, Lewis Hamilton drove the car (in the livery of the 2024 car, the W15) down Fifth Avenue as a promotional event with WhatsApp.

In April 2026, Mercedes development driver and 2025 F1 Academy champion Doriane Pin drove the car for 76 laps as part of a private test at Silverstone Circuit.

== Complete Formula One results ==
(key)

Year	Entrant	Power unit	Tyres	Driver name	Grands Prix																						Points	WCC pos.
Year	Entrant	Power unit	Tyres	Driver name	BHR	EMI	POR	ESP	MON	AZE	FRA	STY	AUT	GBR	HUN	BEL^{‡}	NED	ITA	RUS	TUR	USA	MXC	SAP	QAT	SAU	ABU	Points	WCC pos.
2021	Mercedes AMG Petronas F1 Team	Mercedes-AMG F1 M12 E Performance	P	(Finland) Valtteri Bottas	3^{F}	Ret	3^{P}^{F}	3	Ret	12	4	3	2	3^{3}	Ret	12	3	3^{1}	5	1^{P}^{F}	6	15^{P}^{F}	3^{1 P}	Ret	3	6	613.5	1st
2021	Mercedes AMG Petronas F1 Team	Mercedes-AMG F1 M12 E Performance	P	(United Kingdom) Lewis Hamilton	1	2^{P}^{F}	1	1^{P}	7^{F}	15	2	2^{F}	4	1^{2}	2^{P}	3	2^{F}	Ret	1	5	2^{F}	2	1	1^{P}	1^{P}^{F}	2	613.5	1st

Notes

^{‡} Half points awarded as less than 75% of race distance completed.
