= Mercedes W16 =

2025 Formula One car

Mercedes-AMG F1 W16 E Performance
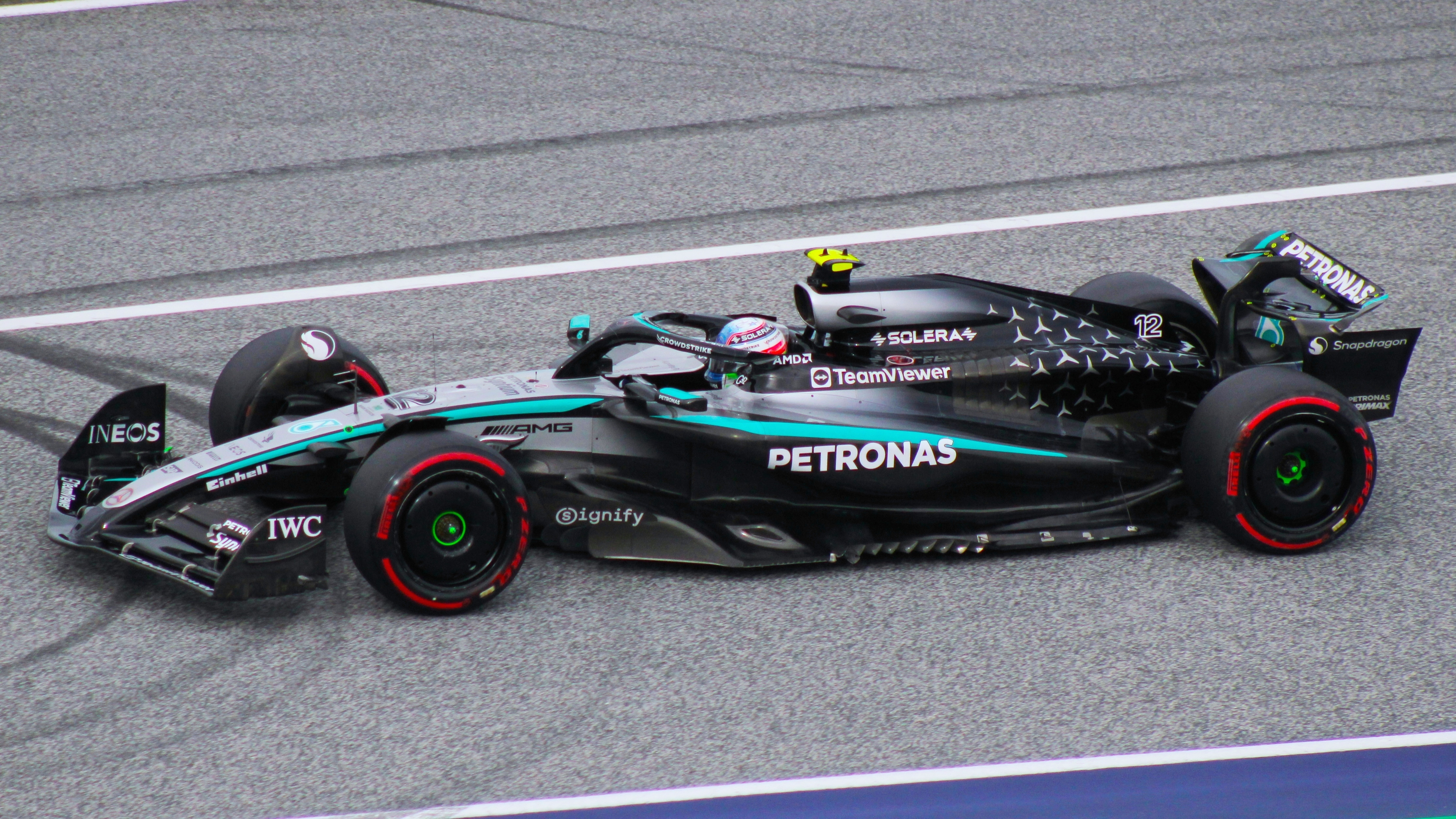
- Kimi Antonelli driving the W16 during the Austrian Grand Prix
- Category: Formula One
- Designers: James Allison (Technical Director); Simone Resta (Deputy Technical Director); John Owen (Car Design Director); Jarrod Murphy (Aerodynamics Director); David Nelson (Performance Director); Giacomo Tortora (Engineering Director); Ashley Way (Chief Engineer - Car Design); Hywel Thomas (Managing Director - Power Unit); Lorenzo Sassi (Engineering Director - Power Unit)
- Predecessor: Mercedes W15
- Successor: Mercedes W17

Technical specifications
- Suspension (front): Carbon fibre wishbone and pushrod-activated springs and dampers
- Suspension (rear): Carbon fibre wishbone and pushrod-activated springs and dampers
- Length: over 5,000 mm (197 in)
- Width: 2,000 mm (79 in)
- Height: 950 mm (37 in)
- Engine: Mercedes-AMG F1 M16 E Performance 1.6 L (98 cu in) direct injection V6 turbocharged engine limited to 15,000 RPM in a mid-mounted, rear-wheel drive layout
- Electric motor: Motor Generator Unit Kinetic (MGU-K) and thermal energy recovery systems
- Transmission: Mercedes 8-speed hydraulic actuated semi automatic sequential gearbox, + 1 reverse gear
- Weight: 800 kg (including driver, excluding fuel)
- Fuel: Petronas Primax
- Lubricants: Petronas Tutela
- Tyres: Pirelli P Zero (Dry/Slick); Pirelli Cinturato (Wet/Treaded); with BBS forged magnesium wheels: 18"

Competition history
- Notable entrants: Mercedes-AMG Petronas F1 Team
- Notable drivers: 12. (Italy) Kimi Antonelli; 63. (United Kingdom) George Russell
- Debut: 2025 Australian Grand Prix
- First win: 2025 Canadian Grand Prix
- Last win: 2025 Singapore Grand Prix
- Last event: 2025 Abu Dhabi Grand Prix
Races	Wins	Podiums	Poles	F/Laps
24	2	12	2	6

The Mercedes-AMG F1 W16 E Performance, commonly known as the Mercedes W16, is a Formula One racing car designed and built by the Mercedes-AMG Petronas F1 Team to compete in the 2025 Formula One World Championship. It was driven by George Russell, in his fourth consecutive season with the team, partnering rookie driver Kimi Antonelli, who replaced seven-time World Drivers' Champion Lewis Hamilton, who departed for Ferrari following the end of the 2024 season. As such, this is the first Mercedes F1 car since the F1 W03, from the 2012 season, not to be driven by Hamilton. It took two wins, twelve podiums, two pole positions and six fastest laps.

== Background ==
The W16 is the successor to the W15 from the previous year that took four victories, namely in Austria, Great Britain, Belgium and Las Vegas. Despite taking four wins the previous season, the W15 was criticised by George Russell, who labeled it as the "most inconsistent" car Mercedes has ever had. The team finished the season in fourth in the World Constructors' Championship, trailing behind Red Bull by 121 points but 374 points ahead of Aston Martin.

=== Initial design ===
Russell finished second in Las Vegas, an evening where both drivers finished on the podium for the second time that season.

Mercedes has traditionally struggled during the ground-effect era from the 2022 season, starting with the W13 with its "zero-pod" philosophy. With the W14, the car's suspension design hindered the team's ability to maximize the effectiveness of its underbody aerodynamics. To compensate, the team had to raise the car's ride height throughout the season, which put them at a disadvantage compared to their competitors. The W16 appeared to solve the suspension problems, but also produced a knock-on effect of inducing inconsistent balance.

Technical Director James Allison has been "very involved" in the design of the W16.

=== Livery ===
As with the other teams, Mercedes revealed the W16's livery at a bespoke event on 18 February 2025. It was similar to the W15's livery, but with minor changes, including a longer section of silver paint on the side of the car's nose. Mercedes has run one special livery at the British Grand Prix, which coincided with the launch of the AMG marque's Concept AMG GT XX. The livery added orange colours to the car.

== Complete Formula One results ==
Key

Key
Colour	Result
Gold	Winner
Silver	Second place
Bronze	Third place
Green	Other points position
Blue	Other classified position
Blue	Not classified, finished (NC)
Purple	Not classified, retired (Ret)
Red	Did not qualify (DNQ)
Black	Disqualified (DSQ)
White	Did not start (DNS)
White	Race cancelled (C)
Blank	Did not practice (DNP)
Blank	Excluded (EX)
Blank	Did not arrive (DNA)
Blank	Withdrawn (WD)
Blank	Did not enter (empty cell)
Annotation	Meaning
P	Pole position
F	Fastest lap
Superscript number	Points-scoring position in sprint

Year	Entrant	Power unit	Tyres	Driver name	Grands Prix																								Points	WCC pos.
Year	Entrant	Power unit	Tyres	Driver name	AUS	CHN	JPN	BHR	SAU	MIA	EMI	MON	ESP	CAN	AUT	GBR	BEL	HUN	NED	ITA	AZE	SIN	USA	MXC	SAP	LVG	QAT	ABU	Points	WCC pos.
2025	Mercedes-AMG Petronas F1 Team	Mercedes-AMG F1 M16 E Performance 1.6 V6 t	P	(United Kingdom) George Russell	3	3^{4}	5	2	5	3^{4}	7	11	4	1^{P}^{F}	5	10	5	3^{F}	4	5	2	1^{P}	6^{2}	7^{F}	4^{3}	2	6^{2}	5	469	2nd
2025	Mercedes-AMG Petronas F1 Team	Mercedes-AMG F1 M16 E Performance 1.6 V6 t	P	(Italy) Kimi Antonelli	4	6^{7}	6^{F}	11	6	6^{7}	Ret	18	Ret	3	Ret	Ret	16^{F}	10	16	9	4	5	13^{8 F}	6	2^{2}	3	5^{6}	15	469	2nd
