= Mercedes W15 =

2024 Formula One car

Mercedes-AMG F1 W15 E Performance
- The W15 driven by Lewis Hamilton during the Dutch Grand Prix
- Category: Formula One
- Designers: James Allison (Technical Director); John Owen (Car Design Director); Jarrod Murphy (Aerodynamics Director); David Nelson (Performance Director); Ashley Way (Chief Engineer); Giacomo Tortora (Engineering Director); Emiliano Giangiulio (Head of Vehicle Performance); Gioacchino Vino (Chief Aerodynamicist) Hywel Thomas (Managing Director - Power Unit) Lorenzo Sassi (Engineering Director - Power Unit)
- Predecessor: Mercedes W14
- Successor: Mercedes W16

Technical specifications
- Suspension (front): Carbon fibre wishbone and pushrod-activated springs and dampers
- Suspension (rear): Carbon fibre wishbone and pushrod-activated springs and dampers
- Length: over 5,000 mm (197 in)
- Width: 2,000 mm (79 in)
- Height: 950 mm (37 in)
- Engine: Mercedes-AMG F1 M15 E Performance 1.6 L (98 cu in) direct injection V6 turbocharged engine limited to 15,000 RPM in a mid-mounted, rear-wheel drive layout
- Electric motor: Motor Generator Unit Kinetic (MGU-K) and thermal energy recovery systems
- Transmission: 8-speed hydraulic actuated semi automatic sequential gearbox, + 1 reverse gear
- Weight: 798 kg (1,759 lb)
- Fuel: Petronas Primax
- Lubricants: Petronas Tutela
- Tyres: Pirelli P Zero (Dry/Slick); Pirelli Cinturato (Wet/Treaded); with BBS forged magnesium wheels: 18"

Competition history
- Notable entrants: Mercedes-AMG Petronas F1 Team
- Notable drivers: 44. (United Kingdom) Lewis Hamilton; 63. (United Kingdom) George Russell
- Debut: 2024 Bahrain Grand Prix
- First win: 2024 Austrian Grand Prix
- Last win: 2024 Las Vegas Grand Prix
- Last event: 2024 Abu Dhabi Grand Prix
Races	Wins	Podiums	Poles	F/Laps
24	4	9	4	4

The Mercedes-AMG F1 W15 E Performance, commonly known as the Mercedes W15, is a Formula One racing car designed and built by the Mercedes-AMG Petronas F1 Team to compete in the 2024 Formula One World Championship.

This was the first Mercedes car fully designed under British designer and engineer James Allison since his return as technical director in 2023. The W15 was raced by returning drivers George Russell, and seven-time World Drivers' Champion Lewis Hamilton, the latter in his final season with the team. Andrea Kimi Antonelli served as a test driver.

The W15 achieved four race wins, four pole positions, four fastest laps and nine podium finishes; Russell won the Austrian and Las Vegas Grands Prix, whilst Hamilton won the British and Belgian Grands Prix. Mercedes finished in fourth place in the World Constructors' Championship, their lowest finish since 2012.

== Background and design ==
Mercedes finished second in the 2023 season with the W14, behind Red Bull, finishing ahead of Ferrari by 3 points.

Team Principal Toto Wolff stated that the team would change the concept for the W15, including the way they laid out the chassis, weight distribution, and aerodynamics. Wolff added that changing almost all components could give the team its best chance to contend in 2024. Before the off-season break, Hamilton stated the team's mood was "positive", and he checked the team's progress with the W15 in their wind tunnel.

Technical Director James Allison labelled the W15 project as "ambitious" and stated the team had made a lot of progress over the winter. Allison later clarified that the late introduction of sidepods starting from the 2023 Monaco Grand Prix wasn't the main shortcoming in 2023, and added that the W15 would look significantly different from its predecessors. Wolff recounted that the team's simulator driver, Anthony Davidson, tested the W15 in the simulator, driving it in Melbourne and spoke favorably of the results, stating "The car feels like a car for the first time in two years."

The W15 was unveiled at Silverstone Circuit on 14 February. The car sported a mostly bare carbon fibre and black livery, though with a silver nose cone and their title sponsor Petronas's teal as an accent. The car had a different sidepod shape, and the team switched from pull-rod suspension to push-rod suspension. The team focused on resolving W14's unpredictable axle issue. The cockpit position shifted further backward, something that Hamilton has been vocal about starting from their 2022 car. Hamilton and Russell drove in a brief 15 km demo day at Silverstone with the first proper running held as part of their 200 km filming day in Bahrain before pre-season testing commenced.

== Season summary ==
=== Pre-season testing ===
Pre-season testing commenced on 21 February with Russell driving the entire day. Russell stated "The W15 felt nicer to drive compared to the W14. We will continue to maximize our time here to gather data to find the sweet spot."

On Day 2, Hamilton completed over 100 laps and confirmed his teammate's positive reception of the car.

The team ended their pre-season testing on a good note with both drivers finding the car much more stable and more predictable compared to its predecessor. Trackside engineering chief Andrew Shovlin was encouraged by the strong showing during the pre-season testing. Shovlin stated "The team has put in a lot of work to address the handling issues with the W14. So it's great to see that we have put these issues behind us."

=== Opening rounds ===
The season started in Bahrain with a mixed qualifying session as Russell qualified third while Hamilton was ninth. Russell finished fifth after suffering a power unit heating issue that required him to lift and coast. Hamilton finished seventh after suffering an issue with his seat, which suddenly cracked midway through the race. Wolff claimed the team was losing around 0.5 seconds per lap due to the engine issue, which also hampered their customer team, Williams.

In the Saudi Arabian Grand Prix, Russell and Hamilton qualified seventh and eighth. Hamilton gambled by not pitting due to an early safety car, running as high as third and defending against Oscar Piastri for 20 laps. Russell finished sixth, 40 seconds behind winner Max Verstappen. Hamilton stated, "It's definitely not fun finishing ninth despite pushing as hard as I could, but we were lacking in the high-speed sections."

In the Australian Grand Prix, Hamilton was knocked out of Q2 in Australia for the first time since 2010. Russell qualified seventh, maintaining his Q3 appearance for the third consecutive race weekend. Hamilton retired early due to a power unit failure while Russell crashed out in a penultimate lap incident with Fernando Alonso. The result made Wolff want "to punch himself in the nose". The race marked the first double DNF for the team since the 2018 Austrian Grand Prix.

In Japan, Hamilton qualified seventh and Russell ninth, but finished ninth and seventh, respectively.

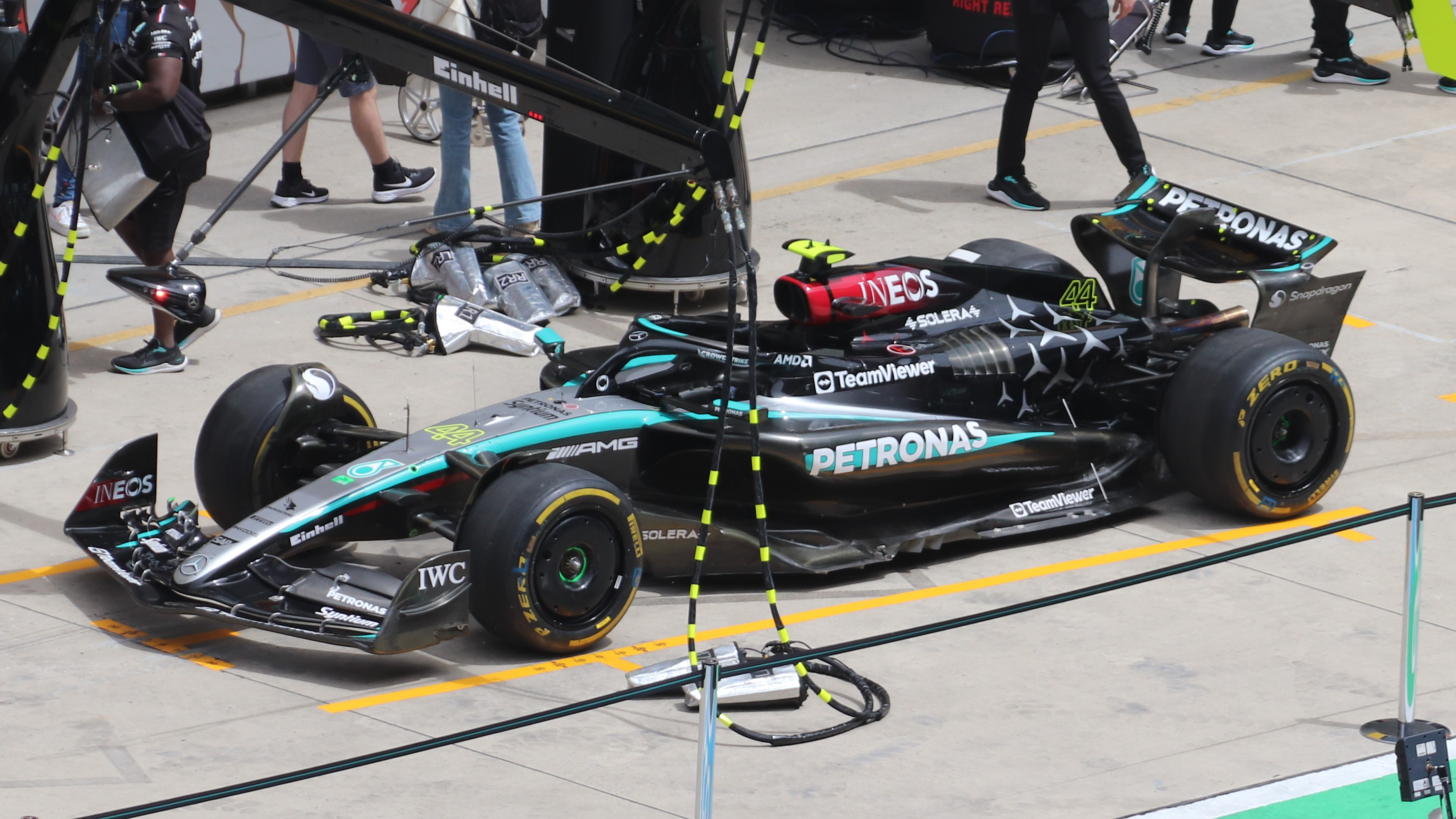
Hamilton's W15 on display at the Chinese Grand Prix

During sprint qualifying for the Chinese Grand Prix, Hamilton qualified second, while Russell qualified eleventh. During the sprint race, Hamilton overtook polesitter Lando Norris in the first corner and held the lead for a couple of laps before he was overtaken by Verstappen. Hamilton finished the sprint in second place. Russell finished eighth. Hamilton qualified eighteenth, and Russell qualified eighth. Hamilton recovered to finish ninth and Russell finished sixth.

In the Miami sprint weekend, Russell and Hamilton were knocked out on SQ2 and started the sprint race from 11th and 12th, respectively. In the sprint, Hamilton was penalized by the stewards with a 20-second time penalty for speeding in the pit lane during a Safety Car period, dropping him to 16th. Russell finished the sprint in 12th. Hamilton finished the main race in sixth, with Russell finishing eighth.

=== Turnaround in form (mid-season rounds) ===
Mercedes brought upgrades for the Emilia Romagna Grand Prix consisting of a revised floor and brake duct, and a new rear and beam wing. Russell qualified sixth and Hamilton eighth. Hamilton took seventh place at the start, but neither driver made further progress. Russell pitted late for a new set of mediums, effectively swapping positions with Hamilton, with the former finishing behind, but with the fastest lap at hand.

In Monaco, Russell out-qualified Hamilton with the former starting from fifth while the latter in seventh. During the race, neither driver was able to improve on their starting positions. Wolff claimed that a miscommunication came when delivering a message to Hamilton to undercut Verstappen. Hamilton set the fastest lap.

In Canada, Russell qualified on pole position, setting an identical time of 1:12:00 with Verstappen, while Hamilton qualified seventh. The race started in wet conditions and Russell held on to the lead from Verstappen at the early stages, but made mistakes that allowed both Verstappen and Norris to catch up. At the end Hamilton was third and on course for a podium finish, before Russell overtook him. Russell's third place was the team's first podium of the season. Hamilton finished fourth with the fastest lap. Hamilton would later criticise his race as one of the worst of his career for failing to capitalise on the car's competitiveness in Circuit Gilles Villeneuve.

The Spanish Grand Prix saw Hamilton finishing on the podium for the first time in the season behind Norris and Verstappen. The podium extended his consecutive seasons in a row where he finished on the podium to 18 seasons. Russell finished the race in fourth.

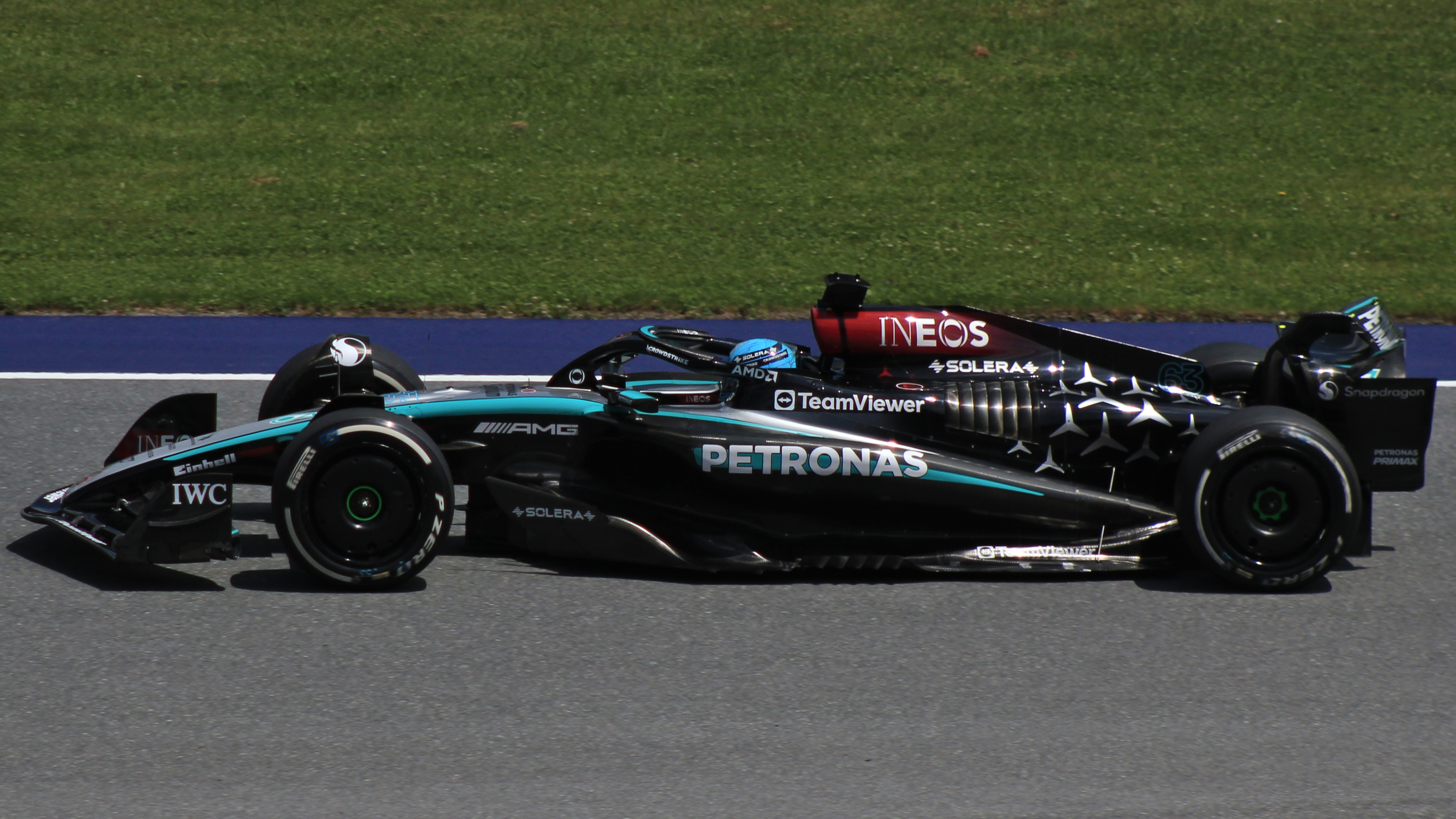
Russell's victory in Austria is the team's first in two years

The W15 achieved its first victory in Austria with Russell taking advantage of Verstappen and Norris' battle for the lead that saw them taking damage. Hamilton missed out on the podium with a fourth-place finish. The victory earned Russell his second career win and the team's first since the 2022 São Paulo Grand Prix.

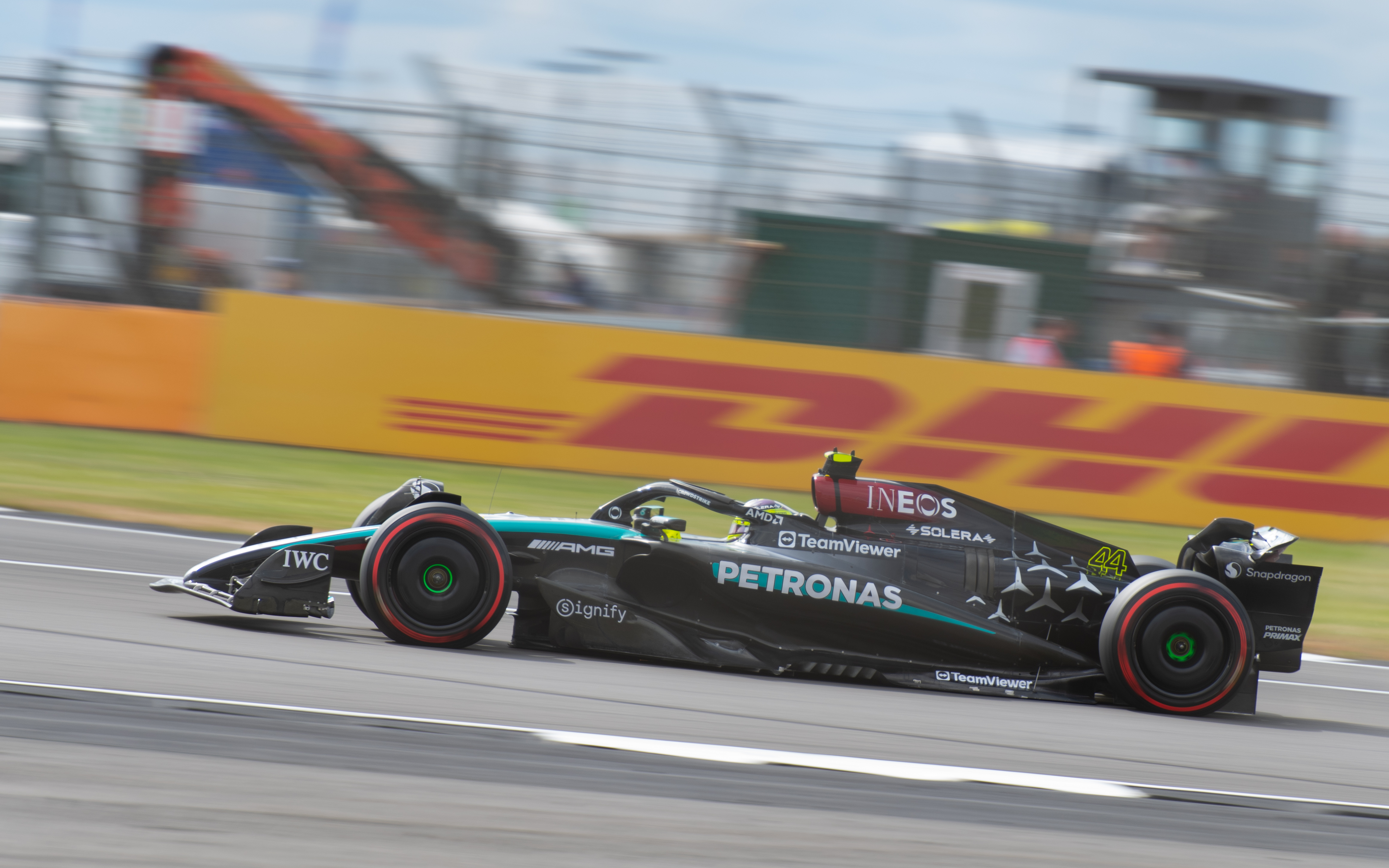
Hamilton took home his first victory in three years in front of the home crowd at the British Grand Prix.

Mercedes locked out the front row in the British Grand Prix, with Russell qualifying on pole and Hamilton in second. However, Russell was forced to retire from the race on lap 35 due to a suspected water issue. Hamilton held off Verstappen and Norris in the changing conditions en route for his first victory since the 2021 Saudi Arabian Grand Prix, ending his winless streak of 56 races in two seasons. In the process, he became the first driver to win the same race (British Grand Prix) nine times. This marked the first time Mercedes won back-to-back races since the 2021 season.

In Hungary, Hamilton claimed his 200th career podium with a third-place finish in a race that saw him making contact with Verstappen at the later stages. Russell had a poor qualifying session that put him 17th after he and Mercedes made an error during qualifying. He eventually recovered to finish the race in eighth.

Belgium was the last race before the season entered summer break. Under rainy conditions, Hamilton qualified third and Russell in seventh following pole-sitter Verstappen's grid penalty. Hamilton started well, overtaking Pérez and Leclerc to take the lead, which he maintained throughout the opening stages of the race. Russell chose a single-stop strategy during the race, as opposed to the two-stop strategy favoured by most drivers, putting him in the lead of the race, but on significantly more worn tyres than Hamilton, who was behind Russell in second. Towards the conclusion of the race, Hamilton rapidly closed the gap between Russell and himself, with Russell having to defend his lead with a gap of less than a second in the last five laps. Hamilton could not make a move on Russell in time however, as the latter took the chequered flag. After the race, the stewards found Russell's car to be 1.5 kg under the minimum 798 kg weight limit, therefore disqualifying him, and Hamilton was promoted as the race winner, earning his 105th career win.

=== Post-summer break rounds ===
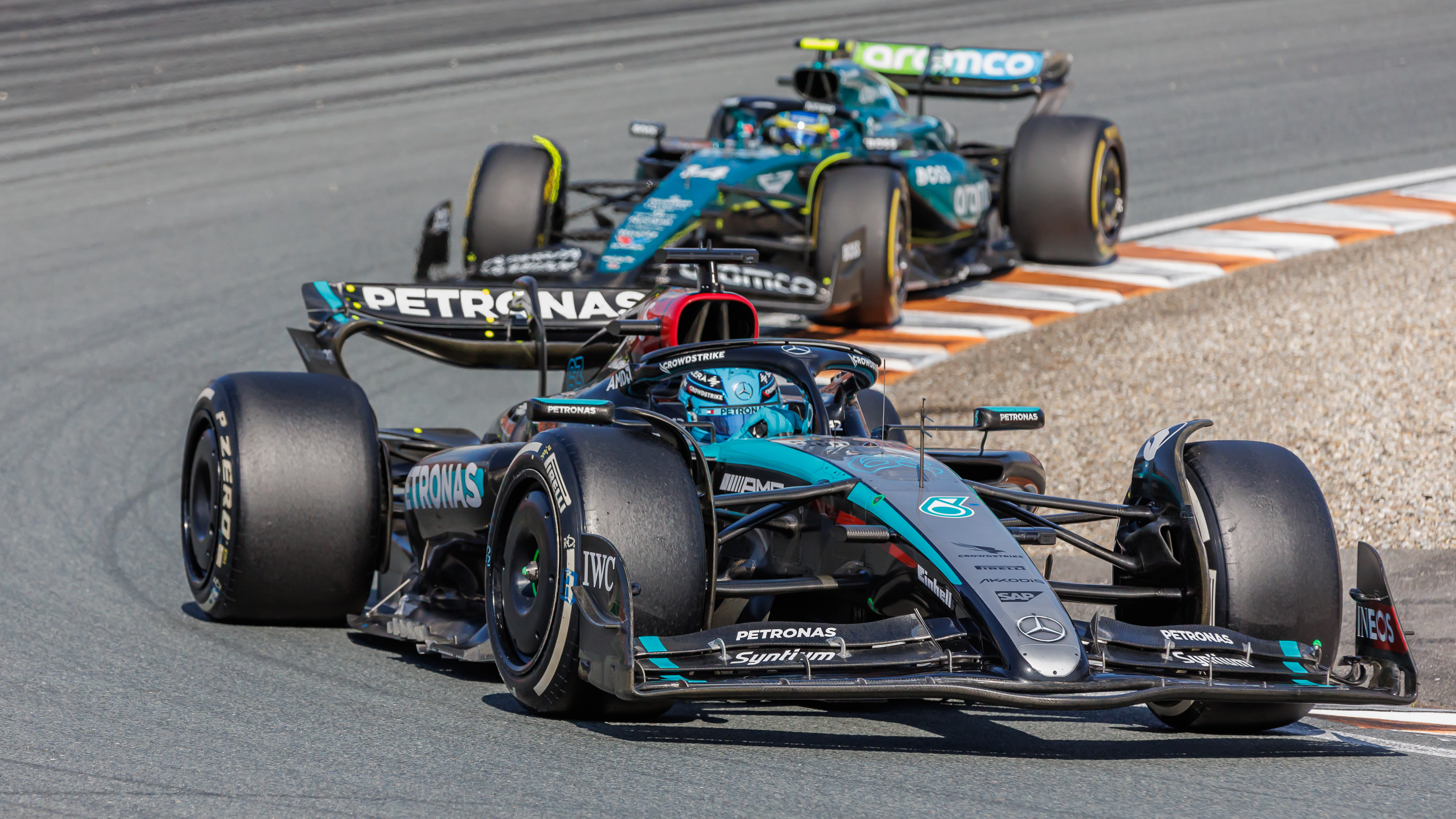
Russell leads Fernando Alonso at the Dutch Grand Prix

For the Dutch Grand Prix, Russell qualified in fourth place, while Hamilton ended up in eleventh after a mistake during his final Q2 run prevented him from advancing to Q3. Furthermore, following the session, Hamilton was given a three-place grid penalty for impeding Sergio Pérez during Q1. Despite starting from fourteenth, Hamilton made a strong comeback to finish eighth in the race. Russell, who was running in fifth, was forced to make a late pit stop to defend against a charging Carlos Sainz Jr. Ultimately, he finished seventh, after being unable to recover the lost positions.

In Italy, Russell qualified third, but due to a mistake and running wide at turn one, he lost positions and damaged his front wing. He could only manage a seventh-place finish in the race. Hamilton finished fifth, having started sixth on the grid. Earlier, Formula 2 driver and Mercedes junior driver Andrea Kimi Antonelli made his Formula One practice debut, during the first free-practice session, driving Russell's car.

In Azerbaijan, Russell qualified fifth, and Hamilton's qualifying struggles continued as he qualified seventh with difficulties in getting his tyres up to temperature. Hamilton started from the pit lane. Russell would eventually finish the race in third, taking advantage of the late crash between Sainz and Pérez. Hamilton recovered from his pit lane start to finish ninth.

Mercedes utilised a special livery for the Singapore Grand Prix to celebrate the 50th anniversary of the team's title sponsor, Petronas. Hamilton qualified third with Russell right behind. Mercedes were the only top running team to implement split strategy for both of its drivers, with Hamilton in softs and Russell with the mediums. Unfortunately, the approach ultimately backfired, as Hamilton was unable to attack Verstappen and Norris ahead. At the end of the race, Hamilton fell into sixth while Russell fended off late charge from Leclerc to finish fourth. The "frustrating" race took its toll on both of the drivers, with Hamilton and Russell experiencing a suspected heat stroke that caused them to skip the media obligations after the race. Following the race, Mercedes confirmed that they will bring their last "substantial" upgrades to Austin and learning how to run under tracks that are prone to overheat the tyres.

=== Closing rounds ===
Mercedes officially introduced a large aero update for the United States Grand Prix with a new front wing, a front suspension package, new bodywork, and a revised floor. The upgrades left the drivers downbeat at the sprint race as Hamilton could only muster sixth and Russell finishing fifth despite starting from second before losing out to Norris at the start. Hamilton blamed the upgrades after he qualified 19th for the main race and retiring early after he spun out into the gravel trap at Turn 3. Russell started from the pit lane after having crashing out of the qualifying session and the team had to run Russell's car using the older-spec before the summer break. The approach ultimately paid off as Russell finished the race in sixth aided by a late overtake on Pérez, despite the stewards penalising him with a 5-second penalty for the manner he overtook the Sauber of Valtteri Bottas.

Mercedes handed Antonelli his second FP1 outing at the Mexico City Grand Prix, this time in place of Hamilton. Despite crashing out in FP2, Russell put the car in fifth and Hamilton qualified right alongside in sixth despite running the Austin-spec. Both drivers had a little battle on the opening stages after Hamilton overtook his teammate before Russell took the place back on lap 14. They made good progress after the pit stop phase, and were further aided by Verstappen's 20-second time penalty. Hamilton finished fourth ahead of Russell after overtaking him on lap 65.

Shortly before the São Paulo Grand Prix, Mercedes announced they would cease development of the W15 due to a lack of available funding following a series of costly accidents since the summer break. Wolff revealed that the only upgrades for the W15 going into Brazil were two floors. Under the rainy skies, Russell briefly led the race after jumping Norris at the start and held a one second gap. Mercedes decided to bring him in during a VSC, but an untimely red flag that followed due to Franco Colapinto's costly crash eliminated Russell's advantage. Due to the strategical error, Russell finished in fourth while Hamilton had an even more difficult race after finishing in tenth.

Mercedes took a surprising 1–2 finish at the Las Vegas Grand Prix, where Russell took his first pole position of the year with Hamilton finishing behind after recovering from tenth. Russell summarised the W15's performance as being weak on bumpy circuits due to requiring a higher ride height, but on circuits like the Las Vegas Strip Circuit, the team could utilise a low downforce setup to maximise performance. In addition, the W15 incurred higher tyre temperatures than its competitors. Commentators suggested that as a result, Mercedes outperformed during night races, like Las Vegas, but struggled during daytime races when the higher ambient temperatures increased the rate of tyre degradation.

In the Qatar Grand Prix, Russell took his fourth career pole after the stewards controversially penalized Verstappen with one-place grid penalty, thus promoting him to pole position. Hamilton was bested by Russell again as he started the race from sixth. Hamilton was penalized after jumping the start and has his race further compromised with a puncture caused by a debris on the track. After serving his five-second time penalty, the stewards awarded Hamilton with a drive-through penalty for speeding in the pit lane that culminated in a frustrating 12th-place finish. Russell also suffered "horrendous understeer" that saw him losing positions and he eventually finished fourth.

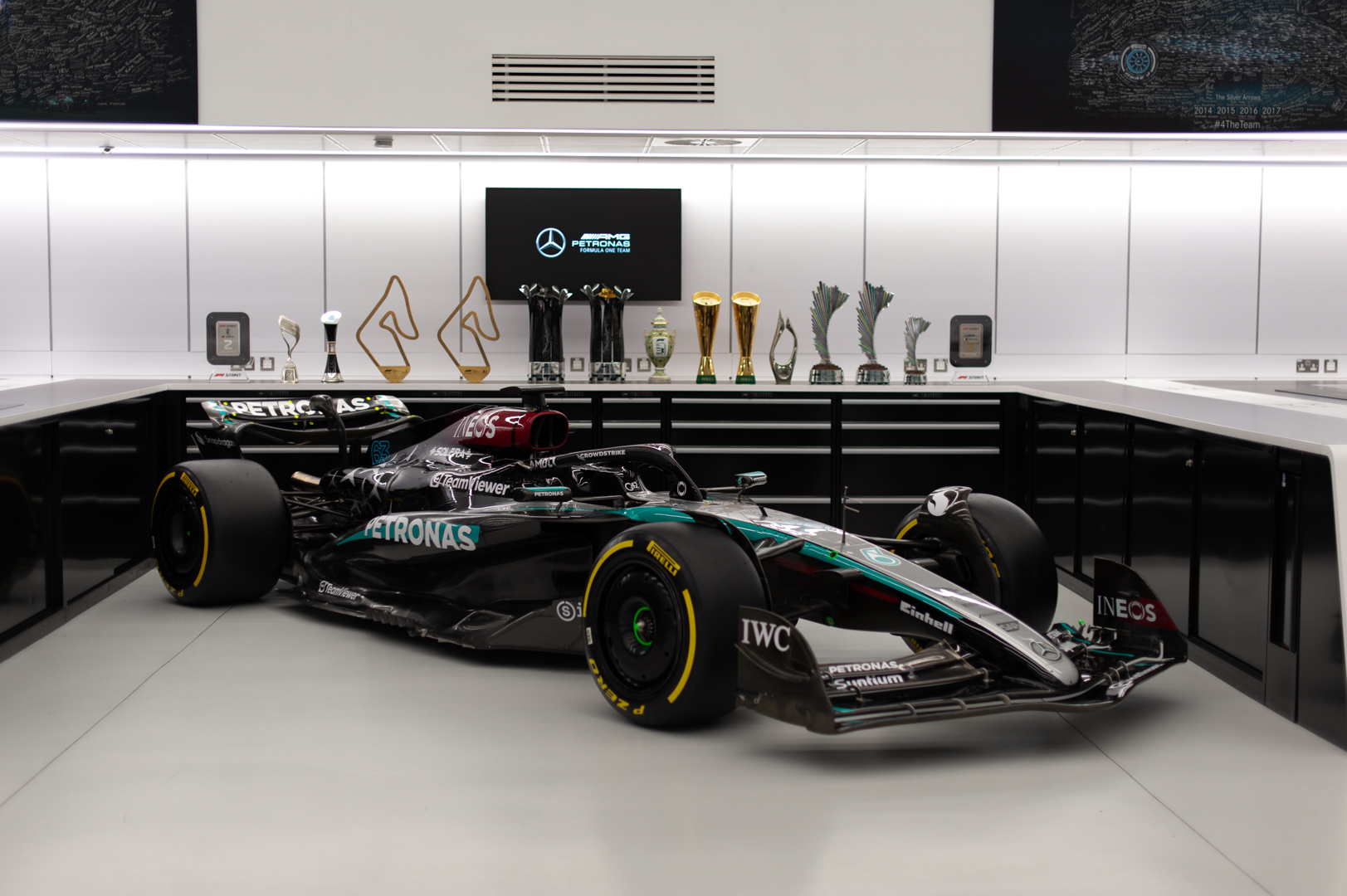
The W15 with the trophies it acquired throughout the season

Hamilton's final qualifying session did not go to plan at the Abu Dhabi Grand Prix after qualifying 16th due to hitting a bollard caused by Magnussen and the team sending Hamilton too late in the session; Wolff labeled the latter as an "idiotic mistake". Russell qualified in sixth between Gasly and Hülkenberg. Russell had a competitive car and made his way to fourth after a contact between Verstappen and Piastri at the opening lap, which he kept near the end of the race. Hamilton gradually climbed places as the race progressed and had the advantage of the grippier medium tyres since he started with the hard compounds. Hamilton soon closed in on Russell and overtook his teammate at Turn 9. Following the race, Russell paid tribute to Hamilton claiming that his overtake was "deserved."

By the end of the season, the W15 collected four wins (with Hamilton and Russell earning two each), nine podium finishes, four poles and four fastest laps, and finished 4th in the constructors' championship with 468 points.

== Complete Formula One results ==
Key

Key
Colour	Result
Gold	Winner
Silver	Second place
Bronze	Third place
Green	Other points position
Blue	Other classified position
Blue	Not classified, finished (NC)
Purple	Not classified, retired (Ret)
Red	Did not qualify (DNQ)
Black	Disqualified (DSQ)
White	Did not start (DNS)
White	Race cancelled (C)
Blank	Did not practice (DNP)
Blank	Excluded (EX)
Blank	Did not arrive (DNA)
Blank	Withdrawn (WD)
Blank	Did not enter (empty cell)
Annotation	Meaning
P	Pole position
F	Fastest lap
Superscript number	Points-scoring position in sprint

Year	Entrant	Power unit	Tyres	Driver name	Grands Prix																								Points	WCC pos.
Year	Entrant	Power unit	Tyres	Driver name	BHR	SAU	AUS	JPN	CHN	MIA	EMI	MON	CAN	ESP	AUT	GBR	HUN	BEL	NED	ITA	AZE	SIN	USA	MXC	SAP	LVG	QAT	ABU	Points	WCC pos.
2024	Mercedes-AMG Petronas F1 Team	Mercedes-AMG F1 M15	P	(United Kingdom) Lewis Hamilton	7	9	Ret	9	9^{2}	6	6	7^{F}	4^{F}	3	4^{6}	1	3	1	8	5	9	6	Ret^{6}	4	10	2	12^{6}	4	468	4th
2024	Mercedes-AMG Petronas F1 Team	Mercedes-AMG F1 M15	P	(United Kingdom) George Russell	5	6	17†	7	6^{8}	8	7^{F}	5	3^{P}	4	1^{4}	Ret^{P}	8^{F}	DSQ	7	7	3	4	6^{5}	5	4^{6}	1^{P}	4^{3 P}	5	468	4th
