= David Nelson (engineer) =

Australian engineer

- Citizenship: Australian
- Education: Monash University
- Occupation: Engineer
- Employer: Mercedes AMG Petronas Motorsport
- Known for: Formula One engineer
- Title: Performance Director

David Nelson is an Australian Formula One engineer. He is currently the Performance Director at the Mercedes AMG Petronas F1 Team.

== Career ==
Nelson studied mechanical engineering and applied mathematics at Monash University, graduating in 1997. He began his engineering career with Holden, initially working as a crash safety and restraint engineer before moving into vehicle dynamics. During this period he specialised in chassis behaviour, modelling and ride performance for road-car programmes.

He moved into Formula One in 2005 when he joined the Brackley-based team then known as British American Racing, which subsequently became Honda Racing F1, Brawn GP and later Mercedes-AMG F1 Team. Nelson worked within the vehicle dynamics department, progressing to Performance Team Leader of the Vehicle Dynamics Group, where he played a role in developing simulation tools, correlation methods and setup direction during the team's championship-winning era.

From 2018 he served as a Senior Vehicle Dynamicist, operating partly from Melbourne while continuing to support the team's factory and trackside activities. In 2024 he was appointed Performance Director, taking responsibility for guiding overall car performance, integrating simulation, vehicle dynamics and data analysis to support the team's contemporary Formula One programmes.
