= Hywel Thomas =

British Formula One engineer

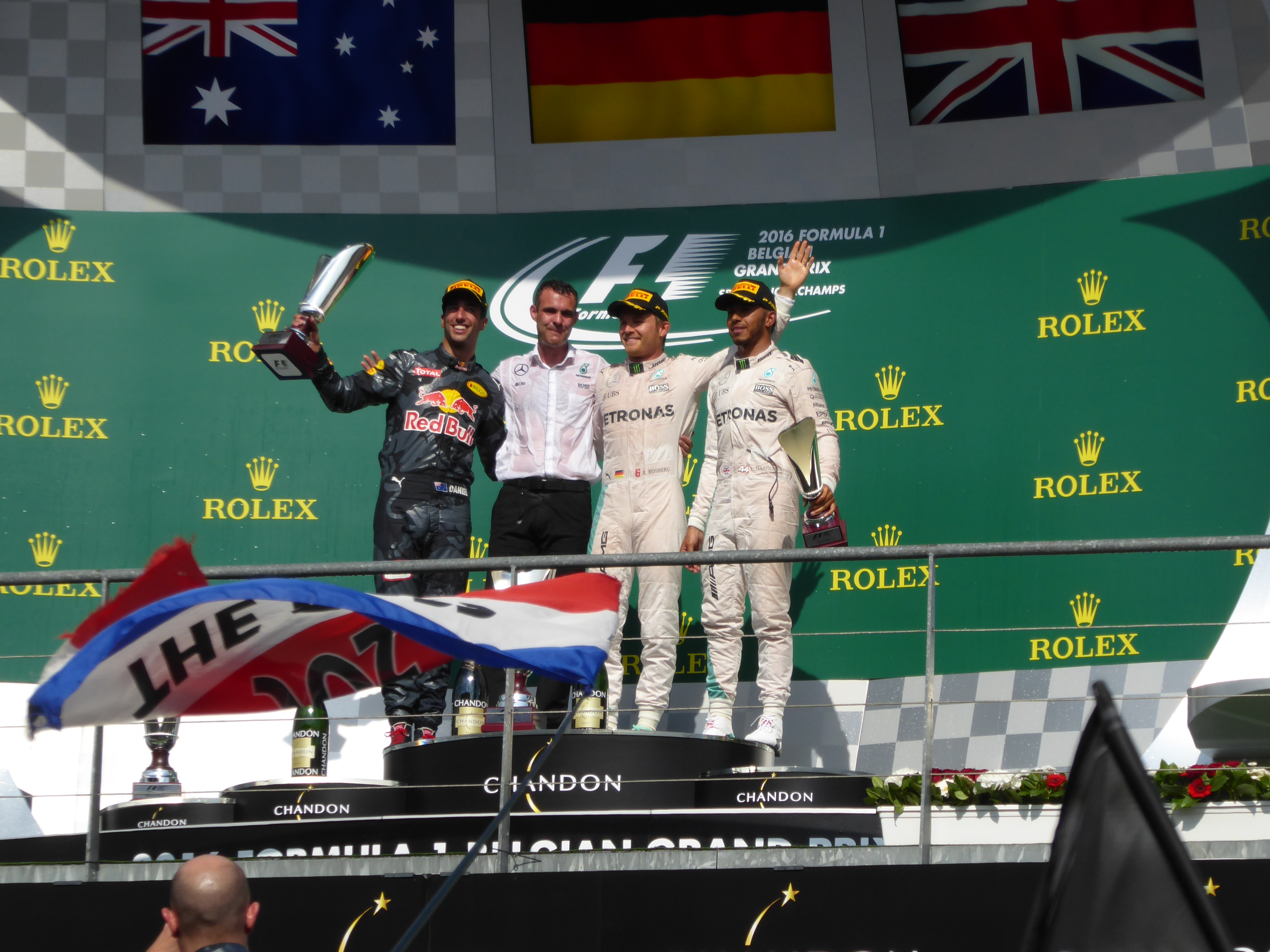
- Hywel Thomas on the 2016 Belgian Grand Prix podium.
- Born: 18 September 1972 (age 53); Torquay, United Kingdom
- Occupation: Engineer
- Employer: Mercedes AMG High Performance Powertrains
- Title: Managing Director

Hywel Thomas (born 18 September 1972) is a British Formula One engineer. He is currently the managing director of Mercedes AMG High Performance Powertrains.

== Career ==
Thomas graduated from the University of Bath in 1995 with a degree in Mechanical Engineering. Shortly afterwards, he joined Perkins Engines as a Graduate Engineer, later progressing into a Simulation Engineer position as he expanded his technical experience.

Thomas moved to Cosworth in 1999, working as a Design Engineer on the company's F1 programme. In 2004, he transitioned to Mercedes-Ilmor, initially as a Senior Design Engineer before also taking on responsibilities as a Design Team Leader. He then became Head of Mechanical Engineering in 2008, and in 2013 stepped into the position of engineering director, playing an integral role in the design of the dominant Mercedes V6 hybrid Formula One power unit.

In 2015 he was appointed Chief Engineer and four years later he assumed oversight of Formula One power unit development as the organisation's F1 Power Unit Director. Throughout this time, the Brixworth power unit team secured seven consecutive Constructors’ Championships with the Mercedes.

He succeeded Andy Cowell as managing director in June 2020, taking responsibility for leading Mercedes engine division (HPP) and steering the continued development of their hybrid power units, including the new generation set to be introduced in 2026.
