= Mercedes V6 hybrid Formula One power unit =

Mercedes V6 turbo-hybrid power unit
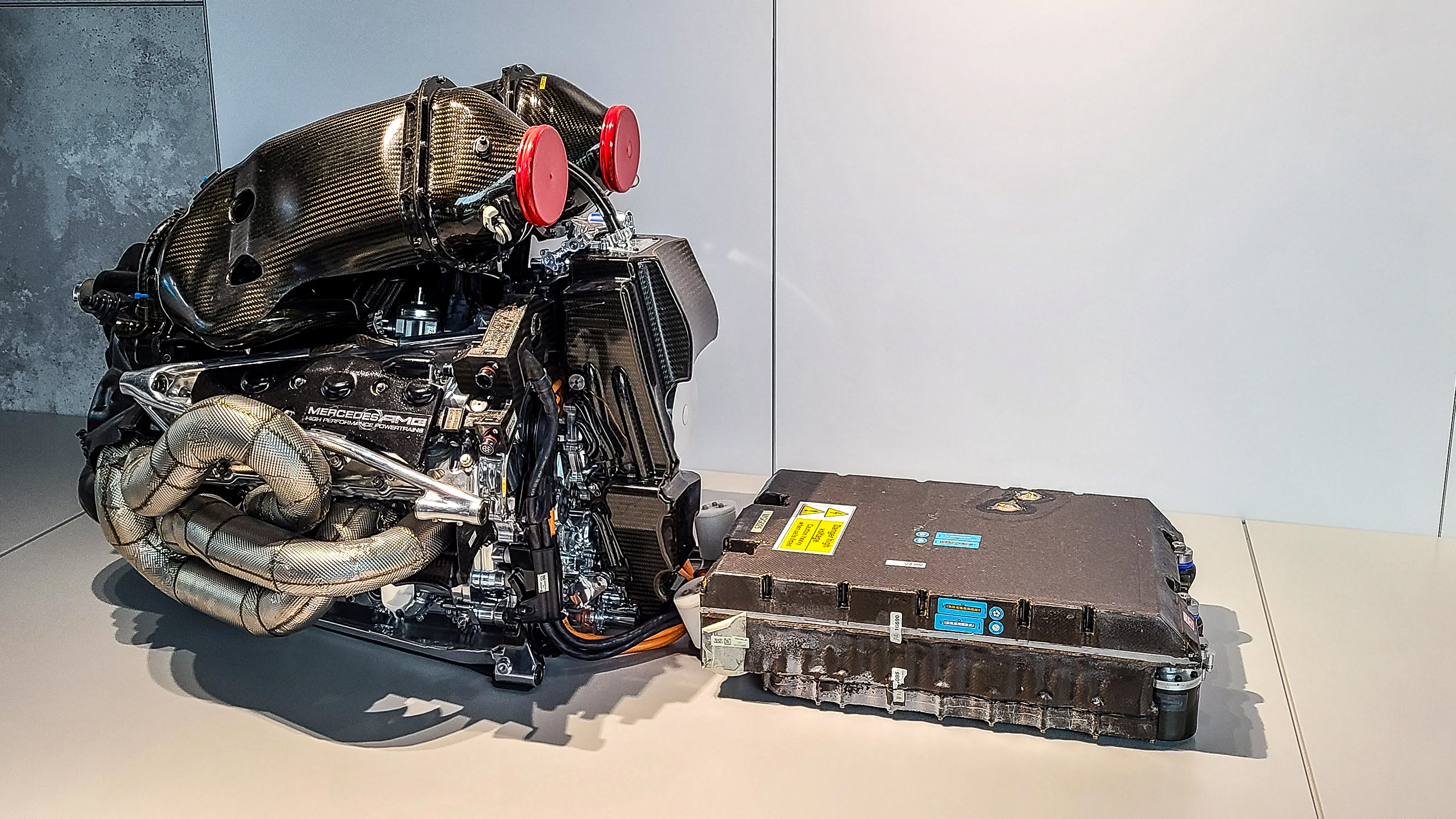
- The Mercedes M10 power unit, used in the 2019 season

Overview
- Manufacturer: Mercedes-AMG High Performance Powertrains
- Production: 2014–present

Layout
- Configuration: V-6 single hybrid turbocharged engine, 90° cylinder angle
- Displacement: 1.6 L (98 cu in)
- Cylinder bore: 80 mm (3.15 in)
- Piston stroke: 53 mm (2.09 in)
- Cylinder block material: Aluminum alloy
- Cylinder head material: Aluminum alloy
- Valvetrain: 24-valve (four-valves per cylinder), DOHC
- Compression ratio: under 18:1

RPM range
- Idle speed: 5,000 rpm
- Max. engine speed: 15,000 rpm (Note: Maximum allowed engine speed as per regulations; actual redline may be lower due to fuel flow limits, such as around 13,500 rpm)

Combustion
- Turbocharger: Hybrid turbocharger with 350–500 kPa (3.5–5.0 bar) boost pressure
- Fuel system: 50 MPa; 7,252 psi (500 bar) gasoline direct injection
- Management: McLaren TAG-320 (2014-2018) later TAG-320B (2019-present)
- Fuel type: Petronas Primax unleaded gasoline 94.25% + 5.75% biofuel, Mobil (McLaren only in 2014), Gulf (Williams from 2023), Aramco (Aston Martin from 2023-25) and Eni (Alpine since 2026)
- Oil system: Dry sump
- Cooling system: Single water pump

Output
- Power output: 626–805 kW (840–1,080 hp)
- Torque output: Approx. 600–822 N⋅m (443–606 ft⋅lb)

Dimensions
- Dry weight: 145–150 kg (320–331 lb) overall including headers, clutch, ECU, spark box or filters

Chronology
- Predecessor: Mercedes-Benz FO engine

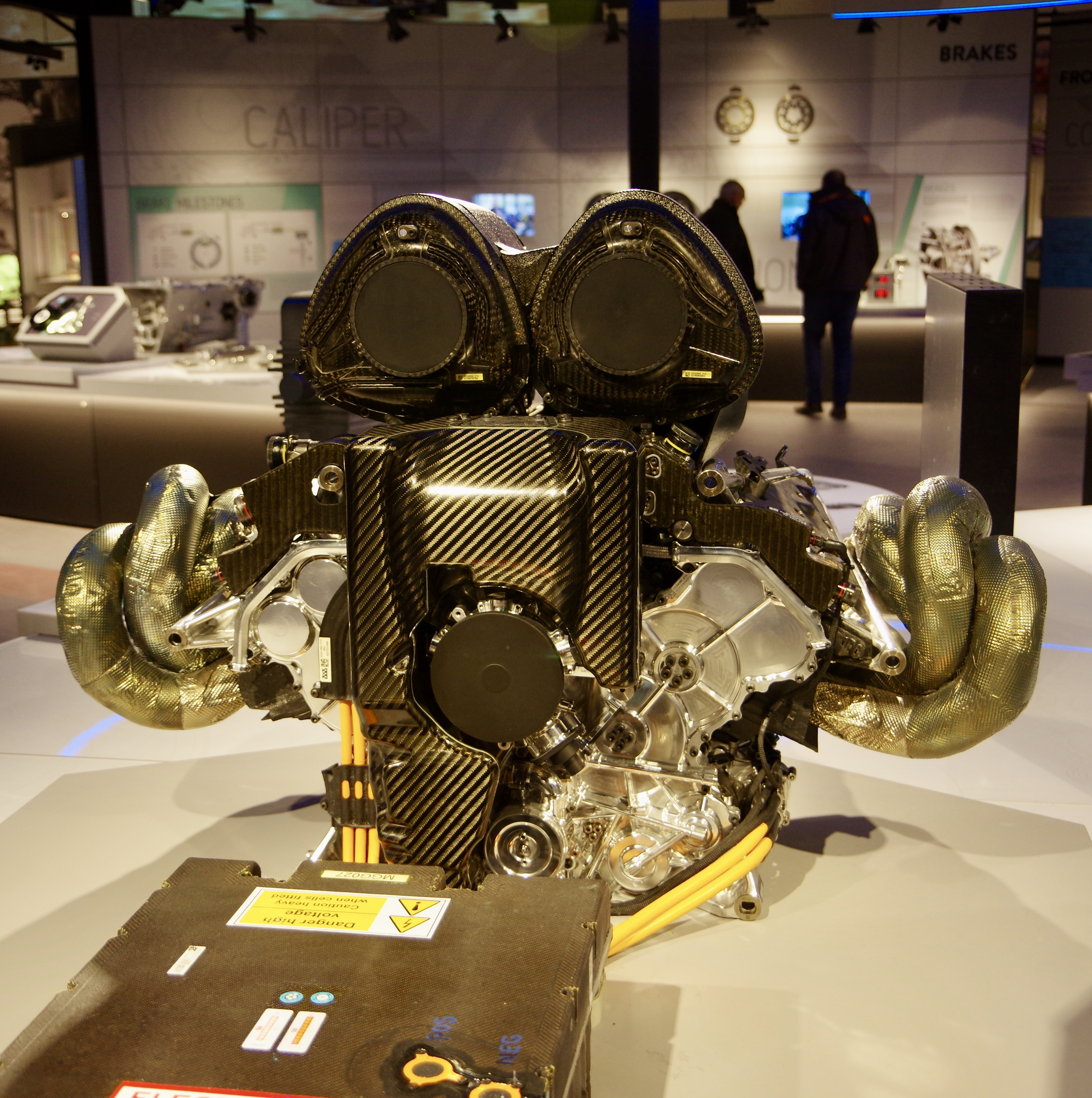
Mercedes PU106 Hybrid Power Unit on display at the Silverstone Experience

The Mercedes V6 hybrid Formula One power unit is a series of 1.6-litre, hybrid turbocharged V6 racing engines which features a kinetic energy recovery system (MGU-K) and featured a waste heat recovery unit (MGU-H) until 2025, developed and produced by Mercedes AMG High Performance Powertrains for use in Formula One. The engines were in use since the 2014 season by the Mercedes works team. Over years of development, engine power was increased from 630 kW (840 hp) at 15,000 rpm, to 810 kW (1,080 hp) at 15,000 rpm. Customer engines are supplied to Williams, McLaren, and Alpine. Historically, Mercedes supplied Force India (and its successors Racing Point Force India, Racing Point, and Aston Martin), Lotus, and Manor. Their most recent championship victories are the 2025 Drivers' and Constructors' championship double with McLaren.

Enduring a successful run since the 2014 season, the Mercedes V6 Hybrid engine has become one of the most successful Formula One engines of all time. It broke the record for most wins in a season in 2016 (this record has since been surpassed by Honda with Red Bull Racing in 2023), as well as among many other major constructor and driver F1 records. Notably, Lewis Hamilton won a record-breaking six drivers' championships and the Mercedes factory team won a record-breaking eight consecutive constructors' championships powered by Mercedes V6 hybrid engines.

== List of Formula One engines ==
Specifications of the Mercedes V6 hybrid F1 power units
Season	Name	Format	Peak power Including hybrid system where applicable	Notes
2014	Mercedes-Benz PU106A	1.600 L 90° V6 with MGU-H hybrid turbo and MGU-K kinetic electric motor	630 kW (840 hp)	
2015	Mercedes-Benz PU106B	1.600 L 90° V6 with MGU-H hybrid turbo and MGU-K kinetic electric motor	649 kW (870 hp)	Adapted for use in the Mercedes-AMG One
2016	Mercedes-Benz PU106C	1.600 L 90° V6 with MGU-H hybrid turbo and MGU-K kinetic electric motor	670 kW (900 hp)	
2017	Mercedes-AMG F1 M08 EQ Power+	1.600 L 90° V6 with MGU-H hybrid turbo and MGU-K kinetic electric motor	708 kW (949 hp)	
2018	Mercedes-AMG F1 M09 EQ Power+	1.600 L 90° V6 with MGU-H hybrid turbo and MGU-K kinetic electric motor	750 kW (1,000 hp)	
2019	Mercedes-AMG F1 M10 EQ Power+	1.600 L 90° V6 with MGU-H hybrid turbo and MGU-K kinetic electric motor	750 kW (1,000 hp)	Badged as "BWT Mercedes" for Racing Point
2020	Mercedes-AMG F1 M11 EQ Performance	1.600 L 90° V6 with MGU-H hybrid turbo and MGU-K kinetic electric motor	764 kW (1,025 hp)	Badged as "BWT Mercedes" for Racing Point
2021	Mercedes-AMG F1 M12 E Performance	1.600 L 90° V6 with MGU-H hybrid turbo and MGU-K kinetic electric motor	780 kW (1,050 hp)	
2022	Mercedes-AMG F1 M13 E Performance	1.600 L 90° V6 with MGU-H hybrid turbo and MGU-K kinetic electric motor	800 kW (1,070 hp)	
2023	Mercedes-AMG F1 M14 E Performance	1.600 L 90° V6 with MGU-H hybrid turbo and MGU-K kinetic electric motor	810 kW (1,080 hp)	
2024	Mercedes-AMG F1 M15 E Performance	1.600 L 90° V6 with MGU-H hybrid turbo and MGU-K kinetic electric motor	810 kW (1,080 hp)	
2025	Mercedes-AMG F1 M16 E Performance	1.600 L 90° V6 with MGU-H hybrid turbo and MGU-K kinetic electric motor	810 kW (1,080 hp)	
2026	Mercedes-AMG F1 M17 E Performance	1.600 L 90° V6 turbo with MGU-K kinetic electric motor	750 kW (1,010 hp)	

== Statistics ==
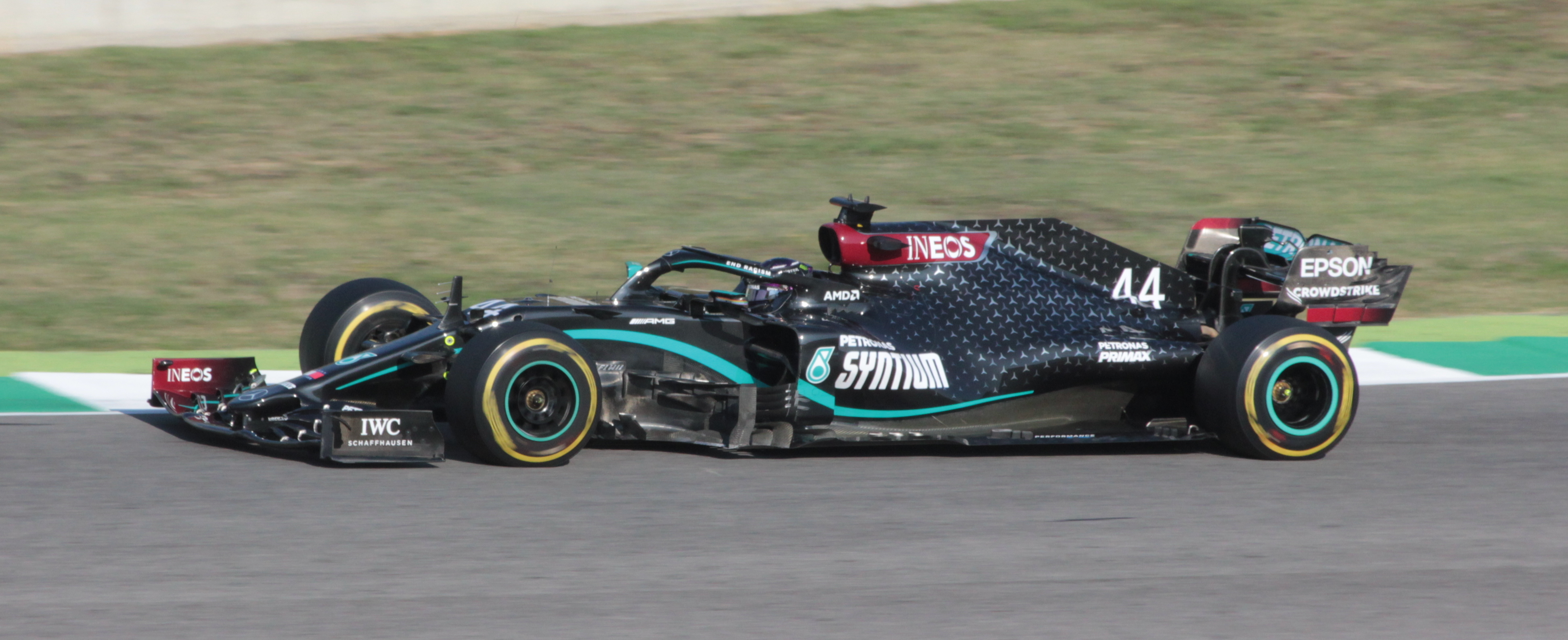
Mercedes-AMG W11 F1 car, powered by a Mercedes V6 Hybrid engine, it was one of the most successful F1 cars of all time

The Formula One regulations in 2014 saw Mercedes produce a unique hybrid 1.6-liter turbocharged V6 engine, that could produce a significant amount of power with less fuel consumption compared to Ferrari and Renault engines. It also featured the kinetic energy recovery system (MGU-K) and heat energy recovery system (MGU-H). The engine was soon proved to have a clear advantage over other engines, as cars powered by the Mercedes engine scored the majority of points during the 2014 season. For 2026, the regulations were changed to remove the MGU-H and increase the power of the MGU-K. Since 2014, Mercedes-powered cars scored pole position in 165 and won 155 of 272 races (as of the 2026 São Paulo Grand Prix), and won 9 drivers' championships and 11 constructors' championships.

Season statistics for Mercedes engines

Season	Constructors	Races	Wins	Pole positions	1–2 finishes	Podiums	Fastest laps	WCC
2014	Mercedes, Force India, McLaren, Williams	19	16	19	15	41	17	1st, 3rd, 5th, 6th
2015	Mercedes, Force India, Lotus, Williams	19	16	18	12	38	13	1st, 3rd, 5th, 6th
2016	Mercedes, Force India, MRT, Williams	21	19	20	8	35	10	1st, 4th, 5th, 11th
2017	Mercedes, Force India, Williams	20	12	15	4	27	10	1st, 4th, 5th
2018	Mercedes, Force India, Williams	21	11	13	4	26	10	1st, 7th, 10th
2019	Mercedes, Racing Point, Williams	21	15	10	9	32	9	1st, 7th, 10th
2020	Mercedes, Racing Point, Williams	17	14	16	6	29	9	1st, 4th, 10th
2021	Mercedes, Aston Martin, McLaren, Williams	22	10	10	1	35	12	1st, 4th, 7th, 8th
2022	Mercedes, Aston Martin, McLaren, Williams	22	1	1	1	18	8	3rd, 5th, 7th, 10th
2023	Mercedes, Aston Martin, McLaren, Williams	22	0	1	0	24	8	2nd, 4th, 5th, 7th
2024	Mercedes, Aston Martin, McLaren, Williams	24	10	12	4	30	12	1st, 4th, 5th, 9th
2025	Mercedes, Aston Martin, McLaren, Williams	24	16	15	9	48	19	1st, 2nd, 5th, 7th
2026*	Mercedes, Alpine, McLaren, Williams	20	15	17	6	32	12	1st, 4th, 6th, 9th

* Season still in progress.

== Other applications ==
=== Mercedes-AMG One ===
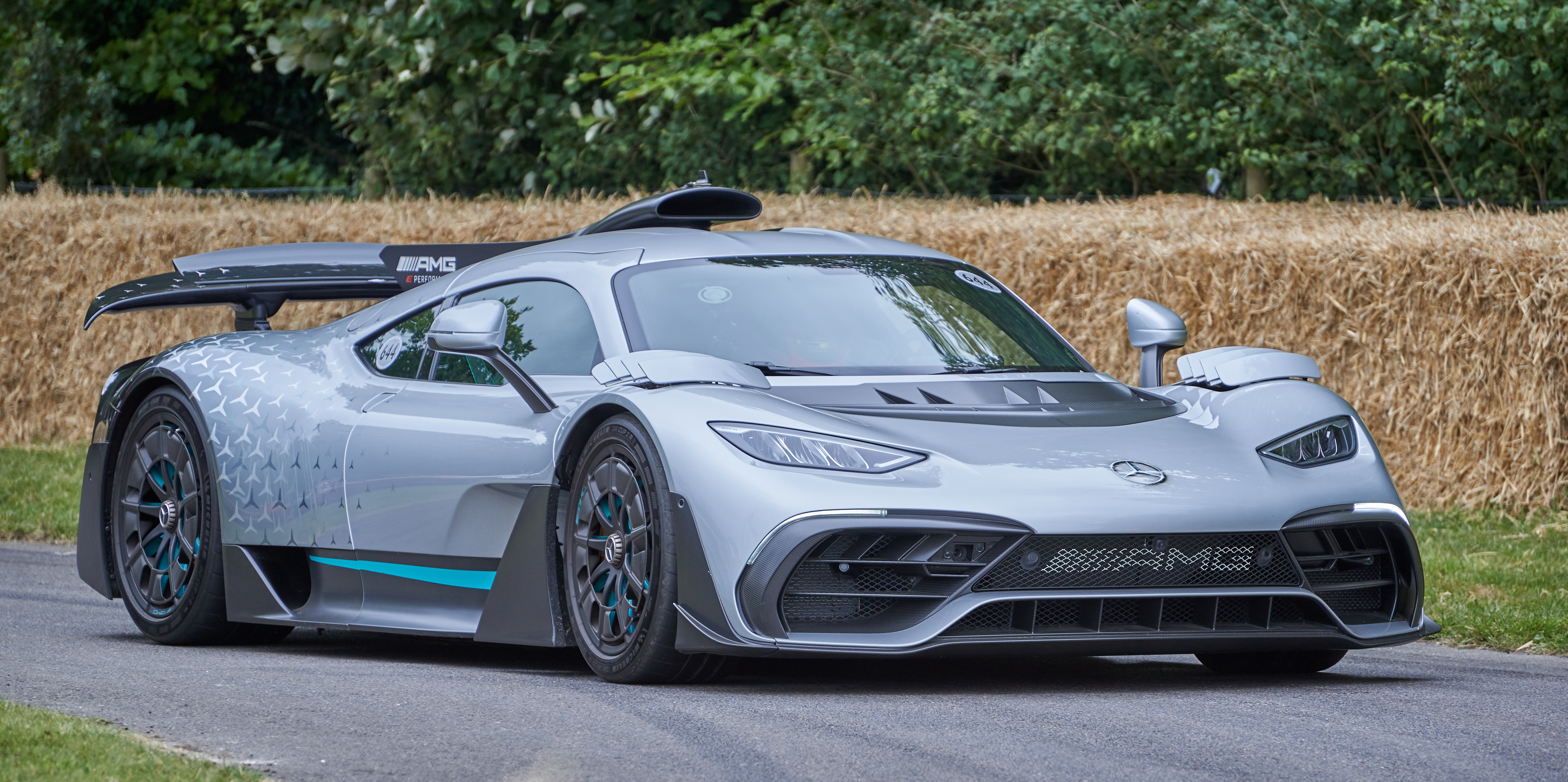
The Mercedes-AMG One at the 2022 Goodwood Festival of Speed

The Mercedes-AMG One production hypercar features a powertrain similar to modern Formula One cars. The production version of the car features a modified version of the 1.6 L (98 cu in) Mercedes-Benz PU106B Hybrid E-turbo V6 engine used in the Mercedes F1 W06 Hybrid Formula One car. The engine was modified to make it road legal, with changes including reduced idle and redline RPM. It produces a maximum power output of 422 kW (574 PS; 566 hp). Torque figures were unmeasurable due to the complex powertrain.

The internal combustion engine works in conjunction with four electric motors; a 120 kW (163 PS; 161 hp) MGU-K coupled to the crankshaft, a 90 kW (122 PS; 121 hp) MGU-H coupled to the turbocharger, and two electric motors in the front axle producing 240 kW (326 PS; 322 hp). The One has a total combined power output of 782 kW (1,063 PS; 1,049 hp). The MGU-K and MGU-H are similar as in use in Formula One cars, which were responsible for recovering energy and improving efficiency during the operation of the car. More specifically, the MGU-K serves to generate electricity during braking, while the MGU-H serves to eliminate turbo lag and improve throttle response by keeping the turbine spinning at lower engine high speeds. Two electric motors drive the front wheels and creates an all-wheel drive drivetrain, the sum of these four electric motors contribute 360 kW (489 PS; 483 hp) of effective power to the total power output figure of the AMG One.

The head of Mercedes-AMG, Tobias Moers, claimed that the engine idles at 1,280 rpm and 11,000 rpm at its redline limit. However, the engine will only last for 50,000 km (31,000 mi) and the owners would have to return their cars for an engine refurbishment costing 850,000 euros. This Formula One inspired powertrain helps the car attain a top speed of 352 km/h (219 mph). According to Mercedes-AMG, the car can accelerate from 0 to 100 km/h (62 mph) in 2.9 seconds, 0 to 200 km/h (120 mph) in 7.0 seconds and 0 to 300 km/h (190 mph) in 15.6 seconds.

== See also ==
- Audi V6 hybrid Formula One power unit
- Ferrari V6 hybrid Formula One power unit
- Honda V6 hybrid Formula One power unit
- Red Bull Ford V6 hybrid Formula One power unit
- Renault V6 hybrid Formula One power unit
