= Freddie Hunt =

British racing driver (born 1987)

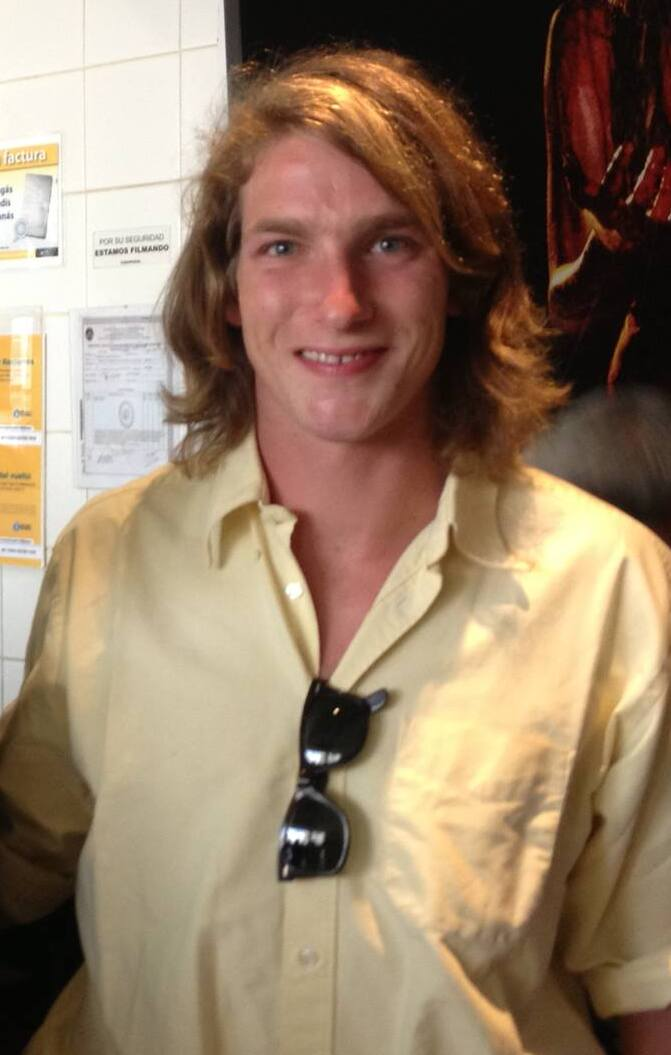
- Freddie Hunt at the Master de Pilotos de la República Argentina in 2013
- Nationality: (United Kingdom) British
- Born: Freddie Alexander Hunt; 28 June 1987 (age 39) Guildford, Surrey
- Relatives: James Hunt (father); David Hunt (uncle); Tom Hunt (brother); Sarah Lomax (mother)

Prototype Cup Germany career
- Current team: Reiter Engineering
- Categorisation: FIA Silver (until 2018, 2023–); FIA Bronze (2019–2022)
- Car number: 76
- Starts: 3
- Wins: 1
- Podiums: 2
- Poles: 0
- Fastest laps: 0
- Best finish: 1st in 2022

Freddie Alexander Hunt (born 28 June 1987) is a British racing driver, presenter, entrepreneur and former professional polo player. He most recently competed in the Prototype Cup Germany for Reiter Engineering from 2023 until the series folded in 2025. He is the son of 1976 Formula One World Champion James Hunt and his second wife, Sarah Lomax.

== Early life ==
Freddie Alexander Hunt was born on 28 June 1987 in Guildford, Surrey, to James Hunt and his second wife, Sarah Lomax. He suffered from severe hearing issues at a young age as a result of enlarged adenoids, and eventually had them removed via operation to allow him to hear properly. His parents divorced when he was two, and he grew up in the countryside with his mother and brother Tom Hunt. His father died when he was 5 years old, at which point he began attending grand prix, though he knew little about cars or motorsport.

Hunt left school at 16 and began participating in professional polo shortly after, sparked by his childhood in the countryside around horses, and began working as a chef in a pub in his spare time to fund his participation. He held a two-goal handicap in the sport, but eventually moved away from polo as it became too expensive to compete in, selling the six ponies he competed with.

== Early career ==
Hunt's interest in motorsport was sparked after he attended the 2006 Goodwood Festival of Speed as a spectator and was subsequently convinced by a friend to drive a Maserati at the event. After the festival, he got into contact with his uncle David Hunt, who was also a racing driver, and the latter assisted in kickstarting his career.

Hunt began racing aged 19, making his single-seater debut in 2007 in British Formula Ford with Joe Tandy Racing. In his first race of the season at Donington Park, he was the cause of a collision that caused five other drivers to retire from the race, after which he was nicknamed "Hunt the Shunt Jr." by Motorsport News. He finished 20th in the championship with 37 points. In the same year, Hunt competed in the Formula Ford Festival with little success. Hunt also drove two of his father's historic cars at the Silverstone Classic, namely the Hesketh 308 and the McLaren M23, which were driven by James Hunt to achieve his first race victory at the 1975 Dutch Grand Prix and his first and only Formula One World Drivers' Championship in 1976 respectively.

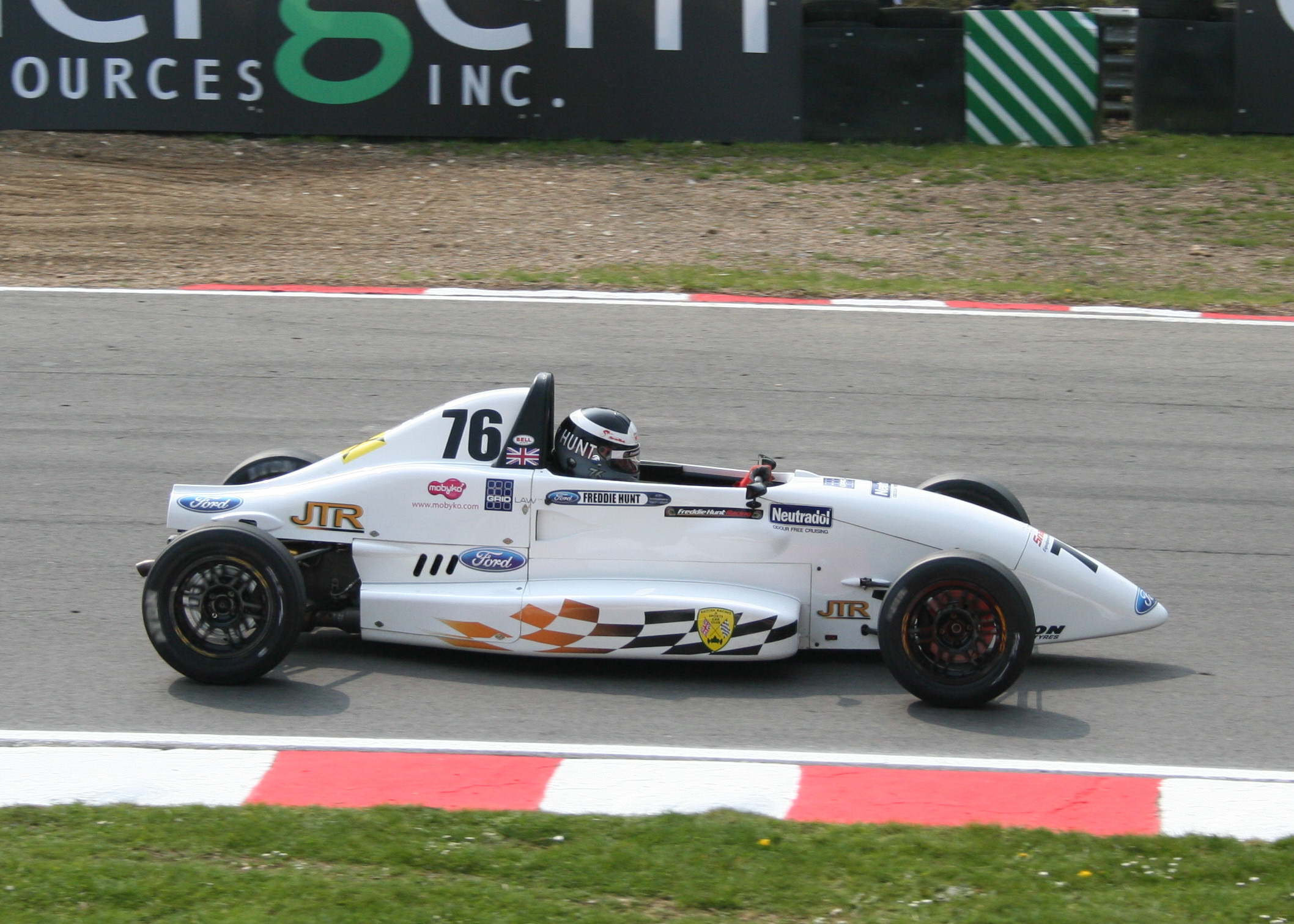
Hunt driving in British Formula Ford in 2007

In 2008, Hunt competed in eight rounds of the inaugural ADAC Formel Masters series for Buchbinder Racing by Emotional Engineering, scoring 0 points. In the same year, he also competed in the Club Ginetta Series for ADAC Motorsport, driving a Ginetta G20. The championship would result in the "most enjoyable race" of his career, in which he got pole position in a wet qualifying session before retiring in the race due to a throttle issue. In 2009, Hunt went back to the ADAC Formel Masters series, scoring five points and finishing 20th in the championship. In that same year, he drove in the ADAC Volkswagen Polo Cup in Germany, scoring no points.

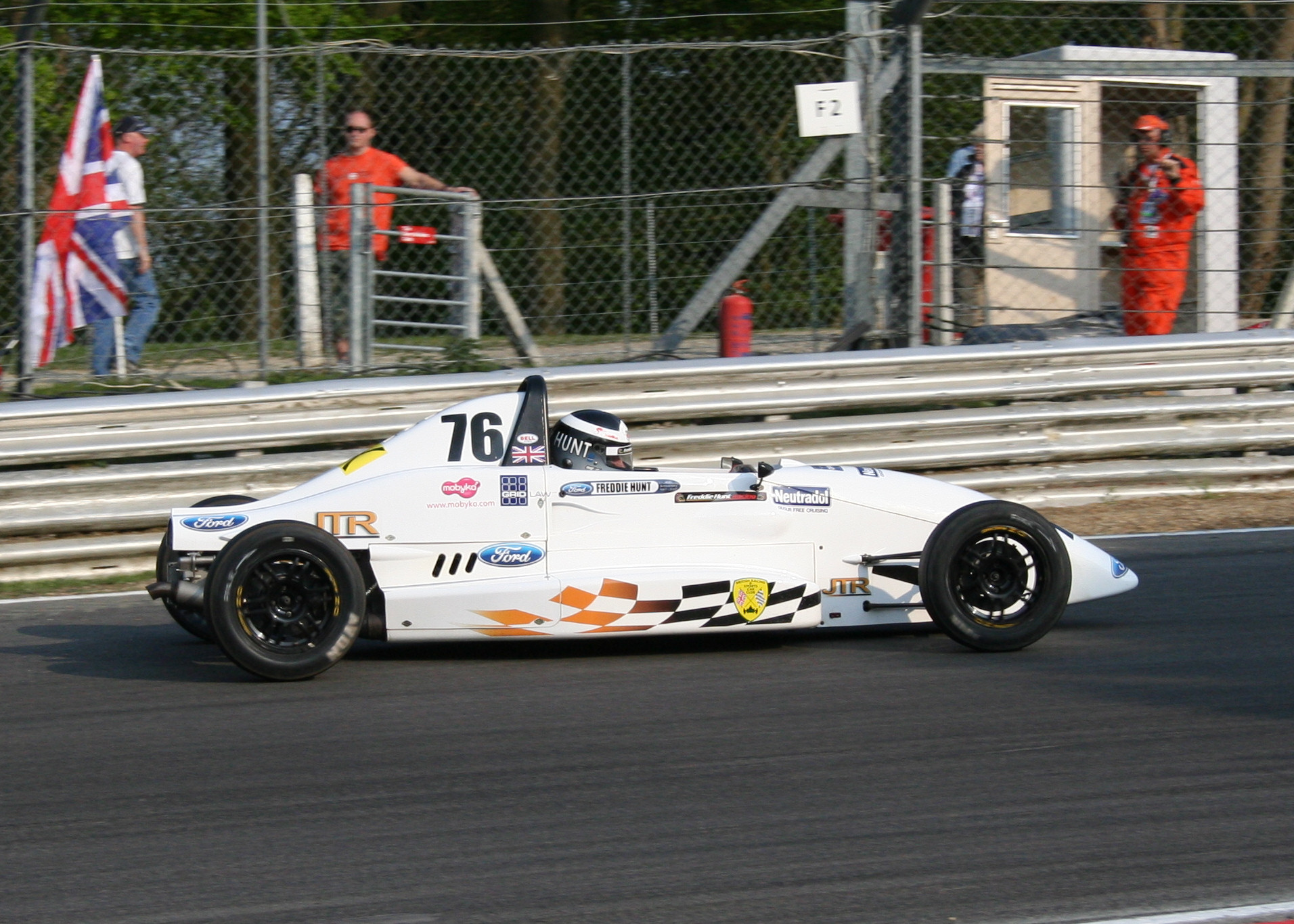
Hunt driving at the Brands Hatch round in the 2007 British Formula Ford Championship

Mounting pressure from his family name and the intense scrutiny centred around his inability to match his father's level of success resulted in Hunt deciding to take a multi-year hiatus from motor racing in 2008. Hunt later stated that he was "swamped by media photographers" and put under high amounts of pressure that impacted his performances while on track throughout his early career. During this hiatus, Hunt made two guest appearances in the ADAC Cruze Cup driving a Chevrolet Cruze for Team ADAC Weser-Ems and later Buchbinder Rent-a-Car by Motorsport Arena Oschersleben in 2012. Hunt also participated in the 2008 Goodwood Festival of Speed, in which he drove his father's 1975 Hesketh 308B for the second time.

== Career ==
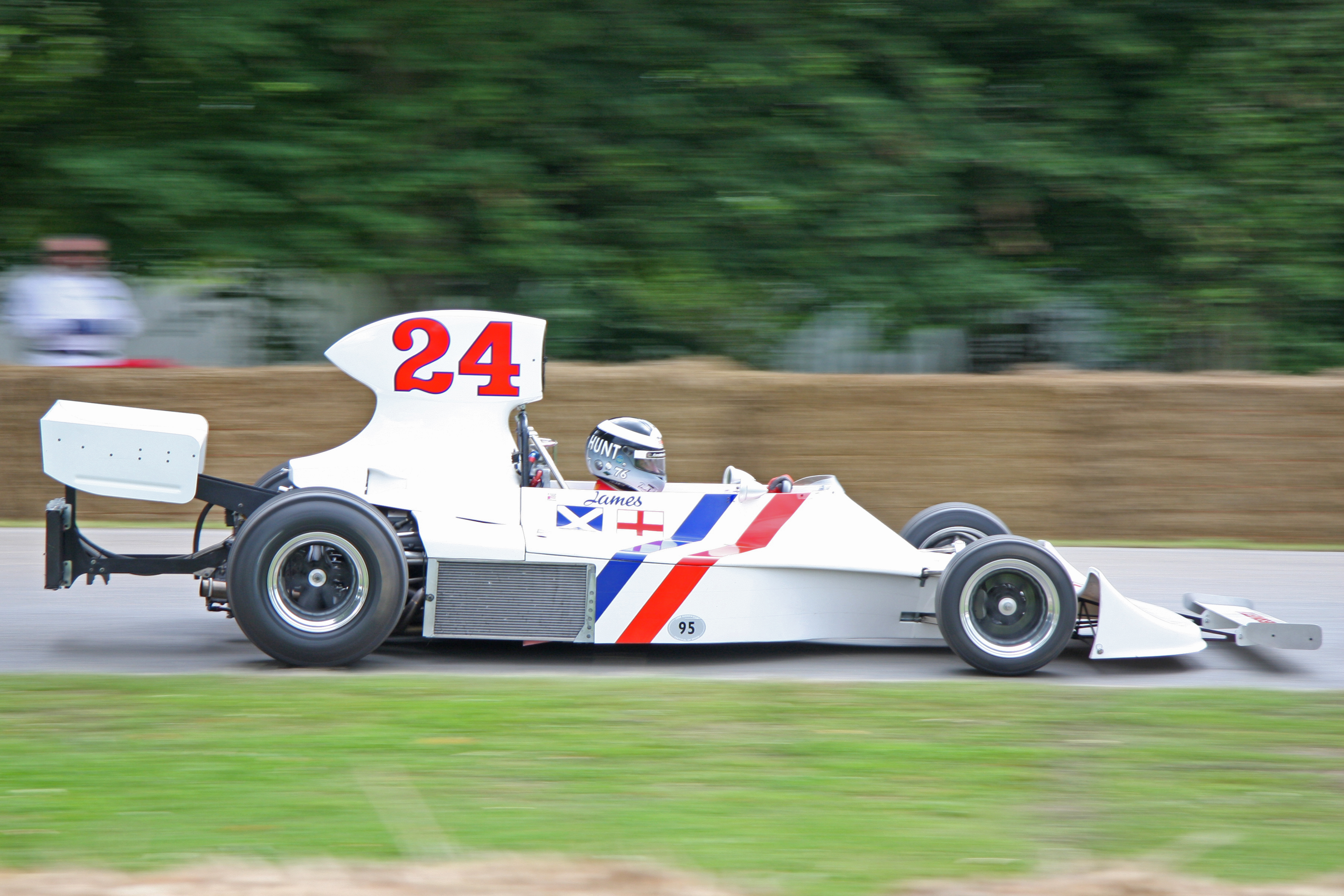
James Hunt's Hesketh 308B being demonstrated by Freddie at the 2008 Goodwood Festival of Speed

In 2013, Hunt made his official return to motorsport after he was invited as an international guest to compete in the Master de Pilotos de la República Argentina, a karting event that coincided with the Argentine premiere of the film Rush, which depicts the famous 1976 rivalry between his father and Niki Lauda. The race featured professional drivers from Argentina's major racing categories including Súper TC2000 and Turismo Carretera, and took place on a specially designed street circuit in Puerto Madero. In a tribute to his father, Freddie competed using the number 11, the same number James Hunt carried during his 1976 Formula 1 World Championship-winning season. He finished 12th.

In 2014, Hunt competed in the Walter Hayes Trophy, driving a Swift SC92 in the Formula Ford 1600 category. He finished 17th. Hunt subsequently entered into the 2014–15 MRF Challenge Formula 2000 Championship, in which his teammate was Mathias Lauda, son of Niki Lauda for the first two rounds. Hunt finished the season 21st with five points.

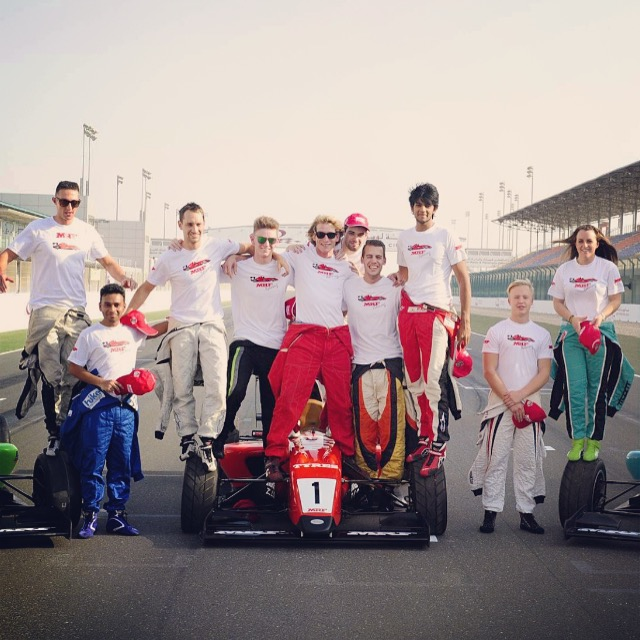
Hunt (middle) at the 2014–15 MRF Challenge Losail round, with Mathias Lauda and Nikita Mazepin among others.

In the same year, Hunt also competed in the Renault UK Clio Cup for Bubble & Kick Racing, where he would finish 31st with 19 points. In 2015, Hunt would also step into endurance racing for the first time, competing in the Dunlop 24 Hour Race at Silverstone - Class 1 with Simon Green Motorsport, driving a Jaguar XKR-S. Hunt and his teammates Nigel Rata and Simon Green were only able to complete 38 laps before the car was retired. Additionally, Hunt would make a one-off appearance in the Aussie Racing Cars Super Series for Darwin Hyundai, driving a Hyundai Elantra. Overall, he finished 55th in the championship with 29 points. Also in 2015, Hunt would make a guest appearance in the Maserati Trofeo World Series, achieving pole position in the first race he entered and finishing 25th in the championship. Alongside his racing, Hunt demonstrated his father's Hesketh 308B at the 2015 Goodwood Festival of Speed. Hunt also competed in the Pirelli World Challenge season finale at Laguna Seca in which he would become involved in a large incident at the start of the race. As the field accelerated for the standing start the fourth-place qualifier, Mark Wilkins, stalled on the grid. Coming from further back in the pack Hunt was unsighted and drilled into the back of the stalled Kia at approximately 60 mph (97 km/h). Hunt was ruled out of the event immediately and suffered a back injury that sidelined him from racing for several months.

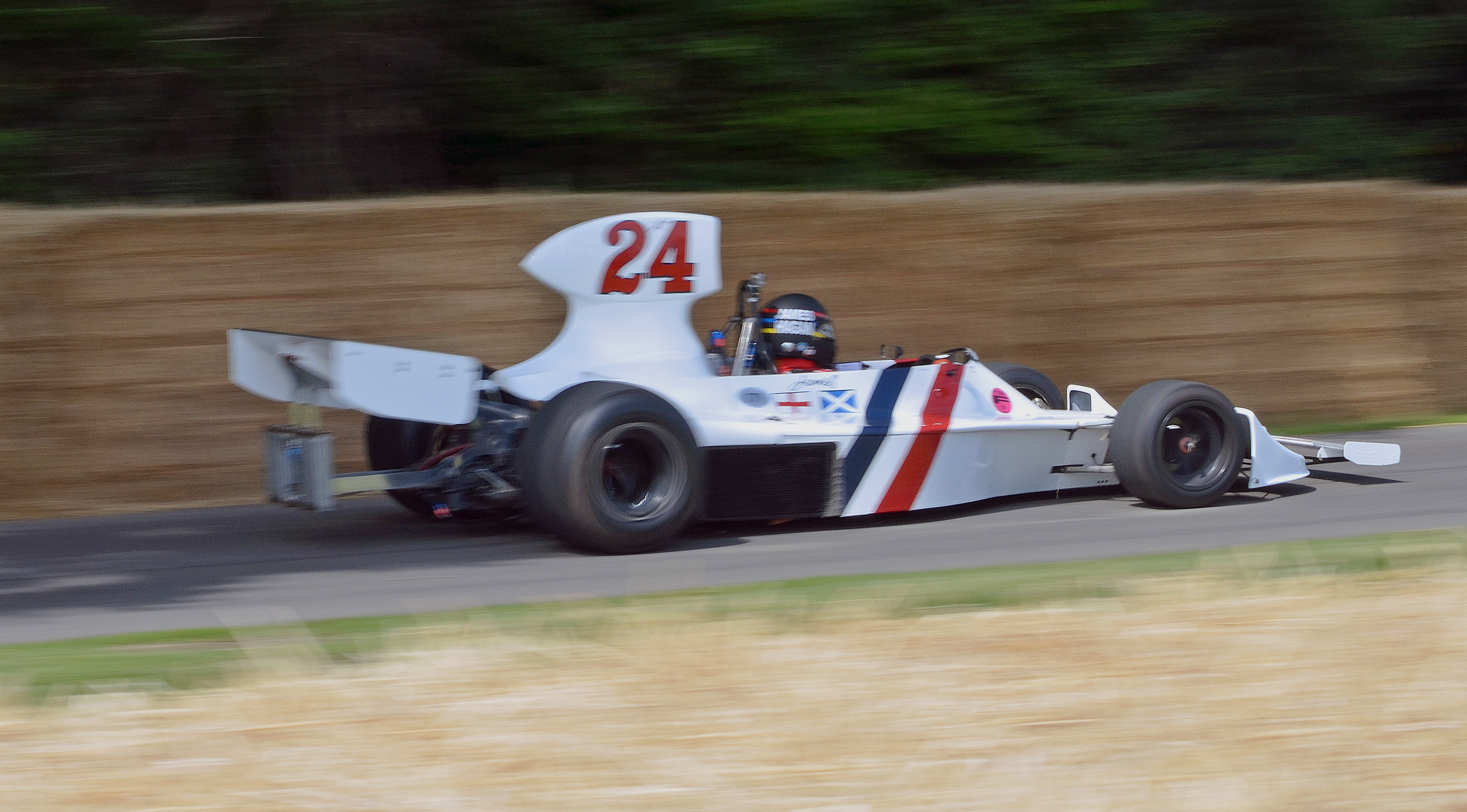
Hunt demonstrating his father's Hesketh 308B at the 2015 Goodwood Festival of Speed.

After his recovery in 2016, Hunt was signed by DF1 Racing to compete in the NASCAR Whelen Euro Series in the Elite 2 class alongside Mathias Lauda. Hunt had a standout debut weekend at Valencia, Spain. In the second race, he charged from 21st on the grid to finish eighth overall, which earned him his first rookie podium as the second-best rookie in the Elite 2 class for that race. Overall, he would finish 25th with 176 points. In the same year, he competed in the Elite 1 class in the same series with less success, finishing 29th with 118 points. In 2017, Hunt signed with Brookspeed International Motorsport to race in the GT4 Northern Europe Cup in the Silver class, driving a Porsche Cayman CS MR GT4 alongside Steven Liquorish. He finished 21st in the standings with four points. A second attempt in the same year resulted in a further 14 points, with Hunt finishing 27th in the standings. In the same year, Hunt would achieve a class victory in the 24H Series - SP3-GT4, his first endurance race win.

The next year in 2018, Hunt competed in the V de V Endurance Series in the LMP3 class, driving for Nefis by Speed Factory. In the Estoril 6 Hours, Hunt would finish second in his class and sixth overall, but as this was his only appearance in the season he would finish 41st with 34 points in the championship. In 2019, he drove in the Michelin Le Mans Cup, in the LMP3 class. He drove a Ligier JS P3 for RLR MSport, finishing 24th overall. Hunt drove in the GT4 South European Series in the same year before returning to the Le Mans Cup for Mühlner Motorsport in 2021, finishing 32nd in the championship with two points. In 2021, he also drove in the Sports Prototype Cup Revolution Trophy, where he finished third with two podiums and a win.

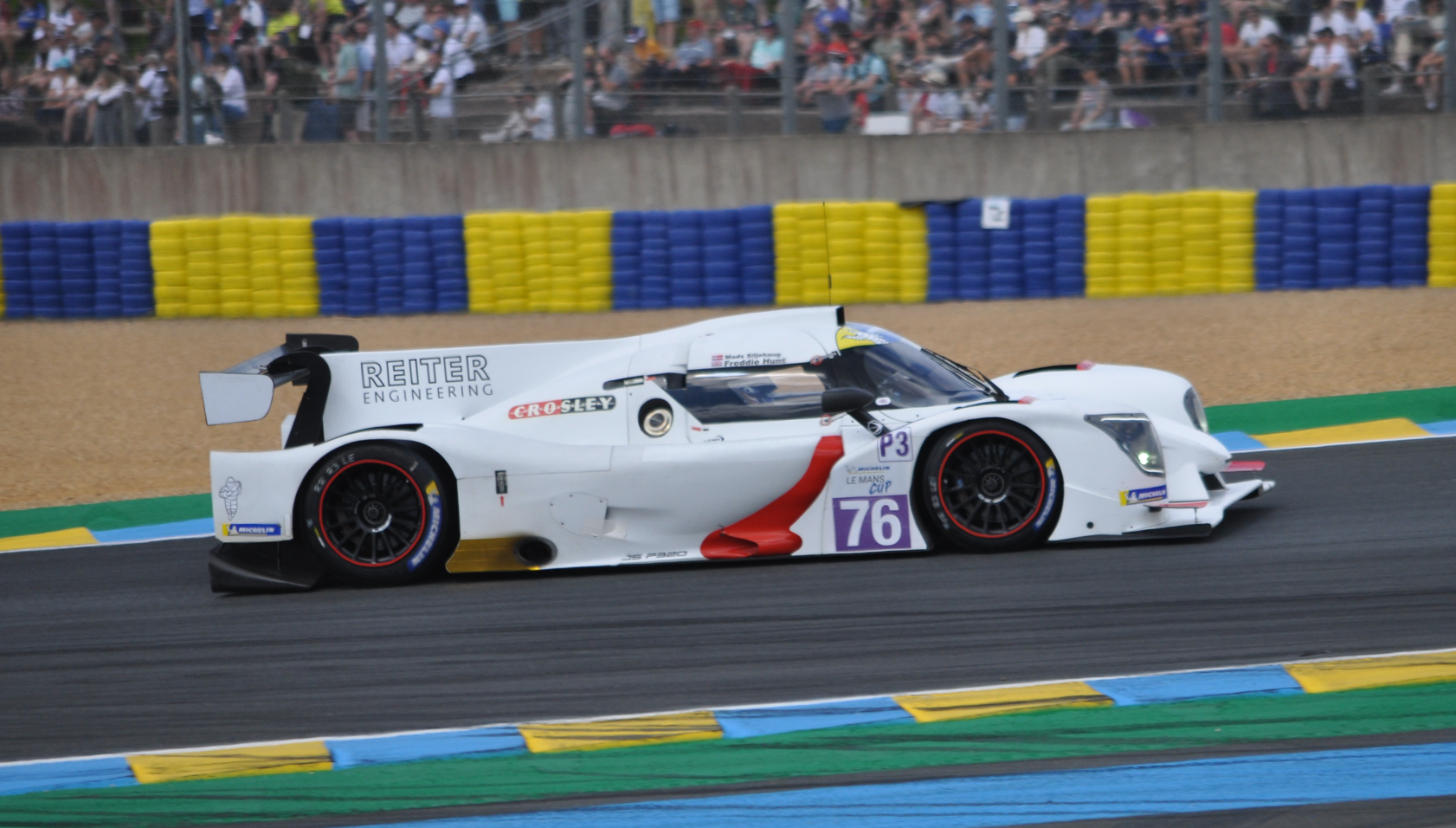
Hunt driving the Ligier JS P320 for Reiter Engineering in the 2022 Le Mans Cup.

In 2022, Hunt signed a five year contract to compete in the Le Mans Cup for Reiter Engineering, driving the Ligier JS P320. Hunt finished second in the LMP3 class, with two pole positions, three podiums and a win at Portimão in seven races. This resulted in Reiter Engineering finishing as runner up in the constructor standings. Hunt also competed in the Nissan Sentra Cup in Canada, in which he ended the season with 47 points in 20th before entering the European Le Mans Series in the LMP3 class for EuroInternational, in which he made his debut at Barcelona. He finished 20th in the standings with ten points and secured his second victory in an LMP3 car during the Prototype Cup Germany round at the Nürburgring. That same year, Hunt raced in, and entered a team into, a charity karting race dubbed the Support Ukraine Grand Prix. The event was a three hour Le Mans style karting race hosted at Rye House Kart Circuit. The event raised £19,500 for Ukrainian refugees.

For 2023, Hunt signed with Reiter Engineering to compete in the Prototype Cup Germany. Hunt made his debut in the series at Zandvoort (24–25 June 2023). This event was particularly sentimental as it was the site of his father James Hunt's first Grand Prix victory in 1975. Hunt continued to race in the Prototype Cup Germany until it folded in 2025 as the organizers could not reach an agreement with ACO about the continuation of the V8-powered cars.

Hunt aimed to enter into and win the 2026 24 Hours of Le Mans to mark the 50th anniversary of his father's F1 World Championship. The project went by the slogan "The Hunt for Le Mans". Ultimately, Hunt did not compete, as his Silver FIA racing licence resulted in the funding required to join a team to be five times more expensive than if he had a Bronze licence.

== Other ventures ==
In 2014, Hunt became an official spokesperson and driver ambassador for the Formula E racing series. For the role, Hunt attended the 2014 Beijing E-Prix and test-drove the year's Spark-Renault SRT_01E in promotional events. In 2016, Hunt became the brand ambassador of Texaco Havoline Europe to coincide with the 40th anniversary of his father's Formula One championship.

In 2021, Hunt co-founded fashion brand Elkay Hunt with fellow racing driver Lee Keshav. The brand sells luxury clothing that is hand-made in India by craftsmen, and intends to promote environmental sustainability.

Hunt co-presents Amazon Prime Video series Car & Country alongside Deepak Narendran and Ashique Thahir, which he began on after joining the programme in the seventh episode of the series, which details the Scottish Highlands. The series was renamed to Car & Country - Rush to commemorate Hunt joining the presenting team.

Ahead of the 2026 Unites States Grand Prix, Hunt appeared on Formula One podcast Beyond The Grid to speak about his father before the 50th anniversary of the 1976 Japanese Grand Prix, where James Hunt had sealed the 1976 World Championship.

== Personal life ==
Hunt's mother, Sarah Lomax, died in 2014 aged 57 due to breast cancer. He is engaged to fellow British racing driver Aimee Watts, whom he met in October 2021. Hunt currently resides in the Isle of Bute, Scotland.

== Racing Record ==
=== Racing career summary ===
Season	Series	Team	Races	Wins	Poles	F/Laps	Podiums	Points	Position
2007	British Formula Ford Championship	Joe Tandy Racing	23	0	0	0	0	37	20th
2008	ADAC Formel Masters	Buchbinder by Emotional Engineering	2	0	0	0	0	0	NC
2008	Club Ginetta Series		2	1	1	1	1	?	?
2009	ADAC Formel Masters	Emotional Engineering	7	0	0	0	0	5	20th
2009	ADAC Volkswagen Polo Cup	ADAC e.V. Motorsport	1	0	0	0	0	?	?
2011	ADAC Cruze Cup	Team ADAC Weser-Ems	1	0	0	0	0	?	?
2012	ADAC Cruze Cup	Buchbinder Rent-a-Car by Motorsport Arena Oschersleben	7	0	?	?	3	?	?
2013	Master de Pilotos de la República Argentina		?	?	?	?	?	0	12th
2014	Walter Hayes Trophy		1	0	0	0	0	N/A	19th
2014–15	MRF Challenge Formula 2000 Championship	MRF Racing	12	0	0	0	0	5	22nd
2015	Renault UK Clio Cup	Team BKR	4	0	0	0	0	19	29th
2015	Trofeo Maserati	Maserati	2	0	1	0	0	0	25th
2015	Pirelli World Challenge - GTS	Maserati	1	0	0	0	0	0	NC†
2015	Aussie Racing Cars Super Series	Darwin Hyundai	4	0	0	0	0	29	55th
2016	NASCAR Whelen Euro Series - Elite 1	DF1 Racing	2	0	0	0	0	118	29th
2016	NASCAR Whelen Euro Series - Elite 2	DF1 Racing	6	0	0	0	0	176	25th
2017	GT4 European Series Northern Cup - Silver	Brookspeed International Motorsport	2	0	0	0	0	14	27th
2017	GT4 European Series Northern Cup - Pro-Am	Brookspeed International Motorsport	2	0	0	0	0	4	21st
2017	24H Series - SP3-GT4	Brookspeed International Motorsport	1	1	0	0	1	0	NC†
2018	V de V Endurance Series - LMP3	Nefis by Speed Factory	1	0	0	0	0	34	41st
2019	GT4 South European Series - Am	Team Virage	2	2	1	2	2	?	?
2019	Le Mans Cup - LMP3	RLR MSport	2	0	0	0	0	0	NC†
2021	Le Mans Cup - LMP3	Mühlner Motorsport	1	0	0	0	0	2	32nd
2022	Le Mans Cup - LMP3	Reiter Engineering	7	1	1	1	3	73	**2nd**
2022	Prototype Cup Germany	Reiter Engineering	2	1	0	0	2	41	11th
2022	European Le Mans Series - LMP3	EuroInternational	1	0	0	0	0	10	18th
2022	Nissan Sentra Cup Canada	JD Production / Groupe Gabriel	2	0	0	0	0	47	20th
2022	Support Ukraine Grand Prix	Sons of Speed	1	?	?	?	?	N/A	?
2023	Prototype Cup Germany	Reiter Engineering	2	0	0	0	0	0	NC†

† As Hunt was a guest driver, he was ineligible to score points.

=== Complete ADAC Formel Masters results ===
(key) (Races in bold indicate pole position) (Races in italics indicate fastest lap)

Year	Team	1	2	3	4	5	6	7	8	9	10	11	12	13	14	15	16	Pos	Points
2008	Buchbinder by emotional engineering	OSC1; 1	OSC1; 2	NÜR1; 1	NÜR1; 2	ASS; 1	ASS; 2	NÜR2; 1	NÜR2; 2	LAU; 1	LAU; 2	SAC; 1	SAC; 2	OSC2; 1	OSC2; 2	HOC; 1; 15	HOC; 2; 12	NC	0
2009	Emotional Engineering	OSC1; 1; 12	OSC1; 2; 16	ASS; 1; 16	ASS; 2; 13	NÜR1; 1; 9	NÜR1; 2; 8	HOC; 1 Ret	HOC; 2 DNS	LAU; 1 DNS	LAU; 2 DNS	NÜR2; 1	NÜR2; 2	SAC; 1	SAC; 2	OSC2; 1	OSC2; 2	20th	5

=== Complete MRF Challenge Formula 2000 results ===
(key) (Races in bold indicate pole position) (Races in italics indicate fastest lap)

Year	1	2	3	4	5	6	7	8	9	10	11	12	DC	Points
2014–15	LOS; 1; 10	LOS; 2; 12	LOS; 3; 10	LOS; 4 Ret	BHR; 1; 9	BHR; 2; 10	BHR; 3 Ret	BHR; 4 Ret	MMR; 1 Ret	MMR; 2 Ret	MMR; 3; 12	MMR; 4 Ret	22nd	5

=== NASCAR ===
(key) (Bold – Pole position awarded by qualifying time. Italics – Pole position earned by points standings or practice time. * – Most laps led.)

==== Whelen Euro Series - Elite 1 ====
NASCAR Whelen Euro Series - Elite 1 results
Year	Team	No.	Make	1	2	3	4	5	6	7	8	9	10	11	12	NWES	Pts
2016	DF1 Racing	66	Chevrolet	VAL	VAL	VEN	VEN	BRH	BRH	TOU	TOU	ADR; 15	ADR; 14	ZOL	ZOL	29th	118

==== Whelen Euro Series – Elite 2 ====
(key) (Bold – Pole position awarded by qualifying time. Italics – Pole position earned by points standings or practice time. * – Most laps led.)

NASCAR Whelen Euro Series – Elite 2 results
Year	Team	No.	Make	1	2	3	4	5	6	7	8	9	10	11	12	NWES	Points
2016	DF1 Racing	66	Chevrolet	VAL; 23	VAL; 8	VEN; 6	VEN; 15	BRH; 19	BRH; 17	TOU	TOU	ADR	ADR	ZOL	ZOL	25th	176

=== Complete Le Mans Cup results ===
(key) (Races in bold indicate pole position; results in italics indicate fastest lap)

Year	Entrant	Class	Chassis	Engine	1	2	3	4	5	6	7	Rank	Points
2019	RLR MSport	LMP3	Ligier JS P3	Duqueine M30 - D08	LEC	MNZ	LMS; 1; 8	LMS; 2; 8	CAT	SPA	ALG	NC†	0†
2021	Mühlner Motorsport	LMP3	Duqueine M30 - D08	Nissan VK56DE 5.6L V8	BAR	LEC	MNZ; 9	LMS	LMS	SPA	POR	32nd	2
2022	Reiter Engineering	LMP3	Ligier JS P320	Nissan VK56DE 5.6L V8	LEC; 11	IMO; 16	LMS; 5	LMS; 2	**MNZ**; 6	**SPA**; 2	ALG; 1	2nd	73
