= Gerry Judah =

British artist and designer

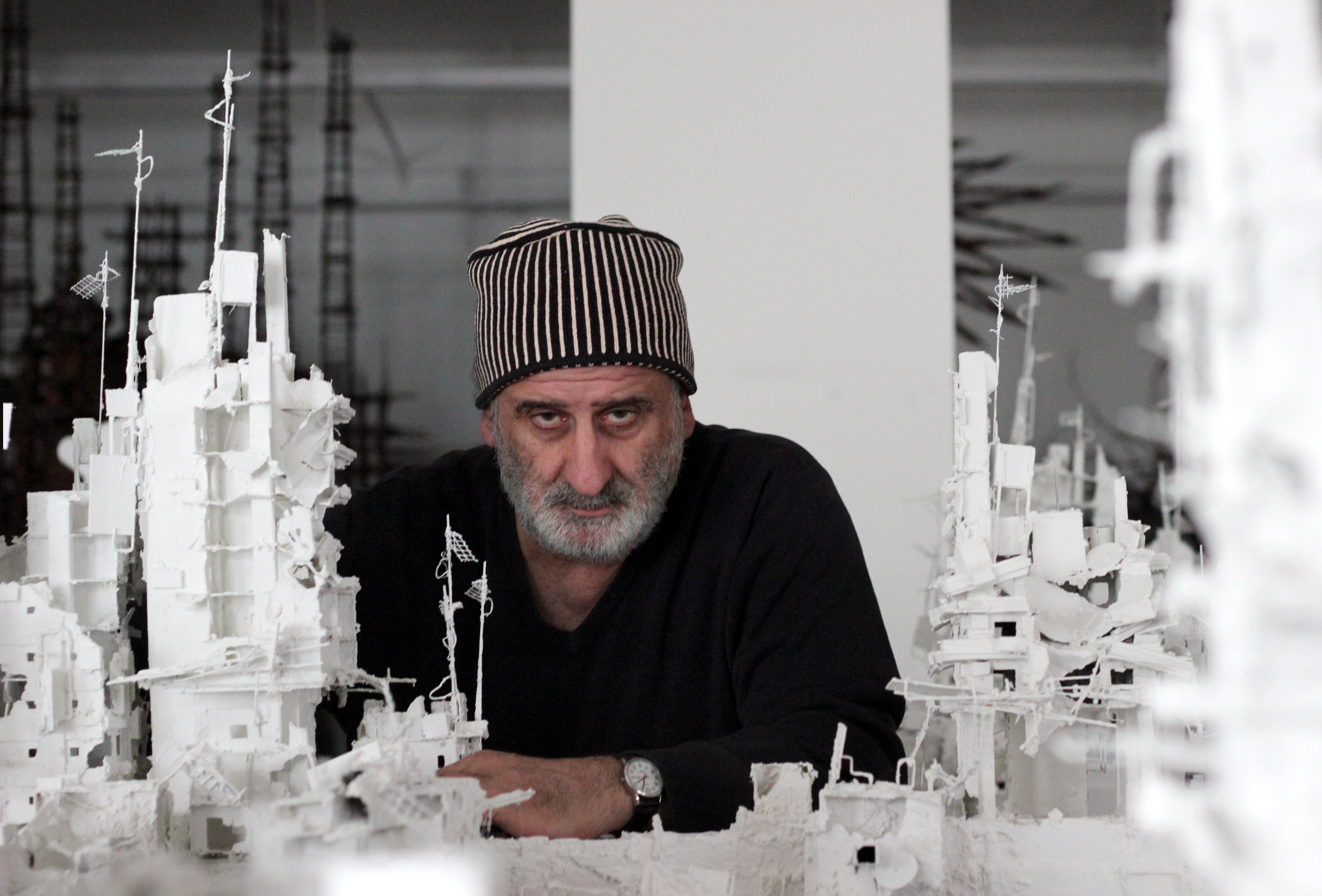
- Judah in his London studio, 2014
- Born: Gerald David Judah; 30 July 1951 (age 74); Calcutta, India
- Education: Goldsmiths College; Slade School of Fine Art
- Known for: Sculpture Painting Art Design
- Website: Gerry Judah

Gerald David Judah FRSS is a British artist and designer who has created settings for theatre, film, television, museums and public spaces.

== Early life ==
Gerry Judah's maternal and paternal grandparents came from Baghdad to settle in the already established Baghdadi Jewish community in India and Burma. His mother was born in Calcutta and his father in Rangoon. Gerry Judah was born in Calcutta and grew up in West Bengal before his family, along with his brother and sister, moved to London when he was ten years old.

As a boy, the dramatic landscapes of India and the ornate architecture of its temples, mosques and synagogues with their theatrical rituals had a profound effect on Judah's developing psyche. These theatrical elements were to resurface in his own later work. Austere London, still in its post-war drab, was a shock to the young boy, and he chose to spend as much time as possible in his bedroom conjuring up with pencils and paper imaginary landscapes, architectural fantasies and futuristic cars. In short, he became an artist. He left Whitefield Secondary Modern School, London in 1969 and worked in a number of jobs from kitchen porter (Blooms Restaurant, Golders Green, London) to architectural draughtsman (T.P Bennett and Son, London, Richard Seifert and Partners, London and Douglas Scott, the designer of the Routemaster bus) after which he went on to study Foundation Art and Design at Barnet College (1970–1972) before obtaining a Double First-Class Honours degree in Fine Art at Goldsmiths College, University of London (1972–1975) and studying sculpture as a postgraduate at the Slade School of Fine Art, University College London (1975–1977).

== Works ==
After college, Judah set up his studio in Shaftesbury Avenue, the theatre centre in the West End of London. There, he began to work on large sculptures. Needing still to earn his keep and finance his work, he took casual work round the corner in many theatres as a stage hand, prop maker and scenic artist. This included work at the Royal Opera House, English National Opera, Royal Festival Ballet, London Contemporary Dance, Sadlers Wells Royal Ballet, Royal Shakespeare Company and the Royal National Theatre.

Judah was taken with the public nature of this work and decided to find settings for his own art in more public arenas than the rarefied spaces of conventional galleries. He began to build a reputation for innovative design, working in film, television, theatre, and in museums as a set designer, installation artist, sculptor and painter. He created settings for the BBC, British Museum, Natural History Museum, Imperial War Museum, Paul McCartney, Michael Jackson, Led Zeppelin, Robert Plant and Jimmy Page, The Who, David Bailey, Terence Donovan, Sting, Godley and Creme and Ridley Scott Associates. He has also created sculptures for Ferrari, Porsche, Audi, Jaguar, Mercedes-Benz, Renault, Ford, Rolls-Royce, Honda, Toyota, Land Rover, Alfa Romeo and Lotus at the annual Goodwood Festival of Speed and has designed bridges in London and Cambridge. Judah also designed a sculpture for Human Rights which was to be sited in Potters Fields, on the South Bank next to Tower Bridge in London and another in Sheffield across the road from the railway station. The London sculpture was recommended for planning permission but was refused by the London Docklands Development Corporation and went to Public Enquiry. It was the first sculpture to be considered for public enquiry and was supported by the Corporation of London, London Borough of Southwark, English Heritage and the Royal Fine Arts Commission along with lawyers from Amnesty International, but was refused planning permission by the Planning Inspector on the grounds that it might incite demonstrations against human rights abuses.

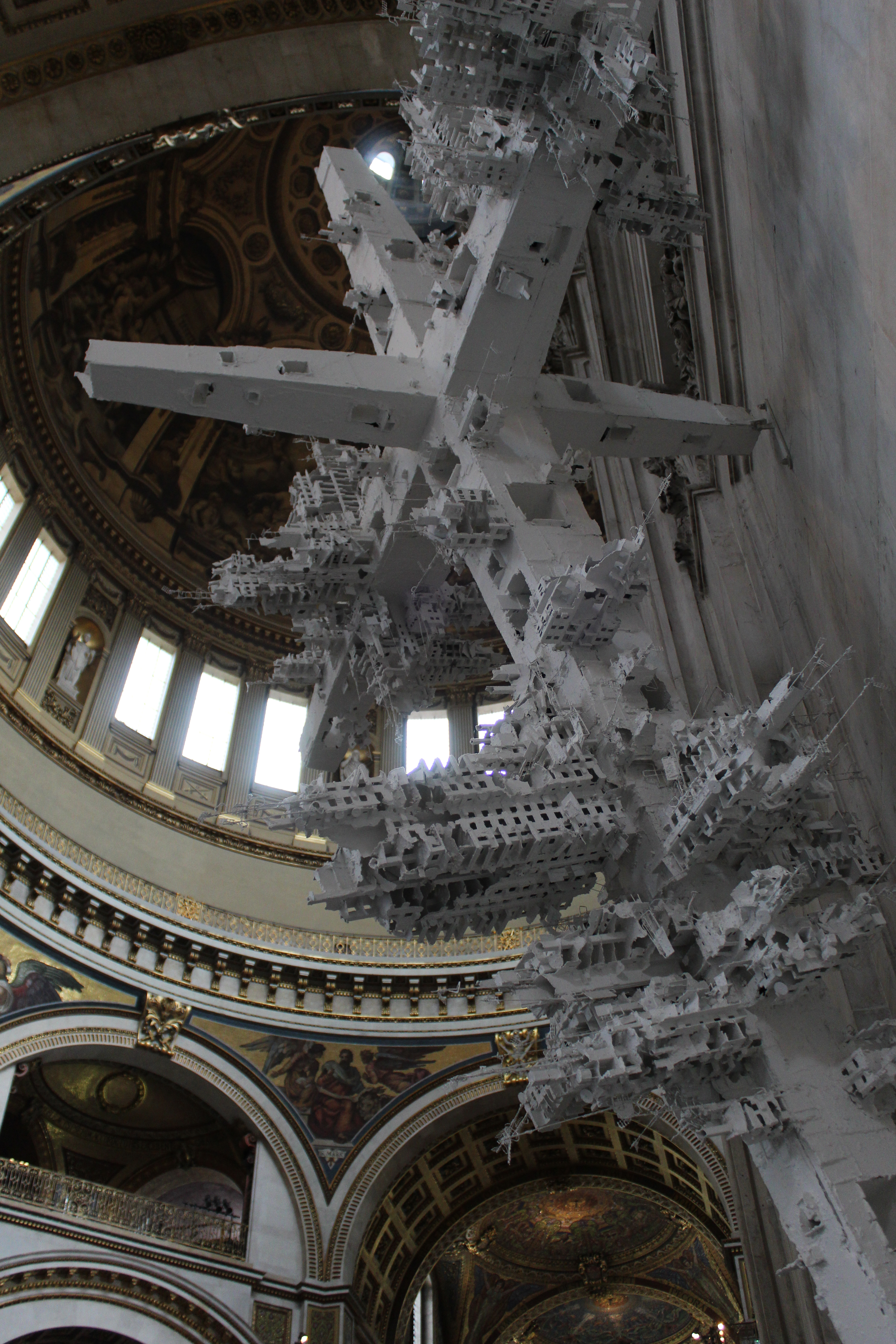
World War I memorial, St Paul's Cathedral, London

Amongst a number of commissions from public museums and institutions, Judah was asked by the Imperial War Museum in London to create a large model of the selection ramp in Auschwitz Birkenau for the Holocaust Exhibition opened by the Queen. Extensive research and numerous visits to Auschwitz led Judah to produce a highly acclaimed work that encouraged him to take his art in yet a new direction. Returning to his Fine Art beginnings he began to make art born of his reflections on historical events. He created a body of large three-dimensional paintings exploring the devastations of war and the ravages man has made upon the environment caused by recent conflicts in Eastern Europe and the Middle East with solo exhibitions: 'FRONTIERS' at the Timber Yard, London in 2005, 'ANGELS' at the Royal Institute of British Architects, London in 2006 and the British High Commission, India in 2007, 'MOTHERLANDS' at the Louise T Blouin Foundation, London in 2007, 'COUNTRY' at Wolverhampton Art Gallery, Wolverhampton 2009 and 'BABYLON' at Flowers East Gallery, London 2009. Judah's work 'THE CRUSADER' was on show between November 2010 and November 2011 as part of the Artist Reactions series in the Imperial War Museum North, Manchester. Judah has also exhibited internationally with the inaugural exhibition 'COUNTRY' at Fitzroy Gallery, New York in December 2010.

In 2014, St Paul's Cathedral commissioned Judah to create an artwork in the nave of the cathedral to commemorate the 100th anniversary of the beginning of the First World War. This resulted in two spectacular sculptures consisting of three-dimensional white cruciforms to reflect the meticulously maintained war graves of northern France and further afield. Each sculpture is also embellished with miniaturised destroyed residential blocks depicting war zones in the Middle East – Syria, Baghdad, Afghanistan – thus connecting one hundred years of warfare.

== See also ==
Goodwood Festival of Speed Central Display
