= McMurtry Spéirling =

McMurtry Spéirling Pure
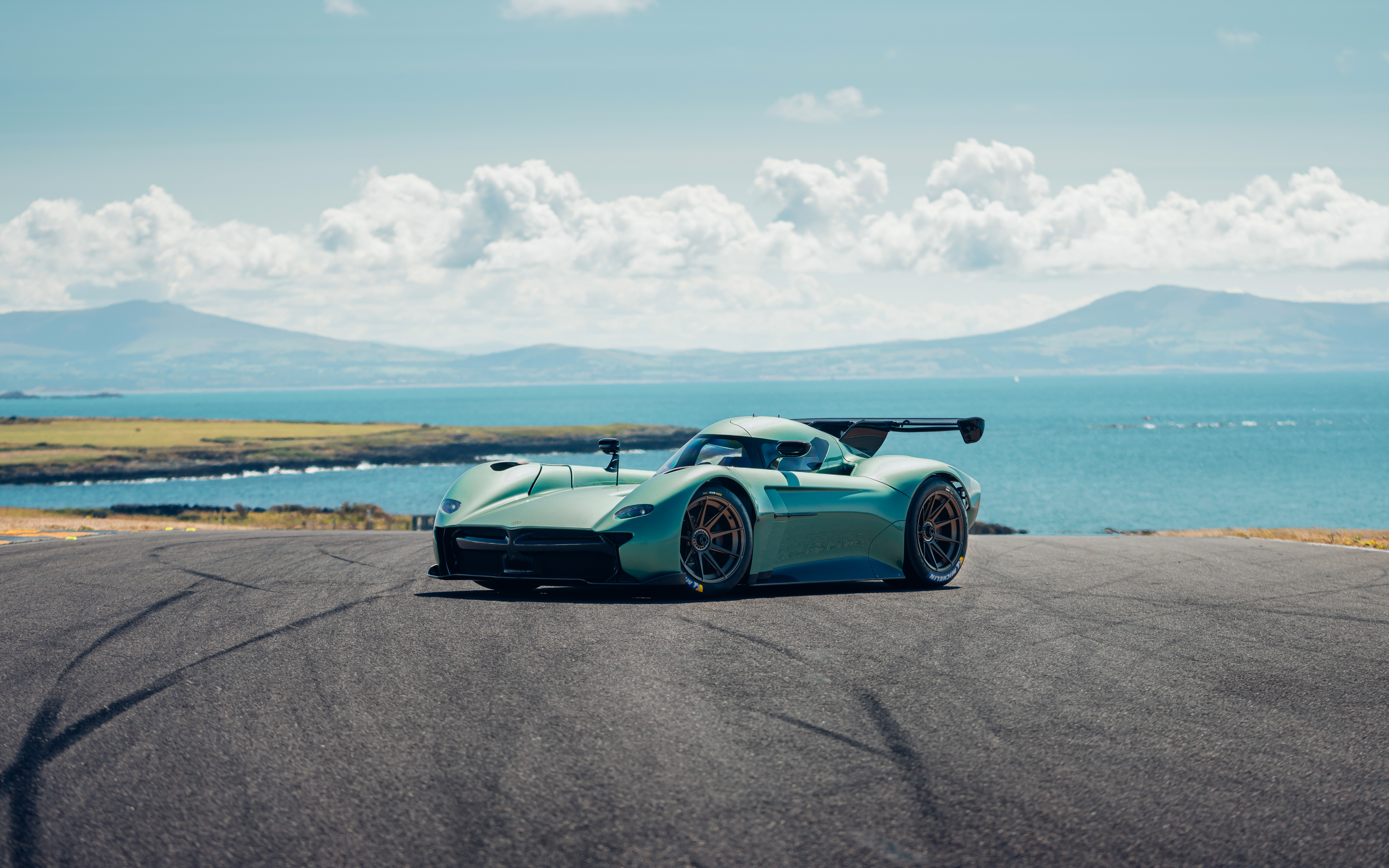

Overview
- Manufacturer: McMurtry Automotive
- Production: 2026
- Designer: Andries van Overbeeke

Body and chassis
- Class: Sports prototype
- Body style: Fastback
- Layout: RR

Powertrain
- Electric motor: Twin motors
- Power output: 746 kW (1,000 hp)
- Battery: 100 kWh Molicel
- Electric range: >483 km (300 miles) (WLTP)
- Plug-in charging: 600 kW

Dimensions
- Wheelbase: 2,200 mm (86.6 in)
- Length: 3,815 mm (150.2 in)
- Width: 1,795 mm (70.7 in)
- Height: 1,050 mm (41.3 in)
- Kerb weight: Under 1,000 kg (2,200 lb)

The McMurtry Spéirling is an electric single-seat hypercar which was first presented at the Goodwood Festival of Speed in 2021. The car is developed by McMurtry Automotive, a British registered startup founded on 2 June 2016 by Sir David McMurtry (co-founder and executive chairman of Renishaw plc). "Spéirling" is Irish for "thunderstorm".

A distinguishing feature of the car is its use of "active downforce", achieved through integrated fans that generate suction to increase grip, even while stationary. This system provides a significant advantage at low speeds. Demonstrations have shown the car operating on an inverted rotating platform, indicating that the generated downforce can exceed the vehicle's weight. Similar fan-based systems had previously been used in motor racing during the 1970s (Chaparral 2J, Brabham BT46B) but were later banned.

In July 2026, McMurtry Automotive unveiled the final production version of the Spéirling PURE. Compared with the prototype models, the production car incorporates approximately 95% new components, including revisions to the powertrain, chassis, aerodynamics, and interior. The production-specification Spéirling PURE made its public debut at the 2026 Monterey Car Week, with its first public appearance at The Quail, A Motorsports Gathering.

== History ==
According to McMurtry, the motivation behind the car was to challenge the industry trend of increasingly heavier vehicles and, by using first principles design, create a lightweight electric driver's car. The prototype car is the first step to demonstrate what customers will experience on road and track. It is not currently in a racing series but is built to satisfy relevant motorsport safety requirements, with crash structures and a carbon-fibre monocoque chassis with integral rollover protection. Its unique performance differentiator is the fan-powered downforce system, producing 2,000 kg (4,400 lb) of downforce at a standstill.

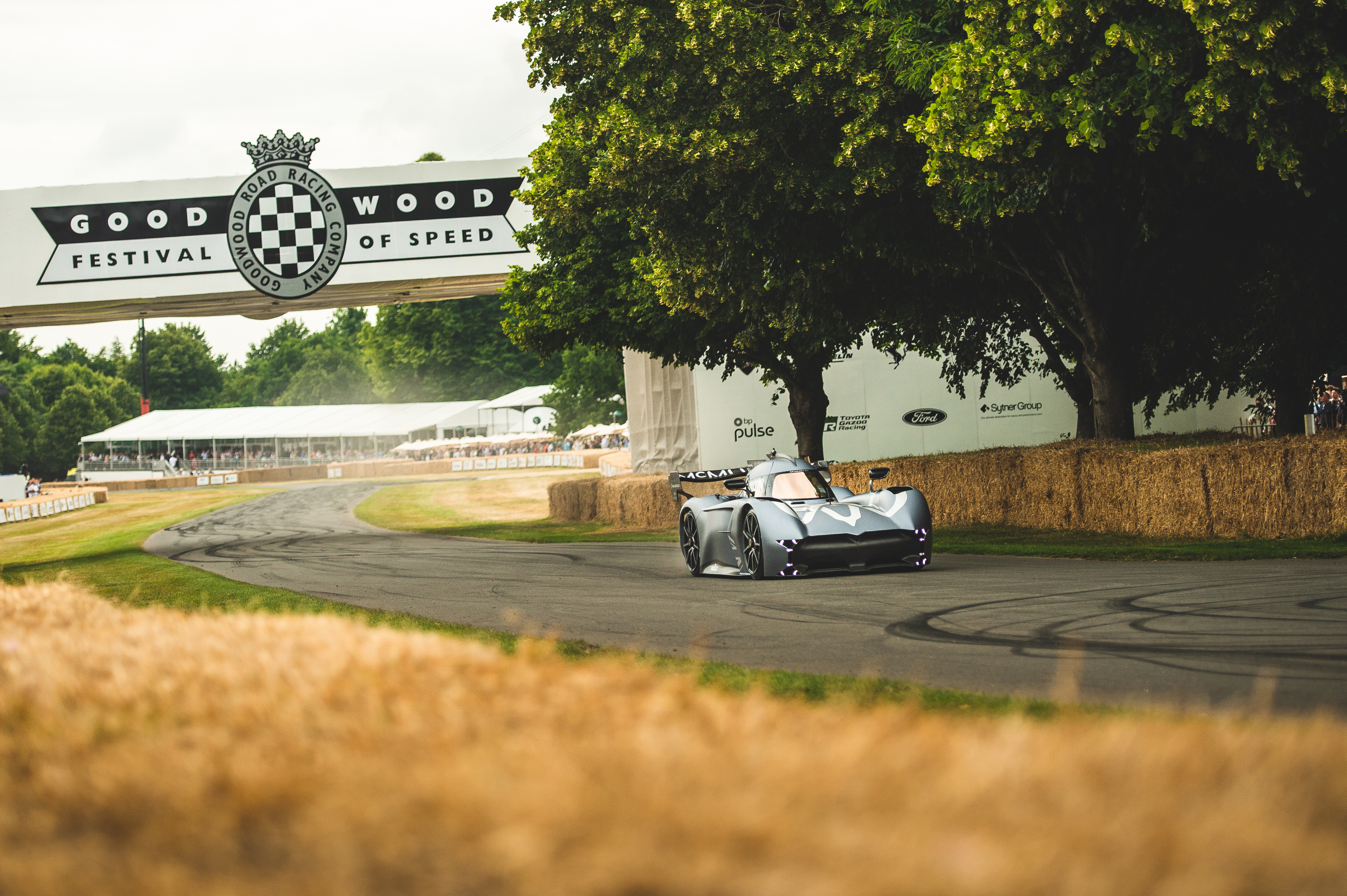
The McMurtry Spéirling prototype, driven by Max Chilton, during its record-breaking run at the 2022 Goodwood Festival of Speed.

The car, developed in secrecy over three years, was first presented at the Goodwood Festival of Speed on 8 July 2021, and driven by Derek Bell.

In December 2022, it set the following times verified by independent GPS timing without rollout by Mat Watson from carwow on Silverstone:

- 0-97 km/h (60 mph) in 1.55 seconds
- 0-161 km/h (100 mph) in 2.63 seconds
- 0-233 km/h (145 mph) in 4.98 seconds
- 400 m (approx. 1/4 mile) in 7.97 seconds

When considering the 1/4 mile time, the car had a 249 km/h (155 mph) top speed for roughly the last 3 seconds of the run. The car also ran on bespoke drag slicks and was not a production car model.

== Specifications ==
Below are the specifications for the Spéirling PURE:

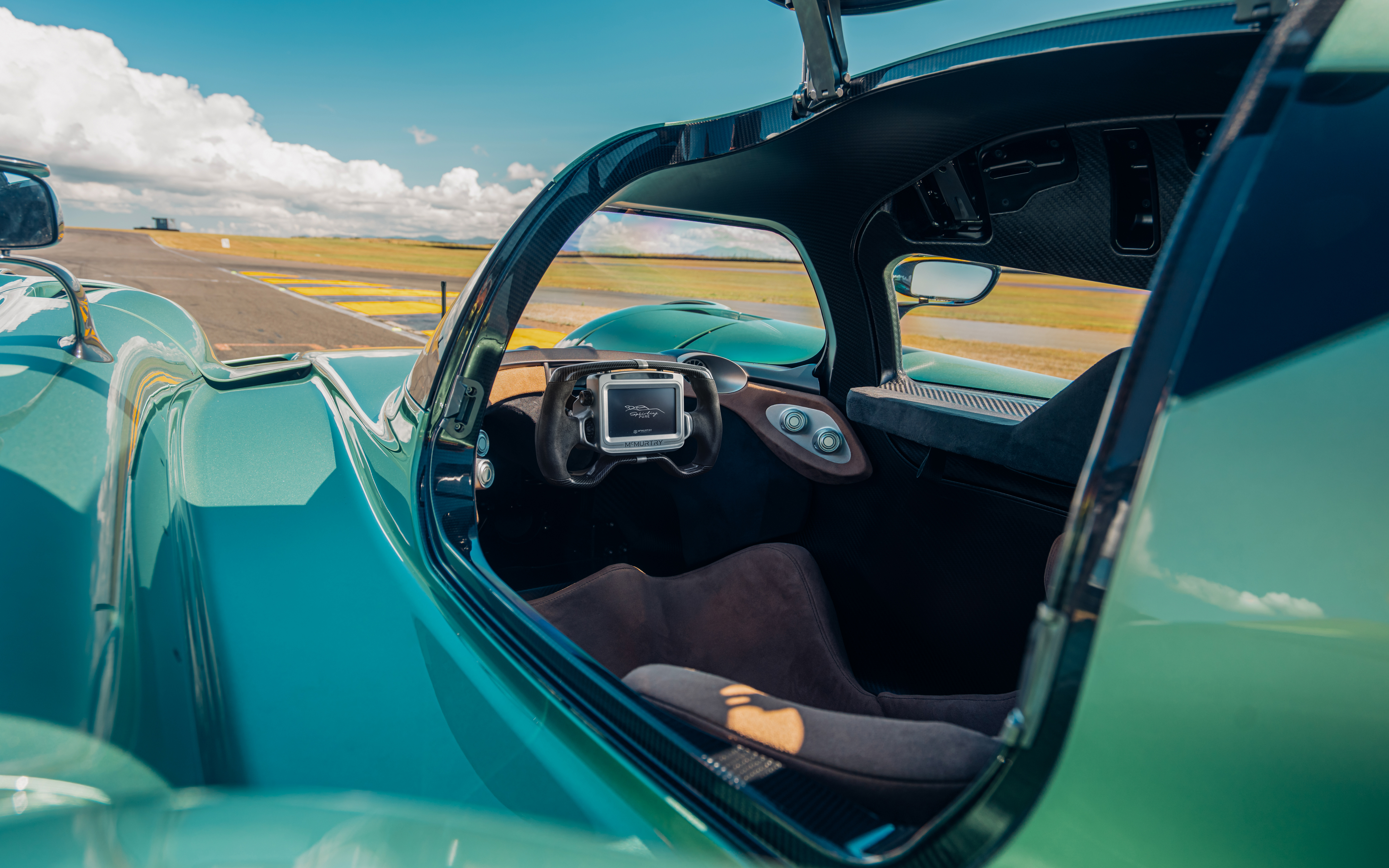
2026 McMurtry Spéirling Pure Interior

- Peak power output: 745 kW (1,000 hp)
- Top speed: 306 km/h (190 mph)
- 0-97 km/h (60 mph) in 1.55 seconds
- 400 m (approx. 1/4 mile) in 7.97 seconds (with top speed limited at 249 km/h (155 mph))
- Weight: 900 kg (1,980 lb)
- Battery capacity: 100 kWh
- Rear wheel drive

With a driving distance on a race track of up to 50km at LMP2 Pace.

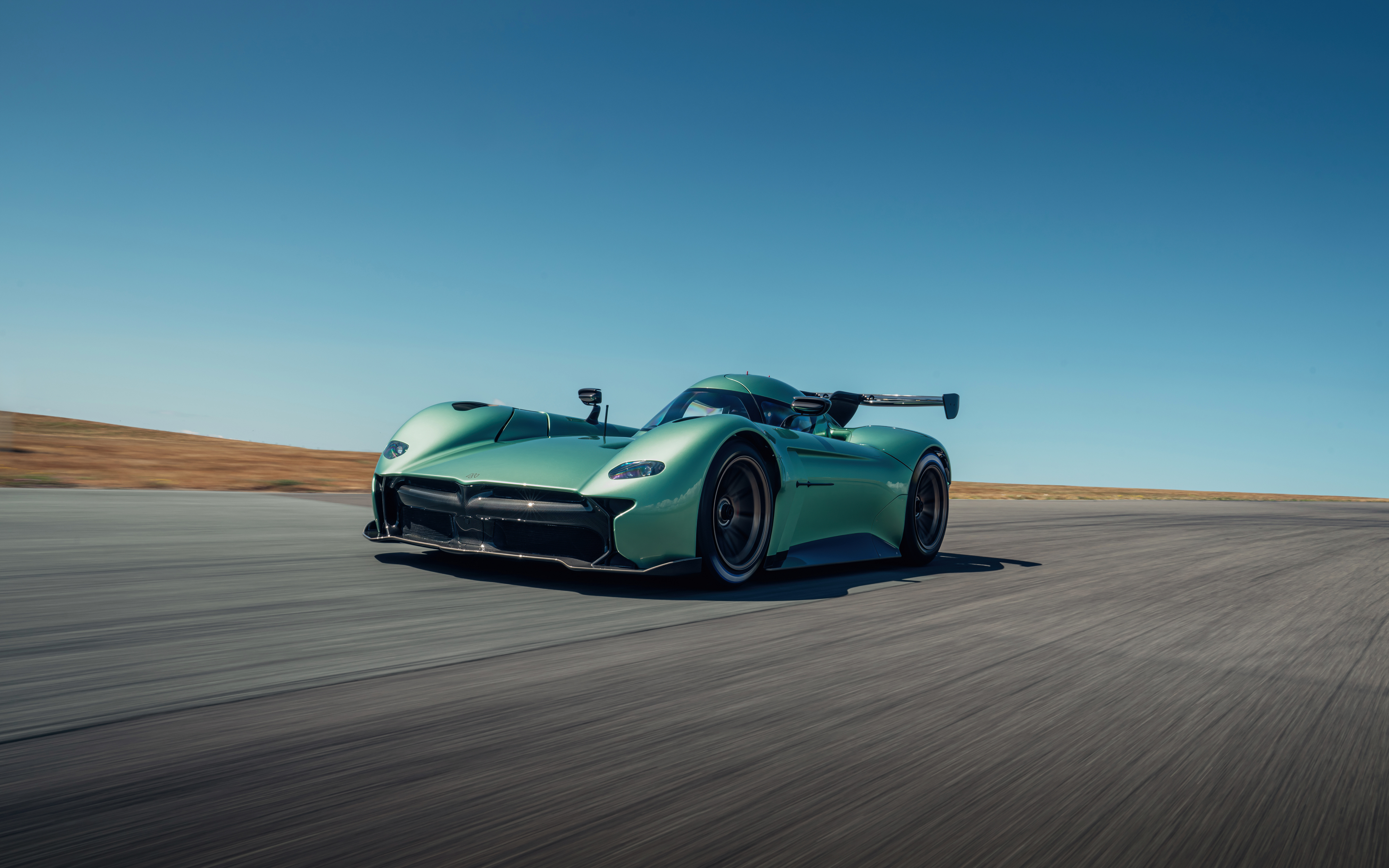
McMurtry Spéirling Pure on track in 2026

The car has rear-wheel drive using two electric motors placed inside a specially designed. "e-axle", and uses carbon brakes. The monocoque has room for a driver 150.0 to 204.3 cm (4.921 to 6.703 ft) tall. The battery is integrated into a separate safety cell inside the monocoque.

=== Active downforce ===
A special design aspect of the car is its active downforce system without the use of large splitters or wings, by means of twin fans which provide an extra 2,000 kg (4,400 lb) of downforce from a standstill. This allows the car to corner at a G-force of more than 3g. When the fans are at full speed, they emit about 120 dB of noise.

The use of fans powered by separate motors to provide downforce was first conceived of by Jim Hall for the Chaparral 2J, a Can-Am car he designed, constructed and raced in 1970. However, the 2J was banned at the end of the 1970 Can-Am series. A downforce fan system was also used in the Brabham BT46B Formula One car, which was designed by Gordon Murray. It won its only race, the 1978 Swedish Grand Prix, before the car was withdrawn from racing by Brabham and the technology was banned for the following season.

=== Tyres ===
The production-specification Spéirling PURE uses commercially available Michelin racing slick tyres rather than bespoke compounds. The front tyres are 30/68-18 Michelin Pilot Sport GT S8M units, while the rear tyres are 31/71-18 Michelin Pilot Sport GT S8M units. McMurtry states that these tyres are available worldwide through Michelin's motorsport network.

== Records ==
=== Goodwood Festival of speed ===
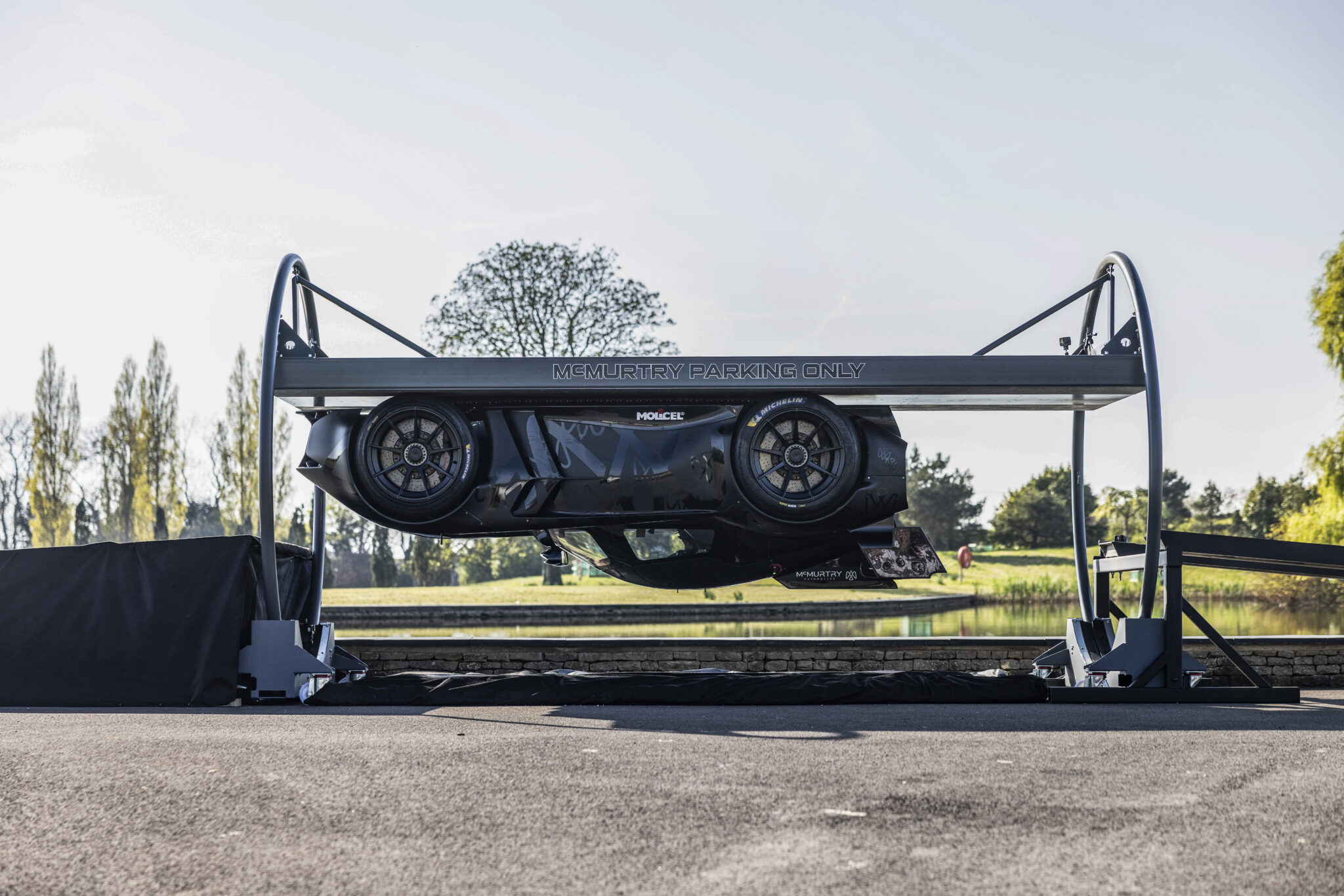
Thomas Yates, Managing Director of McMurtry Automotive, driving the McMurtry Spéirling during the world's first successful inverted driving demonstration at Swinhay House in 2025.

On 26 June 2022, the Spéirling achieved a new Goodwood Festival of Speed hill climb record, completing the 1.87-kilometre (1.16 mi) course in 39.08 seconds with McMurtry test driver Max Chilton behind the wheel.

=== Upside down ===
On 11 April 2025, the McMurtry Spéirling PURE Validation Prototype 1 (VP1) was driven upside down for five seconds by Thomas Yates, McMurtry Automotive co-founder.

=== Top Gear ===
On 11 April 2025, the McMurtry Spéirling, driven by the Stig, set a new Top Gear circuit record, beating the Renault R24, which had held the record since 2004, by more than three seconds.

== See also ==
=== Comparable electric cars ===
- Volkswagen I.D. R
- Rimac Nevera
- Aspark Owl
- Pininfarina Battista
- Tesla Roadster (second generation)

=== Other fan cars ===
- Gordon Murray Automotive T.50
- Brabham BT46
- Chaparral 2J
