= Goodwood Festival of Speed =

British annual motorsport event

Coordinates: 50°52′5″N 0°44′5″W

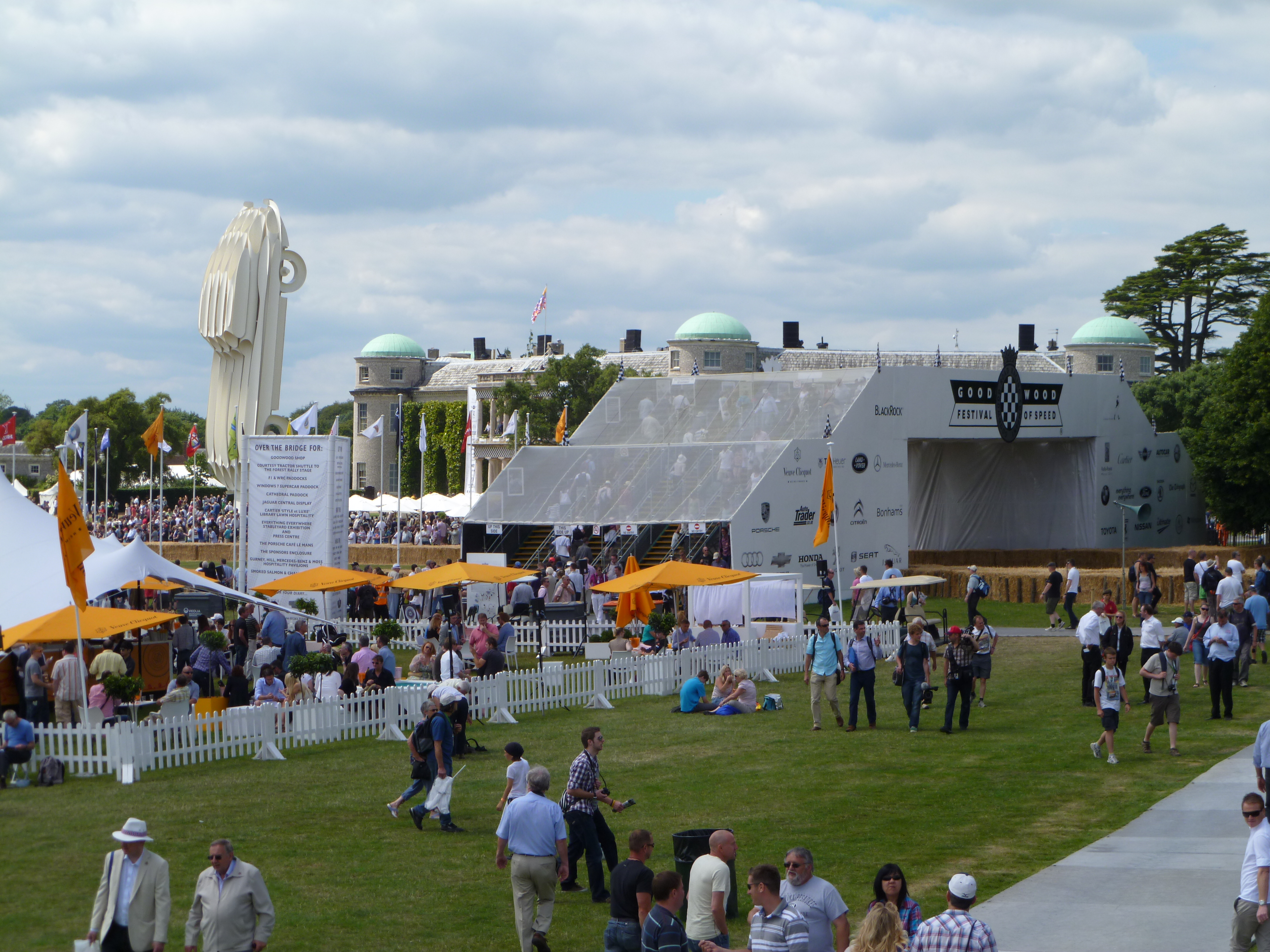
- Festival of Speed, 2011
- Location: Goodwood House, West Sussex, England
- Owner: Charles Gordon-Lennox, 11th Duke of Richmond
- Opened: 1993
- Website: Official website

Hillclimb
- Length: 1.86 km (1.16 mi)
- Turns: 9
- Race lap record: 0:39.081 (Max Chilton, McMurtry Spéirling, 2022)

Forest Rally Stage
- Length: 2.5 km (1.6 mi)

The Goodwood Festival of Speed is a British annual motorsports festival featuring modern and historic motor racing vehicles taking part in a hillclimb and other events, held at Goodwood, West Sussex, England, in late June or early July. The event is scheduled to avoid clashing with the Formula One season, enabling fans to see F1 machines as well as cars and motorbikes from motor racing history.

In the early years of the Festival, which started in 1993, tens of thousands attended over the weekend. As of 2014, it attracted crowds of around 100,000 on each of the three days it was held. A record crowd of 158,000 attended in 2003, before an advance-ticket-only admission policy came into force; attendance was subsequently capped at 150,000.

== History ==
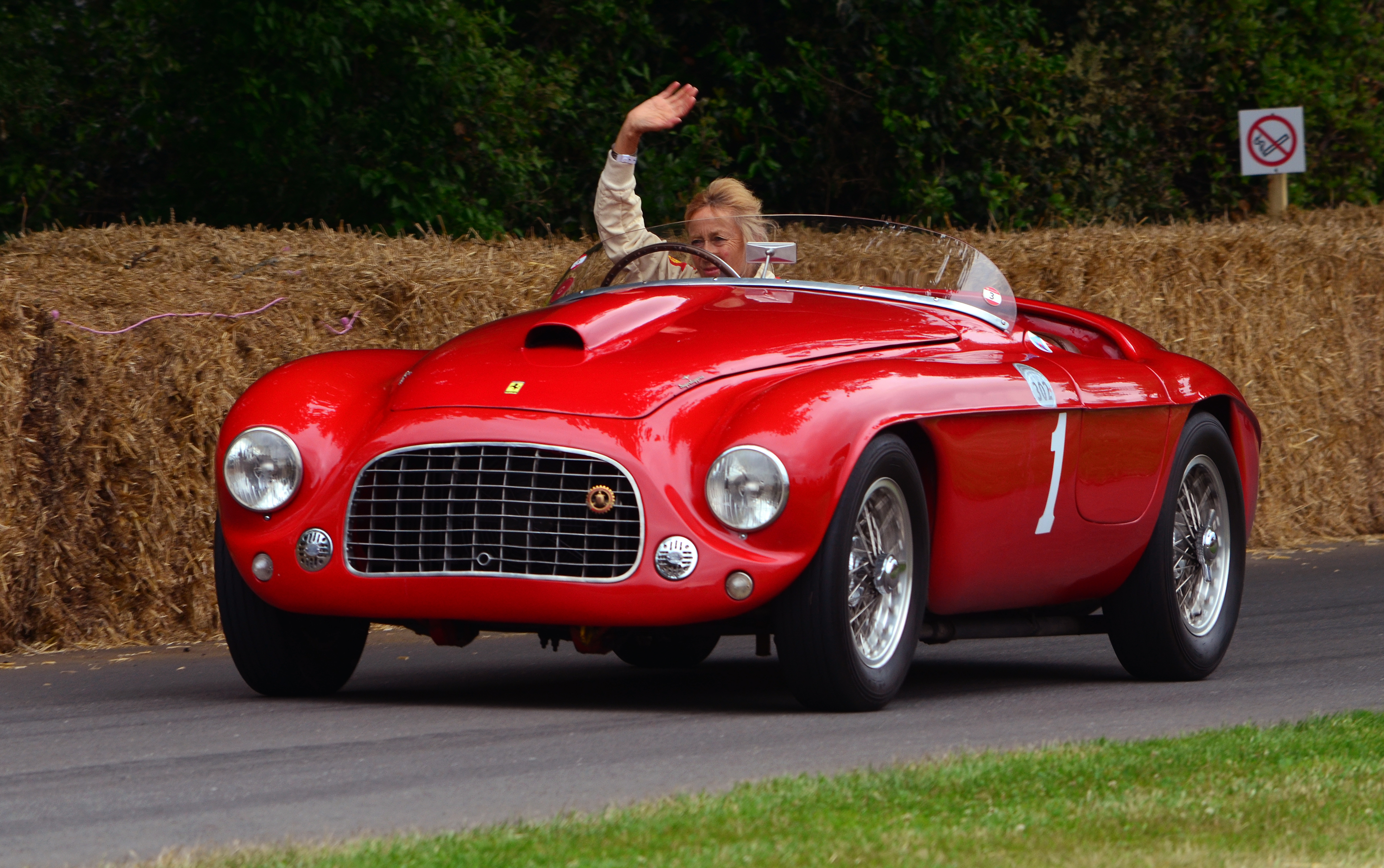
The first pairing to climb the Goodwood hill in 1993 was Sally Mason-Styrron and her Ferrari 166 MM Barchetta, seen here at the 2022 event.

The Goodwood Festival of Speed was founded in 1993 by the then Lord March (now the Duke of Richmond) in order to bring motor racing back to the Goodwood estate – a location steeped in British motor racing history. Shortly after taking over the estate in the early 1990s, Lord March wanted to bring back motor racing to Goodwood Circuit, but did not have the necessary permit to host a race there. Therefore, he instead hosted it on his own grounds.

With a small selection of entrants made up of invited historic vehicles, the first event that took place on Sunday 20 June proved to be a success, taking in a crowd of 25,000 despite a date clash with the 24 Hours of Le Mans that year. The first driver to tackle the event's hillclimb course was Sally Mason-Styrron, in her Ferrari 166 MM Barchetta. After the second event also clashed with Le Mans, Lord March ensured that future events would never clash with either Le Mans or Formula One races.

In 1994, Saturday was added, making it a weekend event. In 1996, Friday was added, making it a three-day event. In 2010, the Moving Motor Show was added on the Thursday.

The 2020 event was scheduled for July 9–12, but it was cancelled then later run in October combined with other events at Goodwood Motor Circuit. Due to the COVID-19 pandemic, the event was held without spectators but streamed online and shown on terrestrial TV. The event was modified to incorporate historic cars from the Revival, rally/sprint cars from the Member's Meeting, and an attempt to set a new track record.

The 2021 event returned to its full spectator capacity and to its original location and was held from July 8-11.

The organisers cancelled the Saturday schedule of the 2023 festival due to severe weather warnings.

== Features and attractions ==
=== Hillclimb ===
Hillclimb layout

The event is classified as a hillclimb and visitors are accorded close access to that part of the track. The 1,890 metres (1.17 miles), 9-turn track climbs 92.7 metres (304 ft), an average gradient of 4.9%. Its record time was set in 2022 by Max Chilton in an electric McMurtry Spéirling at 39.081 seconds. The record was held for 20 years by a Formula 1 (F1) car, set at 41.6 seconds by Nick Heidfeld in 1999 in a McLaren MP4/13 – the then-reigning F1 World Constructors' Champion car. While F1 cars ran until 2023, they did not break the 1999 record. For safety reasons F1 cars can no longer use tyre warmers or do official timed runs so instead perform demonstrations. The record time (but not the record) was already lowered in 2019 to 39.90 seconds in practice by the Volkswagen ID.R prototype electric race car, driven by Romain Dumas.

The Alpine Alpenglow Hy6 hydrogen car was refuelled by Fuel Cell Systems at the Goodwood Festival of Speed 2025, marking a significant moment in the demonstration of hydrogen-powered vehicles in motorsport.

=== Soapbox challenge ===
From 2000 to 2004 the Soapbox Challenge was a downhill race for gravity-powered cars. Starting from just below the hill-climb finish line, to a finish line in front of the house. It included entries from Cosworth, Prodrive, and other top companies, with some famous riders/drivers piloting them, including Barry Sheene. However, there were frequent accidents. Despite an official cap on the cost of cars, the unofficial costs were becoming too high, so it did not return in 2005. However, it did return in 2013. Companies such as Bentley and McLaren competed.

=== Forest Rally Stage ===
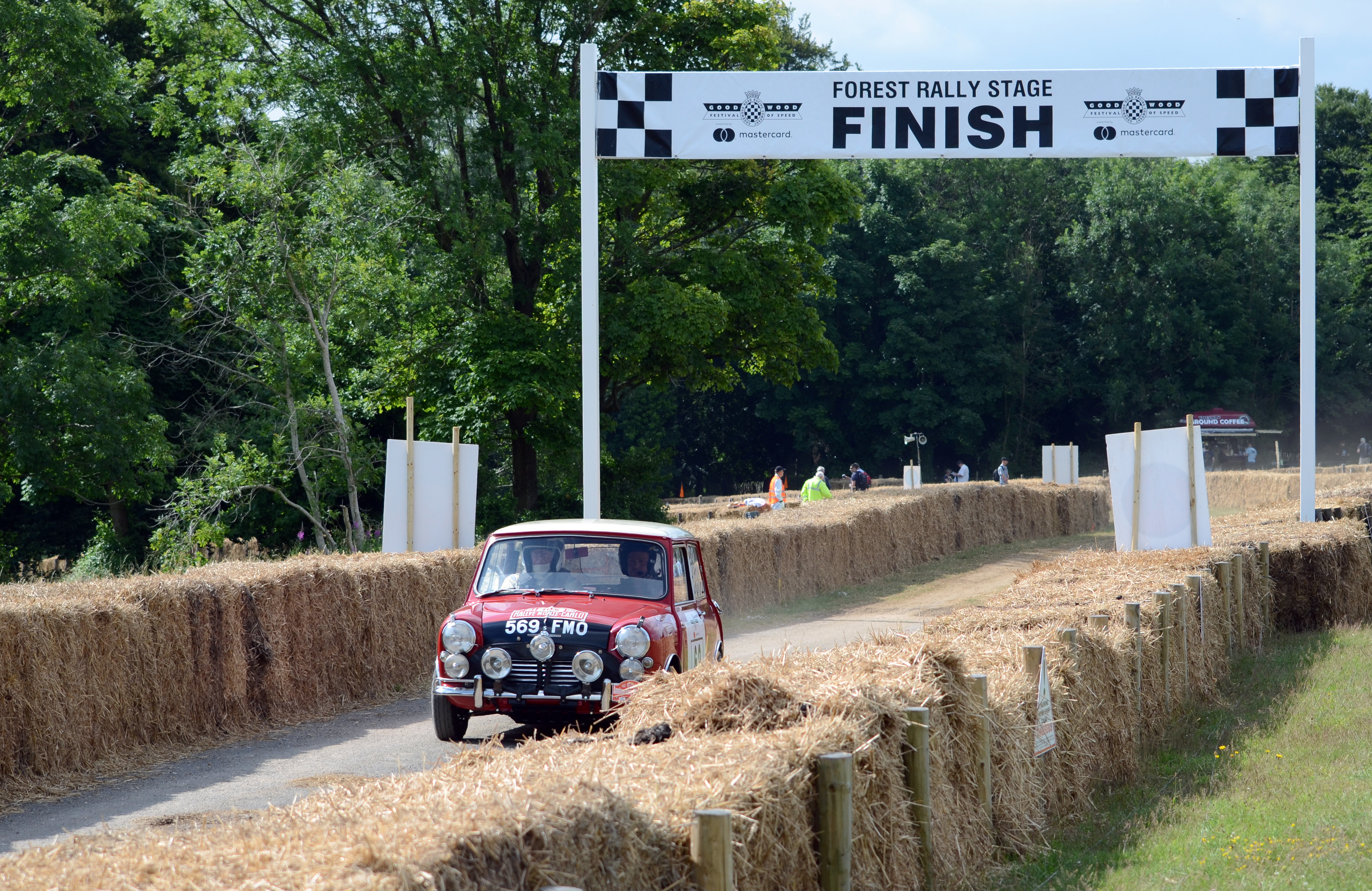
Mini Cooper S crossing the finish line of Forest Rally Stage

From 2005 to present there has been a demonstration area for the rally cars at the top of the hill. Ever since its inception Southern Car Club have been entrusted with the organization of the rally stage, held under a Motorsport UK permit.

Initially, in 2005, an existing track through the forest was widened, and the rally cars ran down through the forest, turned about on the tarmac section just outside the wood, and returned up the same track. This meant that the cars could only run one-at-a-time.

In 2006, a full forest stage was introduced, designed by Hannu Mikkola as a complete circuit, with a separate start and finish line at the top of the wood. This allowed the cars to start at timed intervals, allowing many more cars to run.

=== Supercar Paddock ===
Since 2000, the Festival has hosted the Supercar Paddock for road-going supercars. Since 2014 cars could opt to do a timed run. It is now common for specialty car manufacturers to show off their latest sports model, including newly released mass-produced sports models and working concept models.

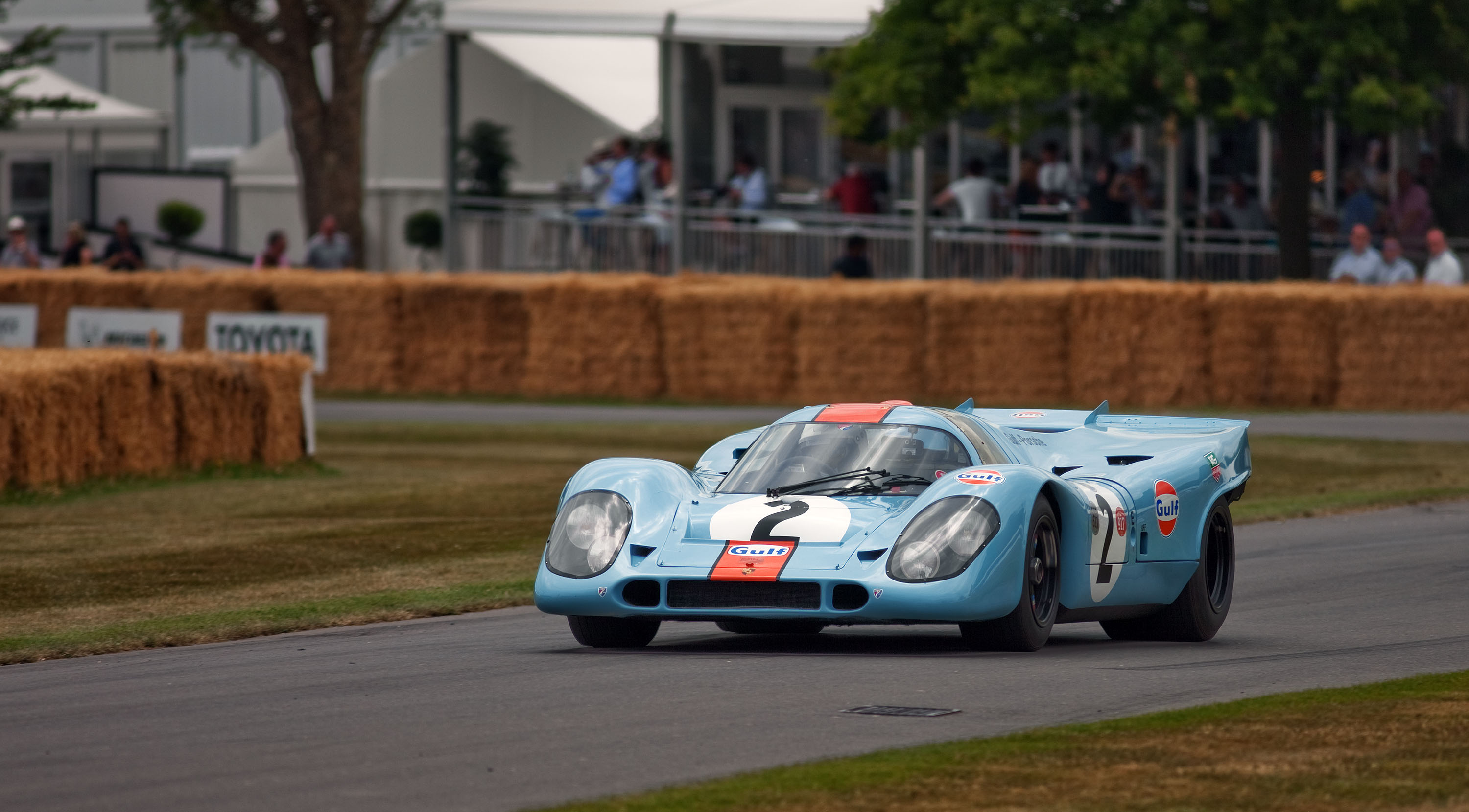
1970 Porsche 917 going up the hill at the 2019 Goodwood Festival of Speed

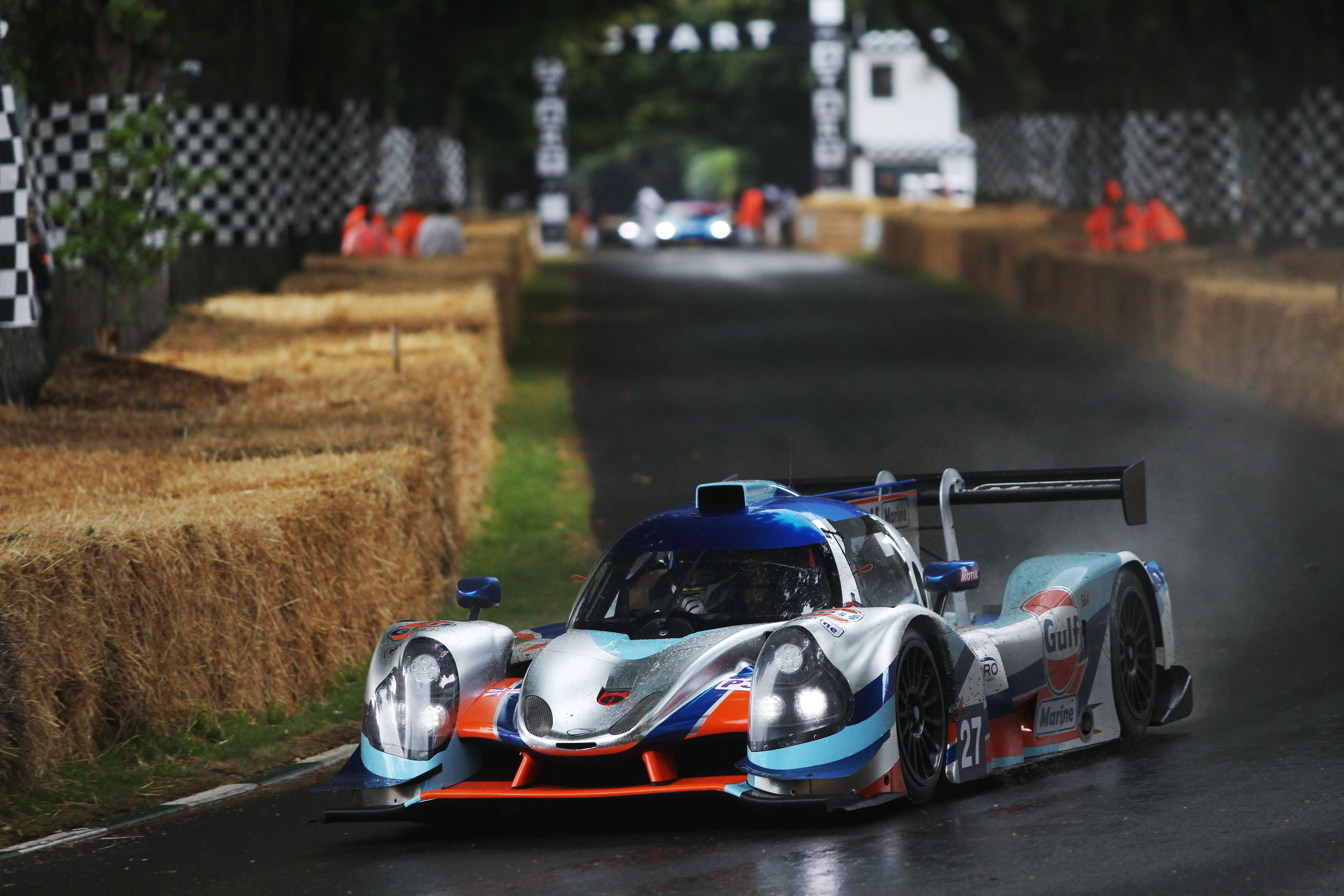
2014–2018 vintage Ligier JS P3 at the 2019 Goodwood Festival of Speed

=== The Arena ===
The Arena is a new for 2019 attraction that showcases drifting and stunt driving. It is a large tarmac area that used to contain the Michelin Supercar Paddock, with 2 barrel donuts and 2 wall rides with a large viewing area just above the drift paddock. Spectators can watch stunt shows throughout the course of the day, the drift competition, and the hillclimb shootout on the big screen.

=== Future Lab ===
Officially the future science and technology pavilion at the Festival since 2017. Several major global reveals have debuted as part of this exhibition, including autonomous trucks by Einride, prototype flying cars like Airspeeder and autonomous delivery vehicle kar-go. The 2025 event included a 1.5 metres (4 ft 11 in) 3D-printed exhibit of Ernest Shackleton's ship Endurance as part of the Seabed 2030 project.

=== Cartier Style et Luxe ===
Begun in 1995, this is an auto show which takes place to the west of the house. It is a similar format to the Pebble Beach Concours d'Elegance. Entry is usually by invitation, and this provides some leeway as to which type of vehicle can enter, usually resulting in a more varied event than usual Concours d'Elegance. Unlike most concours shows, the Cartier Style et Luxe is judged by a panel of selected judges consisting of celebrities from all around the world to car designers.

=== Moving Motor Show ===
From 2010 until 2018, the Moving Motor Show, was added. Mainly in response to the cancellation of the British International Motor Show aimed exclusively for buyers of new cars, allowing them a chance to test the cars on the course. Following its success, it was announced the MMS would return in 2011.

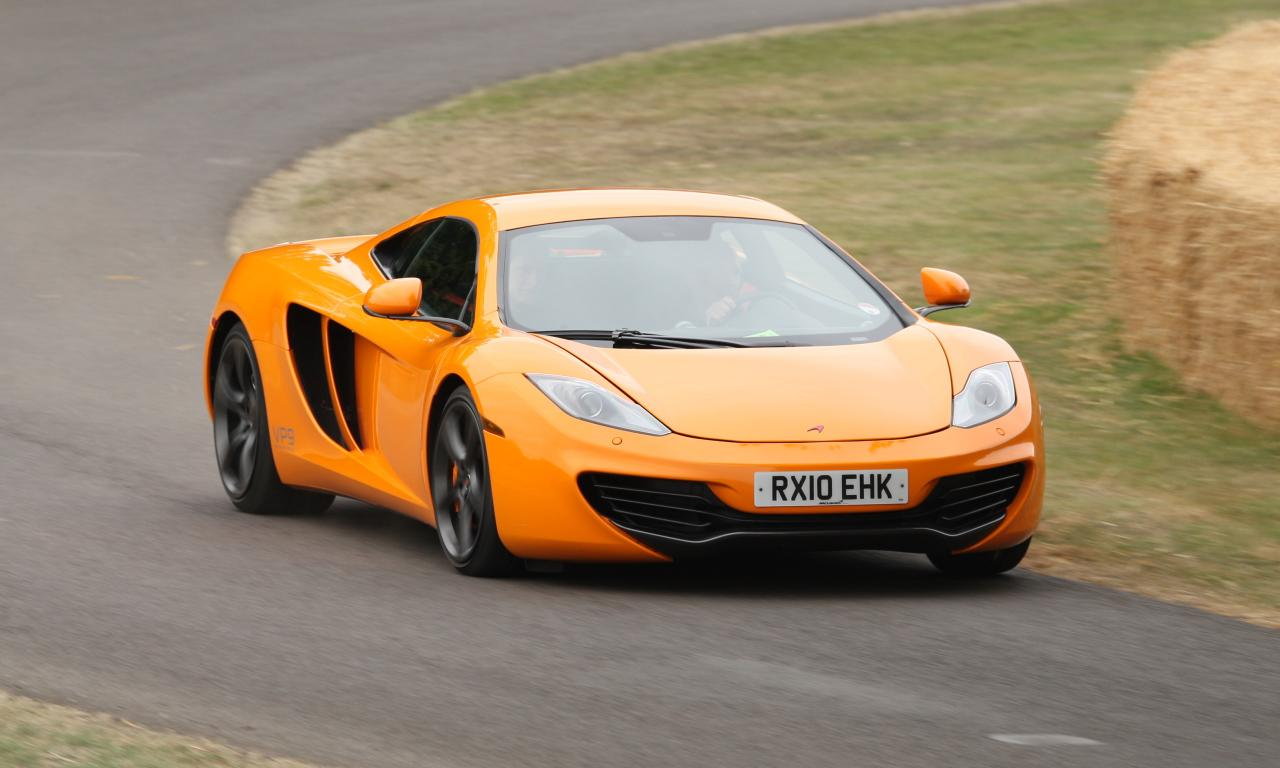
Newly introduced McLaren MP4-12C at the 2010 Festival of Speed

The 2010 event also included the running of the new McLaren MP4-12C.

The official website listed the Festival of Speed dates as the Friday to Sunday, but the weekend tickets for the Festival included a moving motor show ticket. From 2019, the Festival of Speed has been a four day event with no moving motor show. So it's not strictly part of the Festival of Speed, but it is a part of the Festival of Speed weekend.

=== Other ===
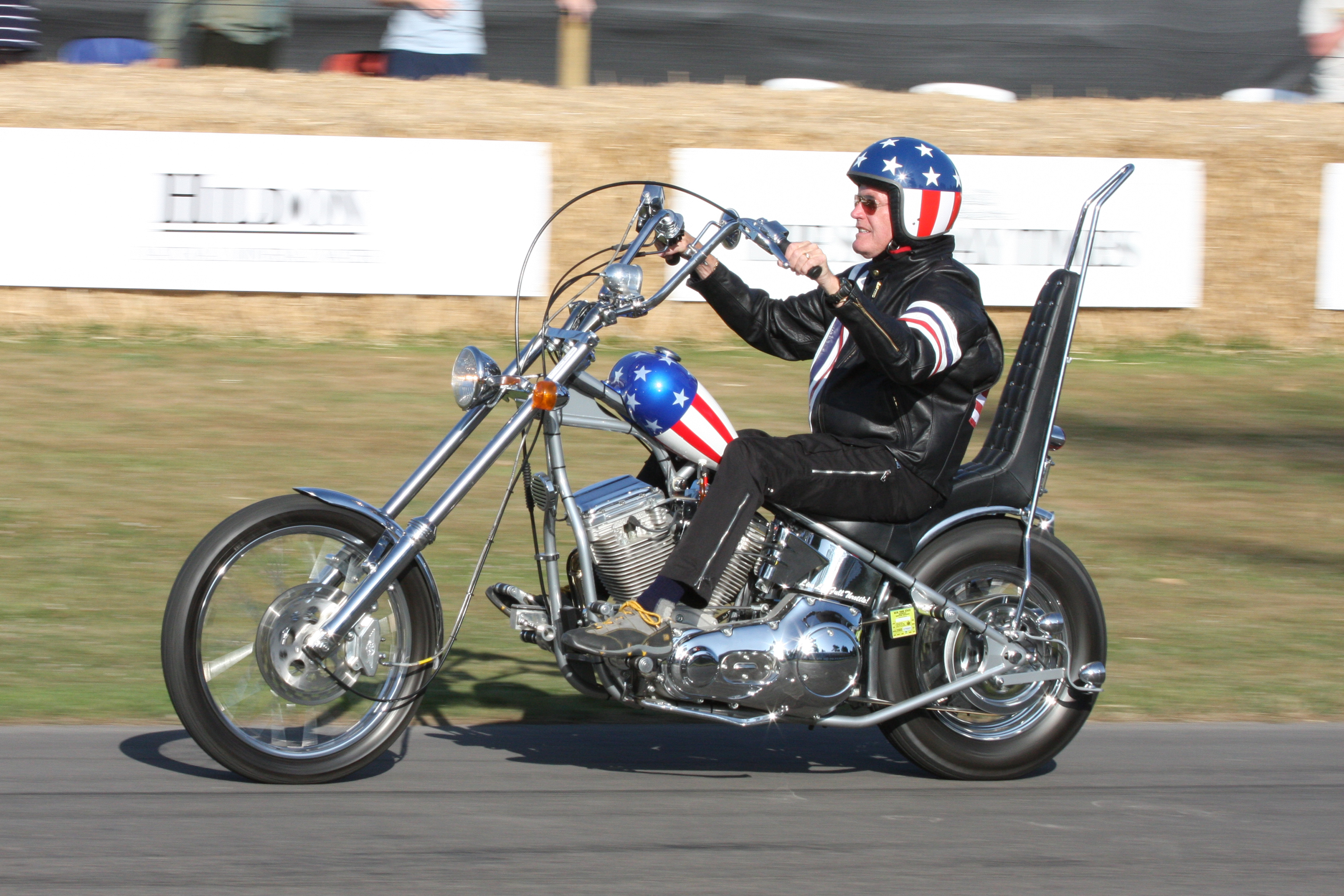
Peter Fonda at the 2009 FoS, riding a replica of his 1969 Easy Rider ″Captain America″ Harley-Davidson chopper

V8 era F1 car echoing in the grounds of Goodwood House.

1934 Mercedes-Benz W25 starting the hillclimb.

A Spyker C8 Aileron pulling away from the start of the hillclimb in 2009.

Other popular attractions at the event are the real life replicas of the Wacky Races cars (Thursday was known as Press preview day, then incorporated The Moving Motor Show), which serves to provide lunchtime entertainment for the crowds, and the airshows, which usually include the RAF and Red Arrows. Flybys have included an RAF Tornado, a low-flying Boeing 747 in 2004 and 2005, and a low-flying Airbus A380 in 2008.

From the festival's beginning, poster art had been illustrated by renowned motor racing artist Peter Hearsey until his retirement in 2015. In 2016, the poster art was designed by Klaus Wagger, who rose to prominence as a racing artist when he won a competition to design the official poster for Mille Miglia in 2000.

In recent years, they have also put on the GAS Arena (Goodwood Action Sports) who showcase extreme stunts such as Freestyle Motorcross, BMX and Trial bike Riding.

In 2018, for the first time at the Festival – as part of the Future Lab exhibition – a driverless Roborace racing car negotiated the course, and a virtual passenger seat experience was made available online. In 2019, the car made an official run in 66.96 seconds.

FOS events contain balcony moments where motorsports stars are interviewed on the Goodwood House balcony to celebrate their career and the festival of speed. Notable balcony moments include the MotoGP legends, Red Bull Racing, and seven F1 World Champions.

=== Sister event ===
The Festival of Speed has a sister event, the Goodwood Revival Meeting. This event, normally held in early September, relives the glory days of motor racing at the Goodwood Motor Racing Circuit.

== Incidents ==
There have been two fatal accidents at the event.

The first was during its inaugural meeting in 1993, when vintage racing motorcyclist Chas Guy was killed in practice following the completion of the course when his Vincent motorcycle developed a steering wobble known as a tank slapper, throwing the rider into a tree. Since then, motorcycles are not timed for their run.

In 2000, driver John Dawson-Damer lost control of his Lotus 63, and crashed into the finish line gantry, killing himself, a marshal Andrew Carpenter, and seriously injuring another, Steve Tarrant, who sustained serious injuries, including the loss of his leg.

== Central display ==
Aston Martin set up a central display for the first Festival of Speed in 1993. Since 1997, the display erected on the lawn in front of Goodwood House has been designed by the sculptor Gerry Judah. The displays honoured car marques until 2017, when for the first time it honoured a career, that of Bernie Ecclestone. This is a list of the temporary monuments:

Year	Photo	Subject	Featured vehicles (on the main display)	Comment	Ref.
1997		Ferrari	Ferrari F310B	50th anniversary	
1998		Porsche	Porsche 936/81; Porsche 917-20 "Pink Pig"; Porsche 917 LH; Porsche 956; Porsche 911 GT1	50th anniversary	
1999		Audi	Audi Avus quattro Auto Union Type C Streamliner	Depicts the banking of Avus as if the cars are racing together. The Streamliner is a replica built especially for the display	
2000		Jaguar	Jaguar E-Type; Jaguar XK120; Jaguar C-Type; Jaguar D-Type; Jaguar XJR-5; Jaguar XJR-8	Depicts the cat's cradle. Celebrating its F1 debut	
2001		Mercedes-Benz	Mercedes-Benz 300SL	100th anniversary, resembling a gush of liquid, falling and spreading as it hits the ground.	
2002		Renault	Renault RS01; Renault RE40; Renault RE60; Williams-Renault FW14; Benetton-Renault B195; Williams-Renault FW18; Renault R202	Honouring its comeback in F1 racing. Depicting a feather	
2003	The Ford Central Display at the 2003 Goodwood Festival of Speed. Designed by Gerry Judah	Ford	Ford GT40 Mk. II	100th anniversary. Depicting the 1966 24 Hours of Le Mans race and its famous finish. As the actual cars were on track, those displayed are replicas.	
2004	The Rolls-Royce Central Display at the 2004 Goodwood Festival of Speed. Designed by Gerry Judah	Rolls-Royce	Supermarine S.6; Campbell-Railton Blue Bird; Bluebird K4 replica	100th anniversary, indicating the brand's supremacy in record breaking on land, sea and air	
2005		Honda	Honda RA272; Honda RA300; Lotus-Honda 99T; Williams-Honda FW11; McLaren-Honda MP4/4; BAR-Honda 006	40th anniversary of its first Formula One victory. For the first time, the arms moved, raising and lowering the cars.	
2006	The Renault Central Display at the 2006 Goodwood Festival of Speed. Designed by Gerry Judah	Renault	Renault Type AK 90CV; Renault R26	100th anniversary of Grand Prix racing. Used as a shelter for its Formula One cars that is designed to channel sound. Using a laptop, the cars can produce music out of its engine. Two tunes were performed, one of those played is God Save the Queen	
2007		Toyota	Toyota TS010; Toyota Celica GT-Four; Toyota GT-One; Lola-Toyota B2/00; Toyota TF107	Inspired by the traditional torii gates. Celebrating its 75th anniversary and 50 years involvement in motor sport.	
2008		Land Rover	Land Rover Defender; Land Rover Discovery; Land Rover Freelander; Range Rover	60th anniversary. Indicating the brand's "any terrain" essence by depicting a rock.	
2009		Audi	Audi R8; Auto Union Type C Streamliner	100th anniversary sculpture depicting the road from the streamliner to the R8 forming a loop in front of the house.	
2010		Alfa Romeo	Alfa Romeo P2; Alfa Romeo 8C Competizione	100th anniversary	
2011		Jaguar	Jaguar E-Type	Celebrating 50 years of the model	
2012		Lotus	Lotus 49; Lotus 79; Lotus 99T; Lotus E20	'Past, Present and Future'	
2013		Porsche	Porsche 911; Porsche 911 Carrera RS 2.7; Porsche 911 991	50th anniversary of 911	
2014		Mercedes-Benz	Mercedes-Benz W25; Mercedes AMG W04	120 years in motorsport: an arch over Goodwood House	
2015		Mazda	Mazda 787B; Mazda LM55 Vision Gran Turismo	Celebrating Mazda's Challenger Spirit with both the racing legends of its illustrious sporting past and the stylish cars of its current range.	
2016	The BMW Central Display at the 2016 Goodwood Festival of Speed. Designed by Gerry Judah	BMW	BMW 328 Mille Miglia Roadster; Brabham-BMW BT52; BMW V12 LMR	BMW Motorsport success	
2017		Bernie Ecclestone	Connaught Type B Lotus 72; Brabham BT49; Ferrari F2001; Mercedes F1 W07	In 2017, for the first time ever, the Central Feature celebrated an individual rather than a marque: Bernie Ecclestone, the man responsible for transforming Formula 1 into a multibillion-dollar global phenomenon.	
2018		Porsche	Porsche 356; Porsche 917; Porsche 959; Porsche 918 Spyder; Porsche 911R; Porsche 919 Hybrid	70 years since the first production Porsche	
2019		Aston Martin	Aston Martin DBR1	70 years since Aston Martin's first race at Goodwood, when W.G. Bingley finished 10th and 60 years since their 1–2 victory at Le Mans.	
2021		Lotus	(interactive QR code)	Celebrating "the peerless sporting and technical achievements of Lotus Cars", and Colin Chapman's philosophy of "add lightness"; the shape was to evoke the rooster tail air flow analysis of the Lotus Evija	
2022		BMW	BMW 3.0 CSL; BMW M1 Procar; BMW V12 LMR; BMW M3 GT2; BMW M Hybrid V8	Celebration of 50 years of BMW M.	
2023		Porsche	Porsche 356; Porsche 804; Porsche 962; Porsche 911 Sport Classic; Porsche 911 Carrera S Porsche 963	75 years of Porsche sportscars	
2024		MG	MG MGB; MG Cyberster	100 years of MG	
2025		Gordon Murray	Gordon Murray Automotive T.50; Brabham BT52	Celebration of automobile designer Gordon Murray "with the greatest hits of his 60-year career in car design."	
2026		Singer Vehicle Design	Porsche 911 Classic; Porsche 911 Classic Turbo; Porsche 911 DLS	Celebration of Singer Vehicle Design.	

== Appearances in media ==
A Goodwood Festival of Speed event is available in Gran Turismo 6 with both the 2014 and 2015 central displays shown, and the nearby Goodwood Motor Circuit track is available in Gran Turismo Sport and Gran Turismo 7. ITV gives live coverage throughout the weekend and Sky Sports simulcast the Sunday show. As of 2019 it is also streamed on YouTube.

== Hill Climb Shootout Winners ==
The Hill Climb Shootout or The Sunday Shootout, is an event during the Goodwood Festival of Speed in which a selection of drivers with the fastest Hillclimb times of the weekend compete to get to the finish line the fastest.

Number	Year	Driver	Car	Fastest Time
1	1993	(United Kingdom) Willie Green	Surtees-Cosworth TS20	0:56.30
2	1994	(United Kingdom) Martin Brundle	McLaren-Peugeot MP4/9	0:47.80
3	1995	(United Kingdom) Jonathan Palmer	Williams-Ford Cosworth FW08B	0:46.06
4	1996	(United Kingdom) Jonathan Palmer	Williams-Ford Cosworth FW07B	0:45.00
5	1997	(Germany) Nick Heidfeld	McLaren-Mercedes MP4/11B	0:47.30
6	1998	(Germany) Nick Heidfeld	McLaren-Mercedes MP4/12	0:48.30
7	1999	(Germany) Nick Heidfeld	McLaren-Mercedes MP4/13	0:41.60
8	2000	(United Kingdom) Martin Stretton	Tyrrell-Ford Cosworth P34	0:45.05
9	2001	(United Kingdom) David Franklin	Ferrari 712 Can Am	0:48.26
10	2002	(New Zealand) Rod Millen	Toyota Celica Pikes Peak	0:47.40
11	2003	(United Kingdom) Graeme Wight, Jr.	Gould-Cosworth GR51	0:42.90
12	2004	(United Kingdom) Justin Law	Jaguar XJR-12	0:49.26
13	2005	(United Kingdom) Justin Law	Jaguar XJR-12	0:47.96
14	2006	(United Kingdom) Richard Lyons	Nissan 350Z GT500	0:49.51
15	2007	(United Kingdom) Anthony Reid	Nissan 350Z GT500	0:53.78
16	2008	(United Kingdom) Justin Law	Jaguar XJR8/9	0:44.19
17	2009	(United Kingdom) Justin Law	Jaguar XJR8/9	0:44.40
18	2010	(New Zealand) Roger Wills	Williams-Ford Cosworth FW05	0:47.15
19	2011	(United Kingdom) Dan Collins	Lotus-Ford Cosworth 88	0:48.52
20	2012	(United Kingdom) Anthony Reid	Chevron-Nissan GR8 GT3	0:46.46
21	2013	(United Kingdom) Justin Law	Jaguar XJR8/9	0:45.95
22	2014	(France) Sébastien Loeb	Peugeot 208 T16 Pikes Peak	0:44.60
23	2015	(United Kingdom) Olly Clark	Subaru Impreza "Gobstopper II"	0:44.91
24	2016	(United Kingdom) Olly Clark	Subaru Impreza "Gobstopper II"	0:46.23
25	2017	(United Kingdom) Justin Law	Jaguar XJR-12D	0:46.13
26	2018	(France) Romain Dumas	Volkswagen I.D. R	0:43.86
27	2019	(France) Romain Dumas	Volkswagen I.D. R	0:42.32
28	2021	(United Kingdom) Rob Bell	McLaren 720S GT3X	0:45.01
29	2022	(United Kingdom) Max Chilton	McMurtry Spéirling	0:39.08
30	2023	(Germany) Marvin Kirchhöfer	McLaren Solus GT	0:45.34
31	2024	(France) Romain Dumas	Ford SuperVan 4.2 Electric	0:43.98
32	2025	(France) Romain Dumas	Ford F-150 Lightning SuperTruck	0:43.22
33	2026	(France) Romain Dumas	Ford Super Mustang Mach-E	0:41.97

== Track records ==
Category	Time	Driver	Vehicle	Year
Hillclimb: 1.86 km
All-Time	0:39.08	(United Kingdom) Max Chilton	McMurtry Spéirling	2022
PPIHC Unlimited	0:39.90	(France) Romain Dumas	Volkswagen I.D. R	2019
Formula One	0:41.60	(Germany) Nick Heidfeld	McLaren-Mercedes MP4/13	1999
Formula E	0:42.46	(United Kingdom) Dan Ticktum	Formula E Gen4	2026
Group C	0:44.19	(United Kingdom) Justin Law	Jaguar XJR8/9	2008
Formula Two	0:45.64	(United Kingdom) Ben Mitchell	March-BMW 782	2022
CART	0:46.22	(United States) Jeremy Smith	Penske-Chevrolet PC22	2017
Group 7	0:46.30	(United Kingdom) Alex Summers	Shadow DN4	2026
WRC	0:46.31	(Sweden) Johan Kristoffersson	Volkswagen Polo WRX	2026
GT3	0:46.46	(United Kingdom) Anthony Reid	Chevron-Nissan GR8 GT3	2012
Porsche Carrera Cup	0:46.74	(United Kingdom) James Wallis	Porsche 911 GT3 Cup	2025
Group R5	0:47.32	(France) Grégory Guilvert	Peugeot 208 T16	2013
LMP900	0:47.72	(United Kingdom) James Cottingham	Dallara SP1 LMP	2015
Formula 5000	0:47.86	(United Kingdom) Michael Lyons	Lola-Chevrolet T400	2018
NASCAR Trucks	0:48.25	(United States) Mike Skinner	Toyota Tundra	2018
Formula Three	0:48.31	(United Kingdom) Billy Monger	Carlin F3	2018
Group A	0:48.91	(United Kingdom) Jake Hill	Nissan Skyline GTR R32 Group A	2024
GT1	0:49.07	(Germany) Michael Krumm	Nissan GT-R GT1	2012
Supercar	0:47.14	(Sweden) Markus Lundh	Koenigsegg Sadair's Spear	2025
GT500	0:49.51	(United Kingdom) Richard Lyons	Nissan 350Z GT500	2006
Ferrari Challenge	0:49.88	(United Kingdom) Andrew Morrow	Ferrari 488 Challenge	2023
Group 6	0:50.08	(United Kingdom) David Franklin	Ferrari 312 P	2015
LM GTE	0:50.35	(Germany) Timo Bernhard	Porsche 911 RSR-19	2022
Class 1	0:50.82	(United Kingdom) Ricky Collard	BMW M4 DTM	2018
Group B	0:50.98	(United Kingdom) Pat Doran	Ford RS200 Evo 2	2017
Stock car racing	0:51.39	(United States) Ed Berrier	Chevrolet Camaro	2022
GT2	0:51.45	(Germany) Olaf Manthey	Porsche 911 GT2 RS Clubsport 25	2023
NGTC	0:52.58	(United Kingdom) Andrew Jordan	BMW 125i M Sport	2018
Group Rally1	0:52.72	(Finland) Esapekka Lappi	Hyundai i20 N Rally1 Hybrid	2023
TCR	0:53.11	(United Kingdom) Lewis Kent	Hyundai Veloster N TCR	2022
Group 5	0:53.18	(United Kingdom) Andrew Willis	Matra-Simca MS670	2011
GT4	0:53.56	(United States) Billy Johnson	Ford Mustang GT4	2017
Group R3	1:00.69	(United Kingdom) Martin McCormack	Citroën DS3 R3	2011
Grand Prix	1:00.97	(Iran) Julian Majzub	Bugatti Type 35B	2026
Autonomous	1:06.38	(Italy) (United States) PoliMOVE	IAC-AV 24	2024
Forest Rally Stage 2.5 km
