= Volkswagen I.D. R =

Electric race car

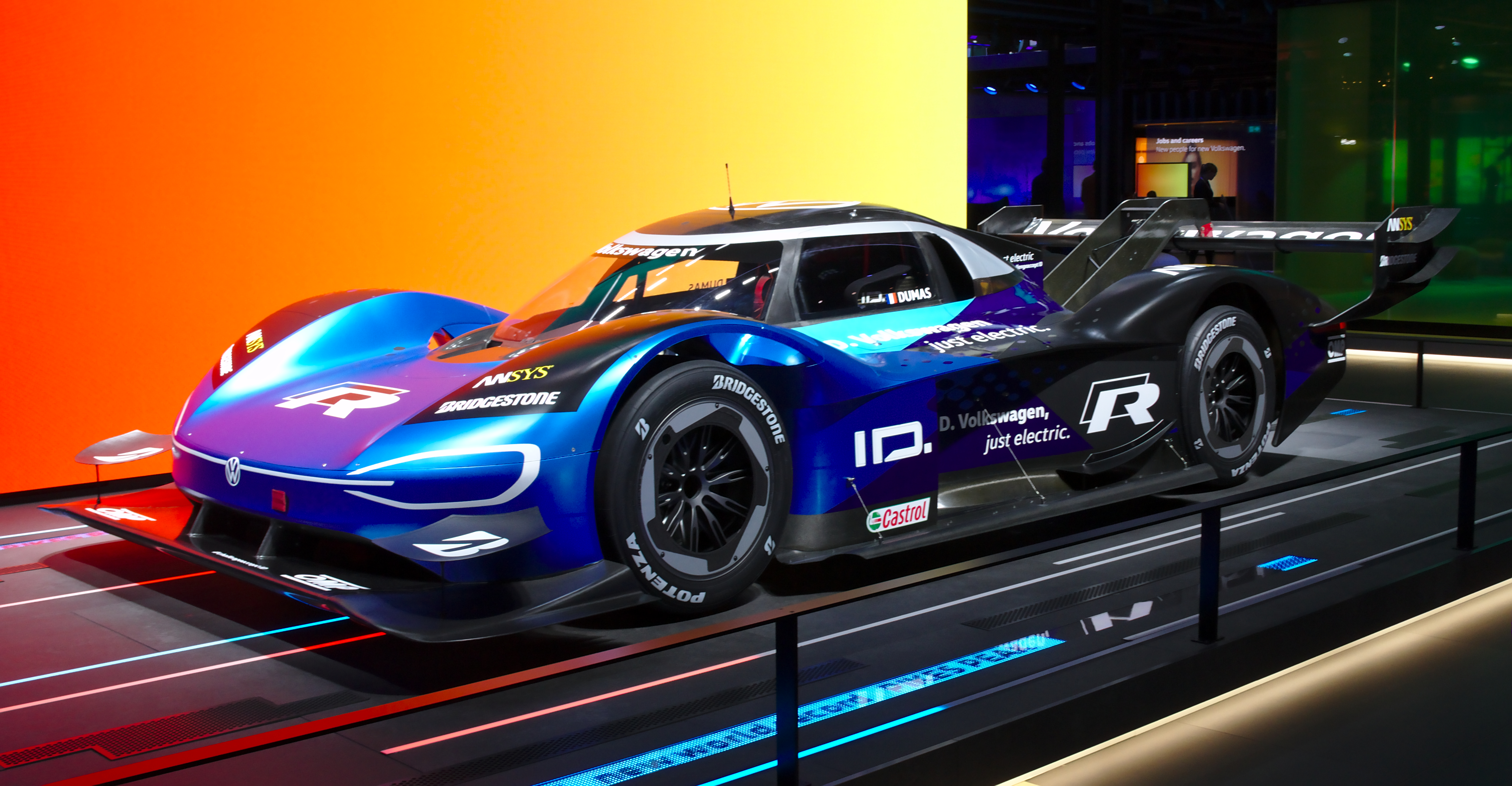
- Constructor: Volkswagen Motorsport

Technical specifications
- Chassis: Safety/crash structure at front, carbon monocoque with steel roll cage
- Suspension: Double wishbone
- Length: 5,219 mm (205.5 in)
- Width: 2,350 mm (92.5 in)
- Height: 979 mm (38.5 in)
- Axle track: 1,600 mm (63.0 in)
- Wheelbase: 2,850 mm (112.2 in)
- Electric motor: Dual motor 1 per axle permanent four-wheel drive with active torque distribution powered by ID.
- Battery: Lithium-ion
- Power: 500 kW (680 PS; 671 hp), 650 N⋅m (479 ft⋅lb) torque
- Weight: <1,100 kg (2,400 lb) incl. driver
- Brakes: Carbon fibre
- Tyres: Bridgestone Potenza 330-40/18; Michelin Pilot Sport GT "SLICK" 31/71-18 S9M (Volkswagen I.D. R Pikes Peak)

Competition history

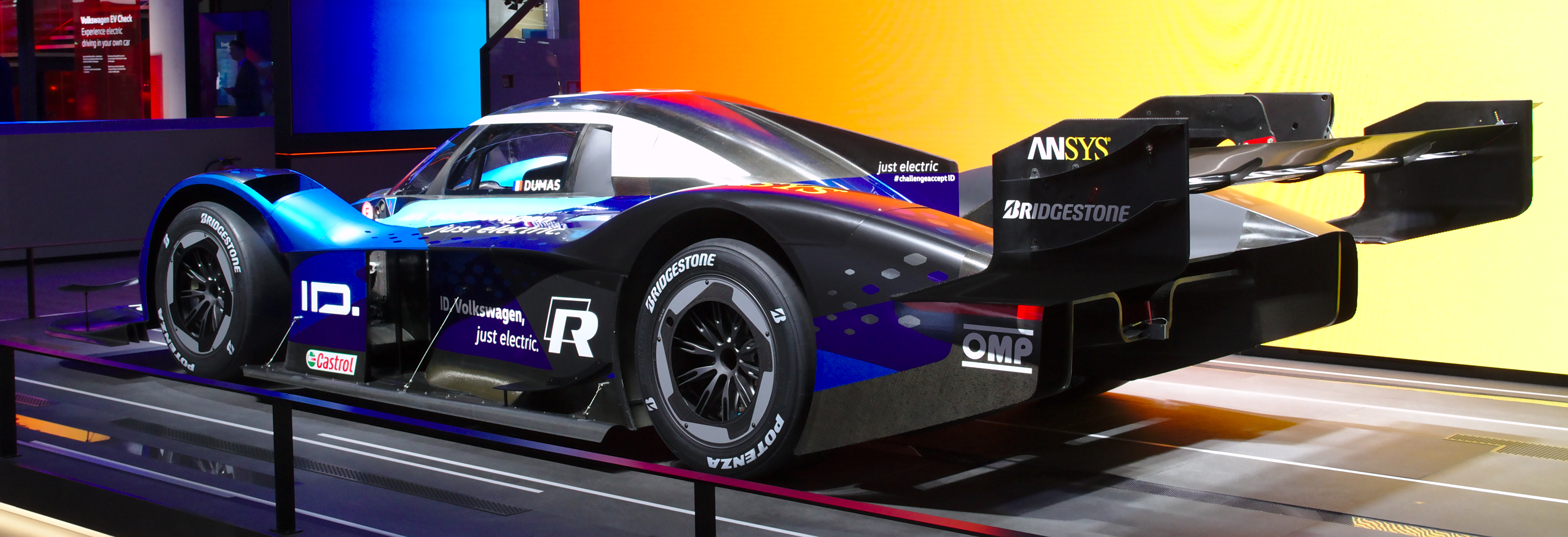
Volkswagen I.D. R rear view

The Volkswagen I.D. R also known as Volkswagen I.D. R Pikes Peak, is a prototype fully electric vehicle designed as part of Volkswagen's I.D. Project, and included within Volkswagen's R series of cars designed specifically for competing in motorsport events. It is the first electric racing car designed by Volkswagen.

== History ==
Following the Volkswagen emissions scandal in 2015, the company pulled out of major motorsport events such as the World Rally Championship (which the Polo R had won every year from 2013 to 2016), the Dakar Rally (3 straight wins 2009 to 2011, plus 2024) and the 24 Hours of Le Mans (from 2000 to 2017 all wins but in 2009, with its Audi, Bentley and Porsche brands).

The Volkswagen I.D. R made its competition debut at the Pikes Peak International Hill climb in Colorado Springs, Colorado on 24 June 2018. It was driven by Romain Dumas, and the team set a target of beating the existing electric car record of 8:57.118 minutes, set in 2016 by Rhys Millen with the Drive eO PP100. The I.D. R became the first car to complete the hill climb in under eight minutes (7:57.148), breaking the outright record set by Sébastien Loeb and the Peugeot 208 T16 Pikes Peak. The average speed during the run was 150.9 km/h (93.8 mph), and 218 km/h (135 mph) through the speed trap.

In 2018 the Dewar Trophy was awarded to Integral Powertrain (the provider of the motors used by Volkswagen) for their electric motors and drivers. Previous winners include Keith Duckworth for the Cosworth DFV engine and Mercedes AMG High Performance Powertrains for their Formula 1 hybrid powertrain.

On 3 June 2019 the ID.R used 24.7 kWh to break the electric vehicle lap record on the Nürburgring with a time of 6:05.336, cornering at up to 3.49 g. The record time was previously held by the NIO EP9 driven by Peter Dumbreck. Again driven by Dumas, the ID. R reached speeds of 273 km/h (170 mph), for an average of 205.3 km/h (127.6 mph). In 2019, the I.D. R set a new record for the Goodwood Festival of Speed Hillclimb clocking in at 39.90, also by Dumas.

On 2 September 2019, Dumas set a benchmark with the Volkswagen ID.R on the 10,906 m (35,781 ft) Shan Big Gate Road on Tianmen Mountain of 7:38.585.

In February 2020, Volkswagen confirmed that a second version of the I.D. R would be built. Named the I.D. R Evo, this version of the car is expected to continue to make record attempts at various tracks and courses around the world, potentially revisiting some benchmarks set by the original I.D. R car.

== Track times set ==
Year	Venue/Event	Driver	Time
2018	Pikes Peak International Hill Climb	Romain Dumas	7:57.148
2019	Nürburgring Nordschleife	Romain Dumas	6:05.336
2019	Goodwood Festival of Speed Hillclimb	Romain Dumas	39.90
2019	Tianmen Mountain	Romain Dumas	7:38.585
2020	Bilster Berg	Dieter Depping	1:24.206

== Technical specifications ==
The Volkswagen I.D. R features two electric motors, located at each axle, allowing for a combined 507 kW (689 PS; 680 hp) and 649 N⋅m (479 lb⋅ft) of torque. The I.D. R weighs under 1,100 kg (2,500 lb) and has a 0 to 60 mph (97 km/h) time of 2.25 seconds. It has a single 45-kWh battery. The Chassis of the car was co-developed by Norma, French sports prototype and hillclimb specialist.

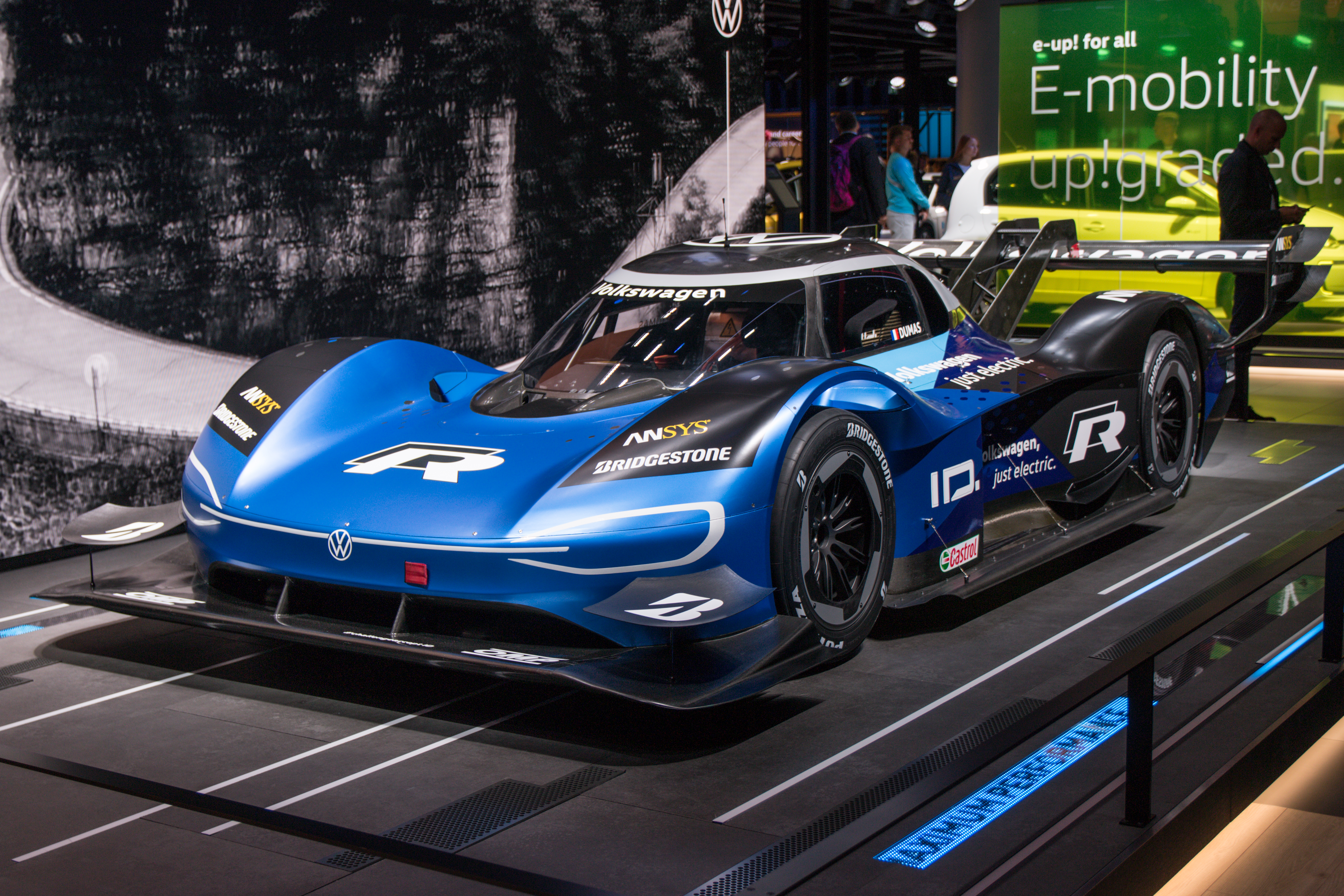
The car at IAA 2019

== In media ==
=== Television ===
The I.D. R appeared in the fifth episode of season 28 of Top Gear, with host Chris Harris pitting it against a McLaren 720S.

=== Video games ===
The I.D. R made its video game debut as paid downloadable content for V-Rally 4.

RaceRoom Racing Experience partnered with Volkswagen to feature the I.D. R in a time attack challenge on the Nürburgring Nordschleife; the competition ran from 24 April to 24 October 2019. It would later be featured in the title's 21 December 2020 content update.

Forza Horizon 4 saw the I.D. R join its vehicle roster as part of the Series 14 update.

The I.D. R are also appears in Real Racing 3 and Gran Turismo 7, both games depict a version that was used during the Nürburgring time attack challenge.

== See also ==
- McMurtry Spéirling, an electric prototype car manufactured by McMurtry Automotive.
