= 2015 Goodwood Festival of Speed =

The 2015 Goodwood Festival of Speed was held from 26 to 28 June.

== Report ==
The manufacturer celebrated at the Goodwood in 2015 was Mazda. Their Le Mans winning 787B was on display. An elite group of racers, celebrities and car enthusiasts, past and present, were present at this year's edition, including Sir Stirling Moss on the sixtieth anniversary of his win at the 1955 Mille Miglia. His #722 Mercedes-Benz 300 SLR which won the Italian endurance race six decades ago was celebrated at this year's Goodwood. One of the most important special guests in 2015 was the nine-times World Motorcycle champion Valentino Rossi, who flew here on Sunday from Assen, where he had won the Dutch TT yesterday and was given a standing ovation. Other guests included the WRC Rally Argentina winner, Kris Meeke, who demonstrated his victorious Citroën DS3 WRC. We also saw Jean Ragnotti and his 1985 Tour de Corse-winning Renault 5 Maxi Turbo. The 2001 Ford Focus WRC of Colin McRae was also featured at the hands of Steve Rockingham. And Scuderia Ferrari driver Kimi Räikkönen got into the 2010 Ferrari F10, formerly raced by his ex-teammate Felipe Massa.

Olly Clark, in his Subaru Impreza Gobstopper also won the Hillclimb, defeating French Andros Trophy champion Jean-Philippe Dayraut and Kiwi five-time Pikes Peak Hill Climb champion Rod Millen, and it was the first time the top three posted times of under 45 seconds in the same year.

It was Patrick Friesacher's Toyota Camry NASCAR that also attracted the crowd's attention as the Camry caught fire whilst doing a burnout. The century-old Fiat S76 Record "The Beast of Turin", unofficially the fastest car in the world in 1911, was restored by Duncan Pittaway for this event, and driven for the first time in more than one hundred years.

== Cars ==
- Jean Ragnotti's Renault 5 Maxi Turbo 1985
- Colin McRae's Ford Focus WRC 2001 (driven by Steve Rockingham)
- Fiat S76 Record 1911 (driven by Duncan Pittaway)
- Volker Weidler, Johnny Herbert and Bertrand Gachot's Mazda 787B 1991 (driven by Valentino Rossi)
- Patrick Friesacher's Toyota Camry NASCAR 2015
- Stirling Moss's Mercedes-Benz 300 SLR 1955
- Richard Petty's Plymouth Superbird 1970
- Felipe Massa's Ferrari F10 2010 (driven by Kimi Räikkönen)
- BJ Baldwin's Trophy Truck 2015
- Kris Meeke's Citroën DS3 WRC 2015
- Ayrton Senna's McLaren MP4/4 1988 (driven by Bruno Senna)
- Nissan Juke RS Nismo 2015 (driven by Terry Grant)

== Results ==
=== Hillclimb Shootout ===
Competitors set the following times up the Goodwood Hillclimb.

| Pos. | Goodwood # | Car # | Driver | Car | Time/Retired |
|---|---|---|---|---|---|
| 1 | 81 | | Olly Clark | Subaru Impreza 'Gobstopper II' | 44.91 |
| 2 | 73 | 3 | Jean-Phillipe Dayraut | Mitjet Mini Pikes Peak | 45.51 |
| 3 | 82 | | Rod Millen | Toyota Celica Pikes Peak | 45.88 |
| 4 | 240 | 47 | Jeremy Smith | March-Cosworth 2-4-0 | 47.05 |
| 5 | 308 | 24 | Michael Lyons | Hesketh-Cosworth 308E | 47.17 |
| 6 | 771 | 31 | James Littlejohn | LEC-Cosworth CRP1 | 47.19 |
| 7 | 772 | 31 | Oliver Hancock | LEC-Cosworth CRP1 | 47.26 |
| 8 | 143 | 23 | Alex Buncombe | Nissan GT-R NISMO GT3 | 47.37 |
| 9 | 140 | 6 | James Cottingham | Dallara SP1 LMP | 47.72 |
| 10 | 405 | 1 | Enda Garvey | Peugeot 405 T16 GR | 49.27 |
| 11 | 8 | | Andy Newall | McLaren-Chevrolet M8F | 49.78 |
| 12 | 69 | | David Franklin | Ferrari 312P | 50.08 |
| 13 | 997 | | Olaf Manthey | | 51.66 |
| 14 | 165 | | Andy Robinson | | 51.94 |
