= Renault R27 =

Formula One racing car

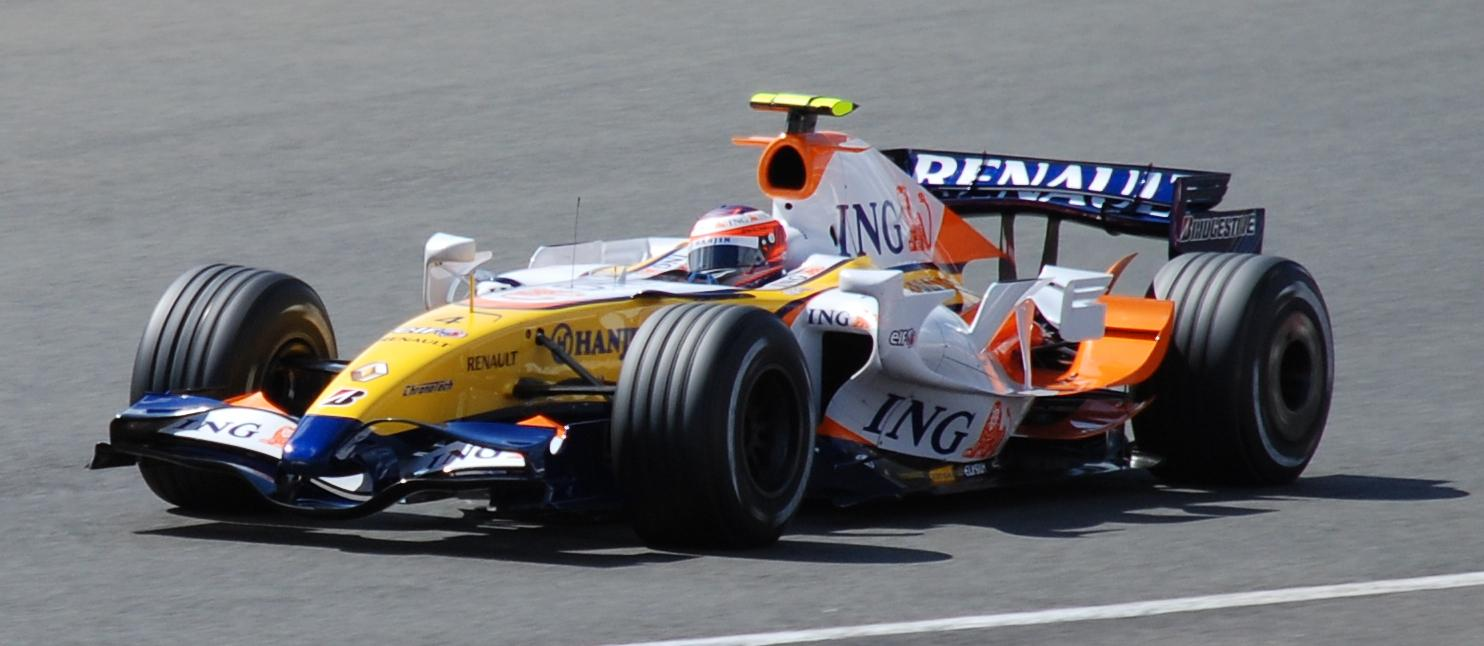
- Heikki Kovalainen driving the R27 at the 2007 British Grand Prix
- Category: Formula One
- Constructor: Renault
- Designers: Pat Symonds (Executive Engineer); Bob Bell (Technical Director); James Allison (Deputy Technical Director); Tim Densham (Chief Designer); Martin Tolliday (Deputy Chief Designer); Tad Czapski (Technology Director); Robin Tuluie (Head of R&D); Dino Toso (Head of Aerodynamics); David Wheater (Deputy Head of Aerodynamics); Rob White (Engine Technical Director); Axel Plasse (Project Manager - Engine)
- Predecessor: R26
- Successor: R28

Technical specifications
- Chassis: Carbon-fibre and aluminium honeycomb composite monocoque
- Suspension (front): Carbon-fibre double wishbone, with pushrod and rocker operated inboard torsion bar/damper units.
- Suspension (rear): Carbon-fibre double wishbone with gearbox-mounted vertical torsion bars and horizontal dampers.
- Length: 4,800 mm (189 in)
- Width: 1,800 mm (71 in)
- Height: 950 mm (37 in)
- Axle track: 1,450 mm (57 in) (front); 1,400 mm (55 in) (rear)
- Wheelbase: 3,100 mm (122 in)
- Engine: Mecachrome-built Renault RS27 2.4 L (146 cu in) V8 90° naturally aspirated, mid engined, longitudinally-mounted
- Transmission: Renault seven-speed + reverse instantaneous shift
- Power: >750 hp @ 19,000 rpm
- Weight: 605 kg (1,334 lb) with driver, camera and ballast
- Fuel: Elf Atmo 98.5 RON
- Lubricants: Elf Evolution 900 SXR
- Tyres: Bridgestone

Competition history
- Notable entrants: ING Renault F1 Team
- Notable drivers: 3. (Italy) Giancarlo Fisichella; 4. (Finland) Heikki Kovalainen
- Debut: 2007 Australian Grand Prix
- Last event: 2007 Brazilian Grand Prix
Races	Wins	Podiums	Poles	F/Laps
17	0	1	0	0
- Constructors' Championships: 0
- Drivers' Championships: 0

The Renault R27 is a Formula One racing car designed and produced by Renault for the 2007 Formula One season. The chassis was designed by Bob Bell, James Allison, Tim Densham and Dino Toso with Pat Symonds overseeing the design and production of the car as Executive Director of Engineering and Rob White leading the engine design. The car was driven by Giancarlo Fisichella and Heikki Kovalainen.

It made its first public outing on 16 January 2007, at Jerez circuit after completing a short first test at Silverstone the week before.

== Aerodynamics ==
The R27 is outwardly similar to the 2006 R26, with several aerodynamic modifications. The front wing design, for example, is very similar to the R26's. One unusual new feature is the placing of the rear view mirrors on the strakes on outer edge of the sidepod, following a concept introduced by Ferrari on their 2006 car (the 248 F1).

Despite the apparent similarities to its predecessor, the R27 did not emulate its results. The car proved to be relatively uncompetitive and the team slumped to fourth, generally being slower than Ferrari, McLaren, and BMW. The R27 failed to score any wins for the first time since 2002 and took only one podium, at the rain-soaked Japanese Grand Prix in the hands of rookie Heikki Kovalainen. In comparison, the R26 won on its debut and won the 2006 Constructors' and Drivers' championships. The team put the car's uncompetitive form down to an over-reliance on the team's wind tunnel which had shown incorrect readings for how the car would perform, aerodynamically, on the track. By the end of the year, the car was being out-paced by Renault-powered Red Bull, Williams, Scuderia Toro Rosso, Toyota and Honda. Many put this down to the team abandoning its development and focusing on the 2008 car.

=== Tyre adaptation and balance issues ===
Tyre manufacturer Michelin, with whom Renault had enjoyed back to back double championships in 2005 and 2006 had called time on its involvement in F1 at the end of the latter of those seasons, meaning Bridgestone would be the sole tyre supplier in the sport for 2007. ESPN suggested in a September 2007 article that Renault's struggle in adapting to using Bridgestone tyres having become used to using Michelin tyres was part of the reason for Renault's poor 2007, whilst Renault driver Giancarlo Fisichella suggested the car's biggest problem was the R27s' lack of front downforce.

== Gearbox ==
The new seven-speed Instantaneous GearChange (ICG) gearbox is Renault's first attempt at a seamless shift gearbox. It proved to be very reliable with Kovalainen making only one retirement all season, which was due to an accident in the Brazilian Grand Prix.

== Sponsorship and livery ==
The livery reflected the team's then-new title sponsor, the ING Group, and consisted of an assortment of colours including orange, white, yellow and dark blue. The colour scheme was not positively received by all Formula One fans, however. Kovalainen brought along his own personal sponsor, Mad-Croc.

An interim livery - dark blue and yellow - was used during early test sessions and at the car's official launch in Amsterdam on 24 January.

== Gallery ==
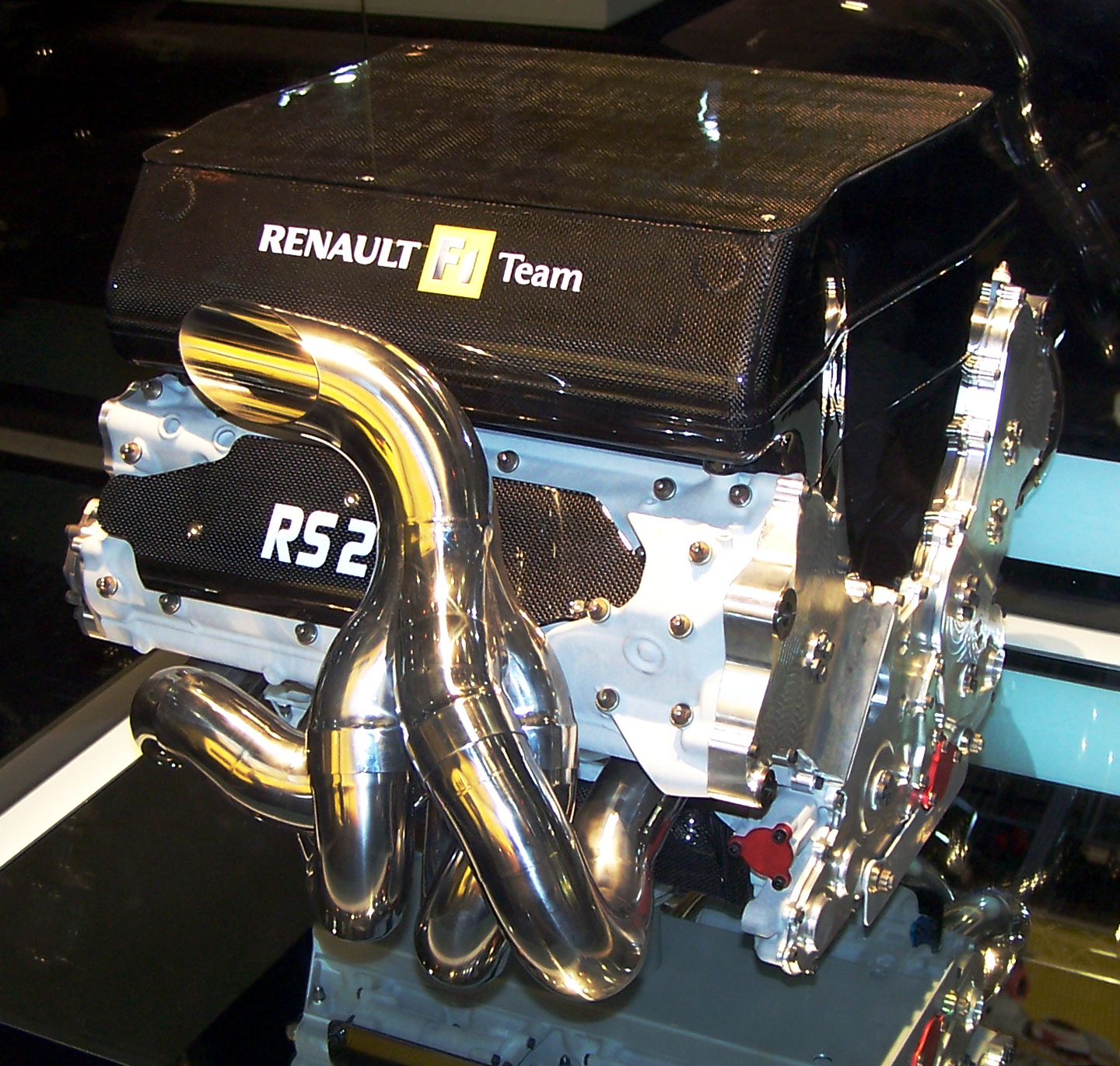
Renault RS27 engine.

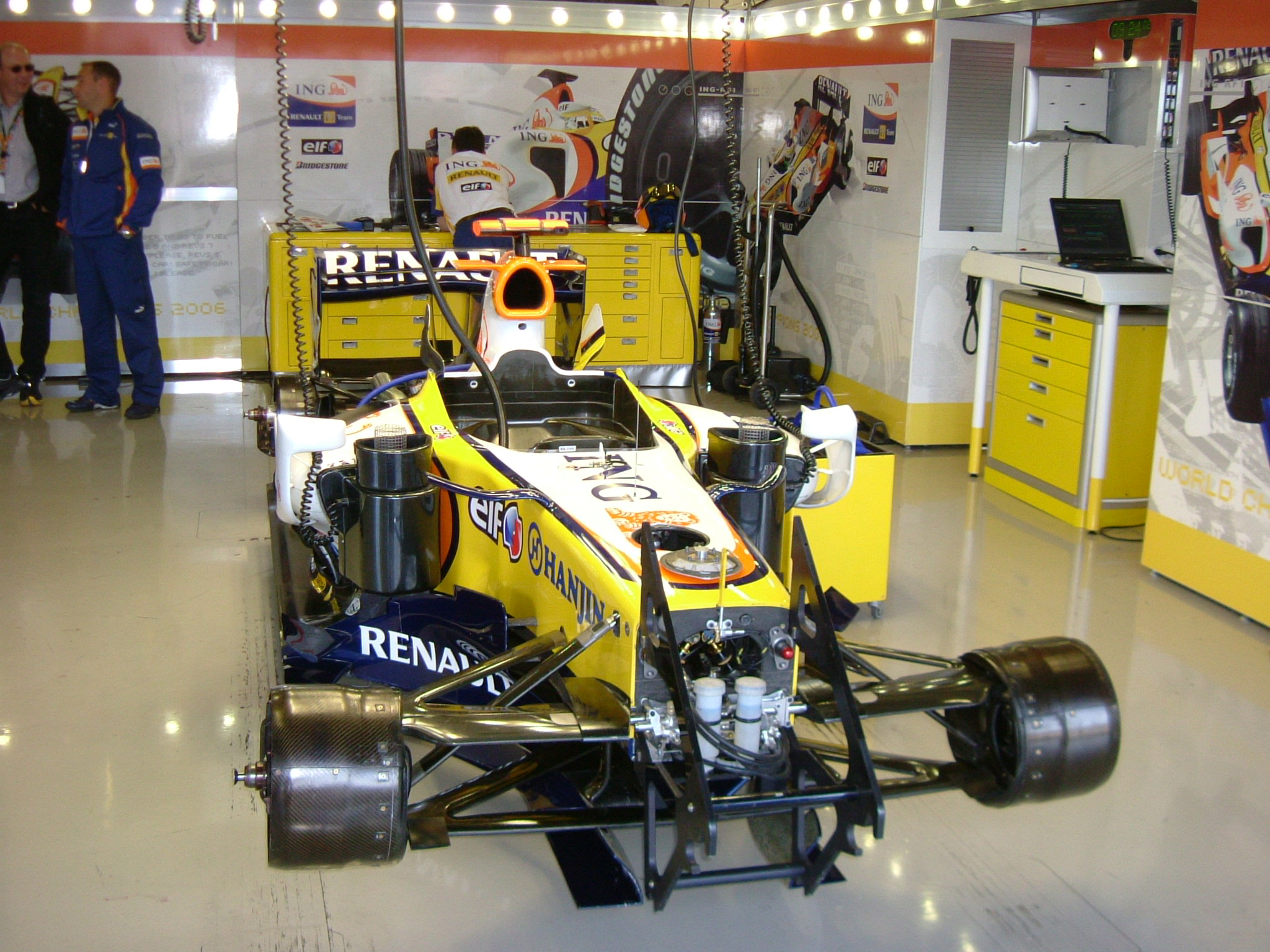
Pre-race preparations for the 2007 British Grand Prix.

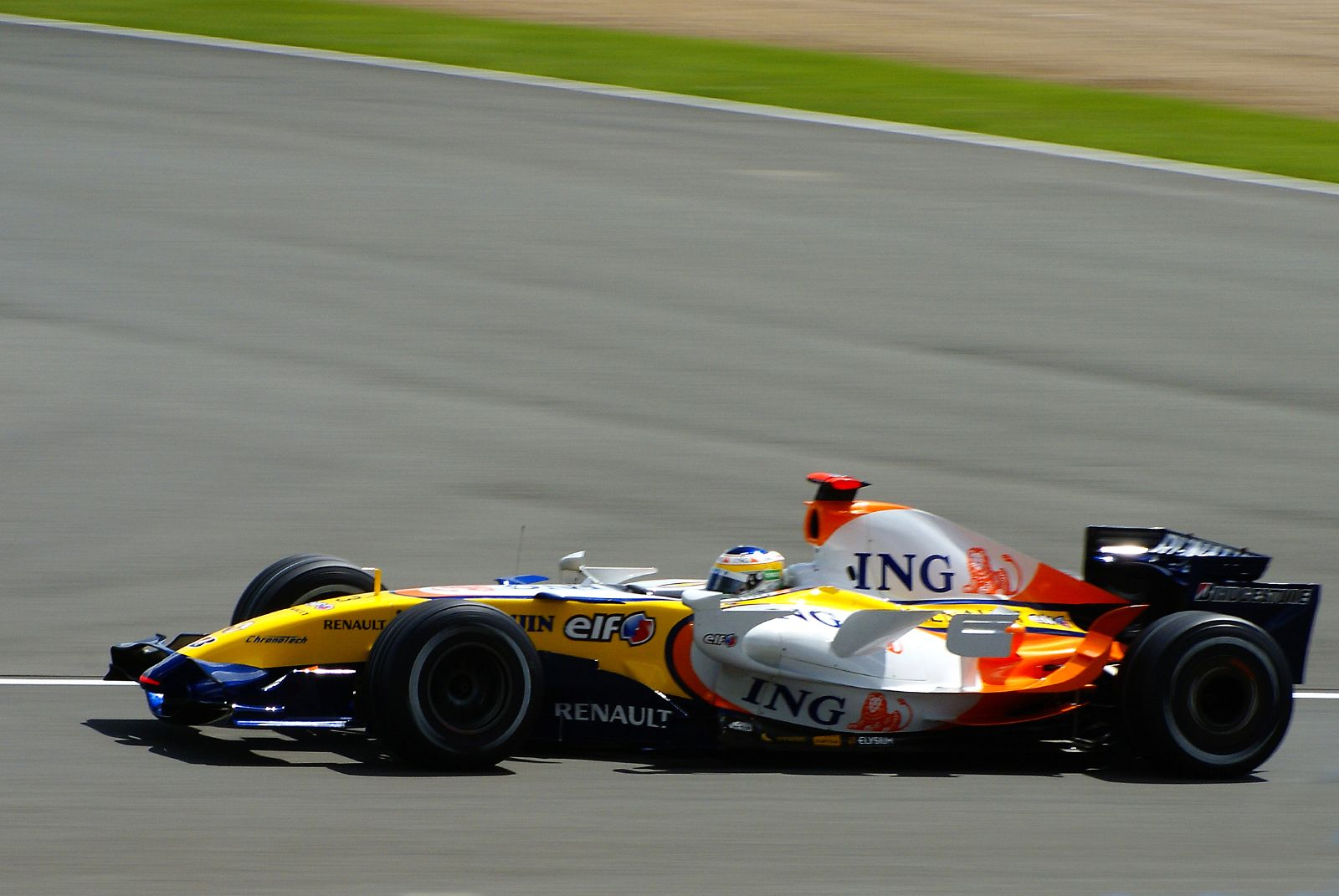
Fisichella driving the R27 at the British Grand Prix.

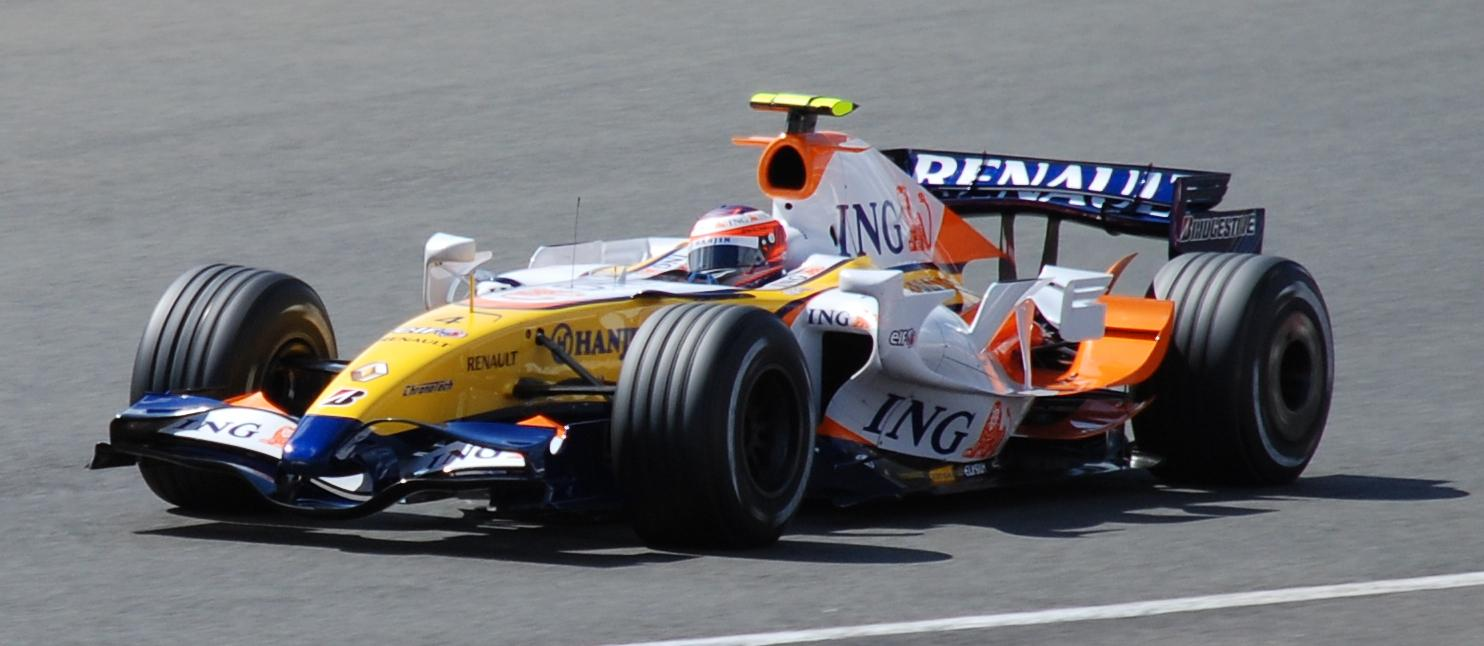
Heikki Kovalainen driving the R27 at the British Grand Prix.

== Complete Formula One results ==
(key) (results in bold indicate pole position)

Year	Team	Engine	Tyres	Drivers	1	2	3	4	5	6	7	8	9	10	11	12	13	14	15	16	17	Points	WCC
2007	Renault	Renault V8	**B**		AUS	MAL	BHR	ESP	MON	CAN	USA	FRA	GBR	EUR	HUN	TUR	ITA	BEL	JPN	CHN	BRA	**51**	**3rd**
2007	Renault	Renault V8	**B**	(Italy) Giancarlo Fisichella	5	6	8	9	4	DSQ	9	6	8	10	12	9	12	Ret	5	11	Ret	**51**	**3rd**
2007	Renault	Renault V8	**B**	(Finland) Heikki Kovalainen	10	8	9	7	13^{†}	4	5	15	7	8	8	6	7	8	2	9	Ret	**51**	**3rd**

== Notes ==
- "TECHNICAL SPECIFICATION RENAULT R27/RENAULT RS27 V8". All Formula One Info. Archived from the original on 27 June 2013.
