= Renault R28 =

Formula One racing car

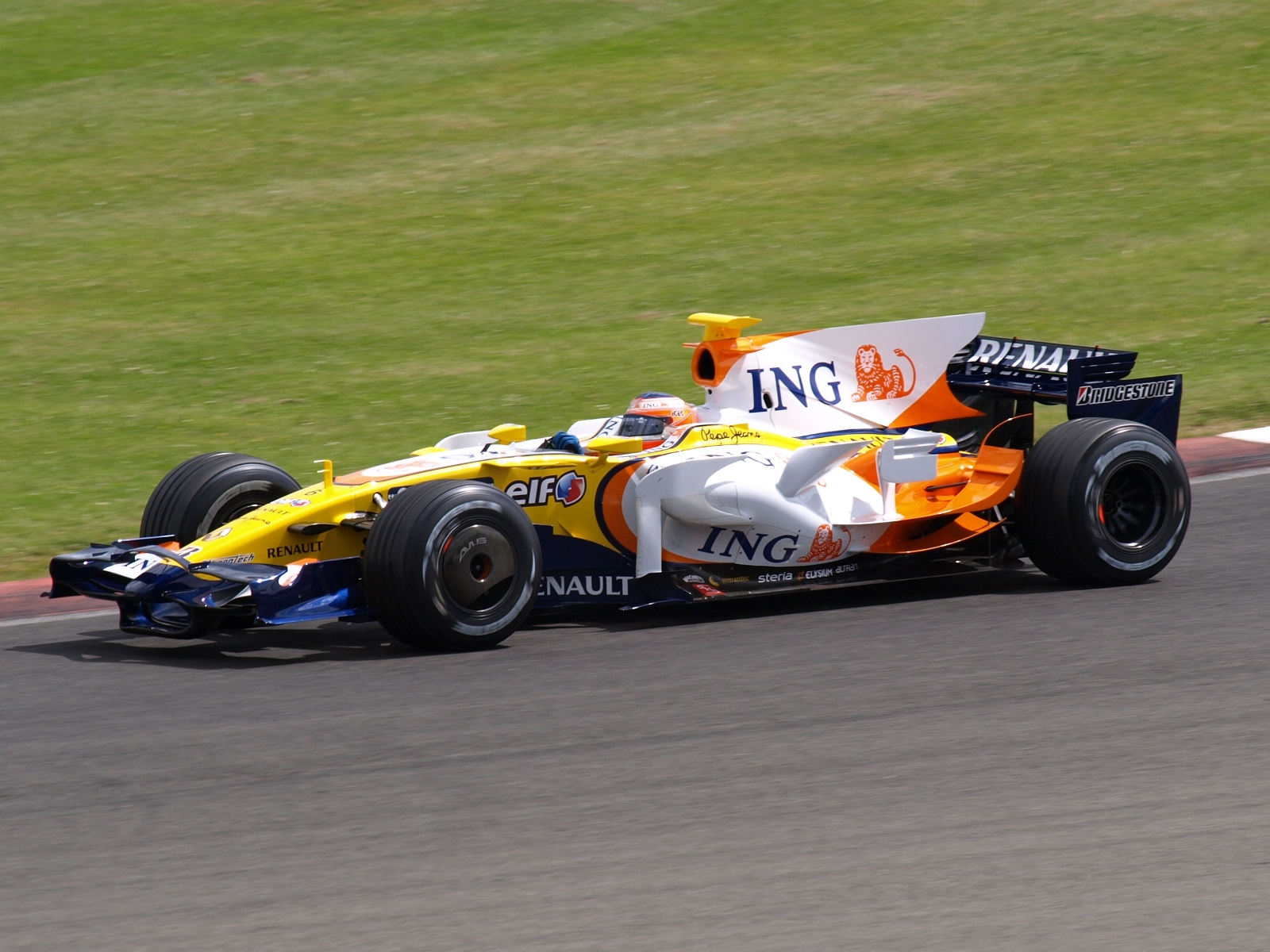
- Nelson Piquet Jr. testing the R28 at Silverstone Circuit
- Category: Formula One
- Constructor: Renault
- Designers: Pat Symonds (Executive Engineer); Bob Bell (Technical Director); James Allison (Deputy Technical Director); Tim Densham (Chief Designer); Martin Tolliday (Deputy Chief Designer); Tad Czapski (Technology Director); Robin Tuluie (Head of R&D); Dino Toso (Head of Aerodynamics); David Wheater (Deputy Head of Aerodynamics); Rob White (Engine Technical Director); Axel Plasse (Project Manager - Engine)
- Predecessor: R27
- Successor: R29

Technical specifications
- Chassis: Carbon-fibre and aluminium honeycomb composite monocoque, designed for maximum strength and stiffness with minimum weight
- Suspension (front): Carbon-fibre double wishbone, with pushrod and rocker operated inboard torsion bar/damper units, Zero-keel design for front suspension mounting in order to optimise front end aerodynamic performance.
- Suspension (rear): Carbon-fibre double wishbone with gearbox-mounted vertical torsion bars and horizontally mounted damper units mounted on the top of the gearbox casing.
- Engine: Renault RS27-2008 2400cc 90-degree V8, naturally aspirated, mid-engine, longitudinally mounted, 19,000 RPM Limited
- Transmission: Renault Seven-speed semi-automatic titanium gearbox with one reverse gear. "Quickshift" system in operation to maximise speed of gearshifts.
- Power: >750 hp @ 19,000 rpm
- Fuel: Elf
- Tyres: Bridgestone Potenza

Competition history
- Notable entrants: ING Renault F1 Team
- Notable drivers: 5. (Spain) Fernando Alonso; 6. (Brazil) Nelson Piquet Jr.
- Debut: 2008 Australian Grand Prix
- First win: 2008 Singapore Grand Prix
- Last win: 2008 Japanese Grand Prix
- Last event: 2008 Brazilian Grand Prix
Races	Wins	Podiums	Poles	F/Laps
18	2	4	0	0

The Renault R28 is a Formula One racing car, with which Renault F1 contested the 2008 Formula One season. The chassis was designed by Bob Bell, James Allison, Tim Densham and Dino Toso with Pat Symonds overseeing the design and production of the car as Executive Director of Engineering and Rob White leading the engine design. The car was driven by Fernando Alonso and Nelson Piquet Jr.

== Overview ==
The 2007 car, the R27, struggled following the switch from Michelin to Bridgestone tyres. Consequently, the weight distribution of the R28 was shifted forward to better suit the Bridgestone tyres.

In the front suspension, Renault’s unique V-keel system has been abandoned in favor of a new, keel-less design. To prevent excessive stress on the wishbones, the nose section of the monocoque has been positioned lower. The front wing features a distinctive shape with a central recess, and support pylons that extend horizontally from the nose to connect to the main plane. A McLaren style bridge element is mounted on top.

Regarding the sidepod assembly, the team did not adopt the trendy McLaren style "fence"; instead, they retained the design featuring separate bargeboards and "chimney" ducts. However, the bargeboards were reduced in size, and their integration with the rearview mirror was abandoned. The rearview mirror was relocated to the side of the cockpit, as seen on the R26. The rear section of the sidepods is more tightly tapered, which led to the addition of an F2007 style cooling vent at the rear of the engine cover.

== Launch ==
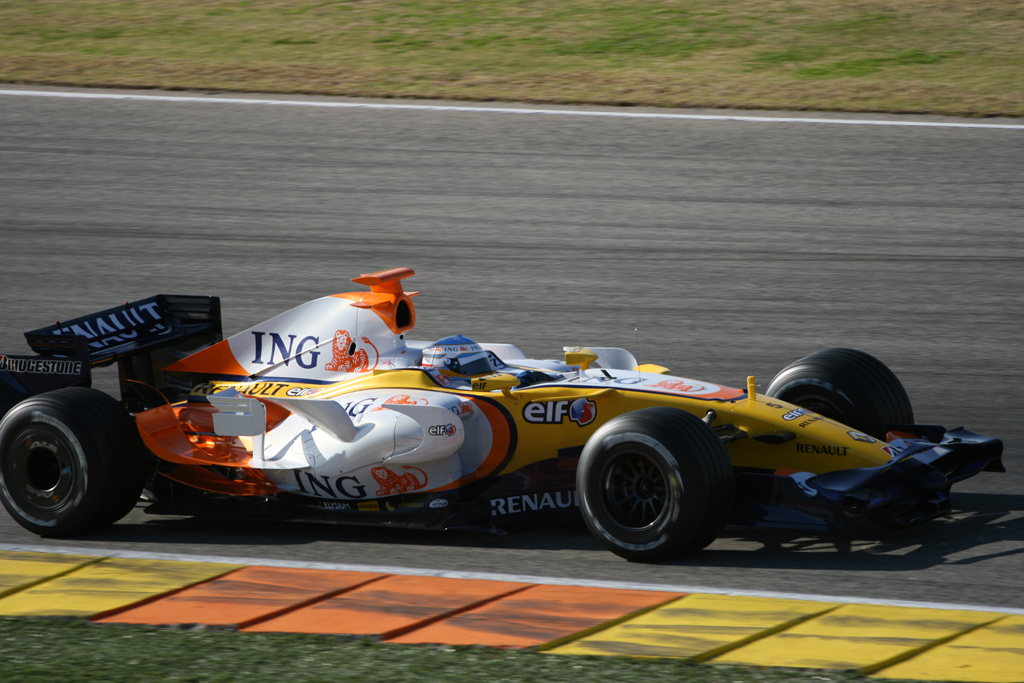
Fernando Alonso testing the R28 at Valencia on January 23, 2008.

Similarly to Honda, Renault arrived at Valencia with their contender a week before its official launch, giving the first laps of the R28 to Fernando Alonso on January 21, 2008. The car was officially launched on January 31, 2008 at Renault's communications headquarters in Boulogne-Billancourt, on the banks of the Seine in south-west Paris. Renault unveiled rookie Nelson Piquet Jr. as Alonso's team mate for the 2008 season, and confirmed Lucas di Grassi, Romain Grosjean and Sakon Yamamoto as their official test drivers.

== Sponsorship and livery ==
The car carried a similar livery and sponsorship to 2007: ING were still the title sponsor, but Pepe Jeans had now been added as a sponsor, along with returnee Spanish insurance firm Mutua Madrileña. Mutua Madrileña had been a sponsor of the McLaren-Mercedes team in 2007, but chose to follow Alonso when he left McLaren after only one year due to Alonso's personal sponsors.

== 2008 season ==
=== Testing ===
Renault made strong progress throughout the early 2008 testing schedule, with Alonso consistently at the top end of the timesheets. The Spaniard commented that the team were "able to keep improving our understanding of the Bridgestone tyres, and also the new way of setting up the car with no traction control or engine braking". The team made some improvements at a later test in Jerez, despite difficult windy weather conditions.

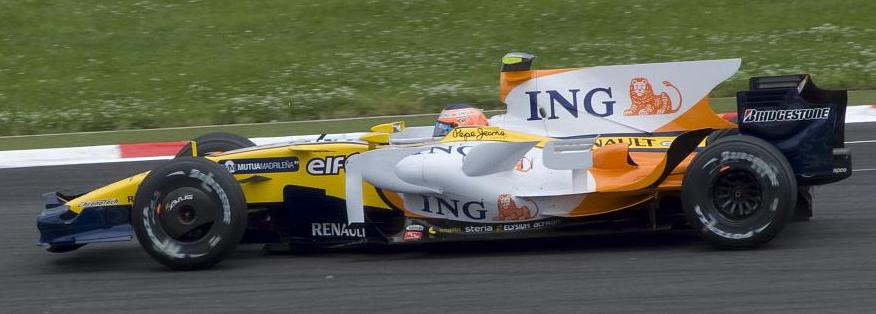
Nelson Piquet Jr. driving the R28 at the 2008 French Grand Prix. The engine cover Shark Fin, similar to that of the Red Bull RB4, was attached from the 2008 Spanish Grand Prix.

== Later uses ==
On April 9, 2009, during Renault's promotional tour in Dubai, Mohammed Ben Sulayem was invited to test drive the Renault R28 at the Dubai Autodrome. 100 meters after the start, he lost control of his car and crashed into the pit wall. The car was destroyed, but Ben Sulayem survived uninjured.

== Complete Formula One results ==
(key) (results in bold indicate pole position)

Year	Entrant	Engine	Tyres	Drivers	1	2	3	4	5	6	7	8	9	10	11	12	13	14	15	16	17	18	Points	WCC
2008	ING Renault F1	Renault V8	**B**		AUS	MAL	BHR	ESP	TUR	MON	CAN	FRA	GBR	GER	HUN	EUR	BEL	ITA	SIN	JPN	CHN	BRA	80	4th
2008	ING Renault F1	Renault V8	**B**	Fernando Alonso	4	8	10	Ret	6	10	Ret	8	6	11	4	Ret	4	4	1	1	4	2	80	4th
2008	ING Renault F1	Renault V8	**B**	Nelson Piquet Jr.	Ret	11	Ret	Ret	15	Ret	Ret	7	Ret	2	6	11	Ret	10	Ret	4	8	Ret	80	4th
