= Renault R29 =

2009 Formula One racing car

- Fernando Alonso driving the R29 at the Spanish Grand Prix
- Category: Formula One
- Constructor: Renault
- Designers: Pat Symonds (Executive Engineer); Bob Bell (Technical Director); James Allison (Deputy Technical Director); Tim Densham (Chief Designer); Martin Tolliday (Deputy Chief Designer); Tad Czapski (Technology Director); Robin Tuluie (Head of R&D); Dirk de Beer (Head of Aerodynamics); David Wheater (Deputy Head of Aerodynamics); Rob White (Engine Technical Director); Axel Plasse (Project Manager - Engine); Naoki Tokunaga (KERS Project Leader)
- Predecessor: Renault R28
- Successor: Renault R30

Technical specifications
- Chassis: Moulded carbon fibre and aluminium honeycomb composite monocoque, with engine incorporated as a fully stressed member.
- Suspension (front): Carbon fibre double wishbone, operating inboard torsion bar and damper units via a pushrod system.
- Suspension (rear): As front.
- Length: 4,800 mm (190 in)
- Width: 1,800 mm (71 in)
- Height: 950 mm (37 in)
- Axle track: Front: 1,450 mm (57 in); Rear: 1,400 mm (55 in)
- Engine: Renault RS27 2,400 cc (146.5 cu in) 90° V8 with KERS, limited to 18,000 RPM, naturally aspirated, mid-mounted.
- Transmission: Seven-speed semi-automatic carbon-titanium gearbox with reverse gear. "Quickshift" system.
- Power: >750 hp @ 18,000 rpm
- Fuel: Total
- Tyres: Bridgestone Potenza

Competition history
- Notable entrants: ING Renault F1 Team (Rounds 1-13); Renault F1 Team (Rounds 14-17)
- Notable drivers: 7. (Spain) Fernando Alonso; 8. (Brazil) Nelson Piquet Jr.; 8. (France) Romain Grosjean
- Debut: 2009 Australian Grand Prix
- Last event: 2009 Abu Dhabi Grand Prix
| Races | Wins | Podiums | Poles | F/Laps |
|---|---|---|---|---|
| 17 | 0 | 1 | 1 | 2 |

The Renault R29 is a Formula One racing car designed by the Renault F1 Team, with which they contested the 2009 Formula One World Championship. The chassis was designed by Bob Bell, James Allison, Tim Densham and Dirk de Beer with Pat Symonds overseeing the design and production of the car as Executive Director of Engineering and Rob White leading the engine design. The car was driven by Fernando Alonso, Nelson Piquet Jr. and Romain Grosjean.

== Launch ==
The R29 was launched on 19 January 2009 at the Algarve circuit in Portugal.

== Testing ==
Initial testing was conducted at the Portimao circuit along with rivals Williams, McLaren, Toyota and Toro Rosso from 19 January 2009 to 22 January 2009. Nelson Piquet Jr. was scheduled to drive for the first two days, followed by Fernando Alonso on the final two.

== Season review ==
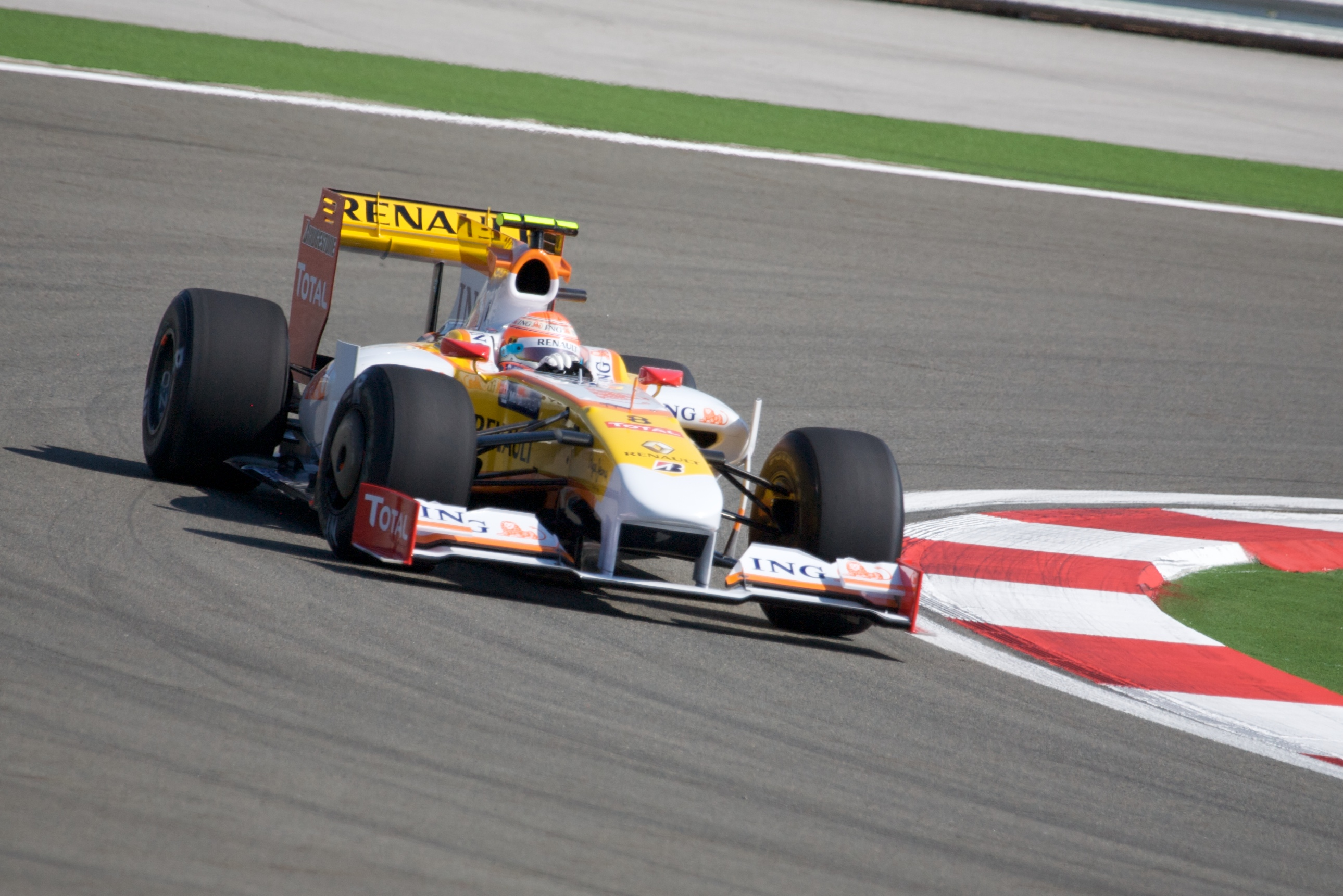
Piquet driving the R29 at the Turkish Grand Prix.

Coming off a resurgent second half of the previous year, the team expected to be fighting for both the drivers' and constructors' titles. Instead, the car proved to be disappointing. Fernando Alonso scored all of the team's 26 points. In the hands of either of Alonso's team mates, the car was often towards the back of the field with Nelson Piquet Jr. and Romain Grosjean often failing to reach Q2.

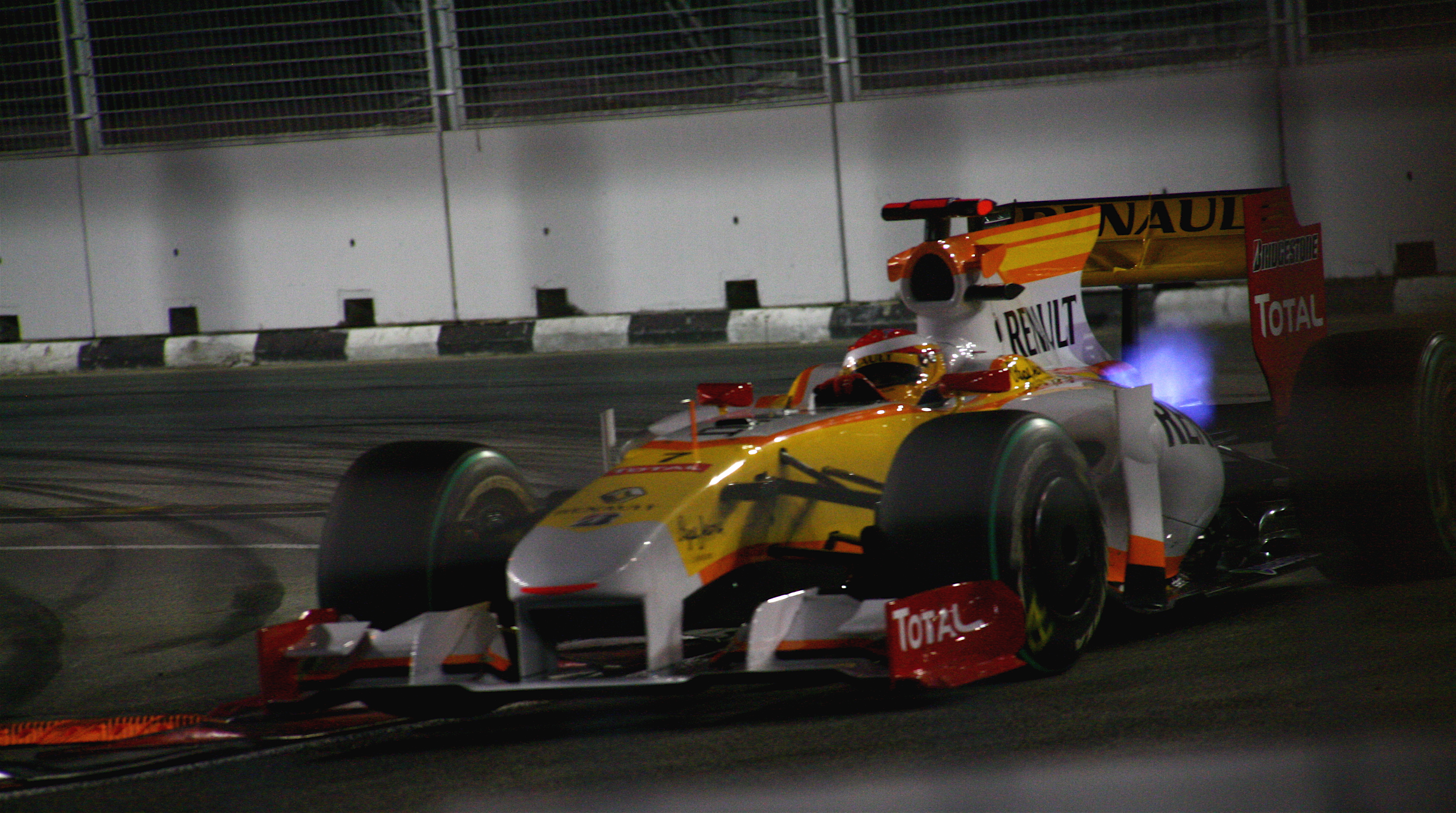
Alonso took the team's only podium finish of the season in Singapore.

Unlike many other 2009 cars that began the year uncompetitively, such as the McLaren MP4-24, the R29 showed no sign of improvement throughout the season, and arguably became less competitive over the course of the year, despite Alonso's third place in Singapore Grand Prix, which was Renault's only podium finish of the season.

== Sponsorship ==
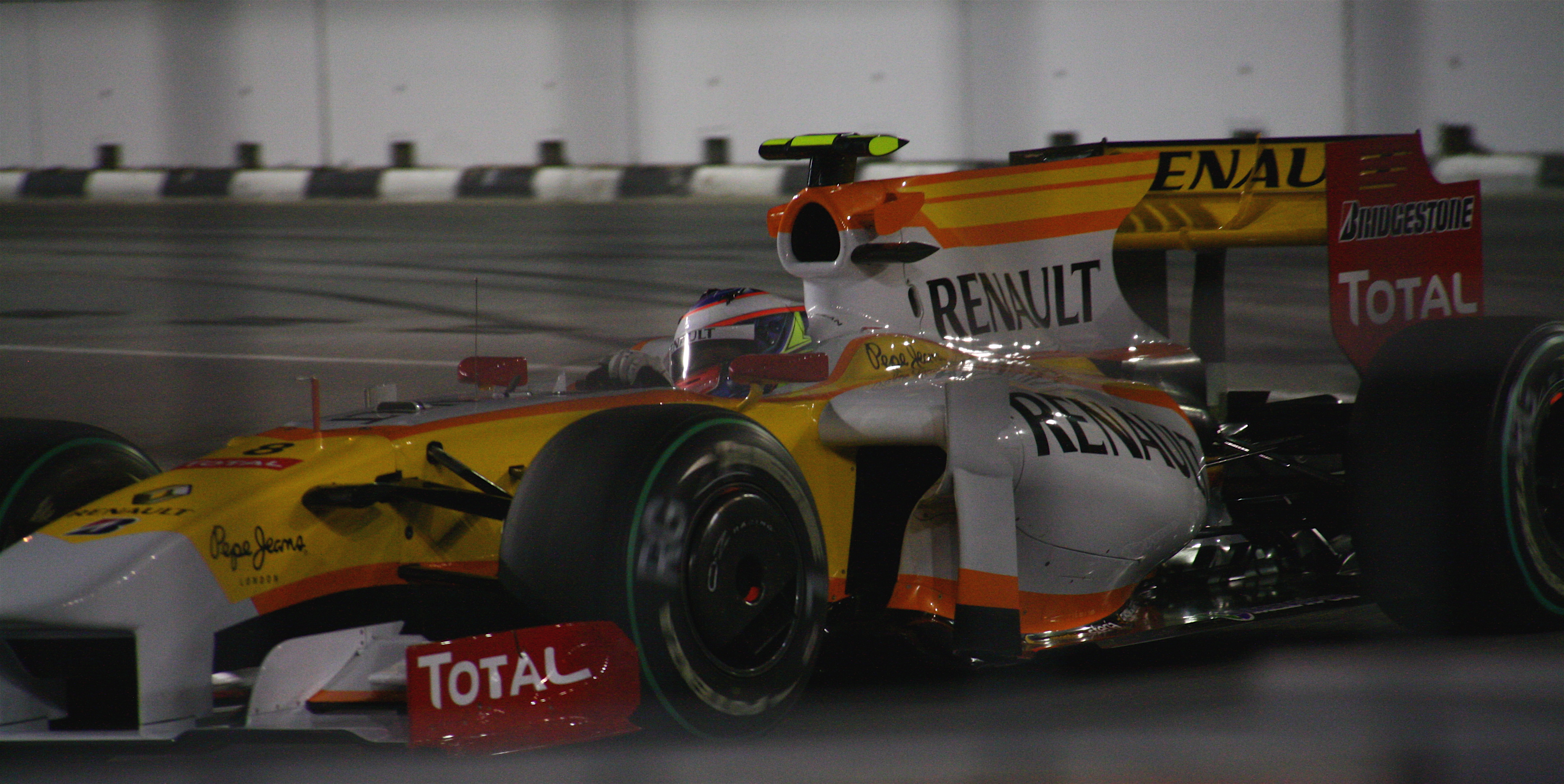
Grosjean driving the R29 with a revised livery after the departure of ING as shown in Singapore.

ING Group initially remained the team's primary sponsor, carrying over from 2008. However, in the wake of the "Crashgate", ING terminated their contract with immediate effect - the company had been due to end their sponsorship of the team after the season. Their logo on the car was simply replaced by the word Renault from the Singapore Grand Prix onwards. Despite this, the logo was still visible on the driver overalls and personnel uniform during the Singapore race, and from the next race in Japan, the team introduced a new uniform for the last three races of the season that removed both the logo and the orange accents from the design.

French oil company Elf Aquitaine was replaced as a team partner by Elf's parent company, Total, adding red accents to the car's livery There was still an Elf logo on the engine cover.

== Complete Formula One results ==
(key) (results in bold indicate pole position; results in italics indicate fastest lap)

| Year | Entrant | Engine | Tyres | Drivers | 1 | 2 | 3 | 4 | 5 | 6 | 7 | 8 | 9 | 10 | 11 | 12 | 13 | 14 | 15 | 16 | 17 | Points | WCC |
|---|---|---|---|---|---|---|---|---|---|---|---|---|---|---|---|---|---|---|---|---|---|---|---|
| 2009 | ING Renault F1 Team | Renault RS27 V8 | **B** | | AUS | MAL | CHN | BHR | ESP | MON | TUR | GBR | GER | HUN | EUR | BEL | ITA | SIN | JPN | BRA | ABU | 26 | 8th |
| 2009 | ING Renault F1 Team | Renault RS27 V8 | **B** | Fernando Alonso | 5 | 11 | 9 | 8 | 5 | 7 | 10 | 14 | 7 | **Ret** | 6 | Ret | 5 | 3 | 10 | Ret | 14 | 26 | 8th |
| 2009 | ING Renault F1 Team | Renault RS27 V8 | **B** | Nelson Piquet Jr. | Ret | 15 | 16 | 10 | 12 | Ret | 16 | 12 | 13 | 12 | | | | | | | | 26 | 8th |
| 2009 | ING Renault F1 Team | Renault RS27 V8 | **B** | Romain Grosjean | | | | | | | | | | | 15 | Ret | 15 | Ret | 16 | 13 | 18 | 26 | 8th |
