= Renault R24 =

Formula One racing car

Renault R24 Renault R24B
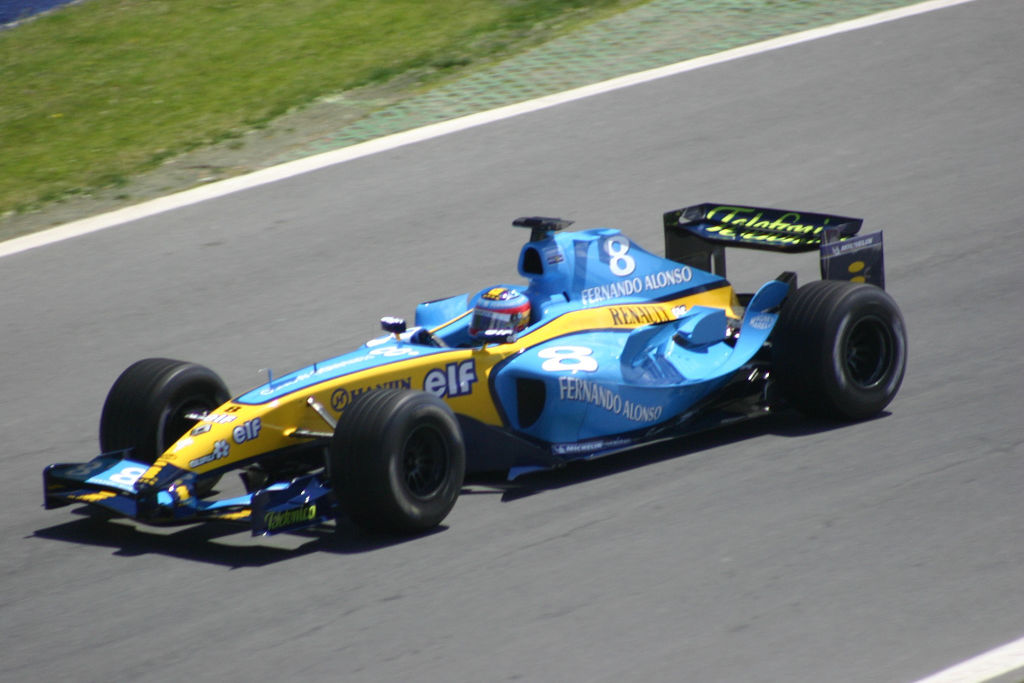
- Fernando Alonso driving the R24 at the 2004 Canadian Grand Prix
- Category: Formula One
- Constructor: Renault
- Designers: Pat Symonds (Executive Engineer); Mike Gascoyne (Technical Director); Bob Bell (Deputy Technical Director); Mark Smith (Chief Designer); Tad Czapski (Head of R&D); Dino Toso (Head of Aerodynamics); Jon Tomlinson (Deputy Head of Aerodynamics); Bernard Dudot (Engine Technical Director); Léon Taillieu (Project Manager - Engine)
- Predecessor: R23
- Successor: R25

Technical specifications
- Chassis: Moulded carbon fibre and aluminium honeycomb composite monocoque
- Suspension (front): Carbon-fibre top and bottom wishbones operate an inboard titanium rocker via a pushrod system
- Suspension (rear): Titanium top and carbon-fibre bottom wishbones operating vertically-mounted torsion bars and horizontally-mounted damper units mounted on the top of the gearbox casing
- Engine: Renault RS24, mid-engined 3.0 litre V10 (72°)
- Transmission: Titanium longitudinal, semi-automatic sequential paddle-shift, 6-speed + 1 reverse
- Power: 880-900 hp @ 19,000 rpm
- Fuel: Elf
- Tyres: Michelin

Competition history
- Notable entrants: Mild Seven Renault F1 Team
- Notable drivers: 7. (Italy) Jarno Trulli; 7. (Canada) Jacques Villeneuve; 8. (Spain) Fernando Alonso
- Debut: 2004 Australian Grand Prix
- First win: 2004 Monaco Grand Prix
- Last win: 2004 Monaco Grand Prix
- Last event: 2004 Brazilian Grand Prix
Races	Wins	Poles	F/Laps
18	1	3	0
- Constructors' Championships: 0
- Drivers' Championships: 0

The Renault R24 is a Formula One car that competed in the 2004 Formula One World Championship.

== Design and development ==
The chassis was designed by Mike Gascoyne, Bob Bell, Tim Densham and Dino Toso with Pat Symonds overseeing the design and production of the car as executive director of Engineering and Bernard Dudot leading the engine design.

=== R24B ===
Renault brought a new, updated R24B model to San Marino Grand Prix, featuring new cylinder heads, inlet system and related changes to the bottom part of the engine.

== Racing history ==
The car showed speed and reliability during the season, managing to outpace both the Williams and McLaren, as well as proving to be a consistent challenger to the equally fast BAR Hondas of Jenson Button and Takuma Sato. However, it was bested by the Ferrari F2004 of Michael Schumacher and Rubens Barrichello, with which the Ferrari duo won 15 of the 18 races in 2004. Going into the season, Renault announced that their driver line-up was Jarno Trulli and Fernando Alonso.

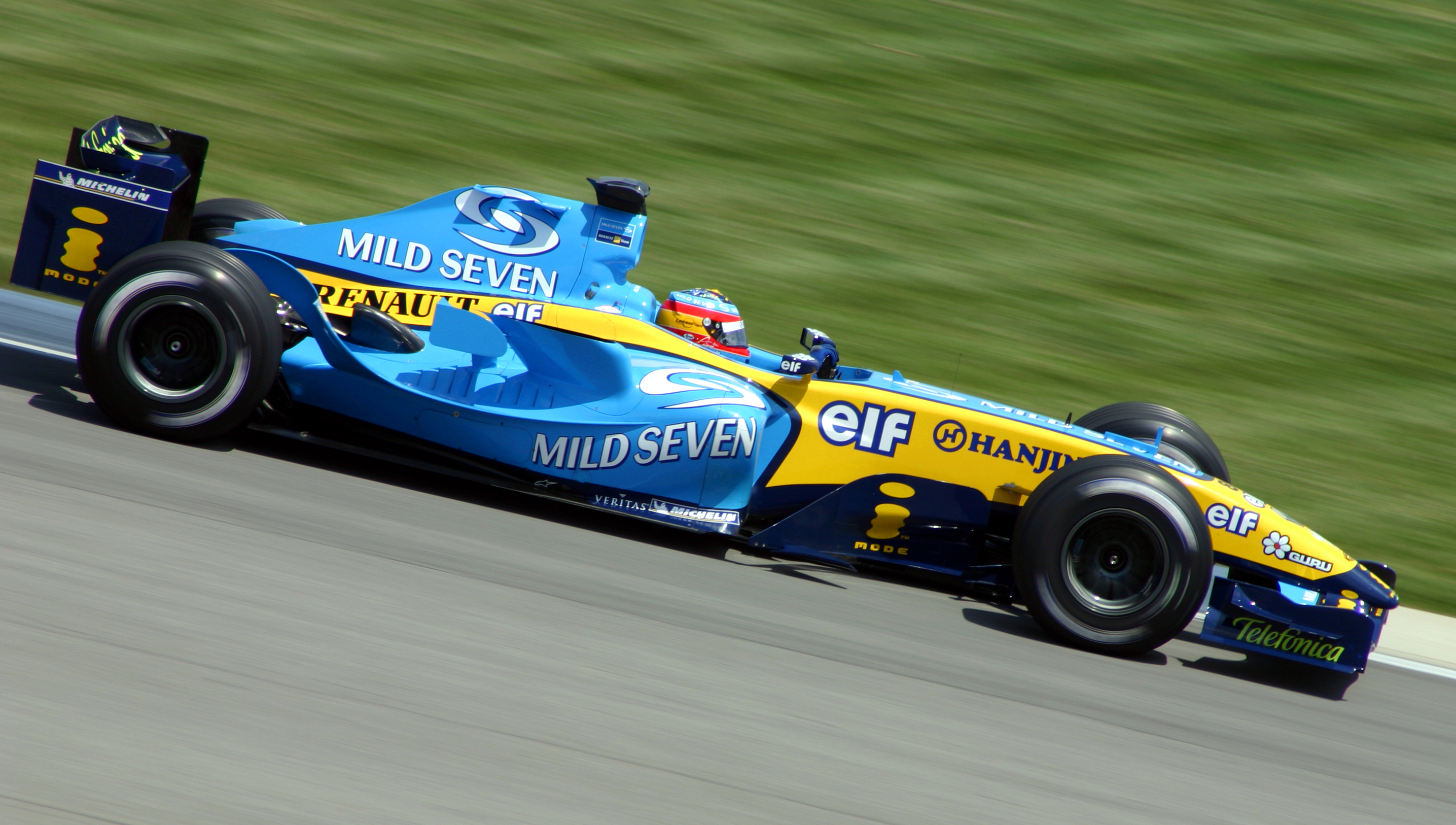
Fernando Alonso driving the R24 at the 2004 United States Grand Prix.

The team became real contenders for second place in the Constructors' Championship when Trulli and Alonso placed third and fourth respectively during the Spanish Grand Prix. Trulli won the Monaco Grand Prix. However, his relationship with Renault (particularly with team principal and Trulli's ex-manager Flavio Briatore) deteriorated after he was consistently off the pace in the latter half of the year, and made claims of favouritism in the team towards Alonso (though the two teammates themselves remained friendly).

The French Grand Prix is considered the final straw for Renault, where Trulli was overtaken by Rubens Barrichello in the final stages of the last lap, costing Renault a double podium finish at their home Grand Prix. Trulli was later fired after failing to score points in 5 successive races. After that, he announced that he was joining Toyota F1 for the following year and left Renault early, driving the Toyota in the last two races of the 2004 season.

Hoping to secure second place in the Constructors' Championship, Renault replaced Trulli with 1997 World Champion Jacques Villeneuve for the final three races. However, Villeneuve — away from F1 racing for almost an entire season — struggled to adjust quickly to racing at the premier level and did not impress, resulting in the team finishing third behind Villeneuve's former team - BAR with 105 points.

== Sponsorship and livery ==
The livery was completely different from the previous two seasons with removal of the dark blue accent on the engine cover whereas the rear wing was previously white. The season saw Renault receive new sponsorship from Telefónica and i-Mode while Hanjin was retained for a second year.

Renault used the 'Mild Seven' logos, except at the Canadian, French and British Grands Prix, where they were replaced with their number and driver names and all team members replaced it with on their clothing the text "Team Spirit".

== Use in Top Gear ==
The R24 was "loaned" to The Stig for an episode of Top Gear. Renault claimed it would go around the Top Gear test track in less than one minute; the R24 got around in 59.0 seconds, being the fastest any car had gone around the track, whether it was on the show or not. It was later revealed by Renault that the R24 was driven not by the regular Stig, but rather their test driver Heikki Kovalainen, disguised as the Stig. The record would still remain unbeaten for 21 years until the McMurtry Spéirling broke the record by 3.1 seconds, getting a 55.9 second lap on the board.

== Complete Formula One results ==
(key) (results in bold indicate pole position)

Year	Team	Engine	Tyres	Drivers	1	2	3	4	5	6	7	8	9	10	11	12	13	14	15	16	17	18	Points	WCC
2004	Renault F1	Renault V10	**MI**		AUS	MAL	BHR	SMR	ESP	MON	EUR	CAN	USA	FRA	GBR	GER	HUN	BEL	ITA	CHN	JPN	BRA	**105**	**3rd**
2004	Renault F1	Renault V10	**MI**	(Italy) Jarno Trulli	7	5	4	5	3	**1**	4	Ret	4	4	Ret	11	Ret	**9**	10				**105**	**3rd**
2004	Renault F1	Renault V10	**MI**	(Spain) Fernando Alonso	3	7	6	4	4	Ret	5	Ret	Ret	**2**	10	3	3	Ret	Ret	4	5	4	**105**	**3rd**
2004	Renault F1	Renault V10	**MI**	(Canada) Jacques Villeneuve																11	10	10	**105**	**3rd**
