= Renault R26 =

Formula One racing car

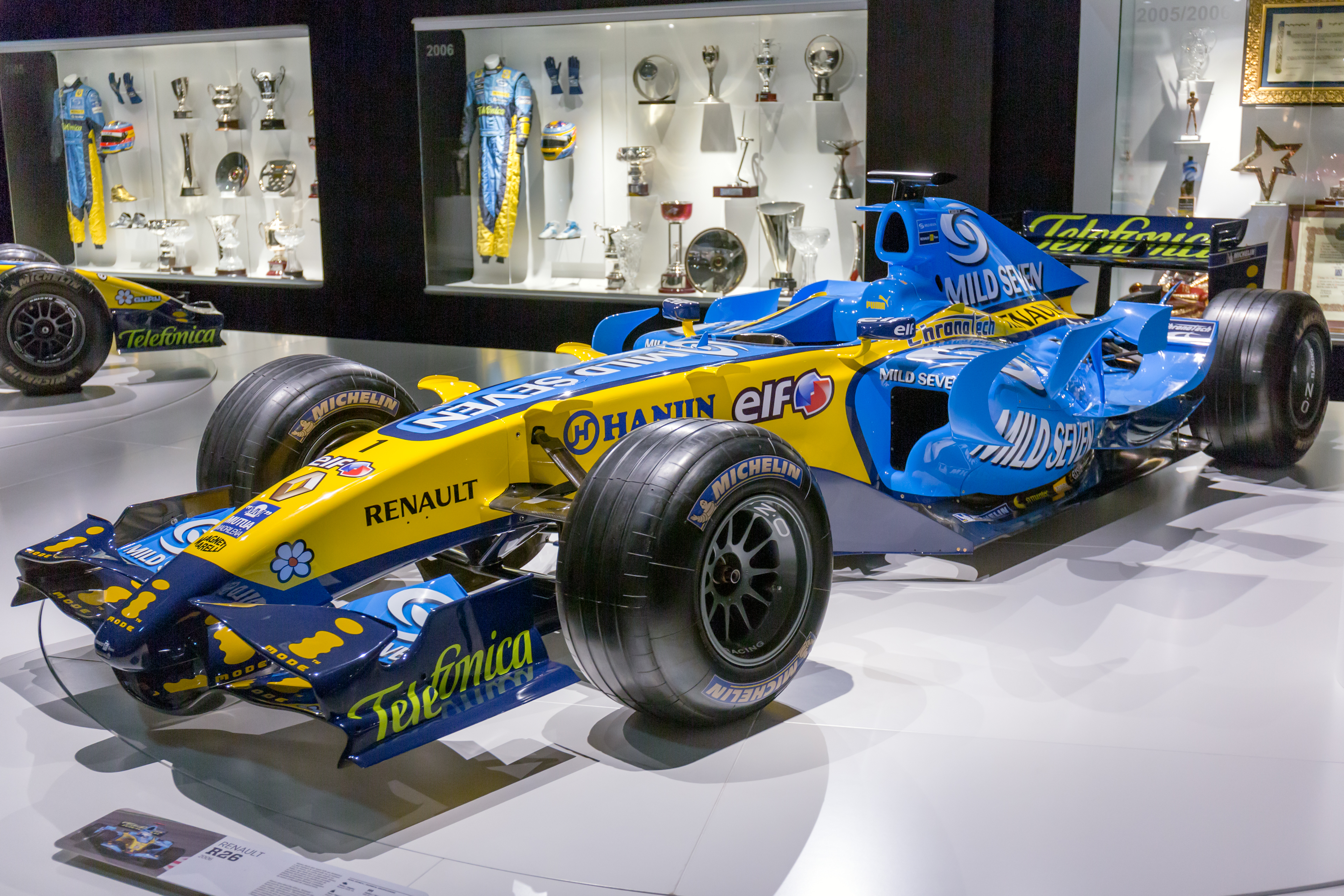
- The R26 on display at Fernando Alonso Sports Complex
- Category: Formula One
- Constructor: Renault
- Designers: Pat Symonds (Executive Engineer); Bob Bell (Technical Director); James Allison (Deputy Technical Director); Tim Densham (Chief Designer); Martin Tolliday (Deputy Chief Designer); Tad Czapski (Technology Director); Robin Tuluie (Head of R&D); Rob Marshall (Concept Lead - Tuned Mass Damper); Dino Toso (Head of Aerodynamics); Jon Tomlinson (Deputy Head of Aerodynamics); Rob White (Engine Technical Director); Léon Taillieu (Project Manager - Engine)
- Predecessor: R25
- Successor: R27

Technical specifications
- Chassis: Carbon fibre and honeycomb composite structure
- Suspension (front): Double wishbone/pushrod operating torsion bar
- Suspension (rear): As front
- Length: 4,800 mm (189 in)
- Width: 1,800 mm (71 in)
- Height: 950 mm (37 in)
- Axle track: 1,450 mm (57 in) (front); 1,400 mm (55 in) (rear)
- Wheelbase: 3,100 mm (122 in)
- Engine: Mecachrome-built Renault RS26 (2.4L) 2,398 cc (146 cu in) V8 90° naturally aspirated, mid engined, longitudinally-mounted
- Transmission: Renault 7-speed + 1 reverse titanium longitudinal sequential semi-automatic transmission
- Power: 755-775 hp @ 20,500 rpm
- Weight: 605 kg (1,334 lb) with driver, camera and ballast
- Fuel: Elf Atmo 98.5 RON
- Lubricants: Elf Evolution 900 SXR
- Tyres: Michelin

Competition history
- Notable entrants: Mild Seven Renault F1 Team
- Notable drivers: 1. (Spain) Fernando Alonso; 2. (Italy) Giancarlo Fisichella
- Debut: 2006 Bahrain Grand Prix
- First win: 2006 Bahrain Grand Prix
- Last win: 2006 Japanese Grand Prix
- Last event: 2006 Brazilian Grand Prix
Races	Wins	Podiums	Poles	F/Laps
18	8	19	7	5
- Constructors' Championships: 1 (2006)
- Drivers' Championships: 1 (Alonso, 2006)

The Renault R26 is a Formula One racing car, used by the Renault F1 team in the 2006 Formula One season. The chassis was designed by Bob Bell, James Allison, Tim Densham and Dino Toso with Pat Symonds overseeing the design and production of the car as executive director of Engineering and Rob White leading the engine design. The car was driven by Fernando Alonso and Giancarlo Fisichella.

This was the first V8-powered Enstone-based Formula One car since the Benetton B194 in 1994.

== Season overview ==
Over the course of the season it scored 8 wins out of 18 races, followed closely by the rival Ferrari 248 F1. The R26 helped Renault in claiming the Constructors' Championship with a 5-point advantage over rival Ferrari, and also taking Fernando Alonso to his second Drivers' Championship in succession, 13 points ahead of rival Michael Schumacher. It brought the last Constructors' Championship in recent history to tyre manufacturer Michelin.

Like its rival the Ferrari 248 F1, the R26 was notable for its rock-solid reliability, chassis R26-03 driven by Fernando Alonso started all of the races of the 2006 season without the need to be replaced (F1 drivers usually go through multiple chassis in a season), it also led more laps and won more races than any single chassis in 2006 in addition to winning the world championship. R26-03 now sits at Renault's “Histoire et Collection” heritage collection in Paris.

The R26 was succeeded by the R27 for the 2007 season.

== Mass damper ==
A tuned mass damper, also known as a harmonic absorber, is a device that is attached to structures in order to reduce the strength of vibrations passing through them. Tuned mass dampers are used in buildings across the world to reduce the effects of earthquakes and strong gusts of wind. In the Renault R26, this technology was used for a more benign purpose. It was used to keep the front of car stable over kerbs and through slow and fast corners. Keeping the front of the car stable is crucial to the aerodynamic efficiency of the car because changes in ride height - caused by bumps on the road or changes in downforce levels due to speed - can alter the way that air passes over the front wing of the car and therefore the rest of the car's aerodynamic efficiency also suffers. The Tuned mass damper in the Renault R26 was invented by Renault engineer Rob Marshall. The mass damper itself was a cylinder, standing upright, with the mechanical components inside. Inside the cylinder sat a 9 kilogram disc which rested in between two springs. The disc was free to move on the Y-axis with its only hindrance, the springs that it was attached to and the damper fluid within the cylinder. The whole assembly was attached to the chassis inside the nosecone of the car. The device was then 'tuned' to the needs of each track by either changing the clearance between the disc and the cylinder bore or by adjusting the size of two-way valve within the disc itself. The Tuned mass damper on the Renault R26 vibrated in the opposite direction from the chassis due to inertia, with its magnitude calculated by the 'tuning' variables mentioned above. This counteracting force stabilized the front end of the car over kerbs and through slow and fast corners.

Renault first introduced the technology in its 2005 challenger, Renault R25 at the 2005 Brazilian Grand Prix and had been deemed to be legal by the stewards. During the first half of the 2006 season, Renault had built up a comfortable points lead over their main rivals Ferrari. However, at the time of the German Grand Prix at the Hockenheimring the FIA decided to ban all the teams from using tuned mass dampers in their car. Even though the system was deemed legal for over half a year, the FIA decided that it broke the rule that no moving part can influence the aerodynamics of the car. Renault claimed that the loss of the system cost them 0.3 seconds a lap. The ban hurt the Renault team more than their competitors because Renault had designed their whole car around the technology, meanwhile, their competitors had just included the technology as an after-thought after seeing Renault's implementation. This was clearly visible because Ferrari won 5 of the 7 remaining races in the season. However, the French team managed to defend both championship titles successfully.

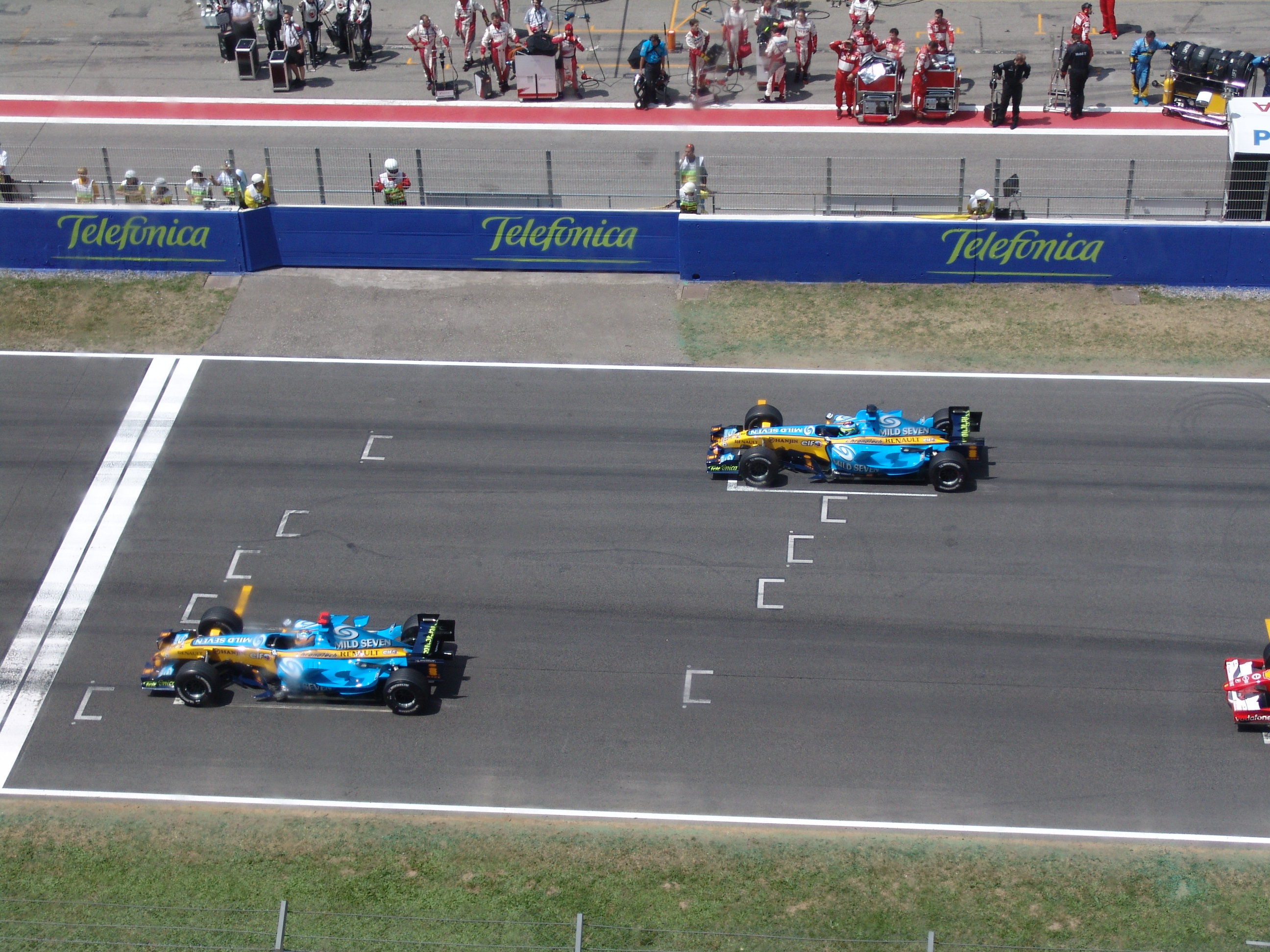
Alonso and Fisichella took a front row at the Spanish Grand Prix.

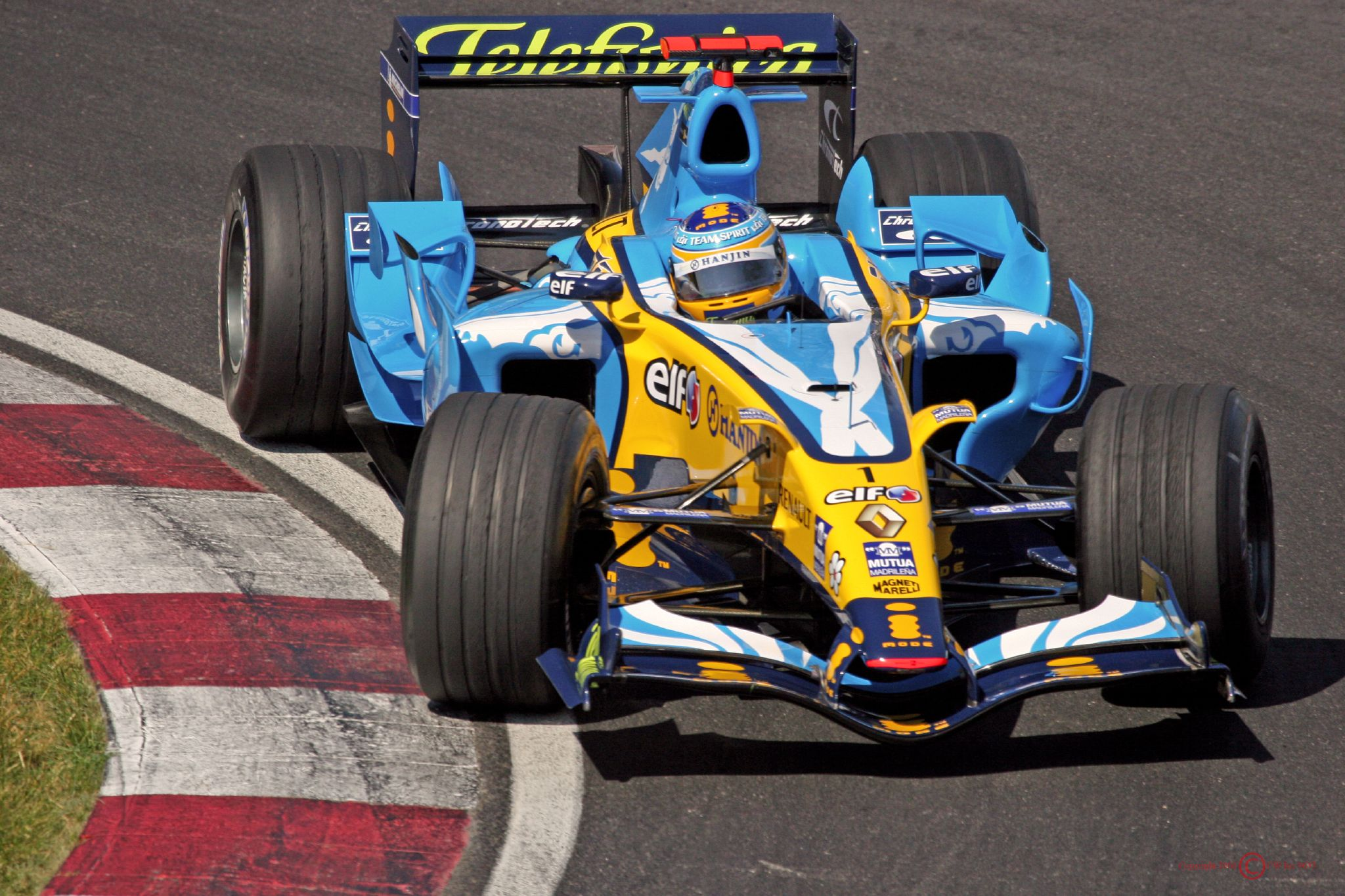
Alonso in chassis R26-03 at the Canadian Grand Prix.

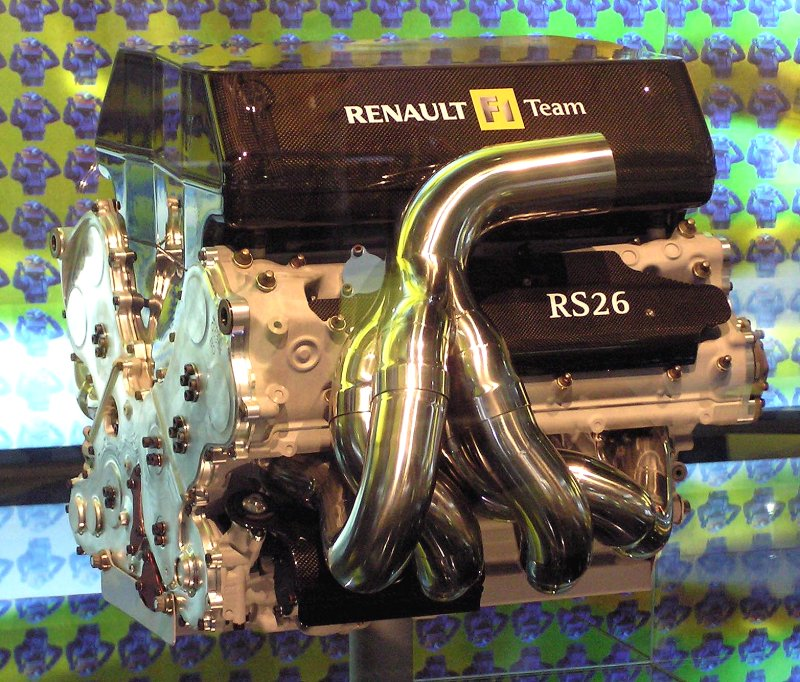
Renault RS26 engine.

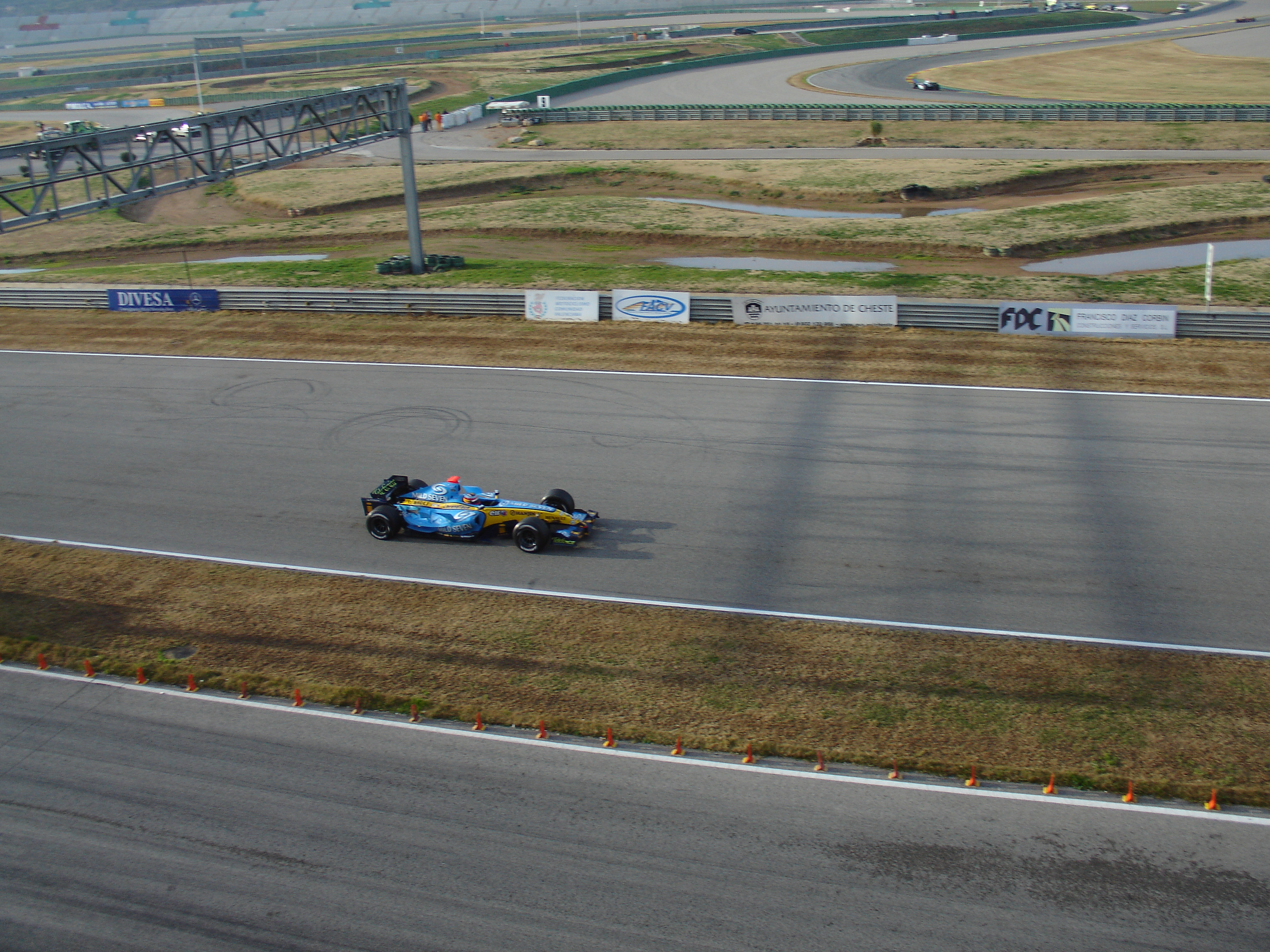
Alonso driving the R26 in a testing session held in February 2006 at Circuit de Valencia.

== Sponsorship and livery ==
This was the final year for Renault/the Enstone team's long-term deal with Mild Seven, which they had held since the Benetton period, after a regulation mandated the banning the tobacco advertising at the end of the season. As a result the team decided to not renew the sponsorship deal agreement.

Renault used the 'Mild Seven' logos, except at the San Marino, European, British, Canadian, French, German, Turkish, Italian and Brazilian Grands Prix. At these races, the team replaced the logos with shark, tribals, spiral and flame graphics as well with the random text "Team Spirit".

== Drivers' helmets ==
Giancarlo Fisichella wore a special helmet at the French Grand Prix to celebrate the Italian team's victory at the 2006 FIFA World Cup in Berlin.

== Other ==
The R26 appears as a playable vehicle in Formula One 06 and Formula One Championship Edition. It would appear in F1 2017 and its subsequent releases as a classic car. It also appears in Grid and Grid Legends.

== Complete Formula One results ==
(key) (results in bold indicate pole position; results in italics indicate fastest lap)

Year	Team	Engine	Tyres	Drivers	1	2	3	4	5	6	7	8	9	10	11	12	13	14	15	16	17	18	Points	WCC
2006	Mild Seven Renault F1 Team	Renault RS26 V8	**M**		BHR	MAL	AUS	SMR	EUR	ESP	MON	GBR	CAN	USA	FRA	GER	HUN	TUR	ITA	CHN	JPN	BRA	**206**	**1st**
2006	Mild Seven Renault F1 Team	Renault RS26 V8	**M**	(Spain) Fernando Alonso	1	2	1	2	**2**	**1**	**1**	**1**	**1**	5	2	5	Ret	2	Ret	**2**	1	2	**206**	**1st**
2006	Mild Seven Renault F1 Team	Renault RS26 V8	**M**	(Italy) Giancarlo Fisichella	Ret	**1**	5	8	6	3	6	4	4	3	6	6	Ret	6	4	3	3	6	**206**	**1st**

Awards
Preceded by McLaren MP4-20	Autosport; Racing Car Of The Year; 2006	Succeeded by McLaren MP4-22
