= Renault R25 =

Winning racing car of the 2005 Formula One World Championship

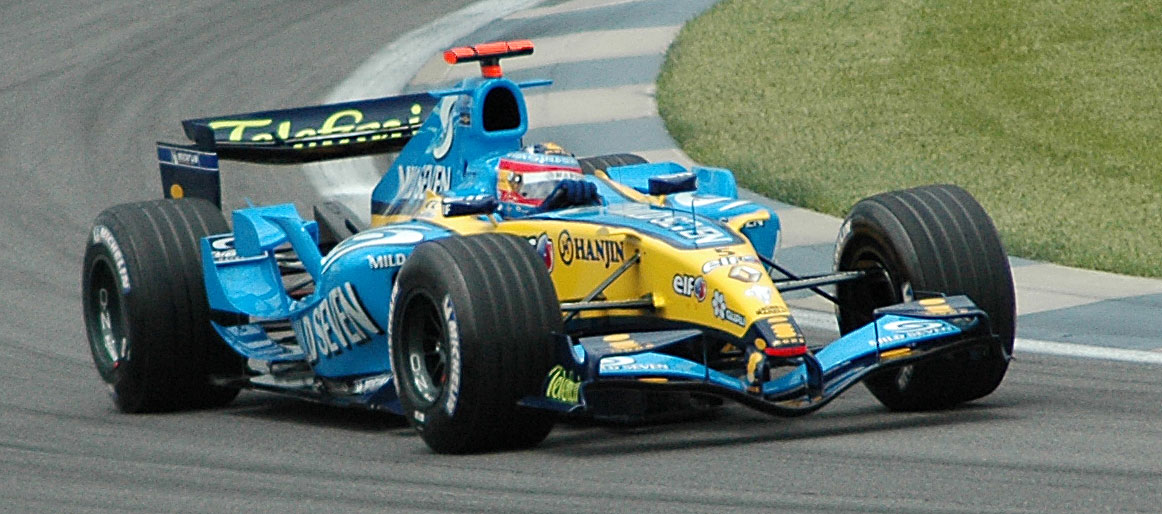
- Fernando Alonso driving a Renault R25 at Indianapolis in 2005
- Category: Formula One
- Constructor: Renault
- Designers: Pat Symonds (Executive Engineer); Bob Bell (Technical Director); James Allison (Deputy Technical Director); Tim Densham (Chief Designer); Martin Tolliday (Deputy Chief Designer); Tad Czapski (Technology Director); Robin Tuluie (Head of R&D); Dino Toso (Head of Aerodynamics); Jon Tomlinson (Deputy Head of Aerodynamics); Bernard Dudot (Engine Technical Director); Axel Plasse (Project Manager - Engine)
- Predecessor: R24
- Successor: R26

Technical specifications
- Chassis: Carbon-fibre monocoque
- Length: 4,600 mm (181 in)
- Width: 1,800 mm (71 in)
- Height: 950 mm (37 in)
- Axle track: 1,450 mm (57 in) (front); 1,400 mm (55 in) (rear)
- Wheelbase: 3,100 mm (122 in)
- Engine: Renault RS25 3.0 L (183 cu in) V10 72° naturally aspirated, mid engined, longitudinally-mounted
- Transmission: Renault 6-speed sequential semi-automatic gearbox
- Power: 800–900 hp (597–671 kW) @ 19,000 RPM
- Weight: 605 kg (1,334 lb) with driver, camera and ballast
- Fuel: Elf
- Lubricants: Elf
- Tyres: Michelin

Competition history
- Notable entrants: Mild Seven Renault F1 Team
- Notable drivers: 5. (Spain) Fernando Alonso; 6. (Italy) Giancarlo Fisichella
- Debut: 2005 Australian Grand Prix
- First win: 2005 Australian Grand Prix
- Last win: 2005 Chinese Grand Prix
- Last event: 2005 Chinese Grand Prix
Races	Wins	Poles	F/Laps
19	8	7	3
- Constructors' Championships: 1 (2005)
- Drivers' Championships: 1 (2005, Fernando Alonso)

The Renault R25 was the Formula One car entered by Renault in the 2005 Formula One season. The chassis was designed by Bob Bell, James Allison, Tim Densham and Dino Toso with Pat Symonds overseeing the design and production of the car as executive director of Engineering and Bernard Dudot leading the engine design.

The car won both the Drivers' and Constructors' Championships in 2005, the first titles for any car racing with a French licence since the Matra MS80's triumph in the 1969 season. It also became the first Renault-powered Formula One car to win both championship titles since the Williams FW19 in 1997 and also the first Enstone-based Formula One car to win the world constructors' championship since the Benetton B195 in 1995.

== History ==
During the season, the car turned out to be slower than the McLaren MP4-20 at numerous points, with the win tally being 8–10. Reliability and consistency prevailed in the end, with Fernando Alonso and Giancarlo Fisichella taking the car to the last win and titles for a V10 powered Formula One car, marking the end of an era.

This car also claimed Michelin's first of only two titles since its return in Formula One, winning the title again with Renault (the R26 2006-spec car) in the 2006 season, the last for the French tyre maker. The R25 was the first Constructors' Championship winning car since 1991 not to have been designed by either Adrian Newey or Rory Byrne.

Over 19 races, it scored 191 points, 8 wins, 15 podiums and was fully out of the points just twice in 18 starts (not counting the United States Grand Prix where both Renault drivers, in common with all their fellow Michelin tyre runners, withdrew prior to starting).

The R25 was also the last Renault Formula One car to use a 6-speed gearbox before the switch to a mandatory 7-speed gearbox in the following season.

== Mass damper ==
The tuned mass damper was introduced as part of the suspension system by Renault on its car the R25, at the 2005 Brazilian Grand Prix. The system reportedly reduced lap times by 0.3 seconds: a phenomenal gain for a relatively simple device. The stewards of the meeting deemed it legal, but the FIA appealed against that decision.

Two weeks later, the FIA International Court of Appeal deemed the mass damper illegal. It was deemed to be illegal because the mass was not rigidly attached to the chassis; the influence the damper had on the pitch attitude of the car in turn affected the gap under the car and the ground effects of the car. As such, the damper was considered to be a movable aerodynamic device and hence an illegal influence on the performance of the aerodynamics.

== Sponsorship and livery ==
Renault used the 'Mild Seven' logos, except at the Canadian, French, British, Turkish, Italian and Belgian Grands Prix. At these races, the team replaced the logos with Phoenix, flowers, tribals and flame graphics as well with the random text "Team Spirit".

== Gallery ==
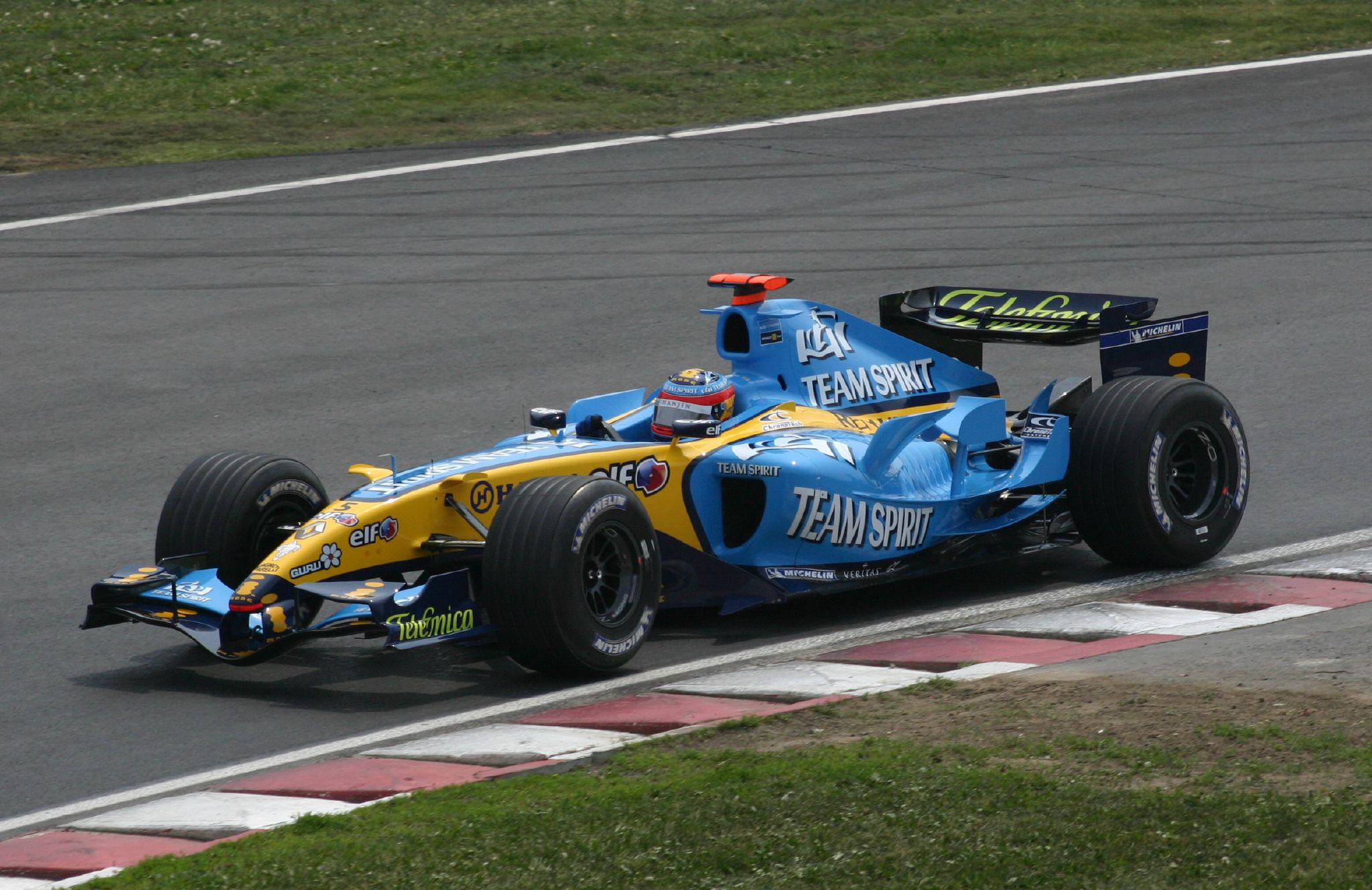
Fernando Alonso at the 2005 Canadian Grand Prix with the Mild Seven logo replaced with Team Spirit instead

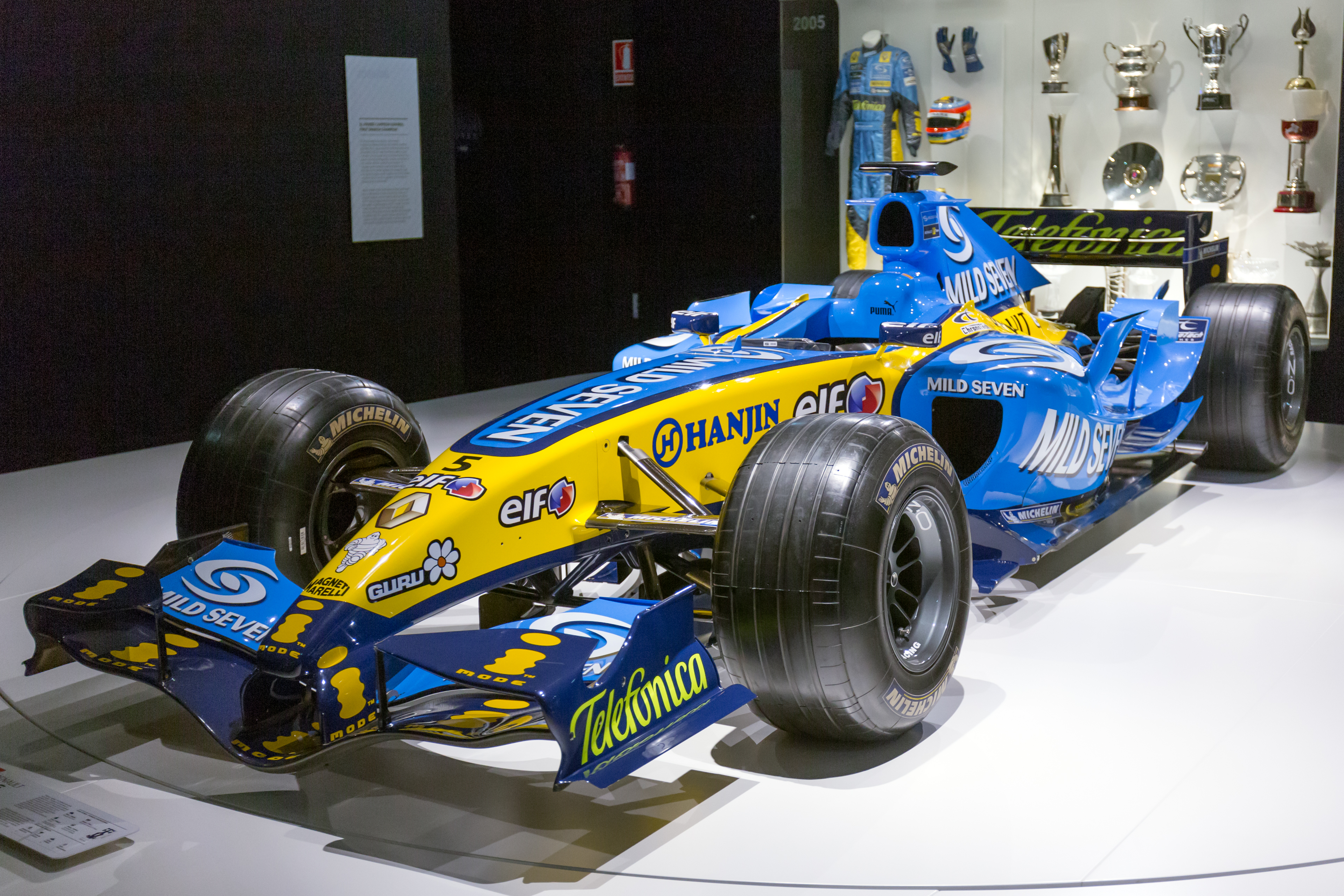
Front view of Fernando Alonso's Renault R25 at Museo Fernando Alonso

== Later uses ==
In Episode 8 of Series 10 of the BBC show Top Gear, in 2007, presenter Richard Hammond drove the R25 around the Stowe Circuit at Silverstone, completing two laps.

On 11 December 2020 Alonso drove the car for the first time in 15 years, hours before the start of the first practice session shown on Sky Sports, and after the qualifying session for the 2020 Abu Dhabi Grand Prix. The car used Pirelli demo slick tyres, rather than the original Michelin grooved tyres.

== Complete Formula One results ==
(key) (results in bold indicate pole position; races in italics indicate fastest laps)

Year	Team	Engine	Tyres	Drivers	1	2	3	4	5	6	7	8	9	10	11	12	13	14	15	16	17	18	19	Points	WCC
2005	Renault	Renault V10	**MI**		AUS	MAL	BHR	SMR	ESP	MON	EUR	CAN	USA	FRA	GBR	GER	HUN	TUR	ITA	BEL	BRA	JPN	CHN	**191**	**1st**
2005	Renault	Renault V10	**MI**	(Spain) Fernando Alonso	3	**1**	**1**	1	2	4	1	Ret	DNS	**1**	**2**	1	11	2	2	2	**3**	3	**1**	**191**	**1st**
2005	Renault	Renault V10	**MI**	(Italy) Giancarlo Fisichella	**1**	Ret	Ret	Ret	5	12	6	Ret	DNS	6	4	4	9	4	3	Ret	5	2	4	**191**	**1st**
