= Fernando Alonso Sports Complex =

Museo y Circuito Fernando Alonso
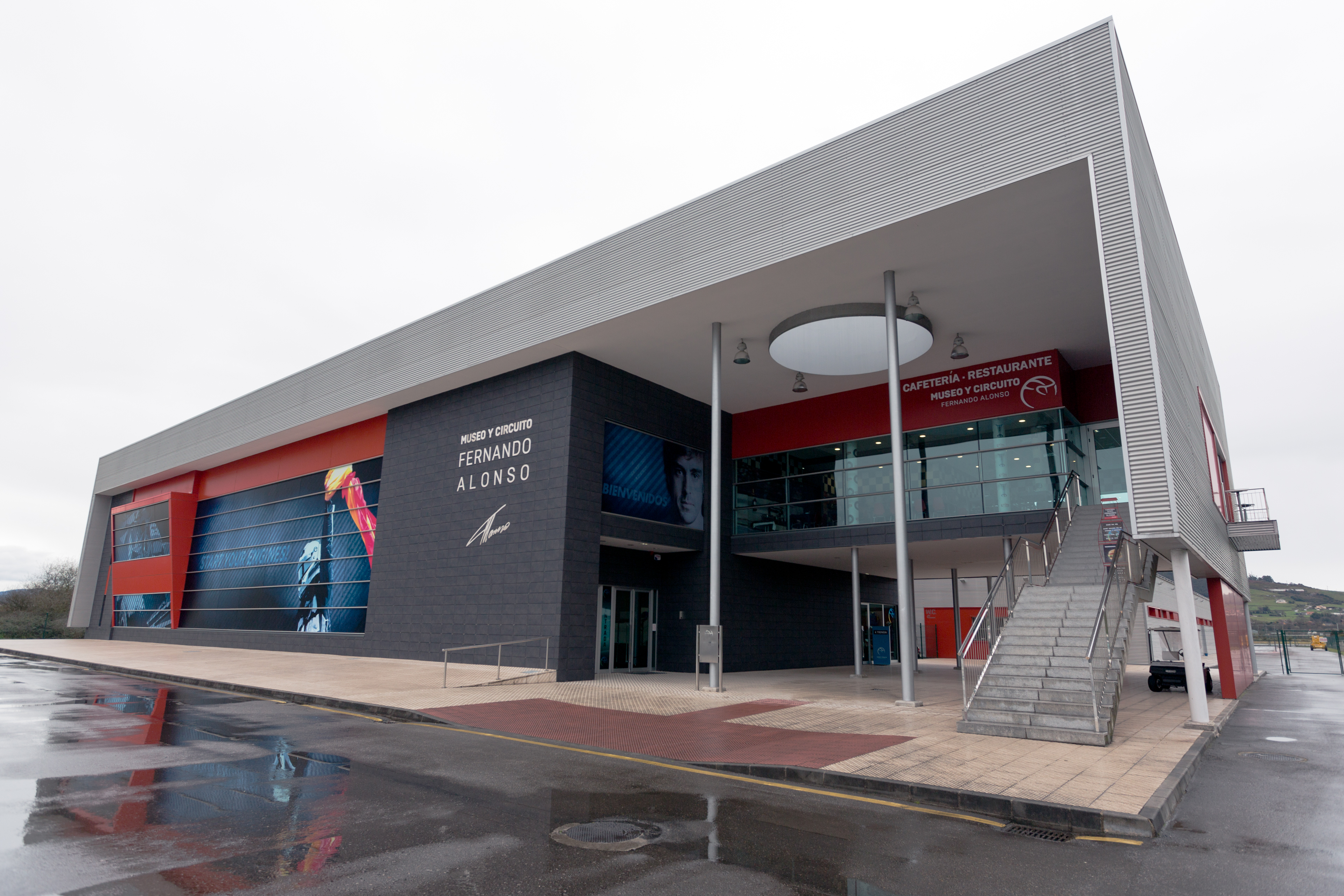
- Established: 2011
- Location: Llanera, Asturias, Spain
- Coordinates: 43.42768°N 5.82862°W
- Type: Transport museum
- Collection size: Over 270 items
- Website: http://www.fernandoalonso.com/en/museum/

The Fernando Alonso Sports Complex (Spanish: Complejo Deportivo Fernando Alonso, also known as Spanish: Museo y Circuito Fernando Alonso) is a sports project dedicated to the promotion of motorsport and a memorial to Fernando Alonso, a two-times Formula One World Drivers' Champion from Oviedo, Asturias, Spain. The facility is located in Llanera, Asturias.

== Facilities ==
The complex includes a museum about Fernando Alonso, a kart circuit, and a golf course.

=== Museum ===
The complex's Fernando Alonso Collection includes most of the racing cars which Alonso has competed in since the age of 3, racing suits and helmets he wore, and the trophies which he won. Apart from those originating from Alonso himself, his helmet collection of other professional drivers is on exhibit.

Notable collection

- All Formula One cars which Alonso raced before 2016 including the championship winning Renault R25 and R26 and the 2018 McLaren MCL33 with the special Abu Dhabi livery
- Renault RS25 engine from the 2005 Formula One season
- 2017 McLaren-Honda-Andretti Dallara DW12. Which Alonso drove in the 2017 Indianapolis 500.
- 2018 Toyota TS050 Hybrid in which he won that season's 24h of Le Mans

=== Kart circuit ===
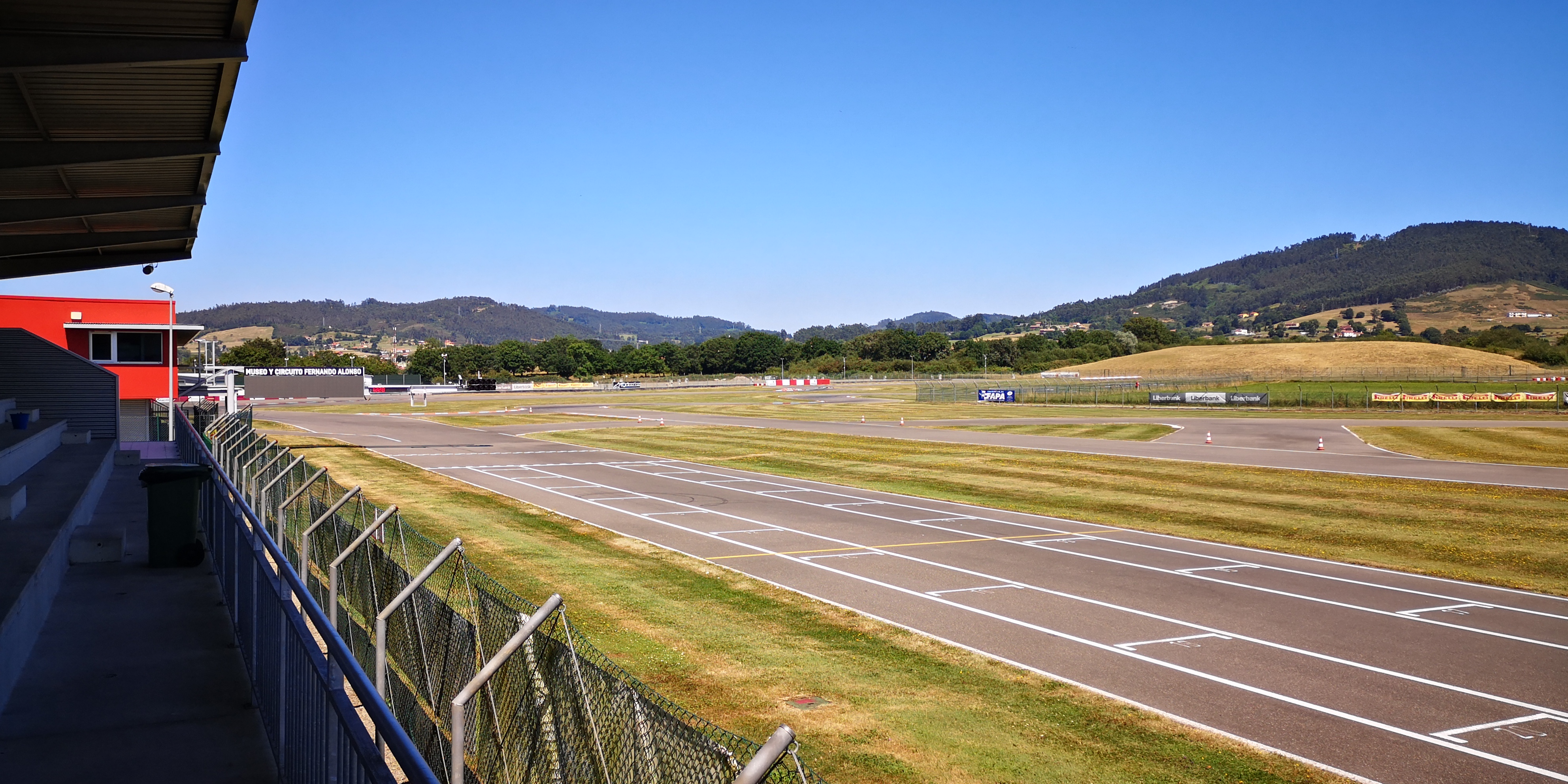
Kart circuit.

The karting circuit is spread over 44,446.54 m² and was designed and built with the possibility of making twenty-nine different tracks, whose lengths vary between 1,400 and 1,800 meters. The main circuit can be divided into three secondary courses of 721, 637 and 372 meters to facilitate training. It is approved to host international competitions at the highest level according to CIK-FIA standards.

The circuit was premiered by Fernando Alonso himself on March 18, 2011, in front of 4,000 people.
