= James Allison (motorsport) =

English motorsport designer and engineer (born 1968)

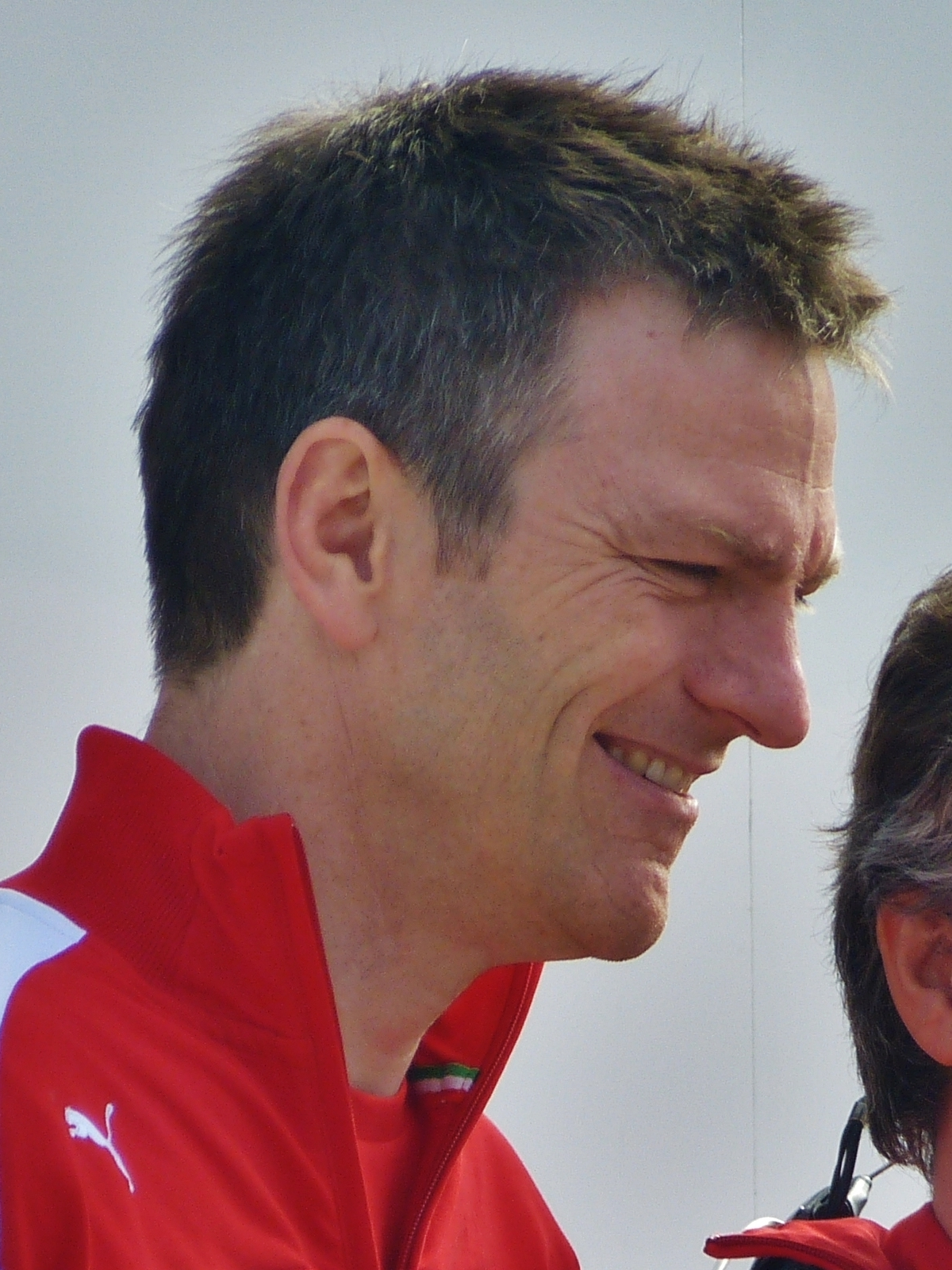
- Allison in 2014
- Born: 21 February 1968 (age 58); Louth, Lincolnshire, England
- Education: University of Cambridge
- Occupations: Formula One chief technical officer, engineer, aerodynamicist
- Years active: 1991–present
- Employer: Mercedes-AMG Petronas F1 Team
- Known for: Formula One aerodynamicist
- Predecessor: Paddy Lowe
- Spouse: Rebecca (m. 1992; died 2016)
- Children: 3

James Allison (born 21 February 1968) is a British motorsport designer and engineer, best known for his accomplishments in Formula One, where he is the technical director of the Mercedes-AMG Petronas F1 Team.

== Early life ==
Born in Louth, Lincolnshire, the son of former Royal Air Force officer, Air Chief Marshal Sir John Allison, and Jill Allison, James was educated at Abingdon School and Cambridge.

== Career ==
=== Benetton, Larrousse, and Ferrari (1991–2005) ===
After graduating from Cambridge in 1991, Allison joined the aerodynamics department of Benetton Formula. After a couple of years at Benetton, he moved to Larrousse as head of aerodynamics, before returning to Benetton as head of aerodynamics in the mid-1990s. In 2000, he moved to Ferrari for five years.

=== Renault/Lotus (2005–2013) ===
Allison moved to Renault F1 (the former Benetton team) in the role of deputy technical director in 2005. In 2009 Allison became technical director. In 2011, Renault F1 became Lotus Renault GP, before becoming Lotus F1 in 2012.

=== Return to Ferrari (2013–2016) ===
On 8 May 2013, Allison quit as Lotus F1 Team technical director to be replaced by Nick Chester. On 29 July 2013, Allison rejoined Ferrari as chassis technical director and then technical director until July 2016. On 27 July 2016, Allison quit as Scuderia Ferrari technical director following the death of his wife.

=== Mercedes-AMG (2017–present) ===
On 16 February 2017, Mercedes-AMG Petronas Motorsport announced that Allison was to join the team in the newly created role of technical director, following the departure of Paddy Lowe to Williams Grand Prix Engineering.

In April 2021, Allison became Chief Technical Officer at Mercedes-AMG. He also became the Chief Technical Officer at Ineos Team UK Britannia's America's Cup team. This role positioned Allison as technical lead of Ben Ainslie's campaign for the 37th America's Cup, with Mercedes-AMG F1 Applied Science partnering with their existing sailing and design teams, which include Ainslie, Giles Scott, and prominent naval architect and yacht designer Martin Fischer. On 21 April 2023, Allison returned to his previous position as Technical Director of Mercedes-AMG F1, swapping jobs with Mike Elliott, who had taken his place earlier.

== Formula One Championships ==
Allison was part of the design team for the cars that won the following Formula One World Constructors' Championships and World Drivers' Championships:

No.	Season	Constructors' Champion	Drivers' Champion	Car	Engine
1	2000	Ferrari	Michael Schumacher	F1-2000	Ferrari
2	2001	Ferrari	Michael Schumacher	F2001	Ferrari
3	2002	Ferrari	Michael Schumacher	F2002	Ferrari
4	2003	Ferrari	Michael Schumacher	F2003-GA	Ferrari
5	2004	Ferrari	Michael Schumacher	Ferrari F2004	Ferrari
6	2005	Renault	Fernando Alonso	R25	Renault
7	2006	Renault	Fernando Alonso	R26	Renault
8	2018	Mercedes	Lewis Hamilton	W09	Mercedes
9	2019	Mercedes	Lewis Hamilton	W10	Mercedes
10	2020	Mercedes	Lewis Hamilton	W11	Mercedes
11	2021	Mercedes	—	W12	Mercedes
12	2026	Mercedes	Kimi Antonelli	W17	Mercedes

== See also ==
- List of Old Abingdonians
