= Rob White (Formula One) =

British Formula One engineer

- Born: Robert White; 15 July 1965 (age 61); Camblesforth, West Riding of Yorkshire, England
- Occupation: Chief Operating Officer
- Employer: Cadillac Formula One Team

Robert White (born 15 July 1965) is a Formula One engineer from England. He is the Chief Operating Officer for the Cadillac Formula One Team.

== Career ==
White was born in Camblesforth, West Riding of Yorkshire. After leaving school he worked for Jaguar Cars, who agreed to sponsor him to take a mechanical engineering course at Southampton University. White graduated with a bachelor's degree in 1987. Upon graduating, White responded to an advertisement from Cosworth Racing Limited and was hired as a development engineer for their IndyCar project, working under Chief Engineer Steve Miller.

In 1990, White was promoted to the position of senior development engineer. In 1993 he moved to California as track support manager for Cosworth USA.

In 1997, White returned to England and worked as chief engineer to Cosworth's Formula One operations. In 2003, three years before Ford left Formula One and a year before Cosworth was sold to Kevin Kalkhoven, White left Cosworth. The following year he moved to the Renault F1 team to act as engine technical director alongside Bob Bell (chassis technical director).

In April 2005, White was promoted to deputy managing director of the engine operations at Renault F1, following the departure of Bernard Dudot. This meant moving to Renault's engine department located in Viry-Châtillon, France. At the time of his appointment, White did not speak French despite being required to lead a predominantly French workforce. He also retained his role as technical director.

In 2016, White moved to became the director of operations for Team Enstone. He departed from the team (then known as Alpine) in 2024.

White joined the Cadillac F1 Team in late 2024, as Chief Operations Officer.
