= Jon Tomlinson =

British aerodynamicist (born 1973)

- Born: 9 January 1973 (age 53)
- Education: Brunel University of London (BSc)
- Occupation: Aerodynamicist
- Years active: 2000-2026
- Employer: Cadillac Formula One

Jon Tomlinson (born 9 January 1973) is a British Formula One aerodynamicist who most recently served as Head of Aerodynamics at Cadillac, having previously served in similar roles at Williams and Renault.

== Career ==
After completing a BSc Industrial Design degree at Brunel University in 1995, he was appointed a Design Engineer role for Handford Racing Services Ltd, working on aerodynamic development of Newman-Haas Racing's Lola Indycars. In 1996, he became an Aerodynamicist for Swift Engineering Ltd. in California, developing the 1997 and 1998 race winning Swift Indycars. In 1998 he became Chief Aerodynamicist for Precision Preparation Inc./Cal Wells Racing, also in California, until 2000. He then returned to the UK, entered Formula One with the Jordan Grand Prix team as Senior Aerodynamicist, until 2002 when Renault F1 hired him as a Senior Aerodynamicist, before his promotion to Deputy Head of Aerodynamics in 2003. It is in this position that he was heavily involved in the back-to-back 2005/2006 World Championship wins.

In November 2006, Williams F1 hired him as Head of Aerodynamics. After 5 years in this position, he resigned at the beginning of May 2011, after Williams' troubled start to the 2011 Formula One season.

In December 2022, Tomlinson joined Andretti Global to serve as Head of Aerodynamics for their upcoming Cadillac Formula One Team, which entered the sport in 2026.

In September 2026, Cadillac the team signed former Aston Martin Aerodynamics and Deputy Technical Director Eric Blandin, having previously worked at Mercedes, joining as Head of Aerodynamics, thus replacing Tomlinson.
