= Dino Toso =

Italian-Dutch engineer (1969–2008)

- Born: Dino Vittorio Marcellinus Toso; 11 February 1969; Delft, Netherlands
- Died: August 13, 2008 (aged 39); Oxford, England
- Occupation: Engineer
- Spouse: Nathalie Toso
- Children: 1

Dino Vittorio Marcellinus Toso (11 February 1969 – 13 August 2008) was an Italian-Dutch engineer who worked as the Renault Formula One team's Director of Aerodynamics from 2003 until June 2008.

== Career ==
Toso studied automotive design and electronics at Apeldoorn Technical College, followed by a degree in automotive engineering. He then obtained his master's degree in aerodynamics and flight at Cranfield University in the UK. He worked at the Royal Netherlands Aerospace Centre until 1995, when he was recruited by BMW for its GT racing programme. In 1997, he moved to the Jordan F1 team, where he worked as a race engineer. His time at Jordan included its first win at the 1998 Belgian Grand Prix, where he engineered driver Damon Hill's victorious car. For the 2000 season, Toso was Jarno Trulli's race engineer. The pair would later reunite at Renault.

For 2001, Toso followed former Jordan colleague Mike Gascoyne to Benetton, which had been sold to Renault the previous year and was rebranded as such in 2002. At the end of 2003 he replaced the departing John Iley as Chief Aerodynamicist. He oversaw Jarno Trulli's only Grand Prix victory in 2004, before being part of the team that developed the R25 and R26 which won back to back Drivers and Constructors Championships. The team won seventeen Grands Prix during his tenure, fourteen for Fernando Alonso, two for Giancarlo Fisichella and one for Jarno Trulli. In June 2008, Toso stepped down and retired from his role due to ill health.

== Personal life ==
Toso was married to Nathalie, and had a daughter Isabella. Toso was diagnosed with cancer in 2004. He continued to work whilst receiving treatment, but the illness was terminal. He retired in June 2008, dying on August 13, 2008, aged 39, in Oxford. Former colleagues including Flavio Briatore, Eddie Jordan and Damon Hill attended his funeral.
