= Pat Symonds =

British motorsport engineer (born 1953)

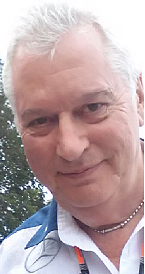
- Symonds in 2015
- Born: Patrick Bruce Reith Symonds; 11 June 1953 (age 73); Bedford, England, United Kingdom
- Education: Masters in Vehicle Dynamics
- Alma mater: Cranfield University; Oxford Polytechnic
- Years active: 1980s–present

Patrick Bruce Reith Symonds (born 11 June 1953) is a British motor racing engineer who is the executive engineering consultant for the Cadillac Formula One team. He was the Chief Technical Officer at Williams Grand Prix Engineering from 2013 until 2016, having previously worked at the Toleman, Benetton, Renault, and Virgin/Marussia Formula One teams. Until May 2024, he was the Chief Technical Officer of Formula One.

Symonds began his career in lower motorsport categories before he joined Toleman in the early 1980s. After a brief move to the abortive Reynard Formula One project with then-chief designer Rory Byrne in 1991, he returned to Benetton. With a career spanning over three decades, Symonds was a key member of Team Enstone (first as Toleman, then as Benetton and Renault), where he led Michael Schumacher and Fernando Alonso to win four World Championships between 1994 and 2006. Overall, teams involving Symonds won four Drivers' titles, three Constructors' titles, and 42 Grands Prix (22 with Benetton and 20 with Renault).

In September 2009, Symonds was forced to resign from the Renault team due to his involvement in Crashgate, a race fixing at the 2008 Singapore Grand Prix. After the Fédération Internationale de l'Automobile (FIA) conducted its own investigation, Symonds was banned from operational roles in F1 for 3 years (although able to act in a consultative role) while Renault's Managing Director Flavio Briatore was banned indefinitely from any events sanctioned by the FIA, although both these bans were later overturned by a French Tribunal de Grande Instance.

== Early life and education ==
Symonds was born in Bedford, England, and educated at Gresham's School in Holt, Norfolk, after which he studied automotive engineering at the Cranfield Institute of Technology at Oxford Polytechnic and Cranfield University's Institute of Technology, where he gained a Masters in vehicle dynamics in 1976.

== Career ==
=== Ford and Toleman ===
Symonds started his automotive career as an undergraduate apprentice with the Ford Motor Company. He joined Hawke, a racing car company, as a designer of Formula Ford racing cars. After two years, he moved to Royale Racing, where he met Rory Byrne, with whom he kept producing Formula Ford racing cars. This lasted until 1979, when Symonds joined Toleman. Under its partnership with Hart Racing Engines, the Toleman proved competitive as Brian Henton and Derek Warwick won four races and finished 1–2 in the 1980 European Formula Two Championship. The next year, Symonds worked on research and development, as the team moved on to Formula One. At the same time, he was also the race engineer of Stefan Johansson in a Formula Two Toleman run by Docking Spitzley Racing. During the following seasons, Symonds became a full-time member of Toleman in Formula One, serving as the race engineer of Warwick and Teo Fabi in 1982, Bruno Giacomelli in 1983, and a rookie Ayrton Senna in 1984.

=== Benetton and Renault ===
As Toleman grew, it was taken over to become Benetton Formula and was subsequently sold and renamed Renault F1. Symonds remained throughout this entire period with the team, working his way through the technical ranks. He served as an engineer for many of the team's drivers, including Alessandro Nannini and Teo Fabi. In 1991, as Benetton hired John Barnard as its technical director, Symonds and Rory Byrne left the team and signed-up with Adrian Reynard to design a Reynard Formula One car. The project ultimately failed and Symonds alongside Byrne returned to Benetton when Barnard fell out with Flavio Briatore. In the mid-1990s, he was Michael Schumacher's race engineer, helping him win two World Championships in 1994 and 1995, while also assuming the role of Head of Research and Development. Symonds remained with Benetton when Schumacher departed to Ferrari in 1996. As Ross Brawn was also lured to Ferrari in 1997, Symonds became Benetton's Technical Director. When Mike Gascoyne joined the team in 2001, Symonds was promoted to executive director of engineering, a post which he retained though the transition to Renault ownership in 2002, even as Gascoyne was replaced by Bob Bell. In 2005 and 2006, as the executive engineer, he led Fernando Alonso to win two World Championships.

=== Crashgate ===
In July 2009, Nelson Piquet Jr. claimed Symonds asked him to deliberately crash at the 2008 Singapore Grand Prix to manufacture a situation that would assist teammate Fernando Alonso to win the race. The ING Renault F1 Team released a statement on 16 September 2009 stating that Symonds was no longer part of the team. Symonds was subsequently suspended from Formula One events for five years after his "acceptance that he took part in the conspiracy" and expressing his "eternal regret and shame" to the FIA World Motor Sport Council. His ban was overturned by the French Tribunal de Grande Instance on 5 January 2010, and he was also paid €5,000 in compensation. In April 2010, he and Briatore reached an out-of-court settlement with the FIA where he could return to Formula One in 2013 but could be a consultant to a Formula One team in the meantime.

=== Virgin/Marussia and Williams ===
In 2011, Symonds returned to Formula One as a consultant for the Virgin Racing (later Marussia F1) team to conduct a thorough overview of its operation, following a disappointing start to its second season in the sport. Shortly afterwards, the team parted company with existing technical director Nick Wirth. Symonds is believed to have effectively taken Wirth's place, although he was still only a consultant due to the terms of his ban. During this time, Symonds also had a column in the F1 Racing magazine. In July 2013, it was announced that Symonds had been appointed as Chief Technical Officer for Williams Racing, replacing Mike Coughlan. Williams confirmed in December 2016 that Symonds would be leaving upon the expiration of his contract at the end of the year. During his time at Williams, the team finished ninth in 2013, third in 2014 and 2015, and fifth in 2016.

=== Formula One Chief Technical Officer ===
In January 2017, Symonds began serving on the committee for the MSc in Motorsport Engineering and Management at Cranfield University. In March 2017, it was announced that Symonds was to join the Sky Sports F1 team. Symonds served as Formula One's Chief Technical Officer from March 2017 until May 2024, playing a key role in the 2022 regulations that led to the return of ground effect racing cars in an attempt to make racing closer, and in part also the 2026 regulations.

=== Cadillac ===
In May 2024, it was publicly announced that Symonds had signed onto Andretti Global's Formula One bid, to be known as Cadillac Formula One team, serving as the executive engineering consultant for its planned entry in 2026.

== Formula One World Championships ==
Season	World Championship		Chassis	Engine	Statistics					
Season	Constructors'	Drivers'	Chassis	Engine	Races	Wins	Poles	F/Laps	Podiums	WCC
1994	Symonds was Head of Research and Development									
1994	—N/a	(Germany) Michael Schumacher	B194	Ford	16	8	6*	8*	12	2nd
1995	(United Kingdom) Benetton	(Germany) Michael Schumacher	B195	Renault	16	11*	4	8*	15*	1st
2005	Symonds was Executive Engineer									
2005	(France) Renault	(Spain) Fernando Alonso	R25	Renault	19	8*	7	3	18	1st
2006	(France) Renault	(Spain) Fernando Alonso	R26	Renault	18	8*	7	5*	19*	1st

Notes

Key: (Bold) personal record; (*) constructor record; (†) Formula One record
