= Bob Bell (motorsport) =

British Formula One technical director (born 1958)

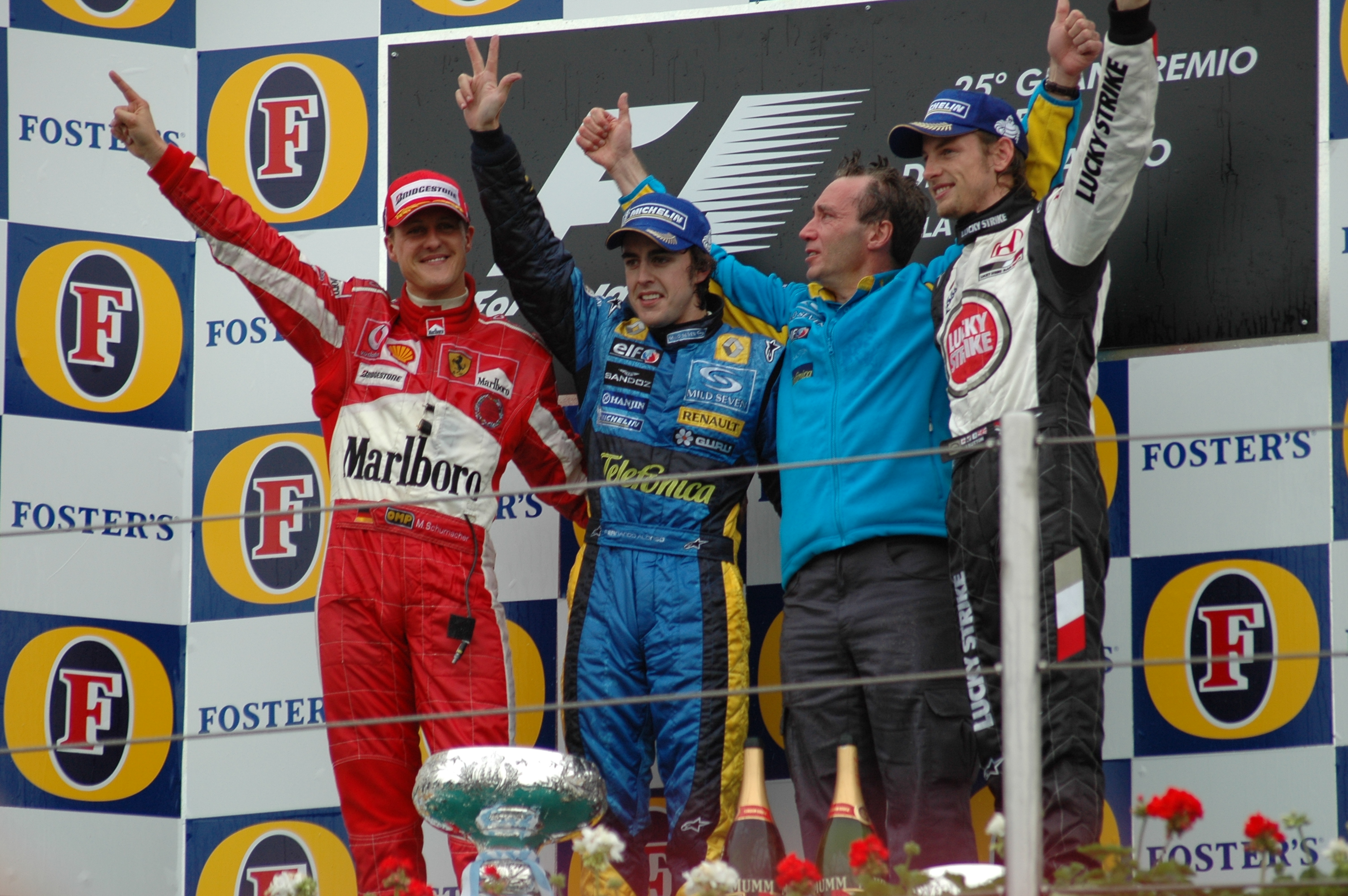
- Bell (third from left) on the podium at the 2005 San Marino Grand Prix
- Born: Robert Charles Bell; 10 April 1958 (age 68); Belfast, Northern Ireland
- Education: Queen's University Belfast
- Occupation: Executive Director - Technical
- Years active: 1982–present
- Employer: Aston Martin F1 Team
- Known for: Formula One aerodynamicist
- Spouse: Nicola Bell
- Children: 2

Robert Charles Bell (born 10 April 1958) is a Formula One engineer and technical director, best known for his work with the Renault Formula One team. He is currently the Executive Director - Technical for the Aston Martin F1 Team.

== Career ==
Bell attended Queen's University in Belfast, gaining a doctorate in Aeronautical Engineering. before joining McLaren in 1982 and worked as the company aerodynamicist until 1988, when he was promoted to head of research and development for the next two years. In 1997, Bell moved to the Benetton Formula team, working there with Nick Wirth.

He worked as the Senior Aerodynamicist at Benetton until 1999, when he went to the Jordan Grand Prix team joining them as the head of vehicle technology, after being invited by his former McLaren colleague Mike Gascoyne. Both left Jordan for Renault F1 and in 2001, Bell was appointed the deputy technical director at the Enstone team, becoming the technical director in 2003 when Mike Gascoyne departed to join the Toyota F1 team.

Bell was Renault F1's technical director during the hugely successful 2005 and 2006 seasons, in which his R25 and R26 won both the Drivers' and the Constructor's championships. The next two seasons saw very few good results, and his projects dropped in the Constructor's championship to fourth place in 2007 and 2008.

After the resignations of Flavio Briatore and Pat Symonds in relation to the Renault Formula One crash controversy, Bell was appointed acting team principal for the rest of 2009, on 23 September 2009. For the 2010 season, Bell held the position of managing director for the Renault team until leaving the team on 6 October 2010. On 18 February 2011, Bell was appointed as the new technical director of Mercedes GP, effective of 1 April 2011. On 14 April 2014, Mercedes announced that Bell had resigned his position in December 2013 and would be leaving the team in November 2014.

Prior to the 2015 Canadian Grand Prix, Manor Marussia announced the recruitment of Bell as technical consultant.

On 3 February 2016, Bell was announced as the chief technical officer at the newly created Renault Sport F1 Team, with the Renault R.S.16 car. He worked at the Renault team for two years, before stepping away from the team in 2018, becoming a part-time advisor. This came after a 36-year career in Formula One.

On 6 March 2024, Bell was announced as Executive Director - Technical of Aston Martin F1 Team.
