= Tad Czapski =

British Formula One engineer

- Born: Tadeusz Czapski; 27 May 1957 (age 69)

Tadeusz Czapski (born 27 May 1957) is a British Formula One engineer.

== Career ==
From childhood, Czapski's passion was electronics. After graduating from school, he became a student of the Electronics Department of Bangor University, where he obtained a bachelor's degree. Then he decided to research a relatively new digital signal processing system, which won him many awards and a master's degree. In the mid-1980s, he worked in Birmingham for the automotive company Lucas Industries mainly on improving fuel injection. After a few years, Czapski founded an electronics design consultancy, and for the next eight years he specialized in electronic control systems in the aerospace industry.

In June 1991, Tom Walkinshaw became chief engineer for Benetton in Formula One. He quickly began searching for a new generation of engineers to meet the new challenges imposed by Benetton in Formula 1. In the fall of 1992, Czapski joined Benetton, working in advanced electronic systems such as active suspension, automatic transmissions, ABS and traction control. Czapski was responsible for the control systems in the Benetton B193 drive train. However, in October 1993, the FIA imposed a ban on the use of any electronic aids.

The 1994 season began with many suspicions that some bands were using electronic systems despite the ban. The dispute reached its peak in August, when the FIA announced that an analysis of Michael Schumacher's Benetton B194 software at the 1994 San Marino Grand Prix showed that it contained a launch control system that exploited the maximum power of the propulsion system and allowed for a fully automated start. This system could be activated from a laptop by selecting the thirteenth option (out of 10 visible on the screen). However, in the absence of evidence of the use of this system, the FIA did not penalize Benetton with the exception of $100,000 due to significant delays in the delivery of the engine management systems.

In 1996, Czapski moved with Schumacher to Scuderia Ferrari, but after winning the title by Schumacher in 2000, Czapski returned to Great Britain, where he resumed working for Benetton. In 2002, he became head of research and development at the Renault F1 team. In 2009, he became an employee of Mercedes GP. Czapski no longer works in Formula One and is currently a trustee at a charity based in Cheltenham.

The monthly F1 Racing described Czapski as "the Polish wizard of electronics". The weekly Auto Świat suggested that the successes of Schumacher or Renault largely depended on Czapski.
