= Tim Densham =

British engineer

- Born: March 31, 1955 (age 70)
- Citizenship: British
- Occupation: Engineer
- Known for: Formula One Engineer
- Title: Former Chief Designer

Tim Densham (born 31 March 1955) is a former British Formula One engineer. He was most recently the chief designer at the Renault Formula One team.

== Biography ==
Densham started his career in motorsport with Team Lotus – the top team at the time – and started working at Ketteringham Hall under Colin Chapman. Densham soon was promoted to the position of race engineer, where he worked with Elio de Angelis in 1984 and Johnny Dumfries the following year. He went on to work with Satoru Nakajima when the team landed Honda engines in 1986. Away from the race tracks, he did a lot of testing work with Ayrton Senna and Nelson Piquet and eventually became assistant chief engineer in charge of Team Lotus research and development department. Team Lotus, however, was plagued with financial issues, so in 1990 Densham decided to move on and found a job with Brabham.

He worked as a designer once again and was the race engineer for Stefano Modena in 1990 and Mark Blundell in 1991. When Sergio Rinland left the team at the end of 1991 Densham was named chief designer for the BT61 project but the team went bankrupt so it closed down in the middle of the season with the new car never having been built. In late 1992 Densham joined Tyrrell as a design engineer. He was soon back on the racing team as race engineer to Andrea de Cesaris, Mark Blundell (again) and Ukyo Katayama, who he engineered in 1995 and 1996.

At the start of 1998, however, Densham decided that he no longer wanted to attend races as he had in the past and moved to the test team. In the mid-season he quietly left Tyrrell and soon afterwards began working at a secret design center in Leatherhead, Surrey, on the Honda F1 car. This was built by Dallara in Italy and ran for the first time in December with Jos Verstappen at the wheel. The death of Harvey Postlethwaite in 1999 resulted in Honda canceling the program and Densham was recruited to be chief designer at Benetton. He led the engineering department which designed the Benetton-Playlife B200 and remained with the team after it was taken over by Renault Sport.

With Renault, Densham designed cars won back to back drivers' and constructors' titles in 2005 and 2006 and were one of the most competitive teams in the mid to late 2000s. In 2011 Densham left Renault and retired from Formula One.
