= Renault R.S.16 =

Formula One racing automobile developed by Renault for 2016 F1 season

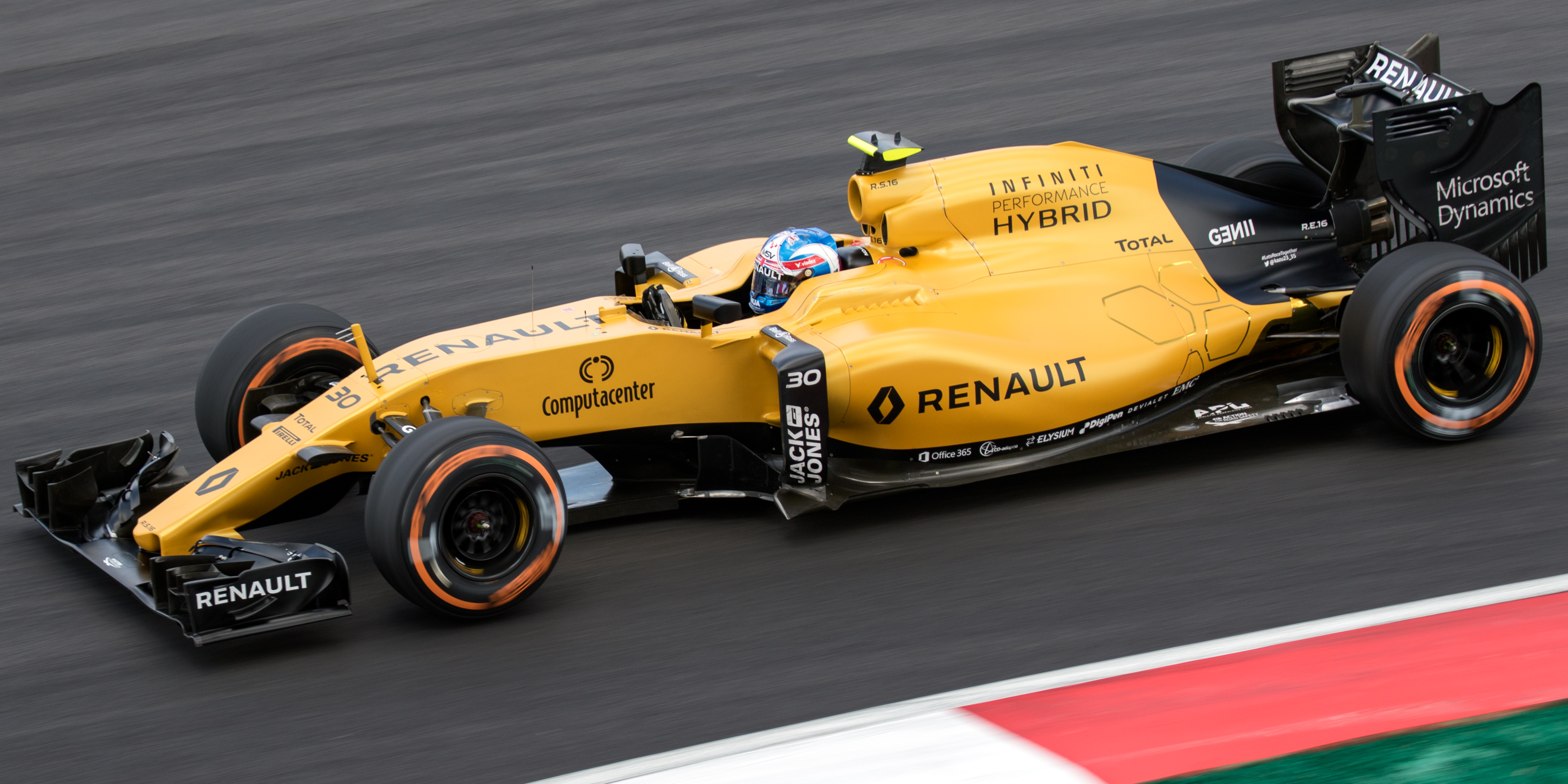
- The Renault R.S.16, driven by Jolyon Palmer, during the Malaysian Grand Prix
- Category: Formula One
- Constructor: Renault
- Designers: Bob Bell (Chief Technical Officer); Nick Chester (Chassis Technical Director); Chris Cooney (Engineering Director); Martin Tolliday (Chief Designer); Simon Virrill (Deputy Chief Designer); Pierre Genon (Head of Performance Systems); Jon Tomlinson (Head of Aerodynamics); Rob White (Engine Technical Director)
- Predecessor: Lotus E23 Hybrid - Lotus Engineering; Renault R31 - Renault branded
- Successor: Renault R.S.17

Technical specifications
- Chassis: Moulded carbon fibre and aluminium honeycomb composite monocoque survival cell
- Suspension (front): Carbon fibre top and bottom wishbones operate an inboard rocker via a pushrod system. This is connected to a torsion bar and Multimatic damper units which are mounted inside the front of the monocoque + aluminum uprights
- Suspension (rear): Carbon fibre top and bottom wishbones with pull rod operated torsion springs and transverse-mounted damper units mounted inside the gearbox casing + aluminum uprights
- Length: 5,088 mm (200 in)
- Width: 1,800 mm (71 in)
- Height: 950 mm (37 in)
- Wheelbase: Over 3,100 mm (122 in)
- Engine: Mecachrome-built and assembled Renault R.E.16 1.6 L (98 cu in) single-turbocharged V6 engine (90°), limited to 15,000 RPM in a mid-mounted, rear-wheel drive layout
- Electric motor: Infiniti kinetic and thermal energy recovery systems
- Transmission: In-house Renault 8-speed + 1 reverse titanium gearbox sequential seamless semi-automatic paddle shift. “Quickshift” system in operation to maximize speed of gearshifts with limited-slip differential
- Weight: 702 kg (1,548 lb) including driver
- Fuel: Total Excellium 102 RON unleaded petrol 94.25% + 5.75% biofuel
- Lubricants: Total Quartz 9000 and Elf HTX 840
- Brakes: Carbon discs with steel calipers
- Tyres: Pirelli P Zero dry slick and Pirelli Cinturato treaded intermediate and wet tyres OZ Racing 12 in × 13 in (305 mm × 330 mm) (front) and 13.7 in × 13 in (348 mm × 330 mm) (rear) aluminum racing wheels
- Clutch: AP Racing electro-hydraulically operated, carbon multi-plate

Competition history
- Notable entrants: Renault Sport F1 Team
- Notable drivers: 20. (Denmark) Kevin Magnussen; 30. (United Kingdom) Jolyon Palmer
- Debut: 2016 Australian Grand Prix
- Last event: 2016 Abu Dhabi Grand Prix
Races	Wins	Podiums	Poles	F/Laps
21	0	0	0	0

The Renault R.S.16 (originally known as Lotus E24 Hybrid) was a Formula One racing car designed by the Renault Sport Formula One Team to compete in the 2016 Formula One season, and marked Renault's return to the sport as a constructor after a five-year absence. The Renault R.S.16 was also the first Renault-badged turbocharged car to compete in the sport since Renault RE60 in 1985 and also first Enstone-based car to utilize the Total fuels and lubricants since Lotus E22 in 2014.

Kevin Magnussen and Jolyon Palmer were the race team drivers, whilst Esteban Ocon was the reserve driver. Pastor Maldonado, originally confirmed as a regular driver, lost his seat shortly before the start of the season because his sponsor PDVSA had run into financial difficulties due to falling oil prices.

== Development ==
=== Technical team ===
The chassis was designed by Nick Chester, Chris Cooney, Martin Tolliday, Pierre Genon and Nicolas Hennel with Bob Bell overseeing the design and production of the car as chief technical officer and Rémi Taffin leading the powertrain design. The car was built in Enstone in Oxfordshire with the engine supplied from Viry-Châtillon in France.

=== Vehicle development ===
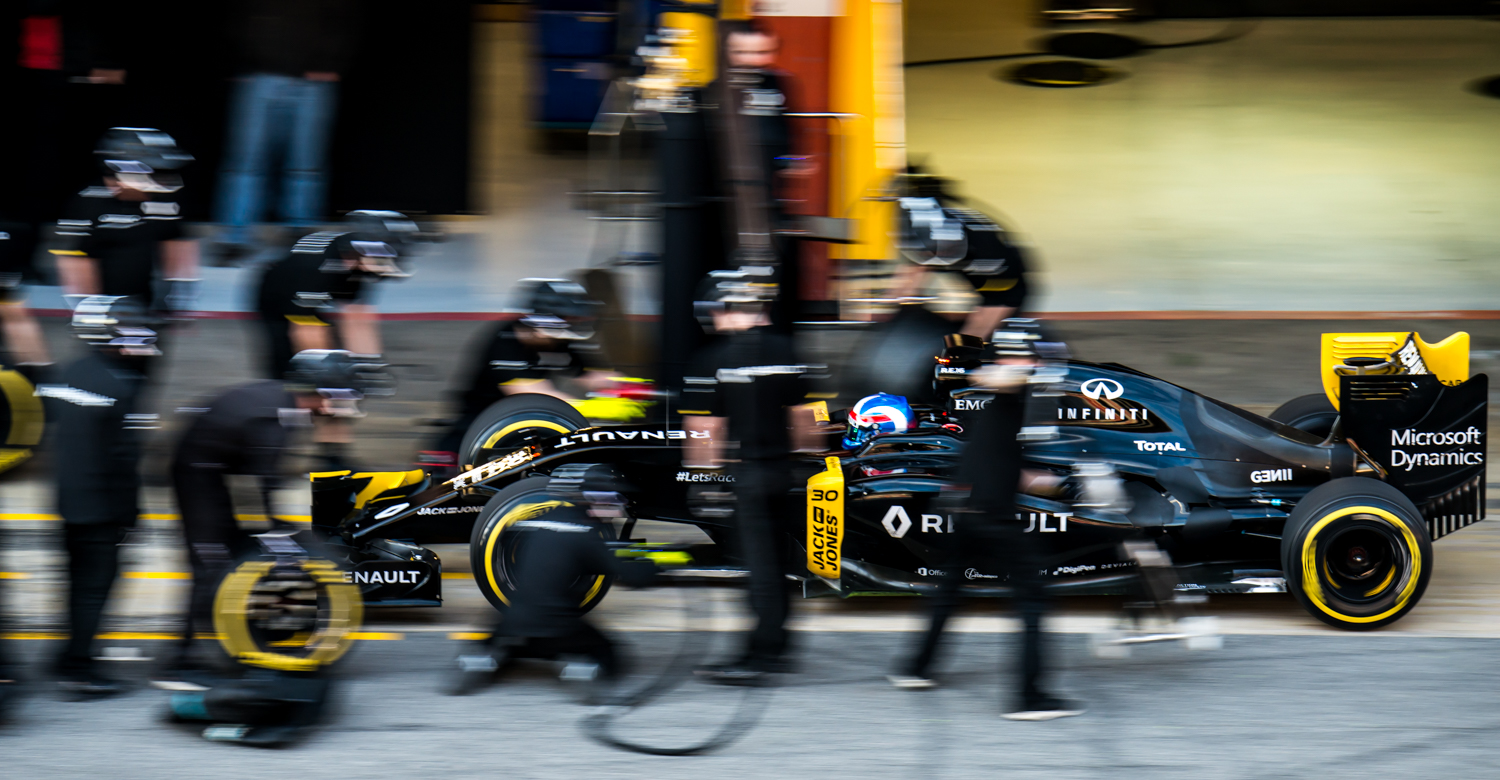
In testing, the R.S. 16 used a black livery that was replaced for the season

Nick Chester admitted that preparations for 2016 were limited by financial difficulty within the Lotus team. They also had a contract to use Mercedes engines for the new season, which meant a significant amount of the car that had been designed needed to be modified to fit the Renault power unit. Ahead of the first round of the season, the team admitted that the R.S. 16 was a developmental and foundational year, using aero similar to the 2015 car and the engine a lightly modified version of the same years model. Many of the early modifications seen in testing were made due to FIA mandated requirements, such as the higher cockpit sides.

The team tested the car in a black livery during testing. At the Barcelona test, the team completed 343 laps or 992 miles. Days one and two were limited with just 79 laps across the two days, however Magnussen managed 260 laps alone in the new car. By the second test, the team completed a total of 776 laps, with Palmer suffering mechanical errors during his test days.

Upon the start of the season, the FIA confirmed Renault had only used 7 of the available 32 tokens for engine development, leaving scope to progress. An upgrade did materialise for the engines at Monaco, where Magnussen took the B-spec unit, and another went to Daniel Ricciardo at Red Bull Racing with the unit branded TAG.

By July, the team abandoned development of the R.S. 16 instead turning focus to the 2017 car.

== Season summary ==
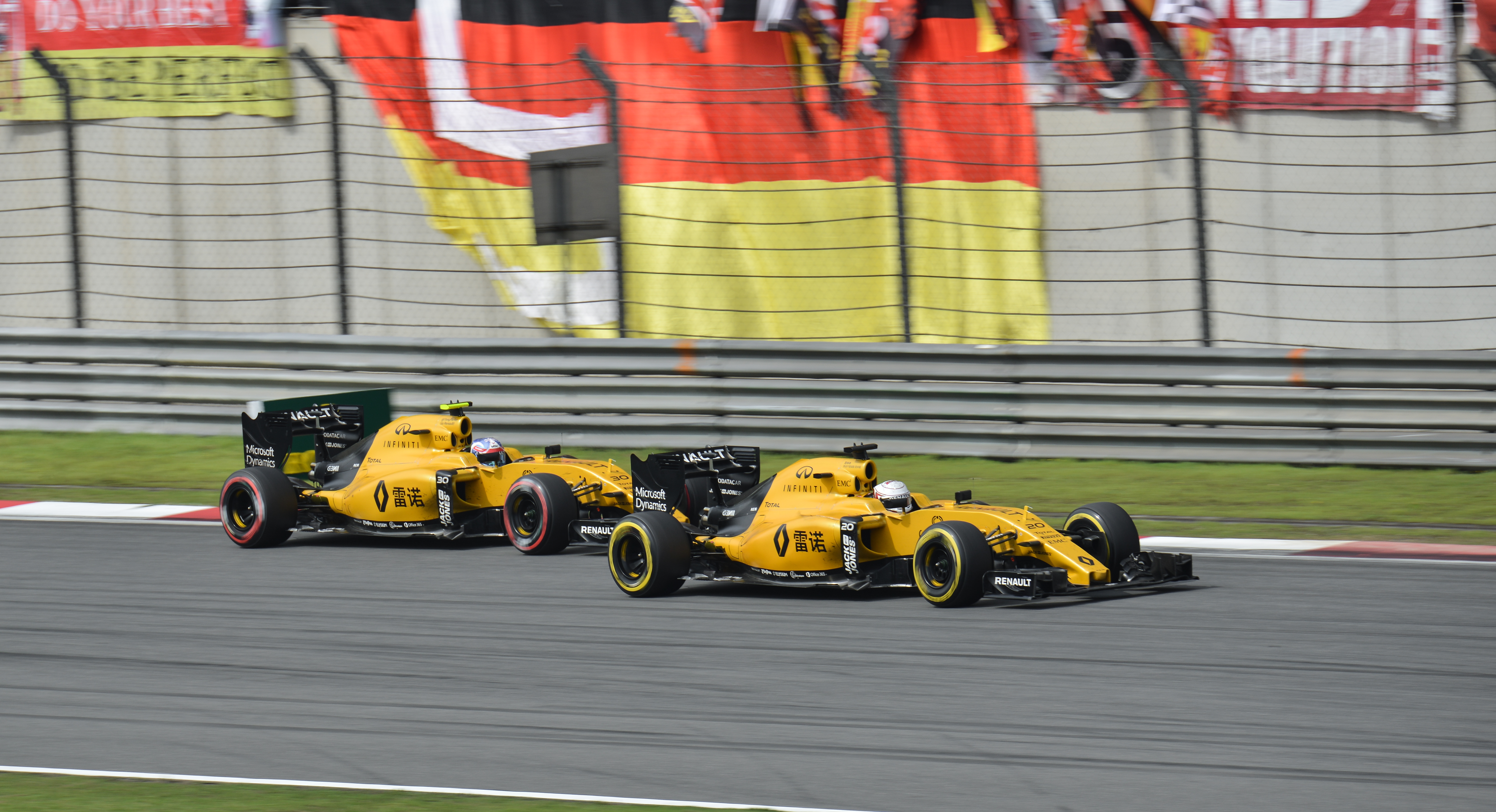
Kevin Magnussen leads teammate Jolyon Palmer during the Chinese Grand Prix

The R.S. 16 was officially launched in Paris, in February 2016.

The R.S. 16 was a poor performer across the season for the team. Retirements were a regular occurrence during the season. In Bahrain, Palmer was unable to start the Grand Prix as his car failed during the formation lap. In Monaco, both cars would retire from the race, Palmer crashed as soon as the safety car allowed the race to begin, while Magnussen was involved in an incident at Rascasse when Daniil Kvyat attempted to unlap himself. Magnussen would retire at three more Grand Prix - Belgium, Malaysia and Abu Dhabi. Meanwhile, his team mate Palmer chalked up another four retirements before the end of the season in Canada, Britain, Singapore and Brazil. This meant that across the 21 races, at 9 rounds at least one R.S. 16 did not make the finish.

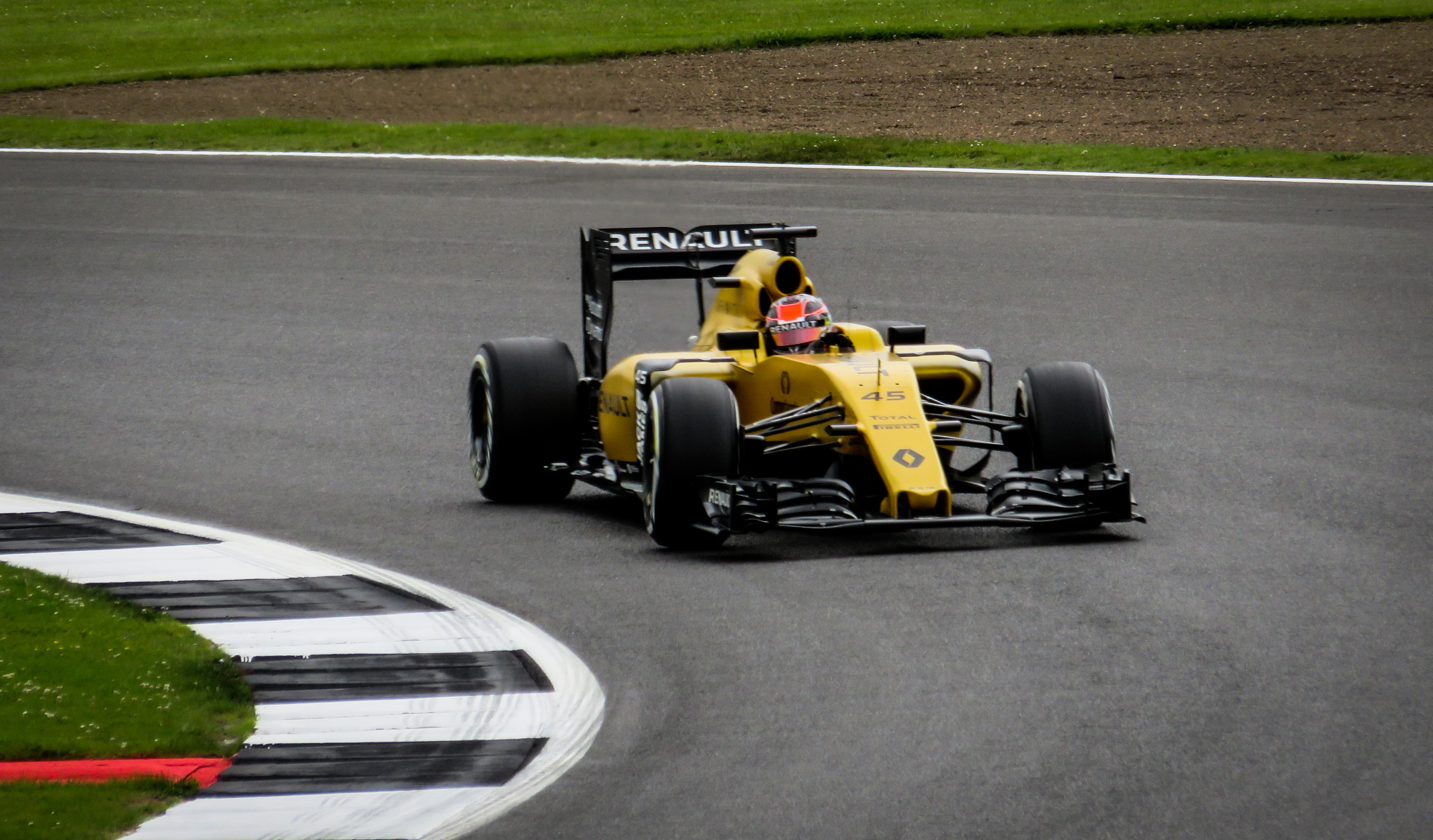
Reserve driver Esteban Ocon driving the R.S.16 during the FP1 of the British Grand Prix

The team scored points at three races, a seventh place finish in Russia for Magnussen being the cars best finish. He would score a further point in Singapore, and Palmer a point at Malaysia - his first in F1.

Scoring just 8 points during the season, it represented the team's worst performance since 2014, and for Renault as a constructor since 1978.

== Sponsorship and livery ==
The R.S.16 was painted black with small yellow accents for the presentation and pre-season testing. In addition to large Renault sponsor stickers, the car featured white logos for Infiniti, Microsoft Dynamics, Jack & Jones, Total and EMC Corporation. Genii Capital, the team's previous owner and now shareholder, also advertised its logo on the upper strut of the front suspension and the engine cover.

== Complete Formula One results ==
(key) (results in bold indicate pole position; results in italics indicate fastest lap)

Year	Entrant	Engine	Tyres	Drivers	1	2	3	4	5	6	7	8	9	10	11	12	13	14	15	16	17	18	19	20	21	Points	WCC
2016	Renault Sport F1 Team	Renault RE16 1.6 V6t	**P**		AUS	BHR	CHN	RUS	ESP	MON	CAN	EUR	AUT	GBR	HUN	GER	BEL	ITA	SIN	MAL	JPN	USA	MEX	BRA	ABU	**8**	**9th**
2016	Renault Sport F1 Team	Renault RE16 1.6 V6t	**P**	Kevin Magnussen	12	11	17	7	15	Ret	16	14	14	17†	15	16	Ret	17	10	Ret	14	12	17	14	Ret	**8**	**9th**
2016	Renault Sport F1 Team	Renault RE16 1.6 V6t	**P**	Jolyon Palmer	11	DNS	22	13	13	Ret	Ret	15	12	Ret	12	19	15	Ret	15	10	12	13	14	Ret	17	**8**	**9th**

† – Driver did not finish the Grand Prix, but were classified as they completed more than 90% of the race distance.

== Renault Clio R.S. 16 ==
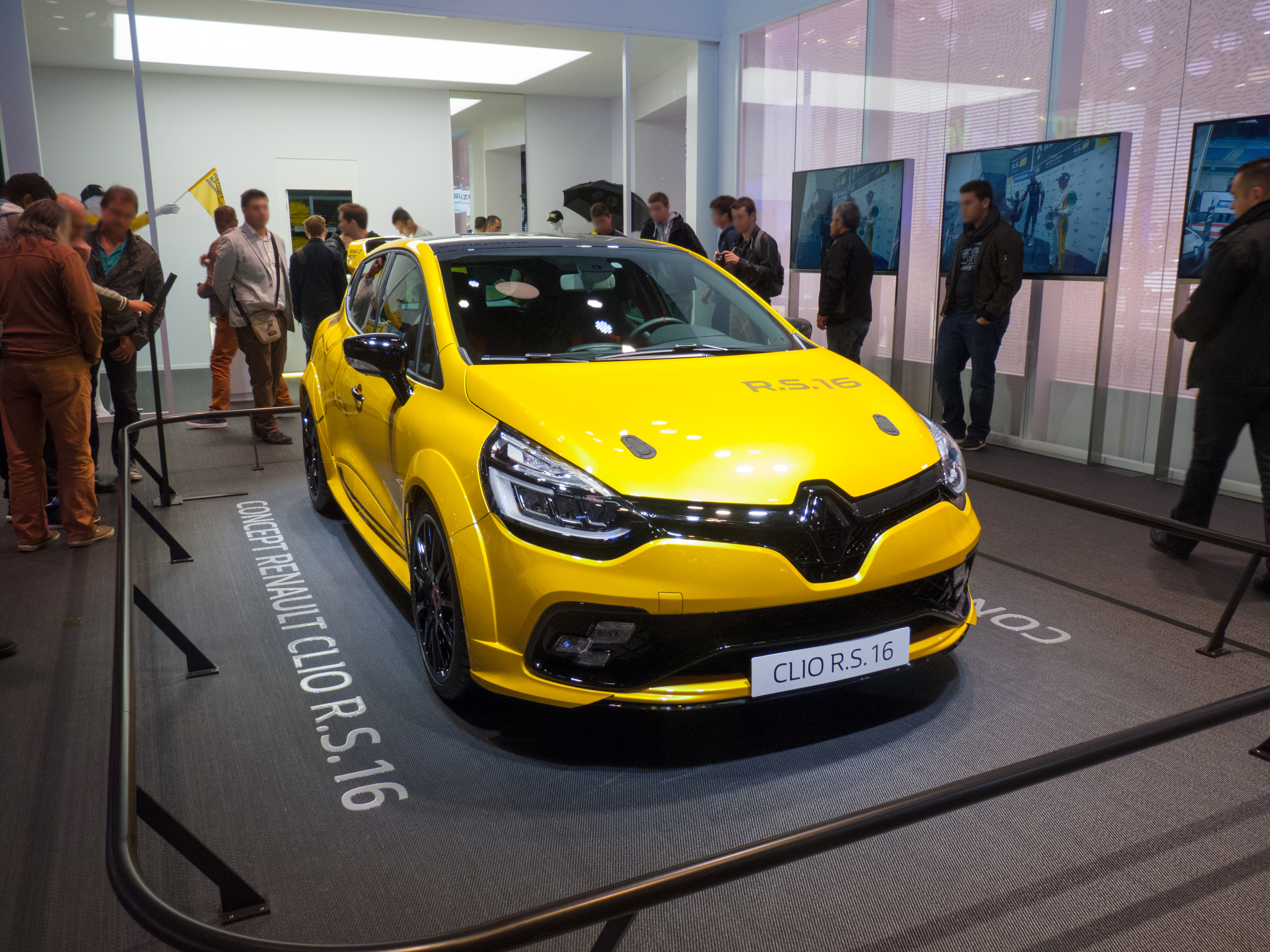
Renault Clio R.S. 16 developed and inspired by the return to Formula One

During the season, Renault's developed a Clio R.S. 16 to commemorate the 40th anniversary of Renault Sport and their return to Formula One. The concept car was painted in the same colours as the R.S.16 Formula One car, and the promotional launch of the car featured Kevin Magnussen driving it at Monaco. The car also featured at the 2016 Goodwood Festival of Speed.
