= Lotus E23 Hybrid =

Formula One racing car

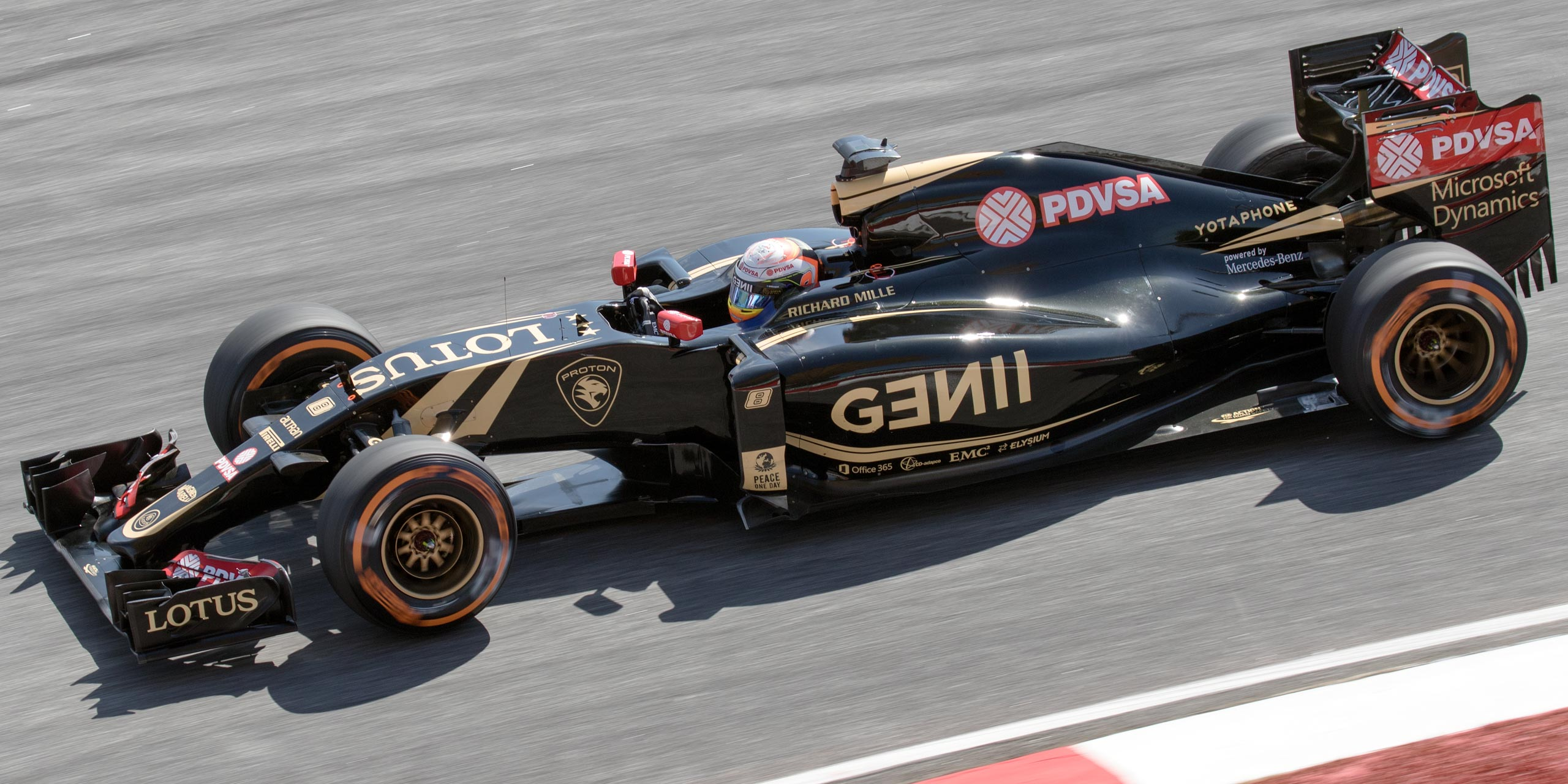
- Romain Grosjean driving the E23 Hybrid at the Malaysian Grand Prix
- Category: Formula One
- Constructor: Lotus
- Designers: Nick Chester (Technical Director); Chris Cooney (Engineering Director); Martin Tolliday (Chief Designer); Simon Virrill (Deputy Chief Designer); Pierre Genon (Head of Performance Systems); Nicolas Hennel (Head of Aerodynamics); Jon Tomlinson (Chief Aerodynamicist)
- Predecessor: Lotus E22
- Successor: Renault R.S.16

Technical specifications
- Engine: Mercedes PU106B Hybrid Turbo 1.6 L (98 cu in) V6 engine (90°), limited to 15,000 RPM in a mid-mounted, rear-wheel drive layout
- Electric motor: Mercedes PU106B Hybrid Motor Generator Unit–Kinetic (MGU-K) Mercedes PU106B Hybrid Motor Generator Unit–Heat (MGU-H)
- Transmission: Semi-automatic, sequential 8 forward gears, 1 reverse gear
- Power: 930 hp (690 kW)
- Weight: 702 kg (1,548 lb)
- Fuel: Petronas
- Lubricants: Petronas
- Tyres: Pirelli P Zero (dry), Cinturato (wet)

Competition history
- Notable entrants: Lotus F1 Team
- Notable drivers: 8. (France) Romain Grosjean; 13. (Venezuela) Pastor Maldonado
- Debut: 2015 Australian Grand Prix
- Last event: 2015 Abu Dhabi Grand Prix
Races	Wins	Podiums	Poles	F/Laps
19	0	1	0	0

The Lotus E23 Hybrid, commonly abbreviated as the Lotus E23, is a Formula One racing car which Lotus used to compete in the 2015 Formula One season. The chassis was designed by Nick Chester, Chris Cooney, Martin Tolliday, Pierre Genon and Nicolas Hennel with Mercedes supplying the team's powertrain. It was driven by Romain Grosjean and Pastor Maldonado. Images of the 2015 car were released on 26 January 2015. The E23 Hybrid attained one podium with Grosjean at the Belgian Grand Prix, which would be the last with the Lotus name, and finished sixth in the Constructors' Championship.

At the time of its competitive debut at the Australian Grand Prix, where it scored a double retirement, the E23 Hybrid was the Enstone team's only car to use Mercedes engine after a 20-year period of racing with Renault based powerplants. The E23 Hybrid was also the first Enstone-based car not to use a Renault-based engine (including the period between 1998 and 2000 where the team used Playlife badged Renault-based Mecachrome/Supertec V10s) since the Ford-powered V8 powered Benetton B194 in 1994, as well as first full British team to utilize Petronas fuel and lubricants. The Lotus-Mercedes partnership was originally intended to last for six years (until 2020), but was terminated five years earlier as the team returned to Renault power unit after a single season and thus bought ill-fated Lotus stake from 2016 onwards and renamed back to Renault Sport Formula One Team. The Renault works partnership was terminated following the conclusion of the 2025 season following poor results with the power unit, and the Enstone based team, rebranded to Alpine since 2021, returned to customer Mercedes power units for the 2026 Formula One World Championship.

== Season summary ==
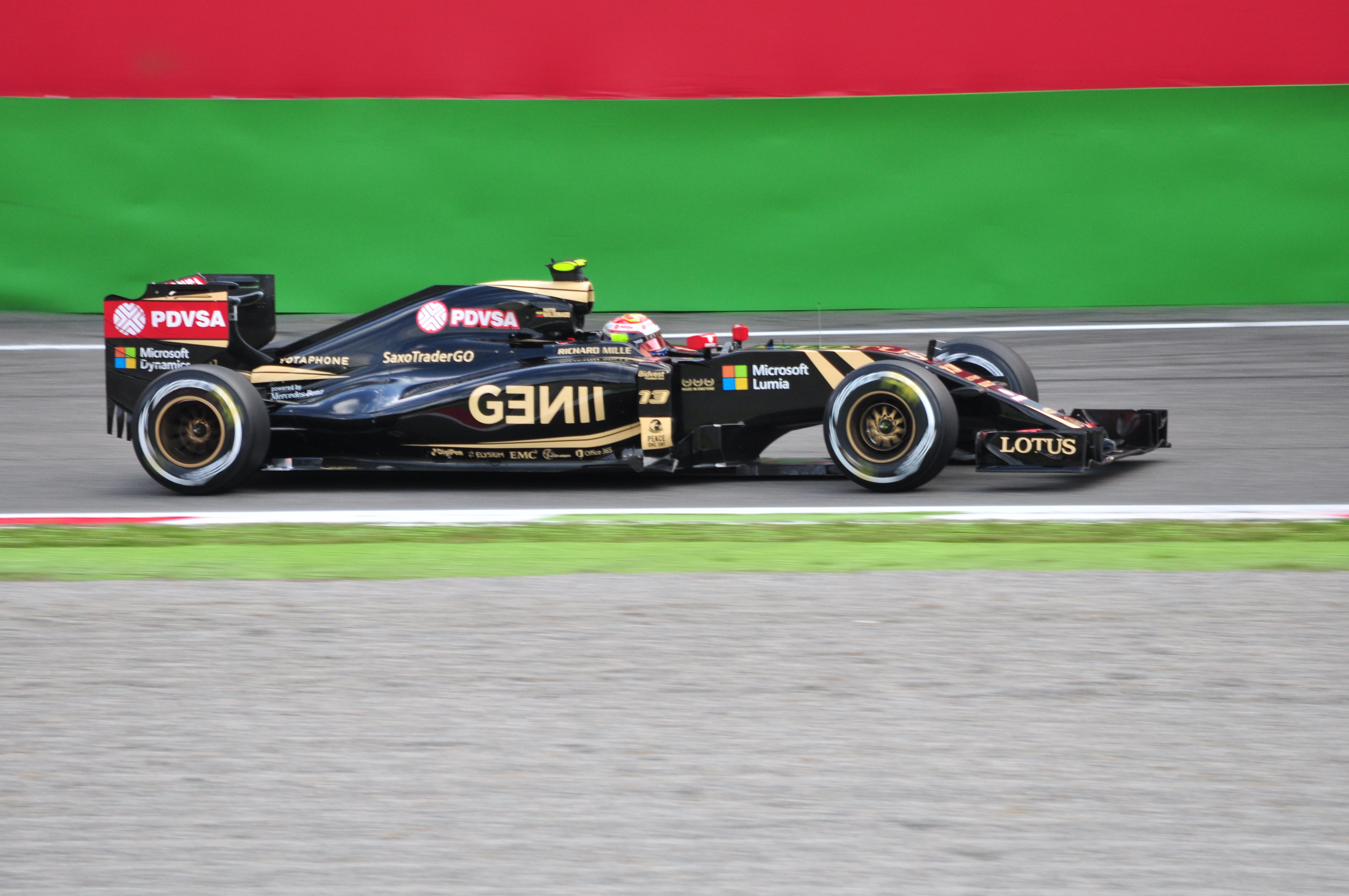
Maldonado at the Italian Grand Prix.

After the team's dramatic slump in 2014, the 2015 season marked a small improvement in form. The car was considered an improvement compared to the disastrous Lotus E22, which suffered from reliability issues and struggling for competitiveness due to the underpowered and unreliable Renault power unit and the fundamental flaws of the E22 chassis. However, both driver errors and unreliability cost the team points finishes in many races, limiting the car's potential of consistent points scoring. Maldonado retired in 5 out of the first 6 races either due to collisions or car problems. Grosjean and Maldonado collided with each other, in Spain and Britain. A highlight of the season however was Grosjean's podium finish in Belgium. Lotus ended its last season with 78 points and a 6th place in the World Constructors' Championship, before its buyout from Renault Sport.

== Sponsorship and livery ==
The livery was completely changed with a new gold graphics design and the red accents were mostly removed while retaining the triple stars (signifying Team Enstone's three Constructors' Championships) behind the cockpit. The team had lost the Rexona sponsorship as Unilever switched into Williams. This was the final year for the following sponsors: Yotaphone, Saxo Bank, PDVSA and Proton.

The team promoted the movie Mad Max: Fury Road at the Spanish Grand Prix. The team sponsored Pharrell Williams' recording label I Am Other in Monaco. The team paid tribute to Jules Bianchi in Hungary, with "#JB17" present on the engine cover . At Singapore, Lotus celebrated the launch of the Forza Motorsport 6 and to celebrate, drivers wore green Xbox overalls.

== Complete Formula One results ==
(key) (results in bold indicate pole position; results in italics indicate fastest lap)

Year	Entrant	Engine	Tyres	Drivers	Grands Prix																			Points	WCC
Year	Entrant	Engine	Tyres	Drivers	AUS	MAL	CHN	BHR	ESP	MON	CAN	AUT	GBR	HUN	BEL	ITA	SIN	JPN	RUS	USA	MEX	BRA	ABU	Points	WCC
2015	Lotus F1	Mercedes PU106B Hybrid	**P**	(France) Romain Grosjean	Ret	11	7	7	8	12	10	Ret	Ret	7	3	Ret	13^{†}	7	Ret	Ret	10	8	9	78	6th
2015	Lotus F1	Mercedes PU106B Hybrid	**P**	(Venezuela) Pastor Maldonado	Ret	Ret	Ret	15	Ret	Ret	7	7	Ret	14	Ret	Ret	12	8	7	8	11	10	Ret	78	6th

^{†} Driver failed to finish the race, but was classified as they had completed greater than 90% of the race distance.
