= Lotus E22 =

Formula One racing car

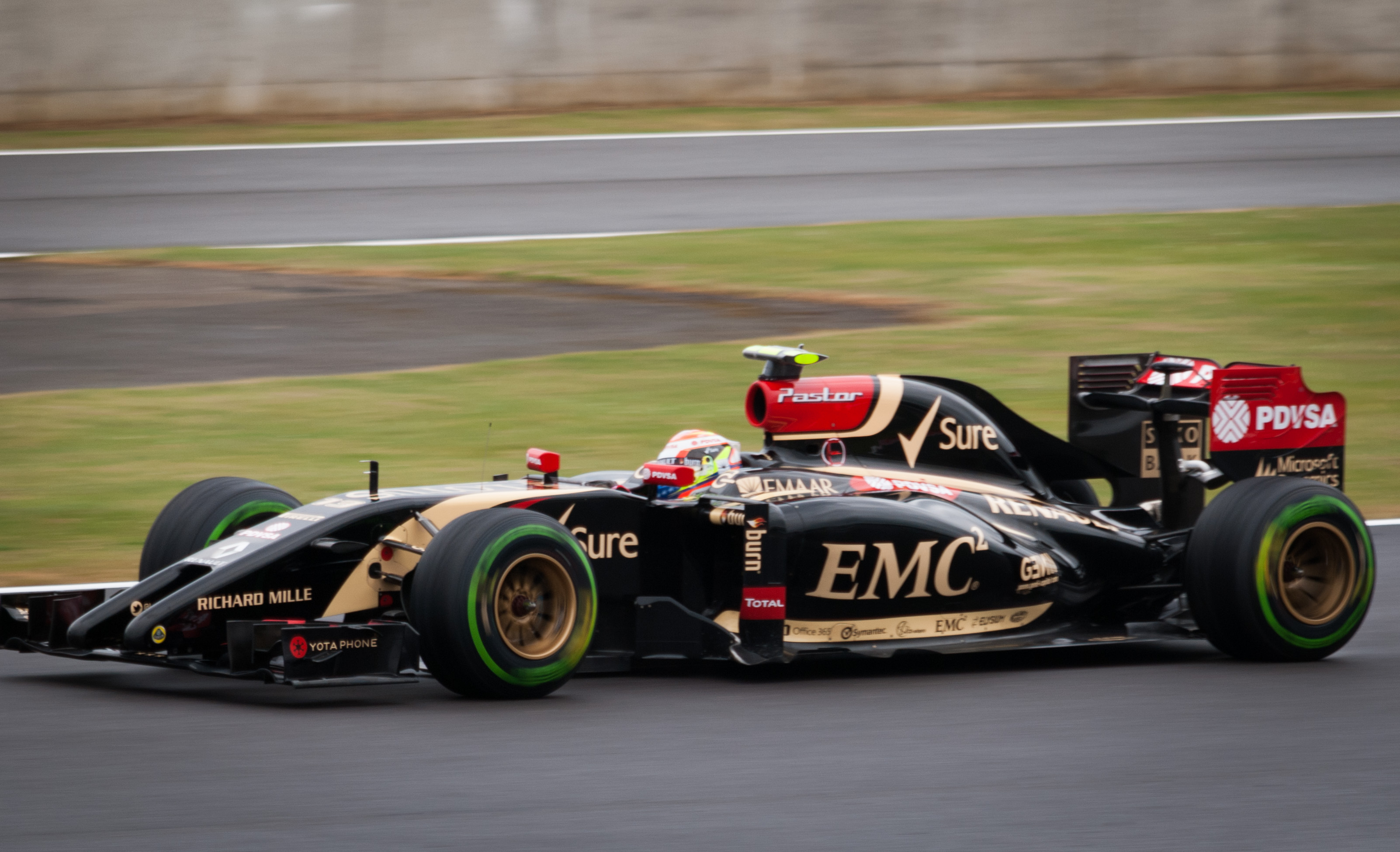
- Pastor Maldonado driving the E22 at the British Grand Prix
- Category: Formula One
- Constructor: Lotus
- Designers: Nick Chester (Technical Director); Chris Cooney (Engineering Director); Martin Tolliday (Chief Designer); Simon Virrill (Deputy Chief Designer); Daniele Casanova (Head of Performance Systems); Nicolas Hennel (Head of Aerodynamics); Jon Tomlinson (Chief Aerodynamicist)
- Predecessor: Lotus E21
- Successor: Lotus E23 Hybrid

Technical specifications
- Chassis: Composite monocoque structure, designed and built in-house, carrying the Renault V6 as fully stressed member
- Suspension (front): Carbon fibre top and bottom wishbones operate an inboard rocker via a pushrod system. This is connected to a torsion bar and damper units which are mounted inside the front of the monocoque. Aluminium uprights
- Suspension (rear): Carbon fibre top and bottom wishbones with pull rod operated torsion springs and transverse-mounted damper units mounted inside the gearbox casing. Aluminium uprights
- Engine: Renault Energy F1-2014 1.6 L (98 cu in) V6, turbo
- Transmission: Lotus 8-speed semi-automatic titanium gearbox with reverse gear.
- Weight: 692kg, with driver, cameras and ballast
- Fuel: Total Excellium
- Lubricants: Total Quartz 9000
- Tyres: Pirelli P Zero (dry), Cinturato (wet)

Competition history
- Notable entrants: Lotus F1 Team
- Notable drivers: 8. (France) Romain Grosjean; 13. (Venezuela) Pastor Maldonado
- Debut: 2014 Australian Grand Prix
- Last event: 2014 Abu Dhabi Grand Prix
Races	Wins	Podiums	Poles	F/Laps
19	0	0	0	0

The Lotus E22 is a Formula One racing car designed by Lotus to compete in the 2014 Formula One season. It was driven by Romain Grosjean and Pastor Maldonado, who replaced Kimi Räikkönen after Räikkönen left the team to rejoin Ferrari.

This was the last car of the Enstone-based team which used Renault engines until Renault RS16, before a new one-year deal with fellow Daimler brand Mercedes.

== Design ==
The chassis was designed by Nick Chester, Chris Cooney, Martin Tolliday, Daniele Casanova and Nicolas Hennel with Renault supplying the team's powertrain. The E22 was designed to use Renault's new 1.6-litre V6 turbocharged engine, the Energy F1-2014.

The E22 had a "tusk" style nosecone design; with a short tusk on the left side and longer tusk on the right side.

== Season summary ==
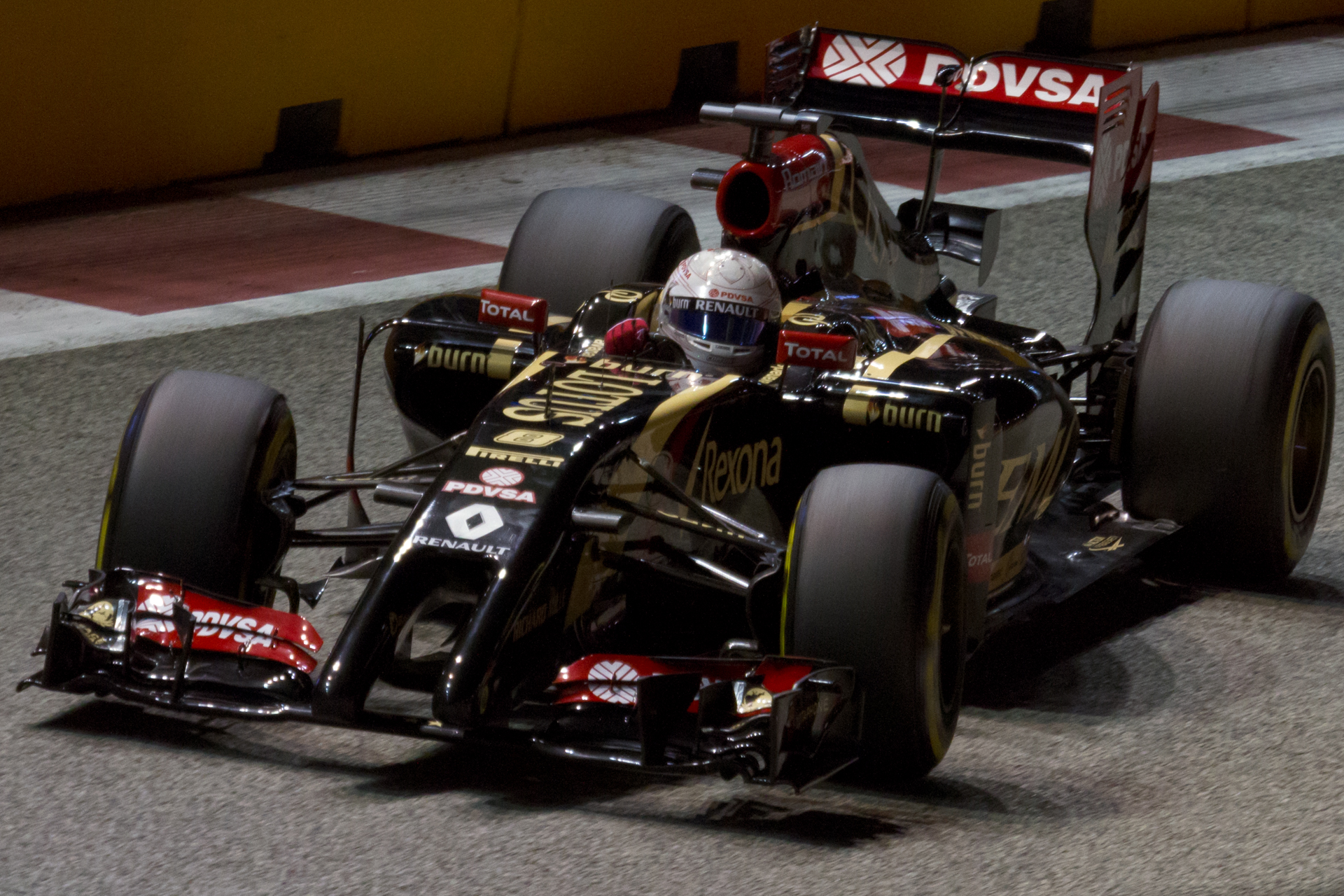
Grosjean at the Singapore Grand Prix

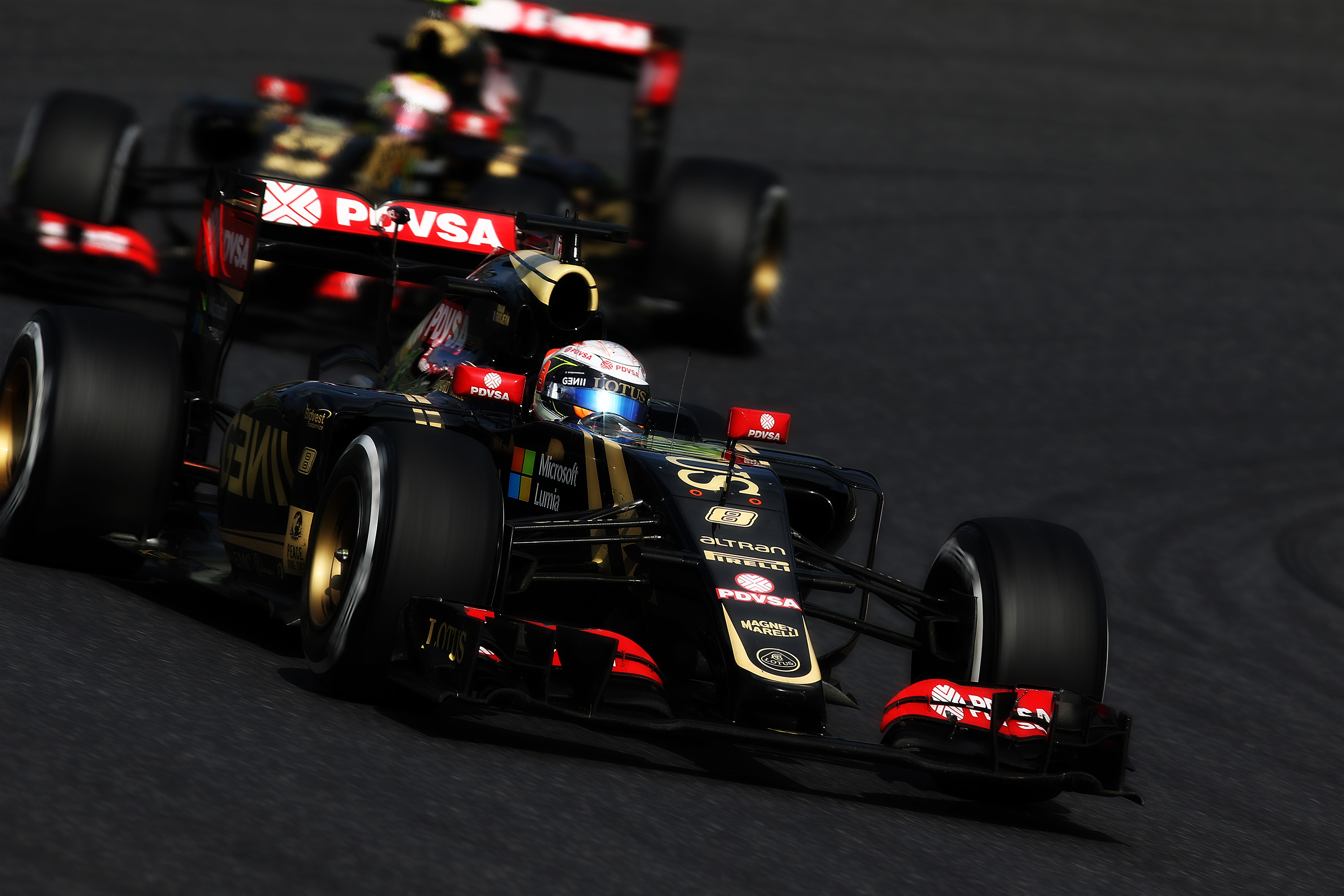
The Lotus E23 nose design

The team was forced to miss the first pre-season test at Jerez de la Frontera, but released computer-rendered images of the car in the week beforehand, showing a distinctive asymmetrical forked nose design.

The testing phase was extremely problematic, partly due to the initial lack of reliability and power from the Renault power unit. The car arrived in Melbourne the site of the season opening Grand Prix with very little mileage under its belt, a factor that significantly compromised its performance. In qualifying, Grosjean managed to stay within the 107% time limit by just two tenths of a second, while Maldonado failed to set a timed lap, though he was still permitted to start the race. Both drivers were forced to retire from the race due to technical issues.

Slight improvements were seen in the subsequent races: in Malaysia, Grosjean managed to complete the race, albeit in eleventh place, while in Bahrain, both drivers reached the finish line, though outside the points scoring positions. At the Chinese Grand Prix, Grosjean qualified in the top ten for the first time, but was let down by his gearbox.

The first points of the season were secured at the Spanish Grand Prix, where Grosjean finished eighth after starting from fifth on the grid. Lotus nevertheless struggled to earn points throughout the season, with only two more point scoring finishes at Monaco for Grosjean and in the United States for Maldonado. The team would admit that a fundamental design flaw on the chassis was hugely responsible for the poor performance during the season.

Also in the United States the team tried a different nose design in FP1 similar to the E23 but then they stopped the development of the car relatively early to concentrate on the E23 chassis after developments on the troublesome car brought no improvements to its performance. Therefore, Lotus ended the season a disappointing eighth in the Constructors' Championship standings, compared to fourth in 2013 and ended up no podiums for the first time since 2002 season when it was named Renault.

== Sponsorship and livery ==
The car features the same livery as the previous season: black and gold with red accents. In terms of sponsorship, the signing of Maldonado brought the backing of the Venezuelan oil group PDVSA. Thanks to sponsors Total, PDVSA, and Genii Capital, the car also featured red colour accents. Additional sponsor decals came from Rexona and Clear brands belonging to the Unilever Group—as well as the energy drink Burn and YotaPhone.

At the Malaysian Grand Prix, logos of the Malaysian car manufacturer Proton could be seen on the sides of the cars. At the Chinese Grand Prix, Renault changed its logo on the sides of the cars to its Chinese version, which features Mandarin characters 雷诺.

At the Spanish Grand Prix, a logo appeared on the sides of the cars to mark the 400th anniversary of the death of the Spanish Renaissance painter El Greco. Interwetten will appear on the sides of the cars at the German and Hungarian Grands Prix.

The Hisense logo showing on the prominent sidepod placement of the at both Italian and the United States races, before moving to the air box for the Abu Dhabi Grand Prix.

== Complete Formula One results ==
(key)

Year	Entrant	Engine	Tyres	Drivers	Grands Prix																			Points	WCC
Year	Entrant	Engine	Tyres	Drivers	AUS	MAL	BHR	CHN	ESP	MON	CAN	AUT	GBR	GER	HUN	BEL	ITA	SIN	JPN	RUS	USA	BRA	ABU‡	Points	WCC
2014	Lotus F1 Team	Renault Energy F1-2014	P	Romain Grosjean	Ret	11	12	Ret	8	8	Ret	14	12	Ret	Ret	Ret	16	13	15	17	11	17^{†}	13	10	8th
2014	Lotus F1 Team	Renault Energy F1-2014	P	Pastor Maldonado	Ret	Ret	14	14	15	DNS	Ret	12	17^{†}	12	13	Ret	14	12	16	18	9	12	Ret	10	8th

† — Driver failed to finish the race, but was classified as they had completed greater than 90% of the race distance.
‡ — Teams and drivers scored double points at the Abu Dhabi Grand Prix.
