= Renault R.S.18 =

2018 Formula One racing car

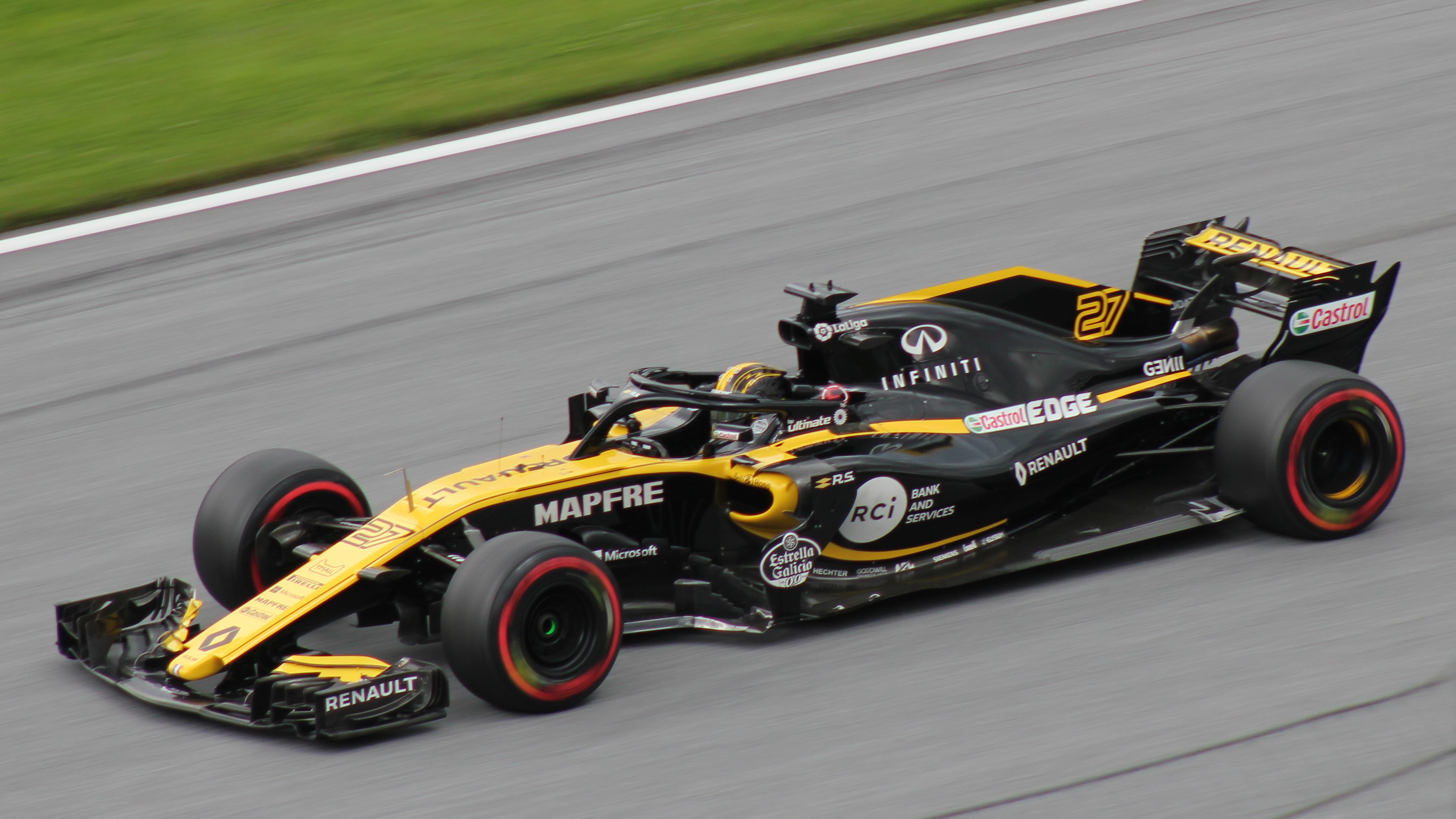
- The R.S.18, driven by Nico Hülkenberg, during the Austrian Grand Prix
- Category: Formula One
- Constructor: Renault
- Designers: Bob Bell (Chief Technical Officer); Naoki Tokunaga (Chief Transformation Officer); Nick Chester (Chassis Technical Director); Chris Cooney (Engineering Director); Martin Tolliday (Chief Designer); Simon Virrill (Deputy Chief Designer); Pierre Genon (Head of Performance Systems); Peter Machin (Head of Aerodynamics); Rémi Taffin (Engine Technical Director)
- Predecessor: Renault R.S.17
- Successor: Renault R.S.19

Technical specifications
- Chassis: Moulded carbon fibre and aluminium honeycomb composite monocoque
- Suspension (front): Carbon fibre top and bottom wishbones operate an inboard rocker via a pushrod system
- Suspension (rear): Carbon fibre top and bottom wishbones with pull rod operated torsion bars
- Length: 5,480 mm (215.7 in)
- Width: 2,000 mm (78.7 in)
- Height: 950 mm (37.4 in)
- Axle track: Front: 1,600 mm (63.0 in); Rear: 1,550 mm (61.0 in)
- Engine: Mecachrome-built and assembled Renault R.E.18 1.6 L (98 cu in) direct injection V6 turbocharged engine limited to 15,000 RPM in a mid-mounted, rear-wheel drive layout
- Electric motor: Renault kinetic and thermal energy recovery systems
- Transmission: Renault eight-speed semi-automatic sequential titanium gearbox + 1 reverse gear
- Battery: Infiniti lithium-ion
- Weight: 733 kg (1,616.0 lb)
- Fuel: BP Ultimate
- Lubricants: Castrol Edge
- Brakes: Carbon discs and pads with Brembo calipers and AP Racing cylinders
- Tyres: Pirelli P Zero (dry); Pirelli Cinturato (intermediate and wet); OZ forged magnesium wheels: 13"
- Clutch: AP Racing electro-hydraulically operated, carbon multi-plate

Competition history
- Notable entrants: Renault Sport F1 Team
- Notable drivers: 27. (Germany) Nico Hülkenberg; 55. (Spain) Carlos Sainz Jr.
- Debut: 2018 Australian Grand Prix
- Last event: 2018 Abu Dhabi Grand Prix
Races	Wins	Podiums	Poles	F/Laps
21	0	0	0	0

The Renault R.S.18 is a Formula One racing car designed and constructed by the Renault Sport Formula One Team to compete during the 2018 FIA Formula One World Championship. The chassis was designed by Nick Chester, Chris Cooney, Martin Tolliday, Pierre Genon and Pete Machin with Bob Bell overseeing the design and production of the car as a chief technical officer and Rémi Taffin leading the powertrain design. The car was driven by Nico Hülkenberg and Carlos Sainz Jr. The car made its competitive debut at the 2018 Australian Grand Prix.

== Design and development ==
Following Renault's return to the sport as a constructor in 2016, the team underwent a recruitment drive and began investing in its Enstone facilities. With the development of the R.S.18, the Enstone factory was expanded to accommodate the team's operations.

== Competition history ==
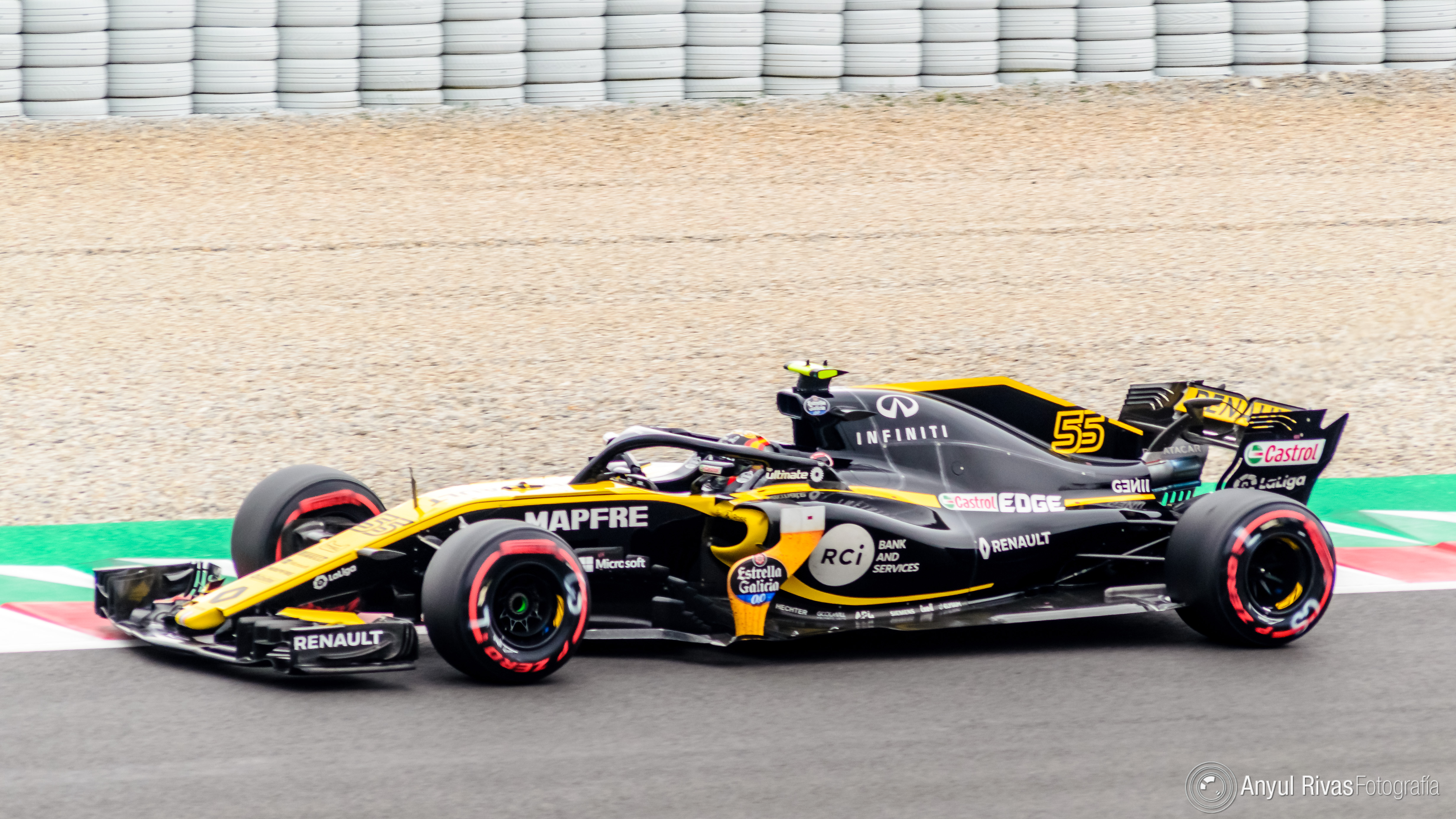
Sainz racing in front of the home crowd at the Spanish Grand Prix, he would go on to finish seventh

The debut in Australia was positive for the R.S.18 with the two cars qualifying in Q3 and a seventh and tenth-place finish scored respectively by Hülkenberg and Sainz in the race, despite an attack of nausea due to a failure of the watering system that occurred to the latter in the final stages of the race. The good impressions of the first race were confirmed in Bahrain where the German driver obtained a sixth place while Sainz narrowly missed out on finishing in the points, finishing eleventh. At the Chinese Grand Prix, both cars in the series managed to score points, with Hülkenberg finishing sixth and Sainz ninth.

Also in Azerbaijan, Renault proved to be competitive starting from qualifying, placing both drivers in Q3 for the fourth consecutive time in four races. In the first laps of the race, the two French cars showed good speed on the long straight, making several overtaking moves against the two Red Bulls, which took Sainz to fourth position and Hulk to fifth. However, on the tenth lap the German driver's race ended when he touched a wall with his right rear tire, destroying the suspension. After a "crazy" race and also thanks to the retirement of the two Red Bulls, Sainz finished the race fifth.

In qualifying for the Spanish Grand Prix, Hülkenberg is the victim of a fuel problem, which becomes apparent in his first attempt. The German driver returns to the track in the final moments of the session, taking the sixteenth time that eliminates him from qualifying. Sainz instead ends his qualifying in ninth place. At the start, Romain Grosjean goes off the track, tries to get the car back but finds himself in the middle of the track, after having raised a large cloud of smoke thus hitting several drivers including the German Renault driver who is forced to retire. The Spanish driver of the instead finishes the home Grand Prix in seventh place. Thanks to this result, Renault overtakes McLaren in the Constructors' World Championship. In Monaco, Canada and France the two Renaults always manage to score points.

The R.S.18 proved to be a vast improvement compared to its predecessor. By the end of the season, Renault finished 4th in the constructors' championship as "the best of the rest" with 122 points.

== Sponsorship and livery ==
The R.S.18 sported a black and yellow livery, the yellow tone was brighter than the previous year. Sainz' personal sponsor, Estrella Galicia was present on the sidepods. The team also sponsored by La Liga football league.

At the British Grand Prix, the car ran with a special livery to promote the new film, Incredibles 2. The red and yellow stripes were decorated across the fin.

== Later use ==
In 2021, Fernando Alonso drove the R.S.18 in Alpine A521 livery at the Circuit de la Sarthe. Later in the same year, a modified R.S.18 was used during testing of the 2022 tyre compounds after the Abu Dhabi Grand Prix.

== Complete Formula One results ==
(key) (results in bold indicate pole position; results in italics indicate fastest lap)

Year	Entrant	Engine	Tyres	Drivers	Grands Prix																					Points	WCC
Year	Entrant	Engine	Tyres	Drivers	AUS	BHR	CHN	AZE	ESP	MON	CAN	FRA	AUT	GBR	GER	HUN	BEL	ITA	SIN	RUS	JPN	USA	MEX	BRA	ABU	Points	WCC
2018	Renault Sport Formula One Team	Renault R.E.18	**P**	Hülkenberg	7	6	6	Ret	Ret	8	7	9	Ret	6	5	12	Ret	13	10	12	Ret	6	6	Ret	Ret	122	4th
2018	Renault Sport Formula One Team	Renault R.E.18	**P**	Sainz	10	11	9	5	7	10	8	8	12	Ret	12	9	11	8	8	17	10	7	Ret	12	6	122	4th
