= Renault V6 hybrid Formula One power unit =

Renault Energy F1 (2014–2015) Renault R.E. (2016–2018) Renault E-Tech (2019–2021) Renault E-Tech R.E. (2022–2025)

Overview
- Manufacturer: (France) Renault Sport and (France) Mecachrome (builder, assembler and tuner)
- Designer: 2014: Rob White (Deputy Managing Director - Technical); Naoki Tokunaga (Technical Director)
- Production: 2014–2025

Layout
- Configuration: V6 single hybrid turbocharged engine, 90° cylinder angle
- Displacement: 1.6 L (98 cu in)
- Cylinder bore: 80 mm (3.15 in)
- Piston stroke: 53 mm (2.09 in)
- Cylinder block material: Aluminum alloy
- Cylinder head material: Aluminum alloy
- Valvetrain: 24-valve (four-valves per cylinder), DOHC

Combustion
- Turbocharger: APC Pankl hybrid turbocharger with typical 5 bar boost pressure
- Fuel system: 500 bar (7,252 psi) gasoline direct fuel injection
- Management: McLaren TAG-320
- Fuel type: Total Excellium (2014–2016), BP Ultimate and Esso (2017–2018 - Red Bull Racing and Scuderia Toro Rosso (2017) only) unleaded gasoline 94.25% + 5.75% biofuel (2017–2021) later 90% + 10% Ethanol (2022–2024) later Eni Blu Super+ 90% + 10% Ethanol (2025)
- Oil system: Dry sump
- Cooling system: Single water pump

Output
- Power output: 600 + 160 hp (447 + 119 kW) (2014); 700–795 + 160 hp (522–593 + 119 kW) (2015–2021); 850 + 160 hp (634 + 119 kW) (2022–2025)
- Torque output: Approx. 600–822 N⋅m (443–606 ft⋅lb)

Dimensions
- Dry weight: 145 kg (320 lb) overall including headers, clutch, ECU, spark box or filters

Chronology
- Predecessor: RS

The Renault E-Tech R.E. Series (previously known as Renault Energy F1, Renault R.E. and Renault E-Tech) is a 1.6-liter, hybrid turbocharged V6 racing engine developed and produced by Renault Sport F1 in partnership with Mecachrome for use in the FIA Formula One World Championship from 2014 until 2025. Initially conceived for the regulation changes of 2014, Renault's hybrid power units feature electric motors specialised for recovery of kinetic energy, titled the MGU-K, and one for recovery of heat energy, titled the MGU-H.

The turbo-hybrid engines served as a replacement for the outgoing Renault RS27 naturally-aspirated V8 engine, which had been in use since 2006. The engine was first unveiled on 21 June 2013, during the 2013 Paris Air Show.

At launch, Renault engines were utilised by Red Bull, Red Bull's sister team Scuderia Toro Rosso, Lotus (the rebranding of the former Renault works team, also known as Team Enstone), and Caterham. However, the engines suffered a reliability and performance deficit against their competitors' faster power units, leading to a public breakdown of trust between Red Bull and Renault; from 2016 to 2018, Red Bull's power units were badged with the name of the watch company TAG Heuer. McLaren began to use Renault power units in 2018 and switched to Mercedes units in 2021, leaving Team Enstone's then-new brand of Alpine as Renault's sole works supplier. Due to the continued deficits against other power units, as proven by Alpine's poor performance and reliability, Renault officially announced that they would be pulling out of Formula One engine developments after the 2025 season - ahead of the 2026 regulation changes - with their historic Viry-Châtillon factory being repurposed as an engineering centre for Alpine and Renault cars. Despite pulling out of engine development, Renault's branding remains on the Alpine A526.

== List of engines ==
=== Renault Energy F1-2014 ===
The Renault Energy F1-2014 was Renault's first-ever V6 hybrid turbocharged Formula One engine for the 2014 season. The Renault Energy F1-2014 engine was developed by Renault with technical support from Mecachrome for design research & development, trackside support, engine arrangement, preparation, tune-up and engine maintenance. The Renault Energy F1-2014 suffered reliability problems during pre-season testing.

==== Applications ====
- Red Bull RB10
- Lotus E22
- Toro Rosso STR9
- Caterham CT05

=== Renault Energy F1-2015 ===
==== Applications ====
- Red Bull RB11
- Toro Rosso STR10

=== Renault R.E.16 ===
==== Applications ====
- Renault R.S.16
- Red Bull RB12 (badged as TAG Heuer F1-2016)

=== Renault R.E.17 ===
==== Applications ====
- Renault R.S.17
- Red Bull RB13 (badged as TAG Heuer F1-2017)
- Toro Rosso STR12 (badged as Toro Rosso)

=== Renault R.E.18 ===
==== Applications ====
- Renault R.S.18
- Red Bull RB14 (badged as TAG Heuer F1-2018)
- McLaren MCL33

=== Renault E-Tech 19 ===
==== Applications ====
- Renault R.S.19
- McLaren MCL34

=== Renault E-Tech 20 ===
==== Applications ====
- Renault R.S.20
- McLaren MCL35

=== Renault E-Tech 20B ===
==== Applications ====
- Alpine A521

=== Renault E-Tech R.E.22 ===
==== Applications ====
- Alpine A522

=== Renault E-Tech R.E.23 ===
==== Applications ====
- Alpine A523

=== Renault E-Tech R.E.24 ===
==== Applications ====
- Alpine A524

=== Renault E-Tech R.E.25 ===
==== Applications ====
- Alpine A525
