= 2015 Belgian Grand Prix =

Formula One motor race held in 2015

Race 11 of 19 in the 2015 Formula One World Championship
| ← Previous race | Next race → |
- Layout of the Spa-Francorchamps circuit

Race details
- Date: 23 August 2015
- Official name: 2015 Formula 1 Shell Belgian Grand Prix
- Location: Circuit de Spa-Francorchamps; Stavelot, Belgium
- Course: Permanent racing facility
- Course length: 7.004 km (4.352 miles)
- Distance: 43 laps, 301.048 km (187.063 miles)
- Scheduled distance: 44 laps, 308.052 km (191.415 miles)
- Weather: Cloudy; 23 °C (73 °F) air temperature 33–37 °C (91–99 °F) track temperature 3.5 m/s (11 ft/s) wind from the northwest

Pole position
| Driver | (United Kingdom) Lewis Hamilton | Mercedes |
- Time: 1:47.197

Fastest lap
| Driver | (Germany) Nico Rosberg | Mercedes |
- Time: 1:52.416 on lap 34

Podium
| First | (United Kingdom) Lewis Hamilton | Mercedes |
| Second | (Germany) Nico Rosberg | Mercedes |
| Third | (France) Romain Grosjean | Lotus-Mercedes |

The 2015 Belgian Grand Prix (formally the 2015 Formula 1 Shell Belgian Grand Prix) was a Formula One motor race held on 23 August 2015 at the Circuit de Spa-Francorchamps in Spa, Belgium. It was the eleventh round of the 2015 Formula One season, and the 71st Belgian Grand Prix.

Lewis Hamilton of Mercedes entered the event as the overall Drivers' Championship leader, 21 points ahead of his teammate Nico Rosberg and 42 points ahead of Ferrari's Sebastian Vettel. Mercedes led the Constructors' Championship by 147 points over Ferrari, while Williams entered the event in third, a further 85 points adrift. Having won the 2014 edition, Daniel Ricciardo was the defending race winner.

Lewis Hamilton won the race for Mercedes, extending his championship lead over Rosberg, who finished second, to 28 points. Romain Grosjean and Lotus secured a podium finish for the first time since the 2013 United States Grand Prix, Grosjean's last to date, benefitting from a controversial tyre failure on Sebastian Vettel's Ferrari late in the race.

The race was identified by Scuderia Ferrari as their 900th Grand Prix participation. McLaren was handed a record 105-place grid penalty for a multitude of changes to their Honda power units.

== Report ==
=== Background ===
Pirelli, Formula One's sole tyre supplier since 2011, supplied the ten teams with four compounds of tyres for the event. The two dry selections were the white-banded medium compound as the "prime" tyre, while the yellow-banded soft compound was provided as the softer "option" choice. The green-banded intermediate weather tyre and the blue-banded full wet compounds were brought to all events. As a consequence of Konstantin Tereshchenko's crash in a GP3 Series race in 2014, new asphalt was laid down on the inside of the final corner, replacing the patch of grass that was there before. In addition, a new kerb was added at the exit of the famous Eau Rouge corner, on the apex of turn four. The kerb was however removed on Saturday after the FIA discussed the matter with the drivers. At turn one, the La Source hairpin, the exit kerb was shortened to make it easier to rejoin the track in the event of a driver running wide.

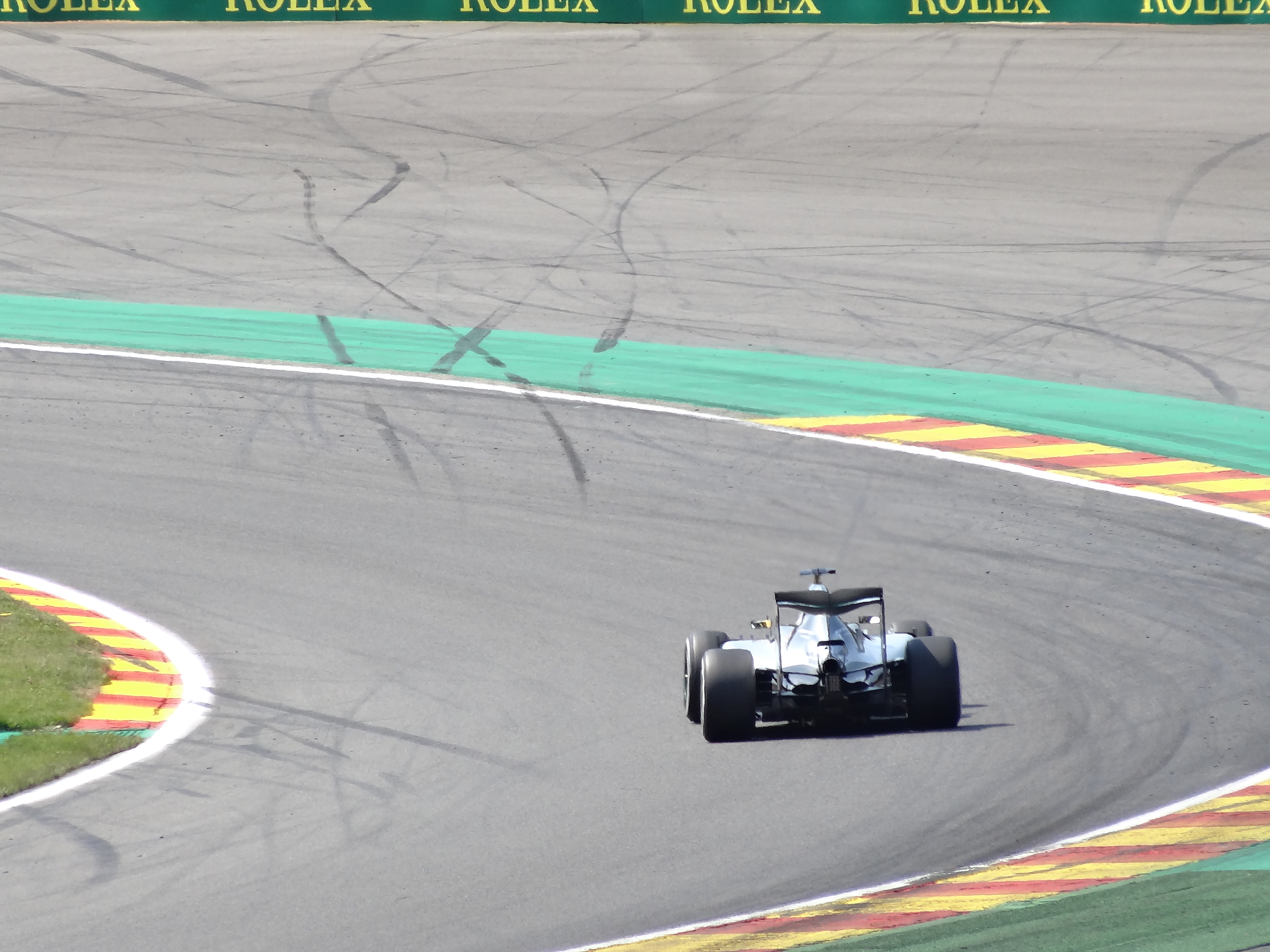
The new spoon shaped rear wing introduced on the Mercedes F1 W06 Hybrid

Scuderia Ferrari identified this race as their 900th Grand Prix participation. Driving for the Scuderia was Kimi Räikkönen, the most successful active driver at Spa, who extended his contract with the team for an additional year in the week prior to the race. Mercedes introduced a new low-downforce rear wing for Spa, featuring a spoon-shaped design, similar to that of the McLaren MP4-21 in 2006. The aim was to find a balance between low-downforce for the long straights on the Spa circuit while at the same time retaining enough downforce for the more twisting second sector of the track. Red Bull on the other hand tested two different rear wings during Friday's free practice sessions. While Daniel Ricciardo ran with a very low-downforce wing, Daniil Kvyat tested a "more Spa-specific set-up", which was ultimately used by both drivers in qualifying and the race to prevent tyre degradation. McLaren came to Spa with a new specification power unit, aiming to reach the level of Ferrari's unit with the introduced changes. However, the team's racing director Éric Boullier warned that it might take until Singapore until the gains could be visible and expected a "difficult" Belgian Grand Prix. In suit with the new power unit the team introduced a new engine cover. Further updates to the McLaren MP4-30 included an "unprecedented" tray design for the front of the floor, as well as lower sidepods and a new position for the radiator that cools the electronic recovery system.

Going into the weekend, Lewis Hamilton led the Drivers' Championship with 202 points, 21 ahead of second placed Nico Rosberg. Sebastian Vettel for Ferrari was a further 21 points behind Rosberg, having closed the gap by winning the previous round in Hungary. In the Constructors' Championship, Mercedes with 383 points were leading Ferrari by 147 points, while third placed Williams were a further 85 points behind.

==== Regulation changes ====
In an attempt to limit the influence of pit walls on their drivers during race starts, new regulations were introduced for the start procedure from the Belgian Grand Prix onwards. Drivers were now only allowed to adjust one clutch level after leaving the pit garage for the starting grid. The response from drivers was mixed, with Nico Rosberg commenting that the new start procedures would be challenging, while Fernando Alonso opined that the changes were not significant, and Daniel Ricciardo hoped the new procedure might help his team.

==== Lotus legal troubles ====
The Lotus team experienced legal difficulties over the Spa weekend, as a legal battle with former test driver Charles Pic, concerning the time the team had granted Pic at the wheel of their 2014 car. With the case in arbitration court, Lotus faced the threat of their cars being impounded and unable to move following the conclusion of the Grand Prix weekend. The bailiffs returned the cars to Lotus and the team was eventually able to travel to Italy, after Bernie Ecclestone, chief executive of the Formula One Group, "stepped in to ensure staff were paid", while their financial problems continued to question the team's future.

=== Free practice ===
Per the regulations for the 2015 season, three practice sessions were held, two 90-minute sessions on Friday and another one-hour session before qualifying on Saturday. In the first practice session on Friday morning, Nico Rosberg was fastest after initial trouble with his power unit, a quarter of a second ahead of his Mercedes teammate Lewis Hamilton. Daniel Ricciardo (Red Bull) was third, just five hundredths of a second slower than Hamilton, with Kimi Räikkönen another tenth down in fourth. Fifty minutes into the session, a red flag came out when Pastor Maldonado lost traction at the rear end of his Lotus E23 Hybrid at the exit of Les Combes corner and crashed into the tyre barriers, damaging the front-right of his car. The session was stopped for ten minutes for the track marshals to repair the barriers. Speaking about his accident, Maldonado said: "It was very unlucky because I nearly saved the car. But anyway, it happened. This track is always very difficult when you have a moment or whatever, especially at that point where the second sector is quite narrow. But this can happen. Now we can't change that. We need to look forward." In the second Lotus, Romain Grosjean was again replaced by Jolyon Palmer, who finished practice 17th.

"It wasn't down to my skill, it was just luck that I stayed out of the wall. [...] It was quite a shock in the first moment because I just don't expect it. Suddenly at 306kph you just lose control – not good."

— Nico Rosberg, speaking about his spin in Free Practice 2

Another accident marred the second practice session on Friday afternoon, when a rear tyre on Nico Rosberg's Mercedes blew, causing him to spin in the run-up to Blanchimont corner. Rosberg was able to avoid hitting the tyre barriers, but the session was nevertheless red-flagged in order to clear the track of the car. Prior to this incident, Rosberg had set the fastest time of the session with 1:49.687, three-tenths of a second faster than teammate Hamilton, in second. Ricciardo was again third, a further 0.4 seconds adrift, ahead of fellow Red Bull driver Daniil Kvyat, one second behind Rosberg. The Williams cars of Valtteri Bottas and Felipe Massa were 14th and 16th respectively, ahead of the two McLaren drivers, who were faster only than the two Manor Marussia cars. Rosberg's tyre failure was later deemed the result of an "external cut", excluding the possibility of "any structural integrity issues". Rosberg however remained worried about the reliability of the tyres for Sunday's race, saying: "The problem is that we don't really understand it. There are theories but there is no real evidence, so that's a bit worrying for sure."

World champion Lewis Hamilton bounced back in the third session on Saturday morning, being quickest, almost half a second faster than Rosberg. In "an uneventful session", the two Ferrari drivers were third and fourth, with Vettel leading Räikkönen. Meanwhile, the Force India drivers Sergio Pérez and Nico Hülkenberg ended the session in fifth and eighth respectively, separated by the Red Bull drivers. The only nuisance in third practice occurred when Romain Grosjean almost spun having to go around Kimi Räikkönen in turn 16, complaining to his team about a "very, very dangerous" manoeuvre.

=== Qualifying ===
Qualifying consisted of three parts, 18, 15 and 12 minutes in length respectively, with five drivers eliminated from competing after each of the first two sessions. Valtteri Bottas was first and last out on track during the first part of qualifying (Q1), starting the lap that saved him from elimination in the very last moments of the session. Excluded from further participation were both Manor Marussia cars, both McLaren drivers and Sauber's Felipe Nasr. Max Verstappen succeeded in progressing into Q2 despite complaining about a loss of power on his car.

The second part of qualifying saw Kimi Räikkönen come to a halt on track due to a loss of oil pressure. The session was briefly red-flagged to clear the track and when it resumed, both Mercedes drivers decided not to head out again, since their first times where sufficient to advance to Q3. Max Verstappen did not compete in Q2 at all due to the problems on his car, leaving him in provisional 14th (bar his penalty) and Räikkönen in 15th on the grid. The other three drivers to be eliminated were Marcus Ericsson for Sauber, Daniil Kvyat and Nico Hülkenberg. Hülkenberg's time was just three-tenths of a second slower than that of Sebastian Vettel in tenth and he became the only driver of a Mercedes-powered car not to compete for pole position.

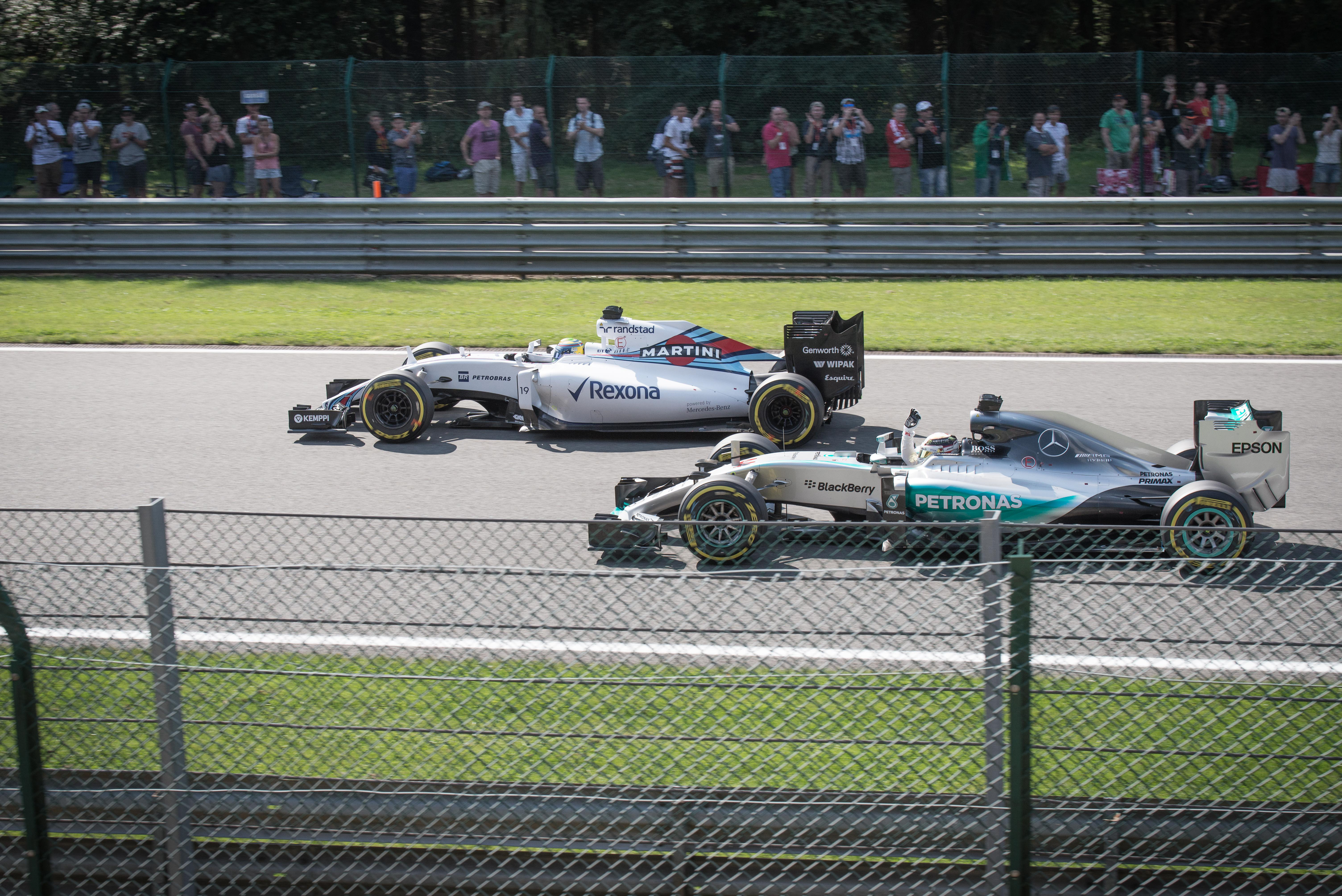
Lewis Hamilton celebrates taking pole position.

Lewis Hamilton was the first Mercedes driver to set a timed lap in Q3, being almost half a second faster than Rosberg in Q2. While Rosberg succeeded in bettering his times as well, he nevertheless ended up 0.458 seconds behind his teammate and second on the grid. This handed Lewis Hamilton his tenth pole position in eleven races, meaning that he secured the FIA Pole Position Trophy at this early stage of the season. The next fastest car, Valtteri Bottas for Williams was 1.3 seconds off Hamilton's time of 1:47.197. Fourth fastest was Grosjean, who delivered what the BBC called a "stunningly impressive" lap. Sergio Pérez put in a surprising effort as well, finishing fifth for Force India. Meanwhile, Sebastian Vettel, who had won the previous race in Hungary, managed only ninth fastest after a mistake at the final chicane.

After qualifying, Hamilton stated his performance was mainly due to improvements he made in the middle sector of the lap, saying: "Sector two has been probably in the past a bit of a weak point. I knew the lines but could never really put the corners together. Definitely on those last two laps that was a very, very strong area for me." Indeed, he gained most of his time on Rosberg in this sector, containing the majority of the circuit's corners. He became the first driver since Michael Schumacher – who achieved the feat in 2000–2001 – to secure six consecutive pole positions, while the last driver to score six consecutive poles in one season was Mika Häkkinen in 1999. Following their poor qualifying performance and grid penalties, Jenson Button expected a "lonely race" for McLaren, saying: "I actually enjoyed driving the car, and when you cross the finishing line and you see the time you think 'That's not bad'. But then when you see where you are, a second off the guy in front of you, it's a massive margin, it hurts."

=== Penalties ===
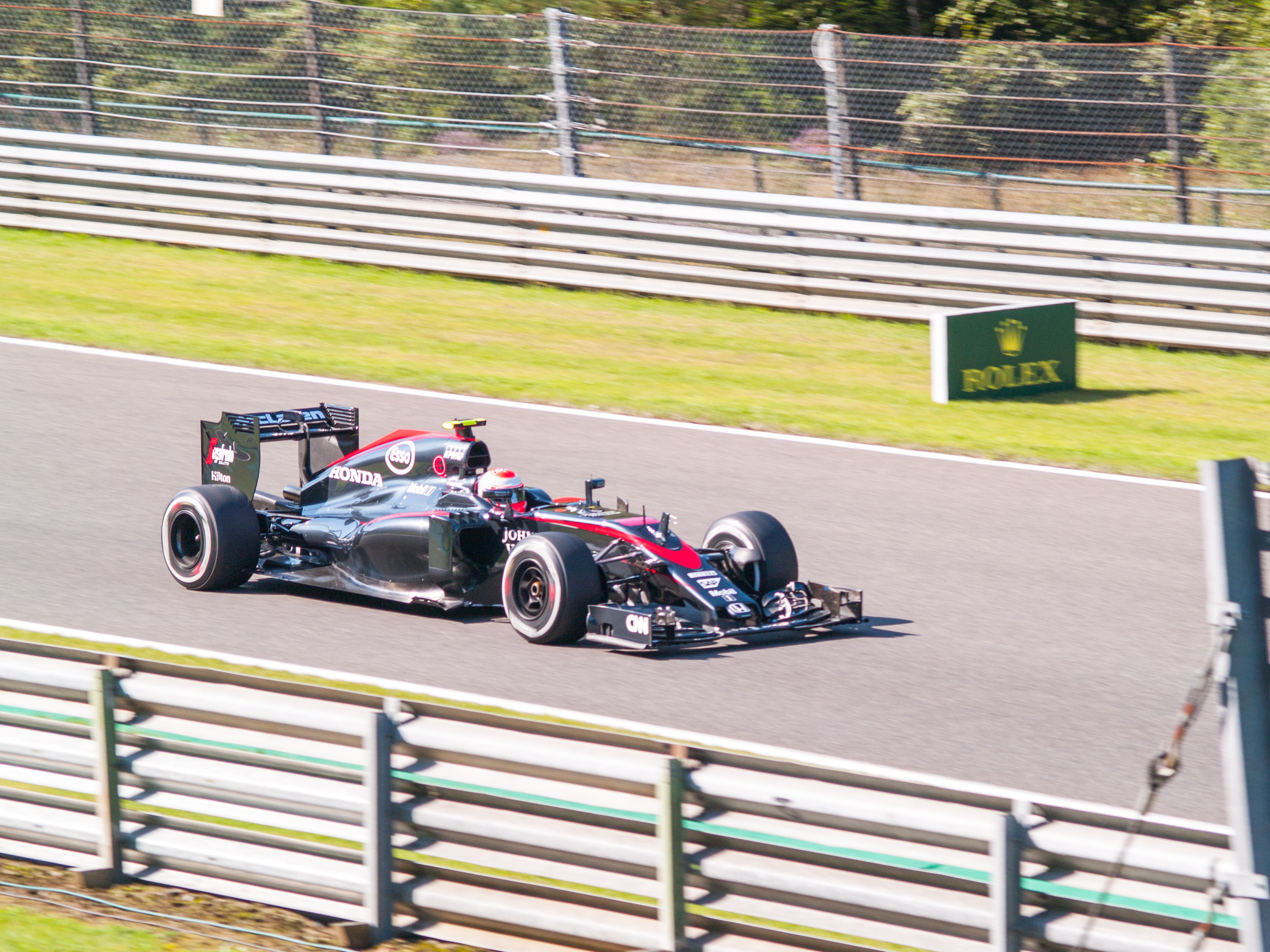
Jenson Button expected a "lonely race" after a poor qualifying and a grid penalty.

McLaren, who were expected to benefit from the start changes, were set to start the race from the back of the grid. After they had already been allowed to use one additional power unit in the 2015 season, the team had used their sixth power unit for the Hungarian Grand Prix, and now equipped both cars with a seventh, heavily revised version of their power unit for Belgium on Friday. McLaren made another power unit change on Saturday, since a mid-season change in regulations meant that penalties could no longer result in in-race time penalties. The cumulative 105-place grid penalty set a new record in Formula One.

Max Verstappen received a ten-place grid penalty after he equipped his sixth power unit on Friday. After Lotus changed the gearbox on Romain Grosjean's car on Saturday, Grosjean was handed a five-place grid penalty, moving him from fourth to ninth on the grid. For the same reason, Kimi Räikkönen received a five-place grid penalty, which only set him back two places due to penalties of other drivers.

=== Race ===
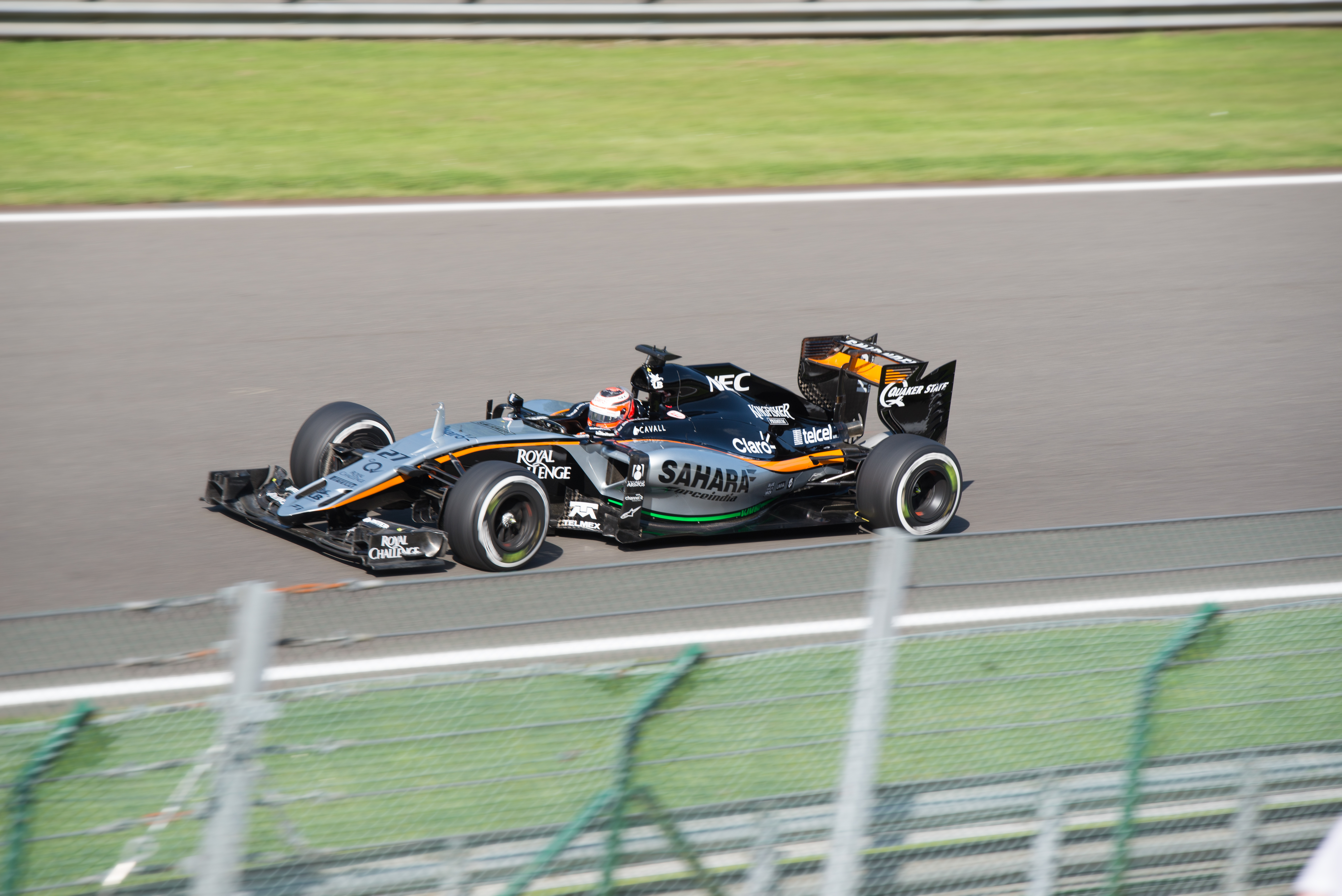
Nico Hülkenberg was unable to start the race.

Prior to the race start, Nico Hülkenberg returned to the pit garage after reporting a loss of power on his Force India, but he eventually made it to the grid. His problem returned during the formation lap and when his car stalled on the starting grid, the starting procedure was aborted and another formation lap commenced. Carlos Sainz Jr. experienced a similar problem during the second formation lap and was called into the pit lane. He was eventually sent out after the race started. The race distance was therefore shortened to 43 laps.

At the start, Nico Rosberg did not get away well, falling back to fifth behind Pérez, Ricciardo and Bottas, but overtook the latter for fourth by the end of the lap. Fernando Alonso did also start well for McLaren, moving up to twelfth, while Lewis Hamilton retained his lead, pulling clear of Pérez's Force India early on. On lap two, Pastor Maldonado became the second retirement of the race when he stopped his car due to a power failure. On lap six, Daniil Kvyat took eighth place from Felipe Massa, while Romain Grosjean had quick first laps as well, overtaking the second Williams of Bottas for sixth on lap eight.

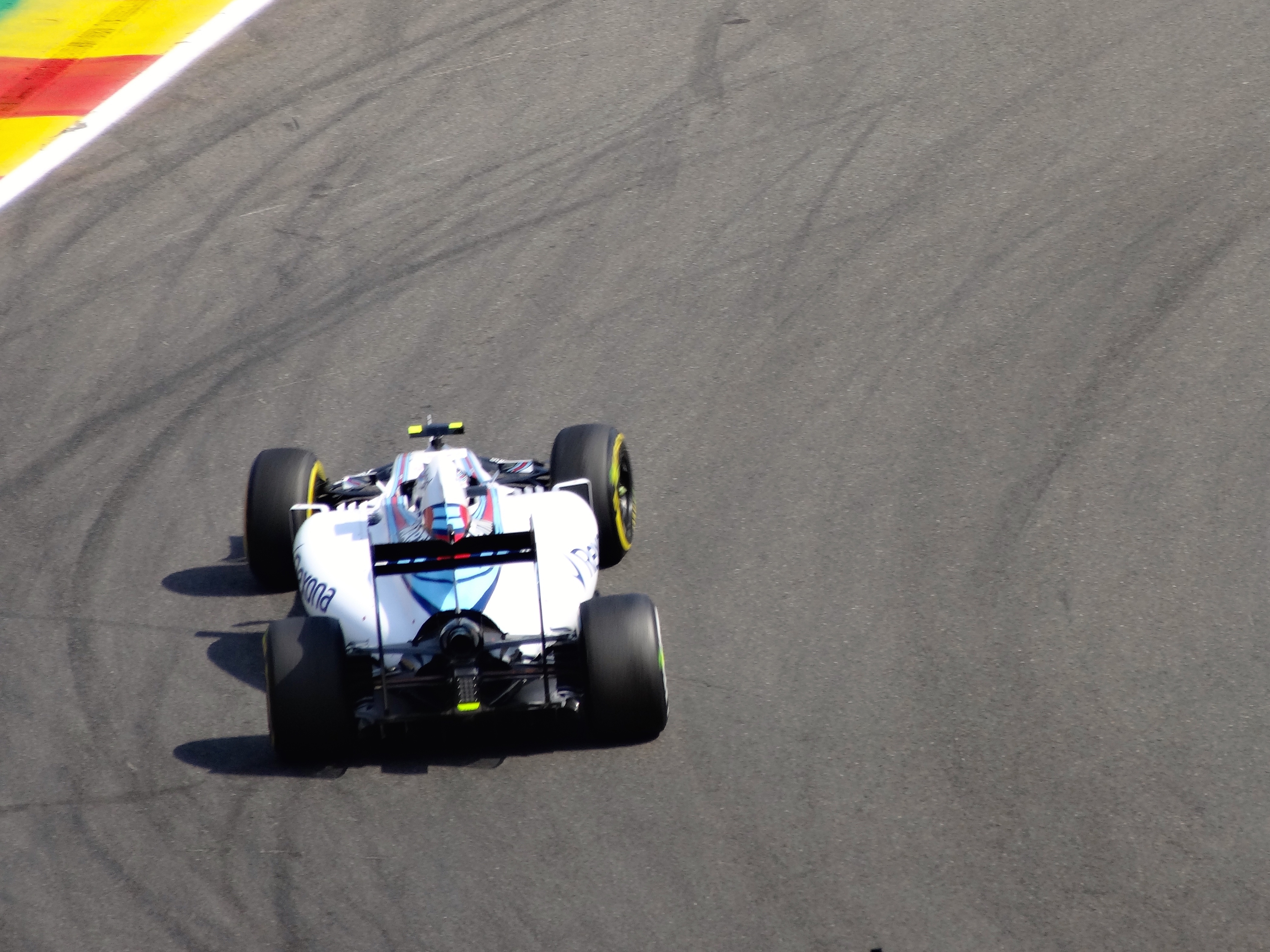
At his first pit stop, Valtteri Bottas's mechanics fitted his car with three soft-compound tyres and one medium-compound tyre. The erroneous tyre – the right-rear – resulted in Bottas serving a drive-through penalty.

An early pit stop by Ricciardo on lap eight forced the hand of Force India, who brought in Pérez one lap later, but Pérez still came out behind the Red Bull. Several more drivers came in over the next couple of laps, including Bottas and Grosjean, with the Williams taking back his position during the stops only to be overtaken again on lap ten. Bottas was also set for a penalty, as his team had simultaneously equipped him with two different types of tyre compounds. He would later serve a drive through penalty. Lap eleven saw a risky overtaking manoeuvre by Max Verstappen, who went around the outside of Nasr at Blanchimont to take eleventh place. Following these first stops, the order at the front was Hamilton, Rosberg, Vettel, Räikkönen and Ricciardo, with the first four yet to stop. Rosberg was the first to do so on lap 13, coming out slightly ahead of Pérez, who had overtaken Ricciardo a lap earlier. Pérez carried his momentum into Eau Rouge and up to turn seven, but ultimately failed to get the better of the Mercedes. Hamilton and Vettel made pit stops for new tyres on laps 14 and 15 respectively.

Over the next laps, Rosberg steadily closed on Hamilton in front without being able to catch his teammate. Lap 18 saw Romain Grosjean gain another position at Ricciardo's expense, moving into fourth. Just two laps later he passed Pérez putting in him third place. On lap 21, Daniel Ricciardo's Red Bull came to a sudden stop at the exit of the 'Bus Stop' chicane, leading to a Virtual Safety Car period, during which many drivers made pit stops for new tyres, among them Grosjean, Massa and Verstappen. By lap 29, Kvyat had made a pit stop for new soft tyres, being able to go fast until the end of the race, while Vettel decided to try and finish the race without pitting for new tyres a second time. Kvyat's newer tyres allowed him to overtake Bottas, Räikkönen, Massa and Pérez to eventually finish fourth. Sainz Jr. eventually retired from the race on lap 34. Vettel's strategy however did not work out. By lap 42, less than two laps from the finish, his right rear tyre exploded while on the Kemmel straight, handing Grosjean the final podium position. Vettel ended his race in the pit lane, but was classified down in twelfth place. Unchallenged by his teammate in second, Lewis Hamilton finished the race to take his 39th Grand Prix victory.

=== Post-race ===
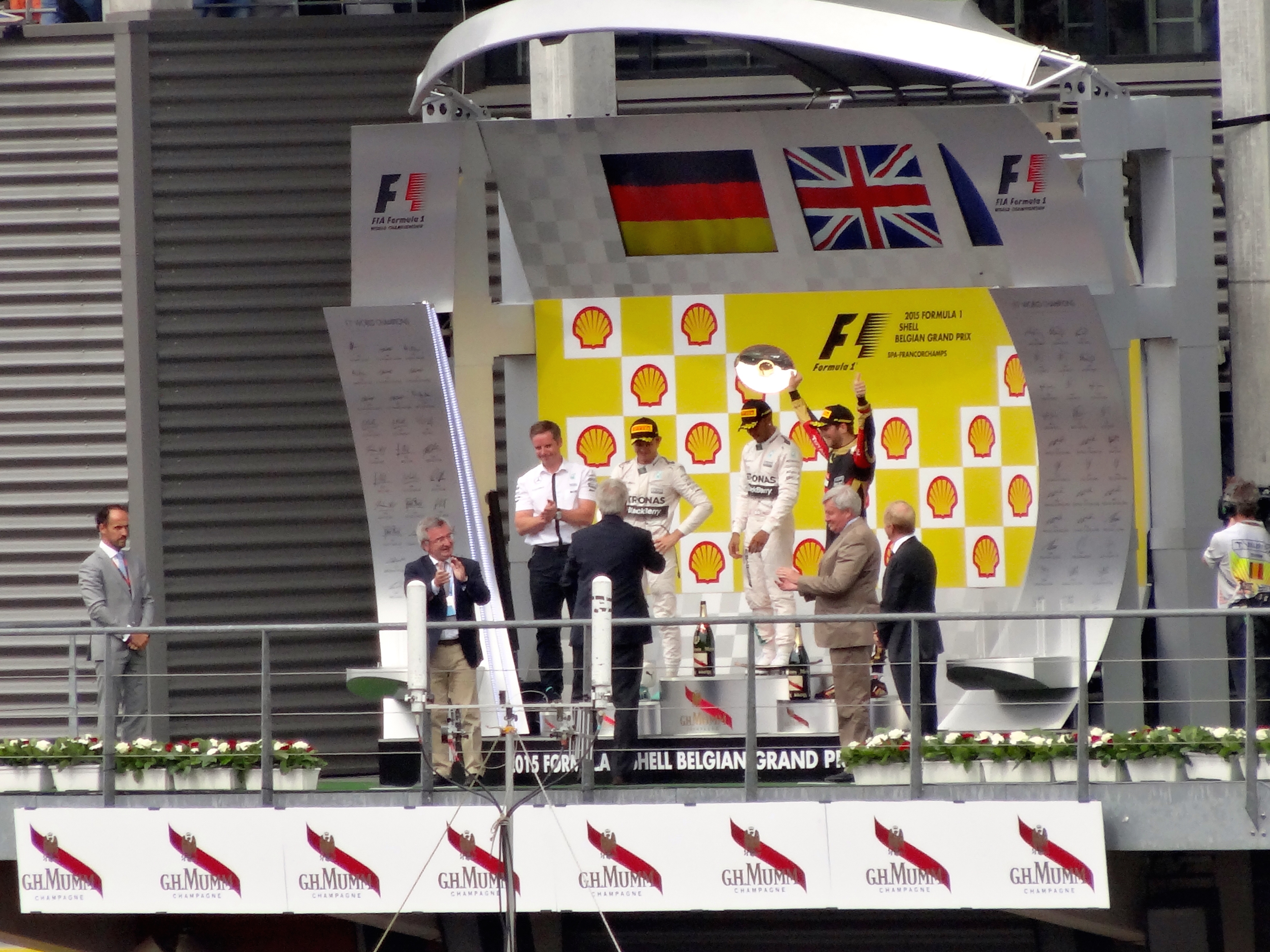
The post-race podium ceremony

At the podium interviews, conducted by BBC commentator David Coulthard, Lewis Hamilton said that he felt "fairly relaxed at the front", naming looking after the tyre wear as his only concern during the race. Nico Rosberg conceded that he "just completely messed up the start" and added that Hamilton "did a great job, so deserved to win". Romain Grosjean was delighted with his tenth career podium, speaking of "an incredible weekend" and claimed that the podium "has the feel of a race win". Asked about his title aspirations, Hamilton insisted that it was "definitely way too early" to speak about winning the world title. During the post-race press conference, Grosjean described the moment of Vettel's tyre failure as "a bit of a scary moment", saying that it was "very unfortunate he had that puncture".

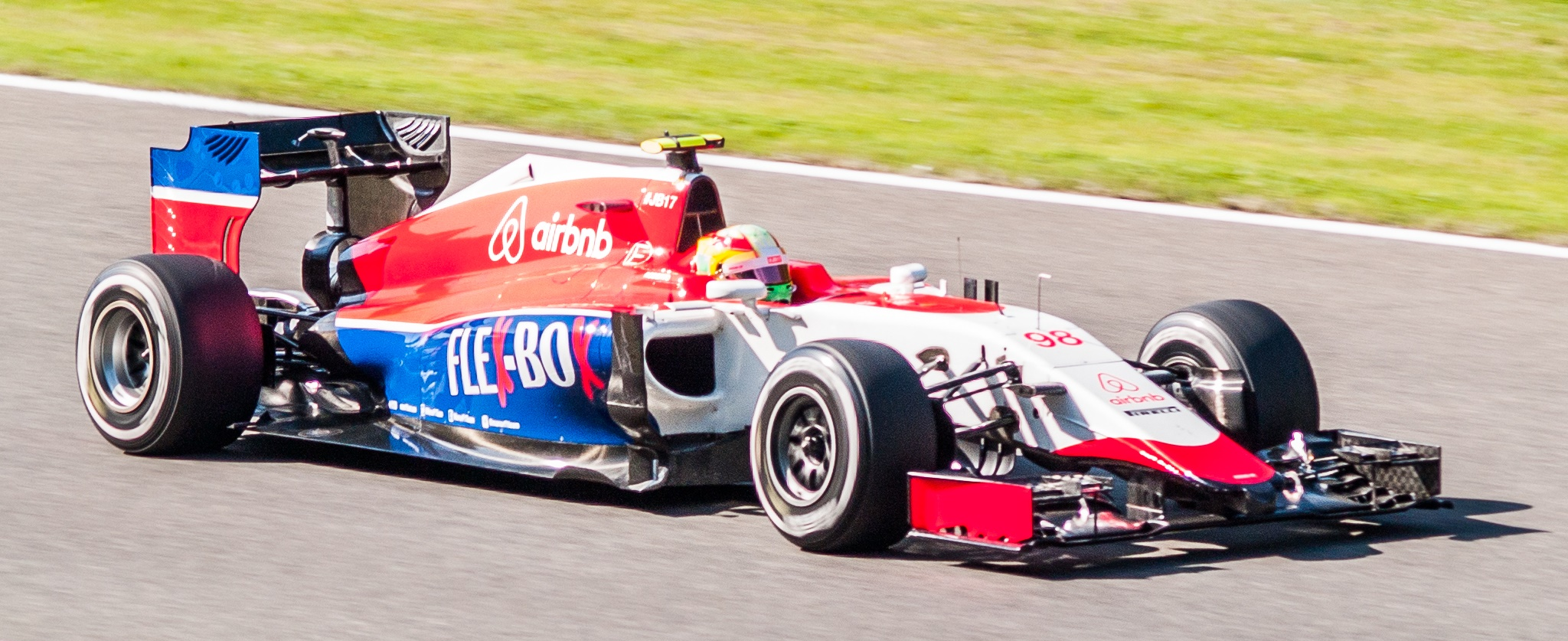
Roberto Merhi finished ahead of teammate Will Stevens for the fourth race in succession.

Following the race, Sebastian Vettel voiced harsh criticism of tyre supplier Pirelli, concerning not only his own but also Nico Rosberg's tyre failure on Friday. He was quoted saying: "I think it is a sort of thing that keeps going around and no-one mentions. It is unacceptable. If Nico tells us he did not go off the track, he didn't go off the track, why should he lie to us? It is the same with me, I didn't go off the track – it is out of the blue the tyre exploded [...]." He saw the safety of the drivers at risks, asserting that "[i]f it happens 200 metres earlier, I am not standing here now." Pirelli's Motorsport Director Paul Hembery reacted to Vettel's accusations by saying: "I am not going to criticise Sebastian. It is a hot moment and I don't want to enter into a war of words over that – it is pointless for everybody. We were concerned when we saw the number of laps that were going to be done. Nobody really suggested they were going to do a one-stop race and it was a bit of a surprise – if anything people were talking about doing three stops rather than two." Nico Rosberg however backed up his compatriot Vettel, telling the press: "The exploding tyres is poor. It shouldn't happen. That it keeps on happening in other categories as well and with me on Friday. Both of us were so lucky. If it had happened a couple of metres later or earlier, we would have one of the biggest shunts ever. They need to figure out something to make it safer." He also called for immediate action considering the Italian Grand Prix – the race following Spa-Francorchamps – due to its nature as the fastest race of the year. Pirelli reacted by demanding a maximum stint length for their tyres, a suggestion the company had already put in at the end of 2013. The day after the race, Pirelli announced that they had found cuts on other tyres from other teams, mainly on the rear tyres, and that they were still searching for the cause of the damages. Vettel received additional support from Coulthard, who wrote that Vettel was "right to tackle Pirelli" over the issue of tyres, as well as Coulthard's former teammate Mika Häkkinen. Vettel once again defended the team's decision to try a one-stop race on the Tuesday after the race, saying: "Our strategy was never risky, at any point. The team is not to blame." While they originally speculated that the blow out had been caused by an excessive tyre wear issue, when Pirelli released the findings of their own investigation into the matter, their findings concluded that the damage to Vettel's tyre was caused by debris.

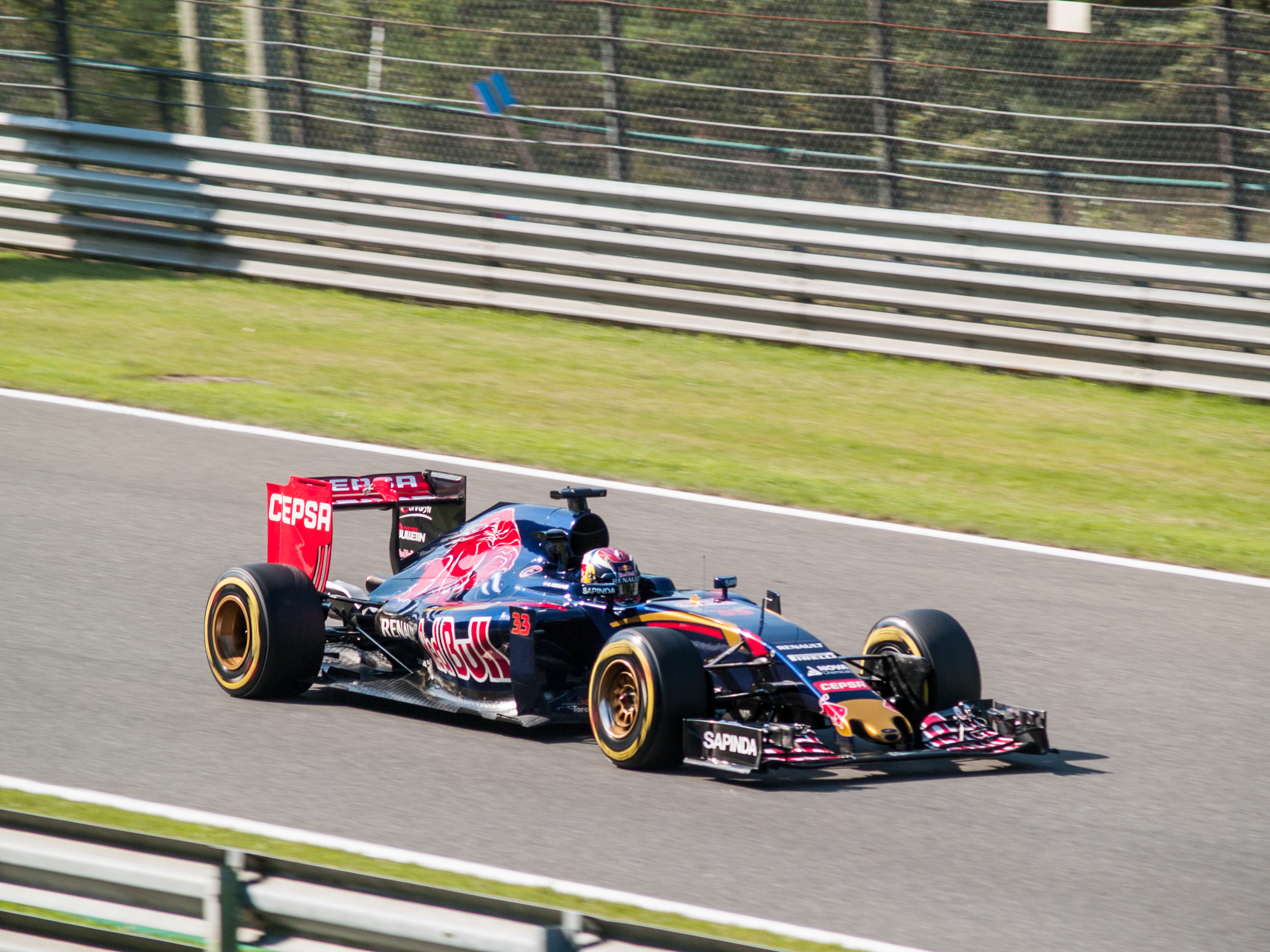
Max Verstappen was praised for his overtake on Felipe Nasr.

Max Verstappen received particular praise for his overtake on Felipe Nasr through Blanchimont. Former driver Allan McNish wrote: "This is the first time in my life I have seen someone go around the outside of someone at Blanchimont. That was big[.]" At the FIA Prize Giving ceremony on 4 December 2015, Verstappen received an award for Action of the Year, acknowledging his manoeuvre. Jenson Button on the other hand called McLaren's race an "embarrassment", after he had suffered from a lack of battery power throughout the race, finishing only ahead of the two Manor Marussia drivers. Lotus disclosed that Maldonado's retirement was in part caused by "heavy contact with the kerbs", with the intensity of impact being as high as 17 g_{0} (170 m/s^{2}). Technical director Nick Chester felt it was "a big shame" that Maldonado, who had been running ahead of eventual third placed Grosjean when he retired, was unable to contribute to a "strong result" for the team. Lotus later revealed that the retirement was caused by damage to the clutch control system sustained when he went off the track at Eau Rouge. At the same time, the team applauded Grosjean for a "faultless" drive. Additional praise for Grosjean came from motorsport journalist Mark Hughes, who felt that Grosjean was "still seriously under-rated" in Formula One. Williams launched an internal investigation into the tyre mix-up at Valtteri Bottas's first pit stop, feeling that it might have cost him a podium position.

As a result of the race, Lewis Hamilton extended his championship lead over Rosberg to 28 points, the biggest margin it had been all season up to that point. Vettel's tyre failure cost him points as he was now 67 points off the lead in the standings. In the Constructors' Championship, Mercedes extended their lead over Ferrari to 184 points, while Lotus moved into fifth place at the expense of Force India.

== Classification ==
=== Qualifying ===
| Pos. | Car no. | Driver | Constructor | Qualifying times | | | Final grid |
| Pos. | Car no. | Driver | Constructor | Q1 | Q2 | Q3 | Final grid |
|---|---|---|---|---|---|---|---|
| 1 | 44 | (United Kingdom) Lewis Hamilton | Mercedes | 1:48.908 | 1:48.024 | 1:47.197 | 1 |
| 2 | 6 | (Germany) Nico Rosberg | Mercedes | 1:48.923 | 1:47.955 | 1:47.655 | 2 |
| 3 | 77 | (Finland) Valtteri Bottas | Williams-Mercedes | 1:49.026 | 1:49.044 | 1:48.537 | 3 |
| 4 | 8 | (France) Romain Grosjean | Lotus-Mercedes | 1:49.353 | 1:48.981 | 1:48.561 | 9^{1} |
| 5 | 11 | (Mexico) Sergio Pérez | Force India-Mercedes | 1:49.006 | 1:48.792 | 1:48.599 | 4 |
| 6 | 3 | (Australia) Daniel Ricciardo | Red Bull Racing-Renault | 1:49.664 | 1:49.042 | 1:48.639 | 5 |
| 7 | 19 | (Brazil) Felipe Massa | Williams-Mercedes | 1:49.688 | 1:48.806 | 1:48.685 | 6 |
| 8 | 13 | (Venezuela) Pastor Maldonado | Lotus-Mercedes | 1:49.568 | 1:48.956 | 1:48.754 | 7 |
| 9 | 5 | (Germany) Sebastian Vettel | Ferrari | 1:49.264 | 1:48.761 | 1:48.825 | 8 |
| 10 | 55 | (Spain) Carlos Sainz Jr. | Toro Rosso-Renault | 1:49.109 | 1:49.065 | 1:49.771 | 10 |
| 11 | 27 | (Germany) Nico Hülkenberg | Force India-Mercedes | 1:49.499 | 1:49.121 | | 11 |
| 12 | 26 | (Russia) Daniil Kvyat | Red Bull Racing-Renault | 1:49.469 | 1:49.228 | | 12 |
| 13 | 9 | (Sweden) Marcus Ericsson | Sauber-Ferrari | 1:49.523 | 1:49.586 | | 13 |
| 14 | 7 | (Finland) Kimi Räikkönen | Ferrari | 1:49.288 | No time | | 16^{1} |
| 15 | 33 | (Netherlands) Max Verstappen | Toro Rosso-Renault | 1:49.831 | No time | | 18^{2} |
| 16 | 12 | (Brazil) Felipe Nasr | Sauber-Ferrari | 1:49.952 | | | 14 |
| 17 | 22 | (United Kingdom) Jenson Button | McLaren-Honda | 1:50.978 | | | 19^{3} |
| 18 | 14 | (Spain) Fernando Alonso | McLaren-Honda | 1:51.420 | | | 20^{4} |
| 19 | 28 | (United Kingdom) Will Stevens | Marussia-Ferrari | 1:52.948 | | | 15 |
| 20 | 98 | (Spain) Roberto Merhi | Marussia-Ferrari | 1:53.099 | | | 17 |
107% time: 1:56.531

Notes

- ^1 – Romain Grosjean and Kimi Räikkönen both received a five-place grid penalty for a gearbox change.
- ^2 – Max Verstappen received a ten-place grid penalty for using his sixth power unit during the season.
- ^3 – Jenson Button received a fifty-place grid penalty for a variety of changes made to his power unit.
- ^4 – Fernando Alonso received a fifty-five-place grid penalty for a variety of changes made to his power unit.

=== Race ===
| Pos. | No. | Driver | Constructor | Laps | Time/Retired | Grid | Points |
|---|---|---|---|---|---|---|---|
| 1 | 44 | (United Kingdom) Lewis Hamilton | Mercedes | 43 | 1:23:40.387 | 1 | 25 |
| 2 | 6 | (Germany) Nico Rosberg | Mercedes | 43 | +2.058 | 2 | 18 |
| 3 | 8 | (France) Romain Grosjean | Lotus-Mercedes | 43 | +37.988 | 9 | 15 |
| 4 | 26 | (Russia) Daniil Kvyat | Red Bull Racing-Renault | 43 | +45.692 | 12 | 12 |
| 5 | 11 | (Mexico) Sergio Pérez | Force India-Mercedes | 43 | +53.997 | 4 | 10 |
| 6 | 19 | (Brazil) Felipe Massa | Williams-Mercedes | 43 | +55.283 | 6 | 8 |
| 7 | 7 | (Finland) Kimi Räikkönen | Ferrari | 43 | +55.703 | 16 | 6 |
| 8 | 33 | (Netherlands) Max Verstappen | Toro Rosso-Renault | 43 | +56.076 | 18 | 4 |
| 9 | 77 | (Finland) Valtteri Bottas | Williams-Mercedes | 43 | +1:01.040 | 3 | 2 |
| 10 | 9 | (Sweden) Marcus Ericsson | Sauber-Ferrari | 43 | +1:31.234 | 13 | 1 |
| 11 | 12 | (Brazil) Felipe Nasr | Sauber-Ferrari | 43 | +1:42.311 | 14 | |
| 12^{1} | 5 | (Germany) Sebastian Vettel | Ferrari | 42 | Tyre failure | 8 | |
| 13 | 14 | (Spain) Fernando Alonso | McLaren-Honda | 42 | +1 Lap | 20 | |
| 14 | 22 | (United Kingdom) Jenson Button | McLaren-Honda | 42 | +1 Lap | 19 | |
| 15 | 98 | (Spain) Roberto Merhi | Marussia-Ferrari | 42 | +1 Lap | 17 | |
| 16 | 28 | (United Kingdom) Will Stevens | Marussia-Ferrari | 42 | +1 Lap | 15 | |
| Ret | 55 | (Spain) Carlos Sainz Jr. | Toro Rosso-Renault | 32 | Power unit | 10 | |
| Ret | 3 | (Australia) Daniel Ricciardo | Red Bull Racing-Renault | 19 | Electrics | 5 | |
| Ret | 13 | (Venezuela) Pastor Maldonado | Lotus-Mercedes | 2 | Power unit | 7 | |
| DNS | 27 | (Germany) Nico Hülkenberg | Force India-Mercedes | 0 | Power unit | — | |

Notes

- ^1 – Sebastian Vettel was classified because he completed over 90% of the race distance.

== Championship standings after the race ==
Drivers' Championship standings

| | Pos. | Driver | Points |
|---|---|---|---|
| | 1 | (United Kingdom) Lewis Hamilton | 227 |
| | 2 | (Germany) Nico Rosberg | 199 |
| | 3 | (Germany) Sebastian Vettel | 160 |
| 1 | 4 | (Finland) Kimi Räikkönen | 82 |
| 1 | 5 | (Brazil) Felipe Massa | 82 |

Constructors' Championship standings

| | Pos. | Constructor | Points |
|---|---|---|---|
| | 1 | (Germany) Mercedes | 426 |
| | 2 | (Italy) Ferrari | 242 |
| | 3 | (United Kingdom) Williams-Mercedes | 161 |
| | 4 | (Austria) Red Bull Racing-Renault | 108 |
| 1 | 5 | (United Kingdom) Lotus-Mercedes | 50 |
Sources:

- Note: Only the top five positions are included for both sets of standings.

== See also ==
- 2015 Spa-Francorchamps GP2 Series round
- 2015 Spa-Francorchamps GP3 Series round

| Previous race: 2015 Hungarian Grand Prix | FIA Formula One World Championship; 2015 season | Next race: 2015 Italian Grand Prix |
| Previous race: 2014 Belgian Grand Prix | Belgian Grand Prix | Next race: 2016 Belgian Grand Prix |
