= 2016 Belgian Grand Prix =

Formula One auto race

Race 13 of 21 in the 2016 Formula One World Championship
← Previous race	Next race →
- Layout of the Spa-Francorchamps circuit

Race details
- Date: 28 August 2016
- Official name: 2016 Formula 1 Belgian Grand Prix
- Location: Circuit de Spa-Francorchamps; Stavelot, Belgium
- Course: Permanent racing facility
- Course length: 7.004 km (4.352 miles)
- Distance: 44 laps, 308.052 km (191.415 miles)
- Weather: Partially cloudy and dry
- Attendance: 233,730 (Weekend)

Pole position
Driver	(Germany) Nico Rosberg	Mercedes
- Time: 1:46.744

Fastest lap
Driver	(United Kingdom) Lewis Hamilton	Mercedes
- Time: 1:51.583 on lap 40

Podium
First	(Germany) Nico Rosberg	Mercedes
Second	(Australia) Daniel Ricciardo	Red Bull Racing-TAG Heuer
Third	(United Kingdom) Lewis Hamilton	Mercedes

The 2016 Belgian Grand Prix (formally known as the 2016 Formula 1 Belgian Grand Prix) was a Formula One motor race held on 28 August 2016 at the Circuit de Spa-Francorchamps in Spa, Belgium. It was the thirteenth round of the 2016 FIA Formula One World Championship, and marks the seventy-second running of the Belgian Grand Prix and the fifty-ninth time the race was held at Spa-Francorchamps. It was also the first time eventual race winner Esteban Ocon drove in a F1 race.

Mercedes driver and defending race winner Lewis Hamilton entered the race leading the World Drivers' Championship by nineteen points ahead of teammate Nico Rosberg. In the World Constructors' Championship, Mercedes held a lead of 159 points. Red Bull Racing was lying second, having passed Ferrari in the standings at the previous round in Germany.

Nico Rosberg won this Grand Prix, with Daniel Ricciardo and Lewis Hamilton, second and third respectively. Hamilton received a multi-grid penalty before the start of the race. Hamilton retained the championship lead, with Rosberg closing the gap to nine points. Red Bull's Max Verstappen and both Ferraris were involved in an incident at the start of the race.

The race was stopped on lap 9 after Kevin Magnussen crashed heavily at Raidillon, suffering a 12.5 g impact, causing structural damage to the armoured collision barrier and tyre wall which required repairs, before the race could resume under green flag conditions. Magnussen suffered a cut on his ankle but no serious injury.

== Background ==
=== Driver changes ===
Esteban Ocon made his Formula One début, replacing Rio Haryanto at MRT. Haryanto stayed with the team, filling a testing and reserve role.

=== Tyres ===
Tyre supplier Pirelli provided teams with super-soft, soft and medium compounds for the races. Drivers were also supplied with two sets of "prototype" soft tyres for use in the Friday practice sessions, which were designed to provide similar lap times and performance to the existing soft compound whilst being more durable when striking kerbs and going beyond track limits. The prototype tyres were introduced to allow Pirelli to gain data on their performance ahead of their competitive début in Malaysia, where they will replace the existing soft compound.

=== Upgrades ===
Both Honda and Mercedes introduced upgrades to their power units for the race, while Sauber brought their first updates of the season for the C35 chassis.

=== Penalties ===
Lewis Hamilton, Marcus Ericsson and Fernando Alonso took grid penalties for exceeding their season allocation of engine components; Hamilton received fifteen places for using his sixth turbocharger and associated Motor Generator Unit, while Ericsson was demoted ten places for replacing his turbocharger, and Alonso thirty-five places for introducing his sixth complete power unit. Hamilton received a second set of penalties when Mercedes introduced a seventh turbocharger and MGU-H ahead of the second free practice session; and a third set for further changes ahead of the final practice session, thereby guaranteeing that he would start the race from last place. Mercedes deliberately took the penalties as they sought to stockpile new components for the remainder of the season, deeming the Circuit de Spa-Francorchamps to be a venue where the potential for overtaking offset the penalties.

Esteban Gutiérrez received a five-place grid penalty for dangerous driving during the final practice session when Pascal Wehrlein was forced to take evasive action and cross the grassy verge inside Raidillon to avoid contact.

On race day, Mercedes removed a seal on the gearbox of Hamilton's car so he could take a new gearbox at the next race, giving the world champion an additional five place grid penalty. The penalty was initially incorrectly issued and originally designated Hamilton to start from the pit lane.

== Qualifying ==
Pos.	Car no.	Driver	Constructor	Qualifying times			Final grid
Pos.	Car no.	Driver	Constructor	Q1	Q2	Q3	Final grid
1	6	(Germany) Nico Rosberg	Mercedes	1:48.019	1:46.999	1:46.744	1
2	33	(Netherlands) Max Verstappen	Red Bull Racing-TAG Heuer	1:48.407	1:47.163	1:46.893	2
3	7	(Finland) Kimi Räikkönen	Ferrari	1:47.912	1:47.664	1:46.910	3
4	5	(Germany) Sebastian Vettel	Ferrari	1:47.802	1:47.944	1:47.108	4
5	3	(Australia) Daniel Ricciardo	Red Bull Racing-TAG Heuer	1:48.407	1:48.027	1:47.216	5
6	11	(Mexico) Sergio Pérez	Force India-Mercedes	1:48.106	1:47.485	1:47.407	6
7	27	(Germany) Nico Hülkenberg	Force India-Mercedes	1:48.080	1:47.317	1:47.543	7
8	77	(Finland) Valtteri Bottas	Williams-Mercedes	1:48.655	1:47.918	1:47.612	8
9	22	(United Kingdom) Jenson Button	McLaren-Honda	1:48.700	1:48.051	1:48.114	9
10	19	(Brazil) Felipe Massa	Williams-Mercedes	1:47.738	1:47.667	1:48.263	10
11	8	(France) Romain Grosjean	Haas-Ferrari	1:48.751	1:48.316		11
12	20	(Denmark) Kevin Magnussen	Renault	1:48.800	1:48.485		12
13	21	(Mexico) Esteban Gutiérrez	Haas-Ferrari	1:48.748	1:48.598		18^{1}
14	30	(United Kingdom) Jolyon Palmer	Renault	1:48.901	1:48.888		13
15	55	(Spain) Carlos Sainz Jr.	Toro Rosso-Ferrari	1:48.876	1:49.038		14
16	94	(Germany) Pascal Wehrlein	MRT-Mercedes	1:48.554	1:49.320		15
17	12	(Brazil) Felipe Nasr	Sauber-Ferrari	1:48.949			16
18	31	(France) Esteban Ocon	MRT-Mercedes	1:49.050			17
19	26	(Russia) Daniil Kvyat	Toro Rosso-Ferrari	1:49.058			19
20	9	(Sweden) Marcus Ericsson	Sauber-Ferrari	1:49.071			20^{2}
21	44	(United Kingdom) Lewis Hamilton	Mercedes	1:50.033			21^{3}
107% time: 1:55.279
22	14	(Spain) Fernando Alonso	McLaren-Honda	No time			22^{4}

Notes:

- ^1 – Esteban Gutiérrez received a five-place grid penalty for impeding Pascal Wehrlein during the final practice session on Saturday.
- ^2 – Marcus Ericsson was penalised 10 grid places for unscheduled power unit element changes.
- ^3 – Lewis Hamilton received a 60-place grid penalty after Mercedes opted to replace several elements on his power unit, then remove a seal from his gearbox.
- ^4 – Fernando Alonso received a 60-place grid penalty after McLaren opted to replace several elements on his power unit. As Alonso also failed to set a qualifying time, his participation in the race came at the stewards' discretion.

== Race ==
=== Race report ===
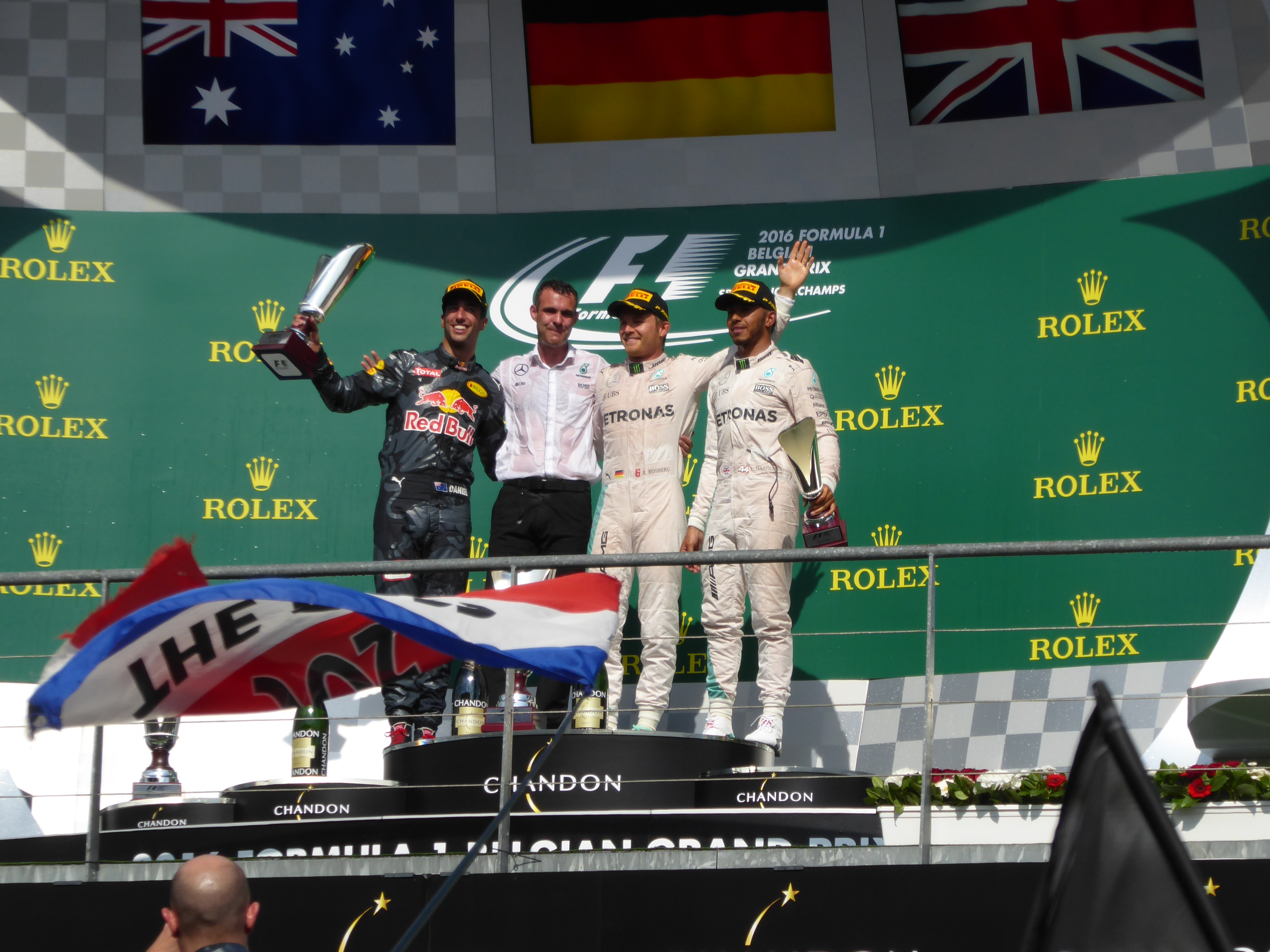
Nico Rosberg, Daniel Ricciardo, Lewis Hamilton and Mercedes team representative Hywel Thomas on the podium.

At the start Nico Rosberg got away well, Max Verstappen got a poor start and was passed by both Ferraris of Sebastian Vettel and Kimi Räikkönen, going into La Source Verstappen tried to come back at both Ferraris. Vettel could not see Verstappen and turned in on Räikkönen who couldn’t turn more because of Verstappen on his inside, this all resulting in Vettel hitting Räikkönen who was then bumped into the path of Verstappen, resulting in Verstappen hitting Räikkönen. This resulted in Vettel spinning round and all three had to come back to the pits for repairs. At Les Combes Jenson Button was hit by Manor's Pascal Wehrlein taking them both out of the race. Carlos Sainz suffered a tyre failure and pulled off the track causing a virtual safety car, at this point Fernando Alonso had made it up to 12th with all the chaos and Lewis Hamilton was up to 15th. The race restarted but soon after Kevin Magnussen suffered a crash when his car spun and smashed into the tyre wall at Raidillon, Magnussen limped out of the car but did require medical attention for an injured ankle, the race was initially neutralised under the safety car before being stopped two laps later so they could repair the tyre barrier. At the restart Hamilton was able to pass Alonso but then it took him several laps to get past the Force India of Nico Hülkenberg. Rosberg won the race followed by Daniel Ricciardo with Hamilton finishing third. Hamilton became the first ever driver to have claimed three podiums from 20th on the grid or lower.

=== Post race ===
Kevin Magnussen had been taken to hospital as a precaution but tweeted that he was fine and he would be racing at the next Grand Prix in Italy.

=== Race classification ===
Pos.	No.	Driver	Constructor	Laps	Time/Retired	Grid	Points
1	6	(Germany) Nico Rosberg	Mercedes	44	1:44:51.058	1	25
2	3	(Australia) Daniel Ricciardo	Red Bull Racing-TAG Heuer	44	+14.113	5	18
3	44	(United Kingdom) Lewis Hamilton	Mercedes	44	+27.634	21	15
4	27	(Germany) Nico Hülkenberg	Force India-Mercedes	44	+35.907	7	12
5	11	(Mexico) Sergio Pérez	Force India-Mercedes	44	+40.660	6	10
6	5	(Germany) Sebastian Vettel	Ferrari	44	+45.394	4	8
7	14	(Spain) Fernando Alonso	McLaren-Honda	44	+59.445	22	6
8	77	(Finland) Valtteri Bottas	Williams-Mercedes	44	+1:00.151	8	4
9	7	(Finland) Kimi Räikkönen	Ferrari	44	+1:01.109	3	2
10	19	(Brazil) Felipe Massa	Williams-Mercedes	44	+1:05.873	10	1
11	33	(Netherlands) Max Verstappen	Red Bull Racing-TAG Heuer	44	+1:11.138	2	
12	21	(Mexico) Esteban Gutiérrez	Haas-Ferrari	44	+1:13.877	18	
13	8	(France) Romain Grosjean	Haas-Ferrari	44	+1:16.474	11	
14	26	(Russia) Daniil Kvyat	Toro Rosso-Ferrari	44	+1:27.097	19	
15	30	(United Kingdom) Jolyon Palmer	Renault	44	+1:33.165	13	
16	31	(France) Esteban Ocon	MRT-Mercedes	43	+1 Lap	17	
17	12	(Brazil) Felipe Nasr	Sauber-Ferrari	43	+1 Lap	16	
Ret	20	(Denmark) Kevin Magnussen	Renault	5	Accident	12	
Ret	9	(Sweden) Marcus Ericsson	Sauber-Ferrari	3	Gearbox	20	
Ret	55	(Spain) Carlos Sainz Jr.	Toro Rosso-Ferrari	1	Puncture damage	14	
Ret	22	(United Kingdom) Jenson Button	McLaren-Honda	1	Collision damage	9	
Ret	94	(Germany) Pascal Wehrlein	MRT-Mercedes	0	Collision	15	

== Championship standings after the race ==
Drivers' Championship standings

	Pos.	Driver	Points
	1	(United Kingdom) Lewis Hamilton	232
	2	(Germany) Nico Rosberg	223
	3	(Australia) Daniel Ricciardo	151
1	4	(Germany) Sebastian Vettel	128
1	5	(Finland) Kimi Räikkönen	124

Constructors' Championship standings

	Pos.	Constructor	Points
	1	(Germany) Mercedes	455
	2	(Austria) Red Bull Racing-TAG Heuer	274
	3	(Italy) Ferrari	252
1	4	Force India-Mercedes	103
1	5	(United Kingdom) Williams-Mercedes	101

- Note: Only the top five positions are included for both sets of standings.

== See also ==
- 2016 Spa-Francorchamps GP2 Series round
- 2016 Spa-Francorchamps GP3 Series round

Previous race: 2016 German Grand Prix	FIA Formula One World Championship; 2016 season	Next race: 2016 Italian Grand Prix
Previous race: 2015 Belgian Grand Prix	Belgian Grand Prix	Next race: 2017 Belgian Grand Prix
