= Pierre Genon =

Belgian engineer

- Citizenship: Belgian
- Education: University of Liège, Cranfield University
- Occupation: Engineer
- Employer: Haas F1 Team
- Title: Toyota project manager

Pierre Genon is a Belgian Formula One and motorsports engineer. He is currently the Toyota Project Manager for the Haas F1 Team.

== Career ==
Genon studied electro-mechanical engineering at the University of Liège before completing a Master’s degree in Aerospace Vehicle Design at Cranfield University. He began his career in motorsport with AP Racing in 1995, designing braking and clutch components, before joining Prodrive in 1997 to work on the Subaru World Rally Team programme. Over more than a decade with Prodrive he held a number of senior engineering roles, including serving as race engineer to Colin McRae, Richard Burns, and Tommi Mäkinen. He progressed to become Chief Rally Engineer, contributing to Petter Solberg’s 2003 World Rally Championship title. He later served as Chief Test and Development Engineer, leading the technical direction of Subaru’s WRC testing and performance programmes. In 2009 Genon moved to Peugeot Sport as Race Engineer on the LMP1 endurance programme, helping deliver overall victory at the 2009 24 Hours of Le Mans and additional race wins in the FIA World Endurance Championship.

Genon moved into Formula One in 2012 when he joined the Enstone-based Lotus F1 Team as Head of Vehicle Performance Group. In this role he oversaw vehicle modelling, simulation, vertical dynamics, and the driver-in-the-loop simulator. In 2014 he was promoted to Head of Performance Systems, with responsibility for all performance-engineering-related programmes, including race strategy, while also contributing to major infrastructure projects such as simulator and transmission dynamometer development. He remained in this position as the team transitioned to Renault Sport and later to the Alpine F1 Team.

In 2025 Genon joined the Haas F1 Team as Toyota Project Manager, coordinating the technical collaboration between Haas and Toyota Gazoo Racing, including the development of Haas’s first driver-in-the-loop simulator.
