= Chris Cooney =

British engineer

- Education: Imperial College London
- Occupation: Engineer
- Known for: Formula One Engineer

Chris Cooney is a British Formula One engineer. He is best known for being the engineering at Lotus F1 Team and Renault F1 Team between 2013 and 2019. He is currently a consultant engineer for the Cadillac Formula One Team.

== Career ==
Cooney graduated in mechanical engineering from Imperial College London in 1985 and began his career with Ricardo as a consultant engineer. He moved to Formula One in 1988 with McLaren as a design engineer, later working within the race team before returning to a factory-based research and development role, ultimately becoming a project engineer. In 1997 he moved to Tyrrell Racing, followed by further senior engineering positions with Honda and Jordan Grand Prix.

Cooney joined Renault F1 Team in 2002 as part of the Advanced Projects Group, where he worked on a number of long-term technical initiatives and became KERS Project Manager, overseeing the development and integration of hybrid energy-recovery systems. Cooney later led early integration work between Enstone and Viry-Châtillon ahead of the introduction of Formula One’s 2014 hybrid power units.

In 2013 Cooney was appointed Engineering Director at the Enstone team during its Lotus ownership, a role he continued following Renault’s reacquisition of the operation in 2015. He held this role until May 2019 when he was moved to be Chief Engineer, Powertrain. He eventually left Enstone in August 2022 and is currently working as an engineering consultant for the Cadillac Formula One Team.
