= Martin Tolliday =

British engineer

- Occupation: Engineer
- Years active: 1992–2024
- Known for: Formula One Engineer

Martin Tolliday is a retired British Formula One engineer. He is best known for being the chief designer at Lotus F1 Team and Renault F1 Team between 2011 and 2020.

== Career ==
Tolliday studied mechanical engineering at Oxford Brookes University. After graduating, he began his engineering career working on mobile cranes, flight simulators and Group C sports car racing projects, gaining experience across a range of mechanical and structural design disciplines.

He began his career in Formula One in 1992 as a junior designer with Benetton Formula, contributing to chassis design during the team’s championship-winning seasons in 1994 and 1995 with Michael Schumacher. Tolliday later advanced to the role of Head of Mechanical Design within the Enstone based organisation before being appointed assistant chief designer in 2005, the year the team, then competing as the Renault F1 Team, secured its maiden Constructors’ Championship with Fernando Alonso.

In 2011, Tolliday took over from Tim Densham to become chief designer – remaining in the position as the team transitioned into Lotus F1 Team. He was responsible for the overall design process of Formula One cars, maintaining close collaboration with chassis design teams, vehicle performance groups, aerodynamic departments and engine engineers. He remained in this position as Team Enstone became Renault once again.

Tolliday departed the team at the end of 2020 and from 2021 to 2024, he worked with Mercedes-AMG Petronas F1 Team as assistant chief designer on the team’s America’s Cup sailing project, contributing across all areas of boat design.
