= Renault R.S.20 =

Renault F1 Team's 2020 Formula One racing car

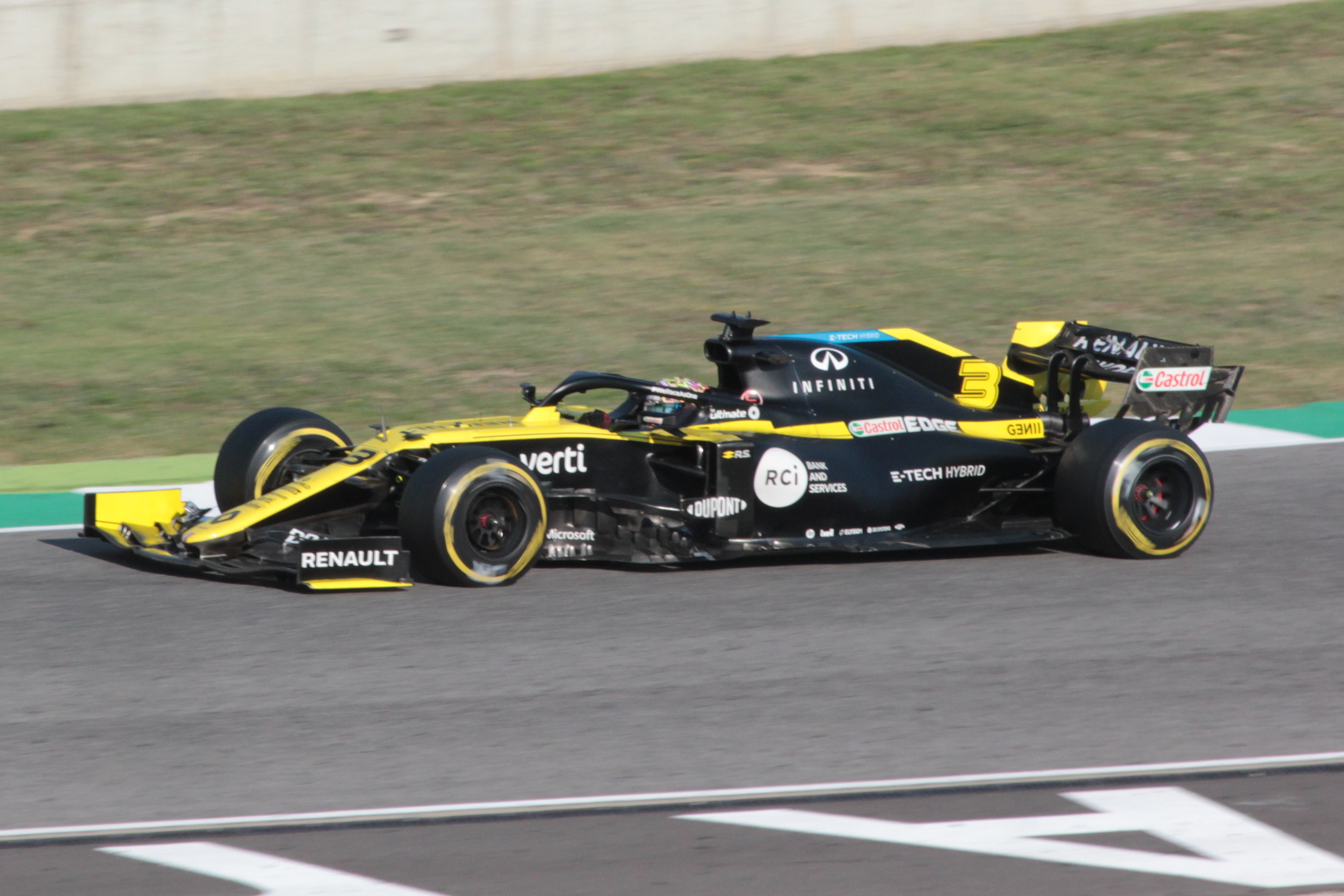
- An R.S.20, driven by Daniel Ricciardo at the 2020 Tuscan Grand Prix.
- Category: Formula One
- Constructor: Renault
- Designers: Nick Chester (Chassis Technical Director); Naoki Tokunaga (Chief Transformation Officer); Matt Harman (Engineering Director); Martin Tolliday (Chief Designer); Simon Virrill (Project Leader); Peter Marshall (Head of Composite Design); Pierre Genon (Head of Performance Systems); Dirk de Beer (Head of Aerodynamics); James Rodgers (Chief Aerodynamicist); Rémi Taffin (Engine Technical Director)
- Predecessor: Renault R.S.19
- Successor: Alpine A521

Technical specifications
- Engine: Mecachrome-built and assembled Renault E-Tech 20 1.6 L (98 cu in) direct injection V6 turbocharged engine limited to 15,000 RPM rear mounted
- Transmission: Renault 8-speed + 1 reverse semi-automatic sequential
- Weight: 743 kg (1,638 lb) with driver, ballast and camera
- Fuel: BP Ultimate
- Lubricants: Castrol
- Tyres: Pirelli P Zero (dry), Pirelli Cinturato (wet)

Competition history
- Notable entrants: Renault DP World F1 Team
- Notable drivers: 3. (Australia) Daniel Ricciardo; 31. (France) Esteban Ocon
- Debut: 2020 Austrian Grand Prix
- Last event: 2020 Abu Dhabi Grand Prix
Races	Wins	Podiums	Poles	F/Laps
17	0	3	0	2

The Renault R.S.20 is a Formula One car designed by the Renault F1 Team to compete in the 2020 Formula One World Championship.

The chassis was designed by Nick Chester, Martin Tolliday, Simon Virrill, Matt Harman, Pierre Genon and Dirk de Beer with Marcin Budkowski overseeing the design and production of the car as executive technical director and Rémi Taffin leading the powertrain design. The car was planned to make its competitive debut at the 2020 Australian Grand Prix, but this was delayed when the next nine events in were cancelled or postponed in response to the COVID-19 pandemic. The R.S.20 made its debut at the 2020 Austrian Grand Prix. It was driven by Daniel Ricciardo and Esteban Ocon in 2020. Ricciardo scored Renault's first podium since it returned to Formula One at the 2020 Eifel Grand Prix, while Ocon scored his first career podium at the 2020 Sakhir Grand Prix.

Because of financial and logistical challenges imposed by the COVID-19 pandemic, an agreement was reached between the FIA and Formula One teams so that 2020 cars would be carried over to 2021, with development of certain areas of the cars frozen after the end of the 2020 season. The R.S.20 was updated for the 2021 season and rebranded as the Alpine A521 after Renault rebranded its Formula One team under the Alpine name.

== Development ==
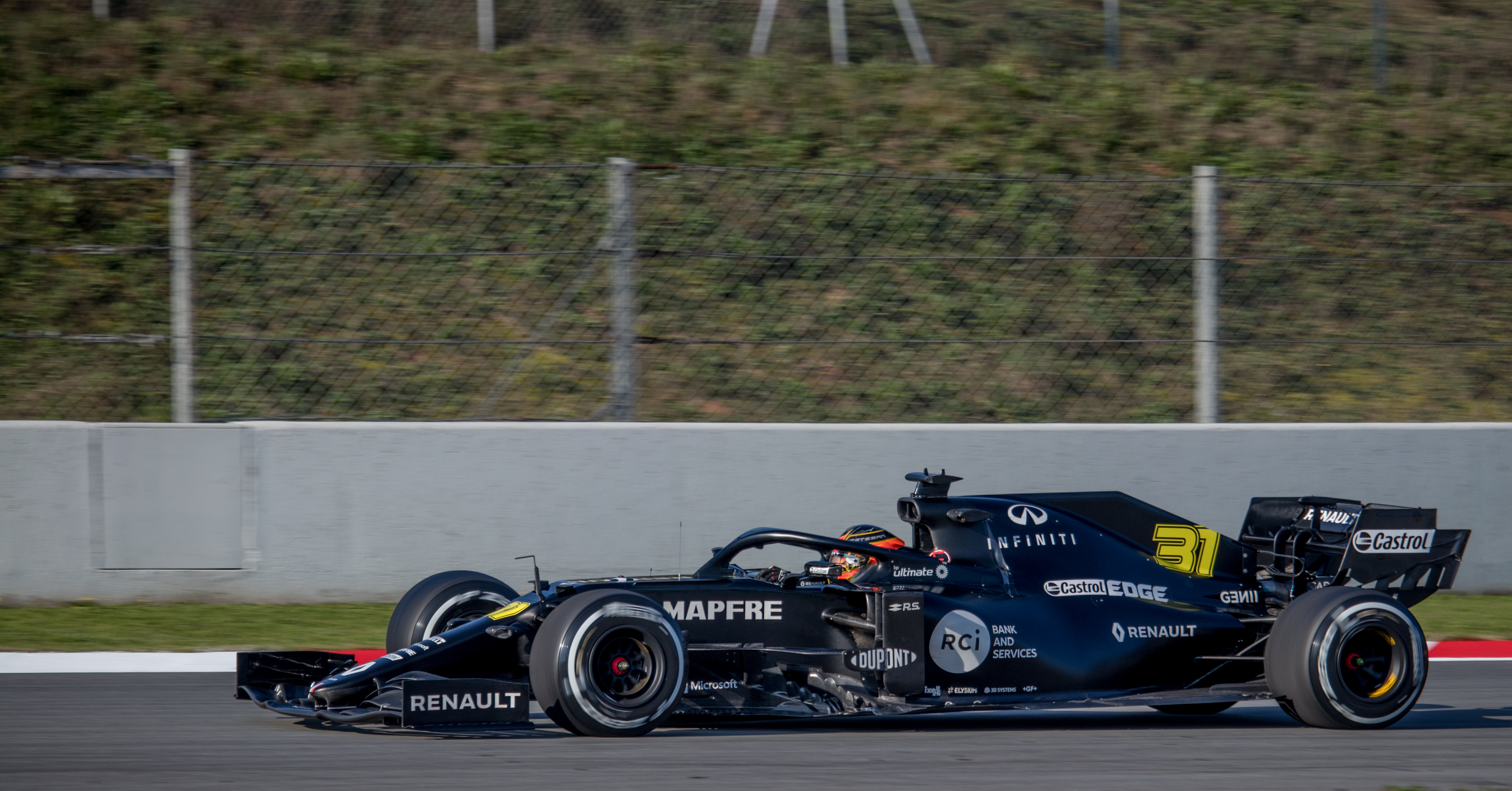
An R.S.20 in its test livery, driven by Esteban Ocon during the 2020 Formula One pre-season testing

The Renault R.S.20 is the last car to have been designed by Nick Chester during his time with the team. Chester was replaced as Technical Director in the 2019-20 off-season by former McLaren Engineering Director Pat Fry. Peter Machin was replaced as Head of Aerodynamics by Williams' former chief aerodynamicist Dirk de Beer, who had returned to Renault after last working for the team in 2013.

== Complete Formula One results ==
(key)

Year	Entrant	Power unit	Tyres	Driver name	Grands Prix																	Points	WCC
2020	Renault DP World F1 Team	Renault; E-Tech 20	P		AUT	STY	HUN	GBR	70A	ESP	BEL	ITA	TUS	RUS	EIF	POR	EMI	TUR	BHR	SKH	ABU	181	5th
2020	Renault DP World F1 Team	Renault; E-Tech 20	P	Esteban Ocon	8	Ret	14	6	8	13	5	8	Ret	7	Ret	8	Ret	11	9	2	9	181	5th
2020	Renault DP World F1 Team	Renault; E-Tech 20	P	Daniel Ricciardo	Ret	8	8	4	14	11	4^{F}	6	4	5	3	9	3	10	7	5	7^{F}	181	5th

Notes

^{†} Driver failed to finish the race but was classified as they had completed over 90% of the winner's race distance.
