= Renault R.S.19 =

2019 Formula One racing car

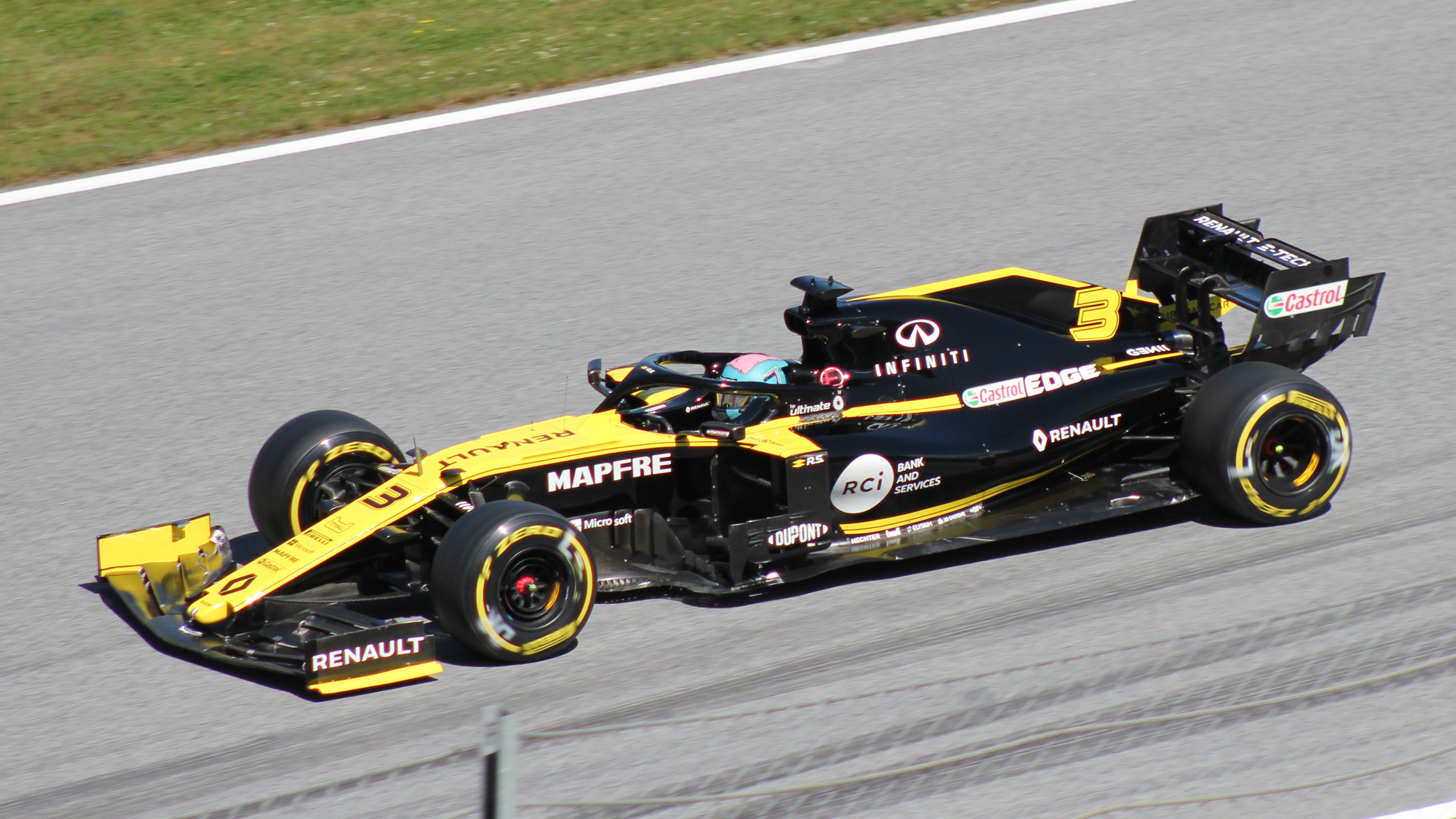
- Daniel Ricciardo driving the R.S.19 during the Austrian Grand Prix
- Category: Formula One
- Constructor: Renault
- Designers: Nick Chester (Chassis Technical Director); Naoki Tokunaga (Chief Transformation Officer); Chris Cooney (Engineering Director); Martin Tolliday (Chief Designer); Simon Virrill (Project Leader); Matt Harman (Chief Engineer); Pierre Genon (Head of Performance Systems); Peter Machin (Head of Aerodynamics); Rémi Taffin (Engine Technical Director)
- Predecessor: Renault R.S.18
- Successor: Renault R.S.20

Technical specifications
- Length: 5,480 mm (216 in)
- Width: 2,000 mm (79 in)
- Height: 950 mm (37 in)
- Axle track: 1,600 mm (63 in)
- Engine: Mecachrome-built and assembled Renault E-Tech 19 1.6 L (98 cu in) direct injection V6 turbocharged engine limited to 15,000 RPM
- Electric motor: Renault kinetic and thermal energy recovery systems
- Transmission: Eight-speed semi-automatic sequential carbon gearbox with reverse gears
- Power: Around 1000HP in qualifying
- Weight: 743 kg (1,638 lb) with driver, ballast and camera
- Fuel: BP Ultimate
- Lubricants: Castrol EDGE
- Brakes: Carbon disks and pads
- Tyres: Pirelli P Zero (dry); Pirelli Cinturato (wet); OZ forged magnesium wheels: 13"

Competition history
- Notable entrants: Renault F1 Team
- Notable drivers: 3. (Australia) Daniel Ricciardo; 27. (Germany) Nico Hülkenberg
- Debut: 2019 Australian Grand Prix
- Last event: 2019 Abu Dhabi Grand Prix
| Races | Wins | Podiums | Poles | F/Laps |
|---|---|---|---|---|
| 21 | 0 | 0 | 0 | 0 |

The Renault R.S.19 is a Formula One racing car designed and constructed by the Renault F1 Team to compete during the 2019 FIA Formula One World Championship. The chassis was designed by Nick Chester, Chris Cooney, Martin Tolliday, Simon Virrill, Matt Harman, Pierre Genon and Pete Machin with Marcin Budkowski overseeing the design and production of the car as executive technical director and Rémi Taffin leading the powertrain design. The car was driven by Nico Hülkenberg and Daniel Ricciardo. The car made its competitive debut at the 2019 Australian Grand Prix.

== Season notes ==
For the 2019 season Renault signed Daniel Ricciardo from Red Bull, partnering Nico Hülkenberg on his third season with the team.

A tough first part of the season for Renault saw them only scoring 39 points in the first 12 rounds; 43 less than what they did at the same point in 2018. This resulted them sitting 6th in the Constructors' Championship at the mid-season break.

After Racing Point's protest against Renault's innovative brake balance adjustment system, which didn't break any rule from the technical regulations, but failed to comply with one of the rules written in the sporting regulations ("Driver must drive the car alone and unaided."), the French team was disqualified from the Japanese Grand Prix results. The system automatically changed the brake balance as the car drove around the track. At the end of the season, Renault finished 5th in the Constructors' Championship.

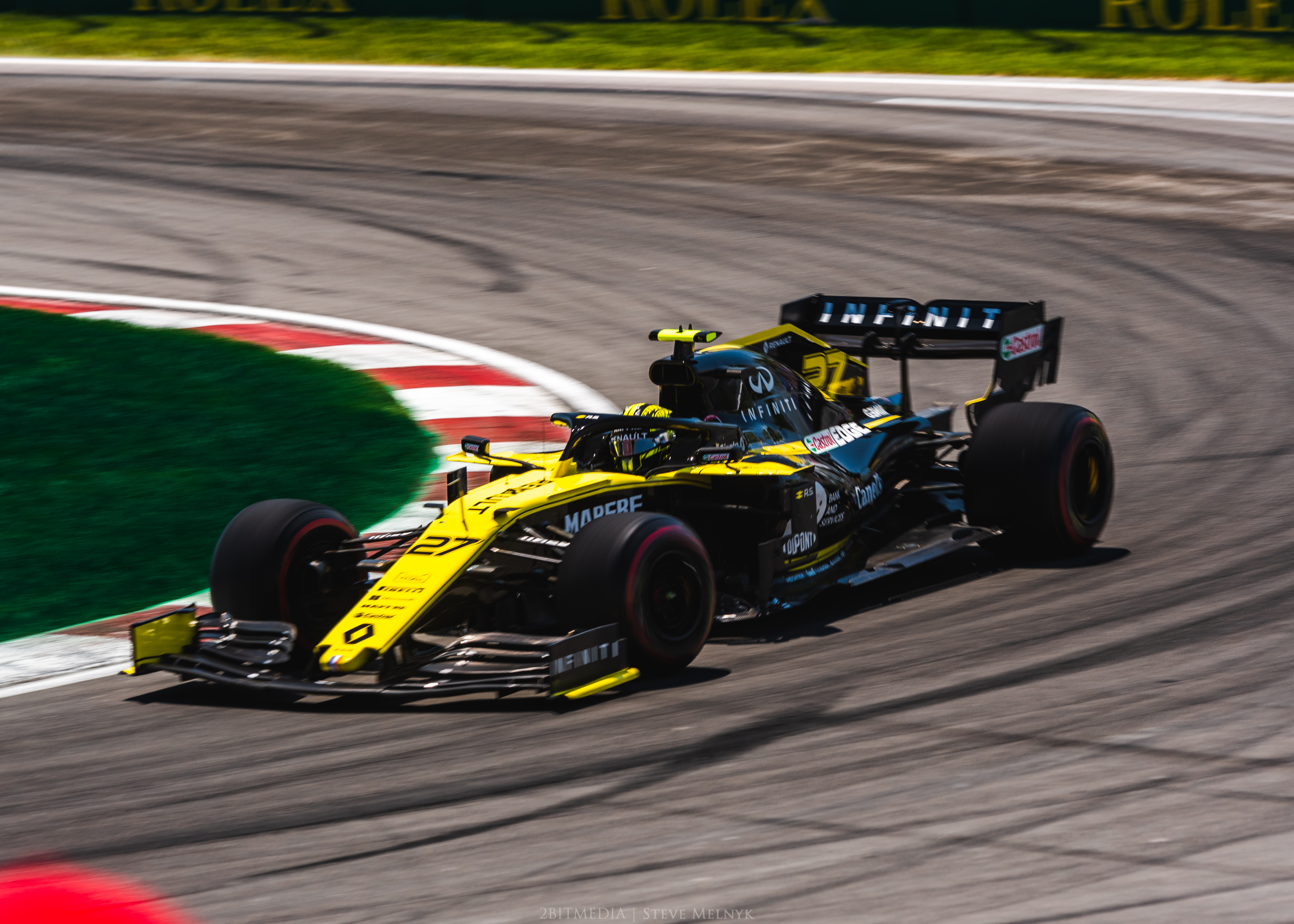
Hülkenberg took seventh at the Canadian Grand Prix

Renault performed particularly well in most power circuits. In Canada, they were comfortably best of the rest, finishing sixth and seventh. Daniel Ricciardo was able to fight and hold off Valtteri Bottas in a much faster Mercedes for a few laps. In the Italian Grand Prix they managed to beat both Red Bulls and Ferrari driver Sebastian Vettel (although helped by the fact that he spun in the early stages of the race), to take a comfortable 4th and 5th.

== Design and development ==
Renault's managing director Cyril Abiteboul said that the gains they made in the engine side were the biggest since 2016. The team brought new updates to the car throughout the season. One of the biggest they got was the update package for the French Grand Prix, which failed to provide the expected leap in performance.

Although the engine's performance provided Renault with some positive results at circuits where engine power was vital, such as at the Italian Grand Prix, poor aerodynamics and reliability issues lead to the team being unable to escape the midfield, with 8 races in which neither driver achieved points.

At the end of the season, Renault F1 Team announced changes to the aerodynamic department of their team as a result of the R.S.19's failures. Chassis Technical Director Nick Chester would leave the team, with former Ferrari and McLaren chassis engineer Pat Fry and former Williams and Ferrari aerodynamicist Dirk de Beer to join the team.

== Livery ==
The livery was similar to the previous season's design with subtle changes.

The team paid tribute to Anthoine Hubert, who was killed during the Formula 2 championship in Belgium by bearing his name on the rear wing endplate.

== Complete Formula One results ==
(key)

| Year | Entrant | Engine | Tyres | Drivers | Grands Prix | | | | | | | | | | | | | | | | | | | | | Points | WCC |
| Year | Entrant | Engine | Tyres | Drivers | AUS | BHR | CHN | AZE | ESP | MON | CAN | FRA | AUT | GBR | GER | HUN | BEL | ITA | SIN | RUS | JPN | MEX | USA | BRA | ABU | Points | WCC |
|---|---|---|---|---|---|---|---|---|---|---|---|---|---|---|---|---|---|---|---|---|---|---|---|---|---|---|---|
| 2019 | Renault F1 Team | Renault E-Tech 19 | P | Nico Hülkenberg | 7 | 17^{†} | Ret | 14 | 13 | 13 | 7 | 8 | 13 | 10 | Ret | 12 | 8 | 5 | 9 | 10 | DSQ | 10 | 9 | 15 | 12 | 91 | 5th |
| 2019 | Renault F1 Team | Renault E-Tech 19 | P | Daniel Ricciardo | Ret | 18^{†} | 7 | Ret | 12 | 9 | 6 | 11 | 12 | 7 | Ret | 14 | 14 | 4 | 14 | Ret | DSQ | 8 | 6 | 6 | 11 | 91 | 5th |

^{†} Driver failed to finish the race, but was classified as they had completed over 90% of the winner's race distance.
