= Daniel Ricciardo =

Australian racing driver (born 1989)

Daniel Ricciardo AM
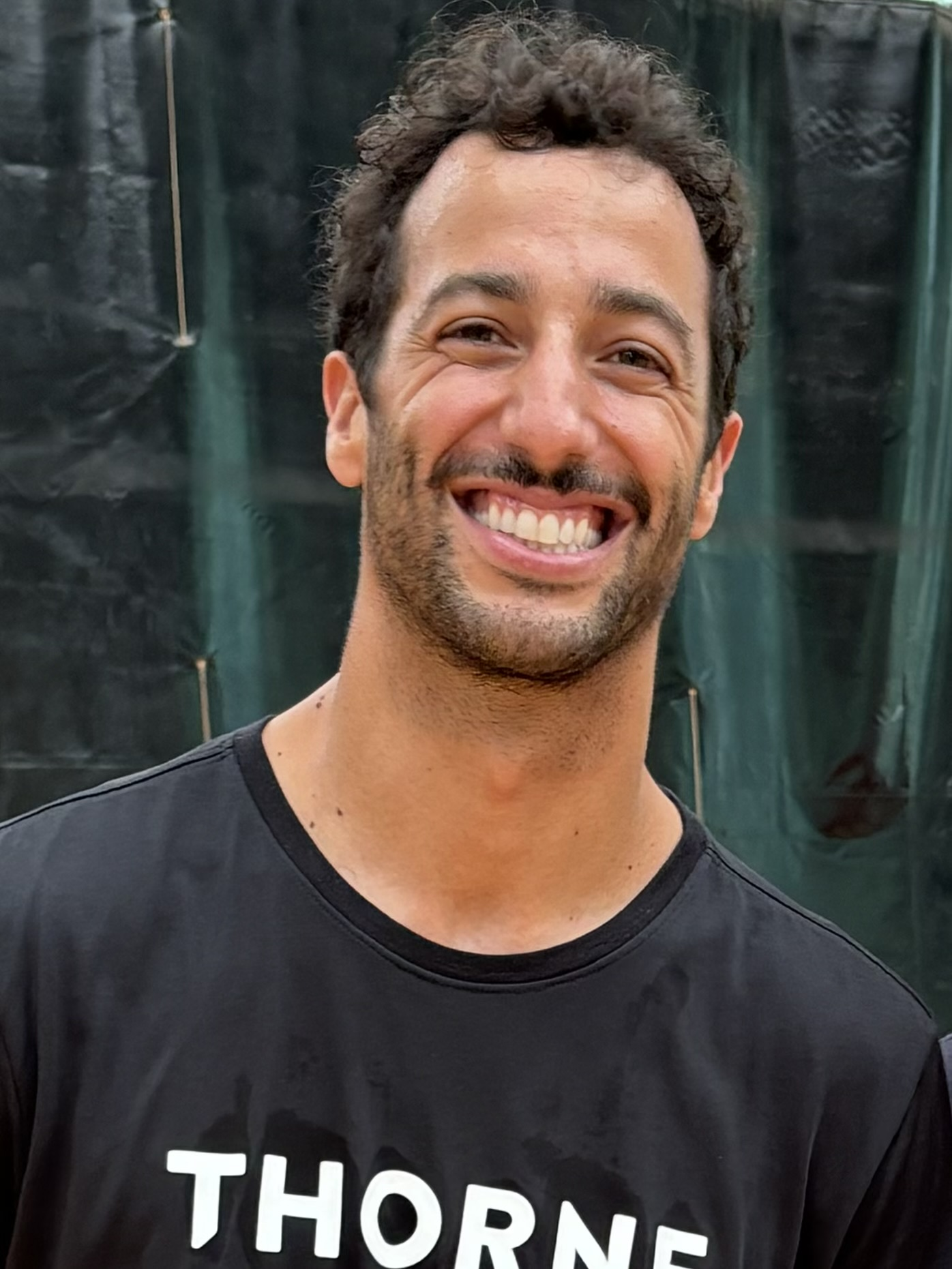
- Ricciardo in 2024
- Born: Daniel Joseph Ricciardo; 1 July 1989 (age 37); Perth, Western Australia, Australia
- Awards: Full list

Formula One World Championship career
- Nationality: (Australia) Australian
- Active years: 2011–2024
- Team(s): HRT, Toro Rosso, Red Bull, Renault, McLaren, AlphaTauri, RB
- Car number: 3
- Entries: 258 (257 starts)
- Championships: 0
- Wins: 8
- Podiums: 32
- Career points: 1329
- Pole positions: 3
- Fastest laps: 17
- First entry: 2011 British Grand Prix
- First win: 2014 Canadian Grand Prix
- Last win: 2021 Italian Grand Prix
- Last entry: 2024 Singapore Grand Prix

Previous series
- 2009–2011; 2009; 2008; 2007–2008; 2007; 2006; 2005: Formula Renault 3.5; British F3; Formula Renault WEC; Formula Renault Eurocup; Italian Formula Renault; Formula BMW Asia; WA Formula Ford

Championship titles
- 2009; 2008: British F3; Formula Renault WEC

Daniel Joseph Ricciardo (/rɪˈkɑːrdoʊ/ rik-AR-doh, Italian: [ritˈtʃardo]; born 1 July 1989) is an Australian former racing driver who competed in Formula One from 2011 to 2024. Nicknamed "the Honey Badger", (Note: Ricciardo is nicknamed the Honey Badger; he explained that he embraced the animal for its fearless qualities, which mirrored his aggressive racing style.) Ricciardo won eight Formula One Grands Prix across 14 seasons.

Born and raised in Perth to Italian-Australian parents, Ricciardo began competitive kart racing at age nine. Graduating to junior formulae in 2005, Ricciardo debuted in his regional Formula Ford championship. He won his first title at the 2008 Formula Renault 2.0 WEC with SG Formula, before winning the 2009 British Formula 3 Championship with Carlin. He then progressed to Formula Renault 3.5, finishing runner-up to Mikhail Aleshin by two points in his rookie season. Ricciardo made his Formula One debut at the 2011 British Grand Prix with HRT as part of the Red Bull Junior Team, replacing Narain Karthikeyan for the remainder of 2011. He earned a full-time drive with Toro Rosso in 2012 and 2013 alongside Jean-Éric Vergne, scoring several points finishes in each. Ricciardo was promoted to Red Bull in 2014, replacing the retiring Mark Webber to partner defending four-time World Drivers' Champion Sebastian Vettel.

In his first season with Red Bull under Renault power, (Note: Renault engines used by Red Bull were rebadged as TAG Heuer from 2016 to 2018.) Ricciardo finished third in the championship, taking his maiden victory at the Canadian Grand Prix, with further wins in Hungary and Belgium. After a winless 2015 campaign for Red Bull, he took his maiden pole position in Monaco and won the Malaysian Grand Prix in 2016, clinching third overall again. He took further wins for Red Bull at the Azerbaijan Grand Prix in 2017, as well as the Chinese and Monaco Grands Prix in 2018. Ricciardo signed with Renault in 2019, finishing a season-best fourth in Italy. He retained his seat for his 2020 campaign, achieving multiple podiums and finishing fifth overall. He then joined McLaren in 2021 to partner Lando Norris, achieving his only victory and podium for the team at the Italian Grand Prix. Following inconsistent performances, Ricciardo left McLaren at the end of 2022 and returned to Red Bull as a reserve driver in 2023. From the Hungarian Grand Prix onwards, he replaced Nyck de Vries at AlphaTauri; he retained his seat for their 2024 campaign as RB, but was replaced by Liam Lawson after the Singapore Grand Prix.

Ricciardo achieved eight race wins, three pole positions, 17 fastest laps, and 32 podiums in Formula One. Upon his retirement in 2025, he became the global ambassador for Ford Racing. Ricciardo was appointed a Member of the Order of Australia in the 2022 Australia Day Honours.

== Early life ==
Daniel Joseph Ricciardo was born on 1 July 1989 in Perth, Western Australia, to Italian-Australian parents. His father, Giuseppe "Joe" Ricciardo, was born in Ficarra (Messina), but relocated to Australia with his family at age seven. Ricciardo's mother, Grace Pulitanò was born in Australia, but had parents originally from Casignana (Calabria). Ricciardo also has a sister; Michelle. Growing up in Duncraig, Ricciardo's earliest memories of motorsports were of his father racing at the nearby Barbagallo Raceway in Wanneroo. Raised Catholic, he attended high school at Newman College. He started karting at the age of 9.

== Junior racing career ==
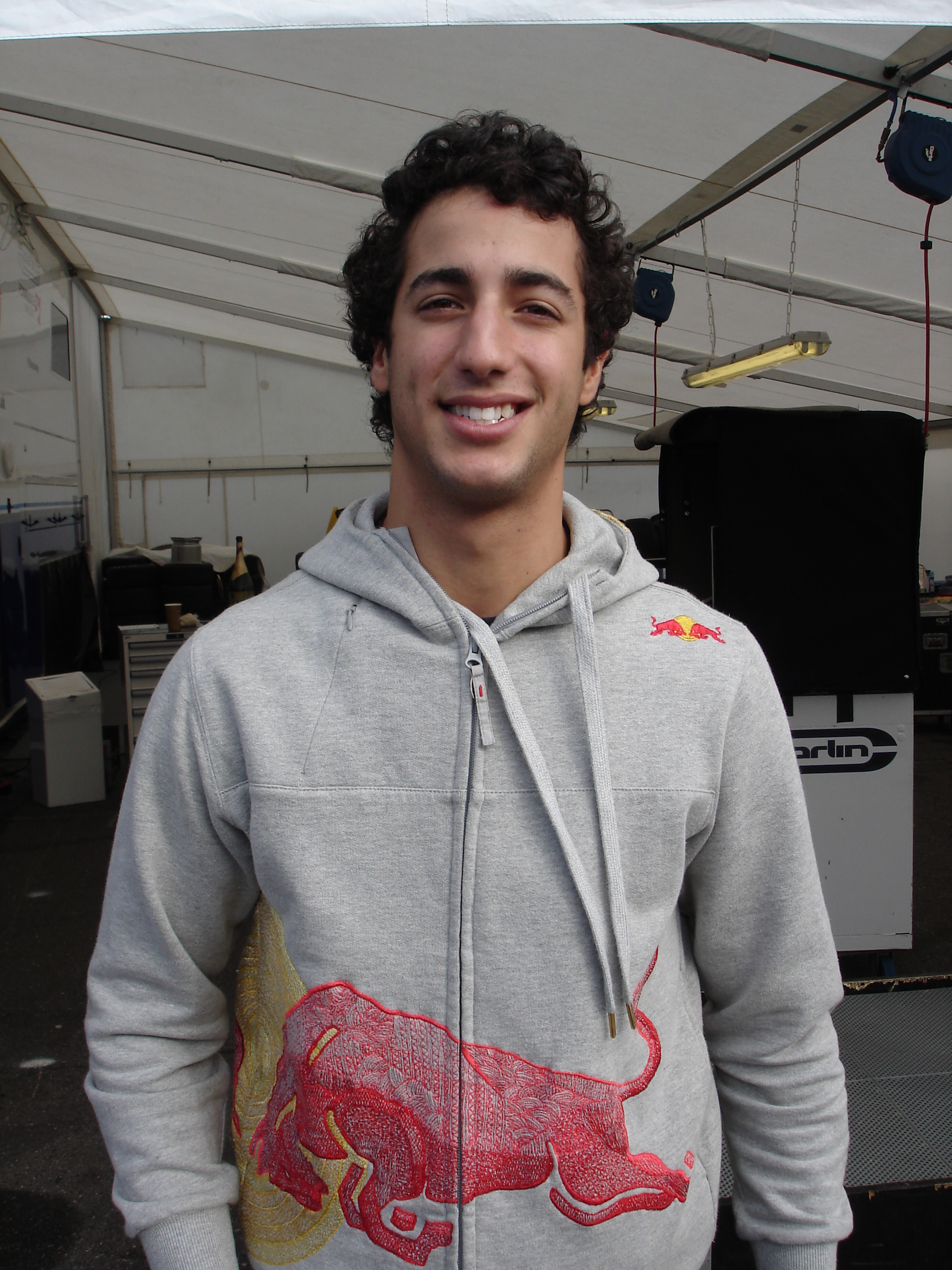
Ricciardo in October 2009

=== Karting ===
Ricciardo started karting at the age of nine as a member of the Tiger Kart Club (TKC) and entered numerous karting events.

=== Lower formulae ===
In 2005, Ricciardo entered the Western Australian Formula Ford championship driving a fifteen-year-old Van Diemen, finishing eighth by season's end.

Towards the end of the 2005 season, Ricciardo took a leased thirteen-year-old Van Diemen across to Sandown Raceway in Melbourne to compete at the national Formula Ford series, but his aging car was uncompetitive, and he finished 16th, 17th and retired during the weekend's three races.

That year, Ricciardo was more successful in karts, in which he was crowned the Australian champion. His prizes for the win included a pass to the 2006 Australian Grand Prix at Albert Park, Melbourne, where the then-16-year-old savoured a taste of his own future by chatting unnoticed with Italian driver Jarno Trulli and Miss Universe 2004, Jennifer Hawkins.

After finishing sixth in 2007 Formula Renault 2.0 Italia, Ricciardo was selected by Red Bull Junior Team.

=== Formula Three ===
During the mid-part of the 2008 season, Ricciardo made his Formula Three debut at the Nürburgring, joining SG Formula's Formula 3 Euro Series team. Despite only a short amount of experience in the car, Ricciardo qualified in eighth for the first race, which later converted into sixth in the race after James Jakes and Christian Vietoris stalled on the grid. But he struggled in the reverse-grid race, finishing just fifteenth.

Ricciardo moved to the British Formula 3 Championship for the 2009 season driving for Carlin Motorsport. Ricciardo continued his partnership with Carlin by heading to the Macau Grand Prix with the team.

=== Formula Renault 3.5 Series ===
On 30 October 2009, Ricciardo was signed by Tech 1 to compete in the 2010 season. He had competed with the team at the Autódromo Internacional do Algarve in Portugal in 2009 and was the teammate to Brendon Hartley, another driver who drove for Tech 1 over the season.

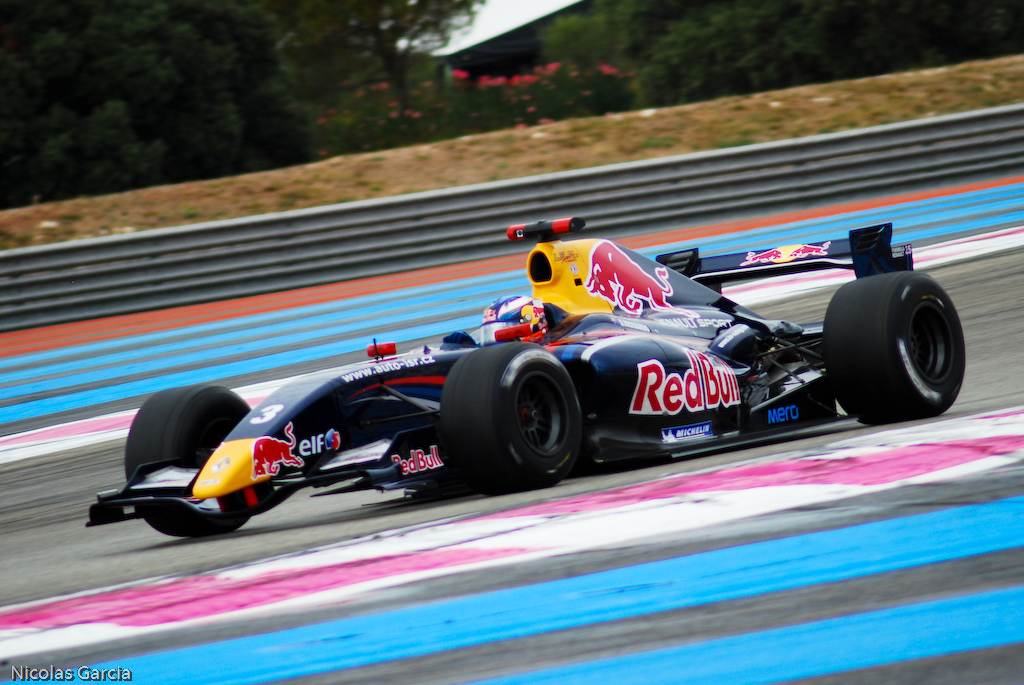
Ricciardo in the 2011 Formula Renault 3.5 Series at the Circuit Paul Ricard

Following a minor incident during a mountain bike exercise, Ricciardo was forced to miss the second test of the 2010 season, but went on to take pole position for both races at the season-opening round of the 2010 season in Alcañiz, Spain. He finished third and second in the races respectively, to leave himself at the head of the championship standings. Two weeks later, at the Spa-Francorchamps circuit, Ricciardo was relegated to last on the grid after being deemed to have hindered the laps of other drivers. In the next two races, he finished 13th and fifth respectively – coming second in the latter, until many of the front-runners were given penalties for infringing the parc ferme rules before the race. One week later, in Monte Carlo, Ricciardo secured his third pole position of the season, finishing three-tenths of a second ahead of championship rival Stefano Coletti. He secured his first win at the following race, one place ahead of Coletti. Ricciardo went on to secure two more wins at the Hungaroring and at the Hockenheimring in commanding fashion. Following Ricciardo's sixth pole from 12 races, Tech 1 team boss, Simon Abadie, praised his driver's efforts greatly, saying, "I am happy, and happy for Daniel because six poles in 12 races is good going," and later stated his team's ambitions for success, by telling Autosport correspondent Peter Mills, "I really hopes Daniel wins the championship."

At the first race at the Silverstone circuit, Ricciardo was involved in a spectacular incident with pole-sitter Jon Lancaster, in which Ricciardo was sent into a barrel roll, eventually landing on his wheels. The crash saw the end of his race, with teammate Jean-Éric Vergne becoming the eventual winner, following disqualifications. Securing pole for the second race of the weekend, Ricciardo spent much of the race leading the pack by upwards of three seconds. However, braking issues in the second half of the event meant that, on the final lap, championship-rival Esteban Guerrieri was able to pass the Tech 1 racer.

Going into the final round of the season, Ricciardo sat just three points behind championship leader Mikhail Aleshin and 13 ahead of third-place man Esteban Guerrieri. Managing his 8th pole of the season, Ricciardo managed a lights-to-flag victory, setting the fastest lap and placing himself equal first with one race remaining. After securing second place on the grid for the second race of the weekend, Ricciardo managed to hold position until the pit stops, where he was successfully 'jumped' by two of his rivals, including teammate Vergne. With only two laps left in the race and struggling for pace, Ricciardo was overtaken by championship rival Aleshin. Finishing in that order, Ricciardo failed to secure the title in his debut year, losing out to Mikhail Aleshin by only two points.

In 2011, Ricciardo raced for ISR Racing prior to his HRT call-up.

== Formula One career ==
=== Red Bull test driver (2009–2011) ===
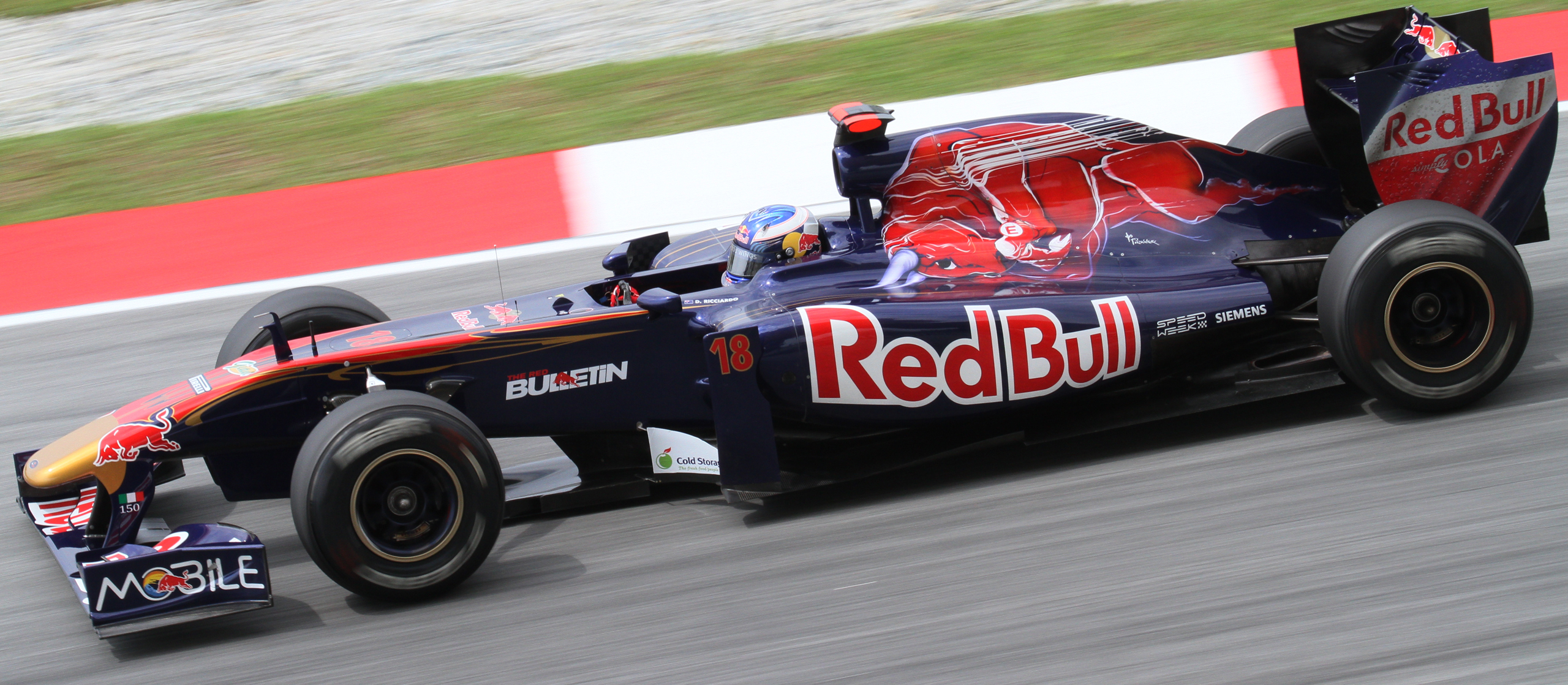
Ricciardo as Scuderia Toro Rosso's third driver at the 2011 Malaysian Grand Prix

Ricciardo made his track debut at the wheel of a Formula One car when he tested for Red Bull Racing at the young drivers' test at Circuito de Jerez over three days, starting on 1 December 2009. On the final day of testing, he clocked the fastest time of the test by over a second. This placed him as the only driver to go into the 1:17 bracket. Red Bull Racing's team manager Christian Horner suggested that Ricciardo may replace his 2010 World Series teammate Hartley as the team's test and reserve driver. Ricciardo and Hartley went on to share test and reserve duties for both Red Bull and sister team Scuderia Toro Rosso until Hartley was removed from the Red Bull Junior Team.

On 11 November 2010, Ricciardo was confirmed as the single driver to represent Red Bull Racing at the end-of-season young drivers' test at the Yas Marina Circuit, on 16–17 November. Ricciardo continued to show his one-lap prowess and dominated the event, with his fastest lap being 1.3 seconds faster than 2010 World Champion Sebastian Vettel's qualifying lap the Saturday before. Days later, Ricciardo was confirmed as Toro Rosso's test and reserve driver for the 2011 season and would take part in the first free practice session of each race weekend. Franz Tost, Toro Rosso team principal stated that "having a hungry youngster on the books will keep our current driver pairing nice and sharp", referring to then Toro Rosso drivers Jaime Alguersuari and Sébastien Buemi.

=== HRT (2011) ===
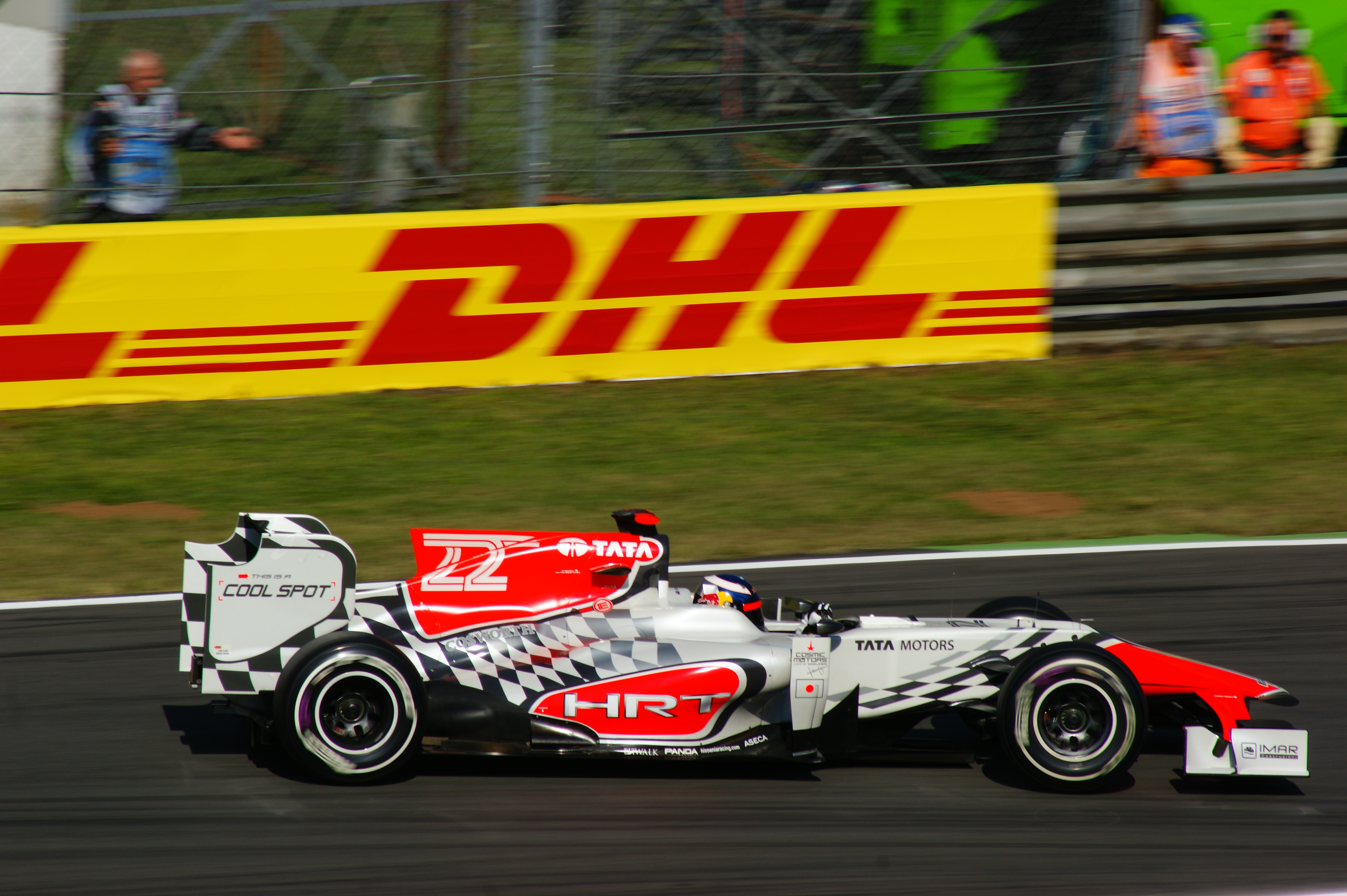
Ricciardo racing for HRT at the 2011 Italian Grand Prix

On 30 June 2011, Ricciardo was loaned out by Red Bull to Hispania Racing (later rebranded HRT), replacing Narain Karthikeyan for the remaining eleven races of the 2011 season and partnering former Red Bull and Toro Rosso driver Vitantonio Liuzzi. (Note: Ricciardo was initially set to give the seat back to Karthikeyan for the Indian Grand Prix to allow Karthikeyan to compete at his home race, however it was ultimately Liuzzi who made way instead.) On the deal, HRT owner José Ramón Carabante commented that he was "proud that the Formula One world champion team has trusted us in their effort of developing their drivers". Ricciardo made his Grand Prix debut at the British Grand Prix, where he qualified and finished last. Despite this, Red Bull advisor Helmut Marko described Ricciardo as "full of potential" and suggested that he would likely one day replace Mark Webber at Red Bull Racing.

Over his eleven races with HRT, Ricciardo recorded a best qualifying position of 21st at the Abu Dhabi Grand Prix, and best race finishes of 18th place at the Hungarian and Indian Grands Prix, leaving him 27th in the World Drivers' Championship. Writing in 2017, Sky Sports praised Ricciardo's efforts in 2011, judging him to have "[took] the fight" to teammate Liuzzi.

=== Toro Rosso (2012–2013) ===
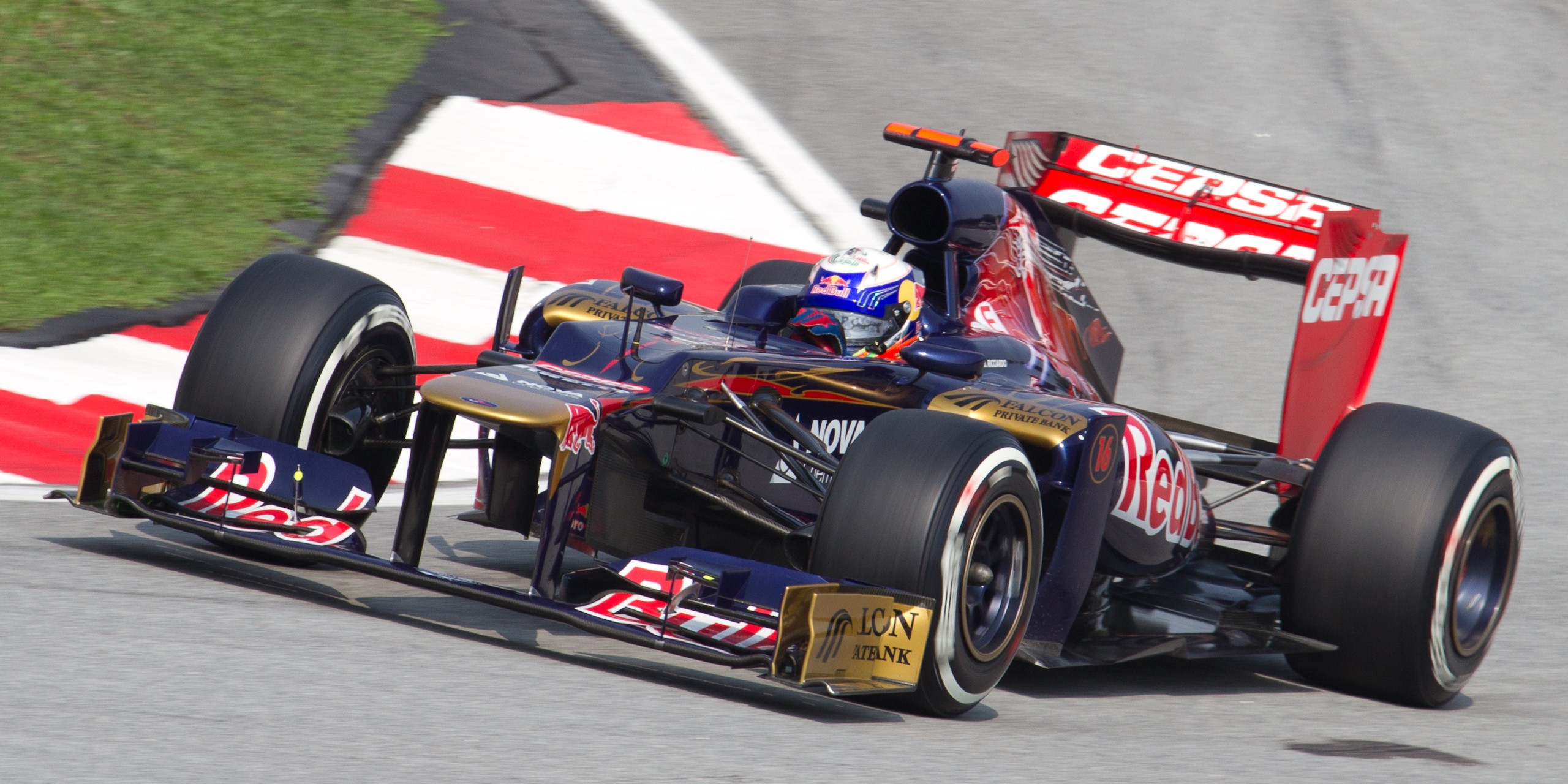
Ricciardo driving for Toro Rosso at the 2012 Malaysian Grand Prix

Ricciardo was promoted to a full-time race seat with Scuderia Toro Rosso for the 2012 season, partnering rookie Jean-Éric Vergne. At the Australian Grand Prix, Ricciardo overtook Vergne late on the last lap to finish ninth, scoring his first two World Championship points. His next points score would not be until eleven races later, where he qualified 16th and finished ninth at the Belgian Grand Prix. This is despite having earlier qualified sixth at the Bahrain Grand Prix; he dropped outside the points after a poor start and front wing damage. Improved results for Ricciardo and the STR7 came in the latter stages of the year, with Ricciardo recording three consecutive points finishes at the Singapore, Japanese and Korean Grands Prix and a tenth-place finish at the Abu Dhabi Grand Prix. In his first full Formula One season, Ricciardo finished 18th in the championship with 10 points, compared to 16 points for teammate Vergne.

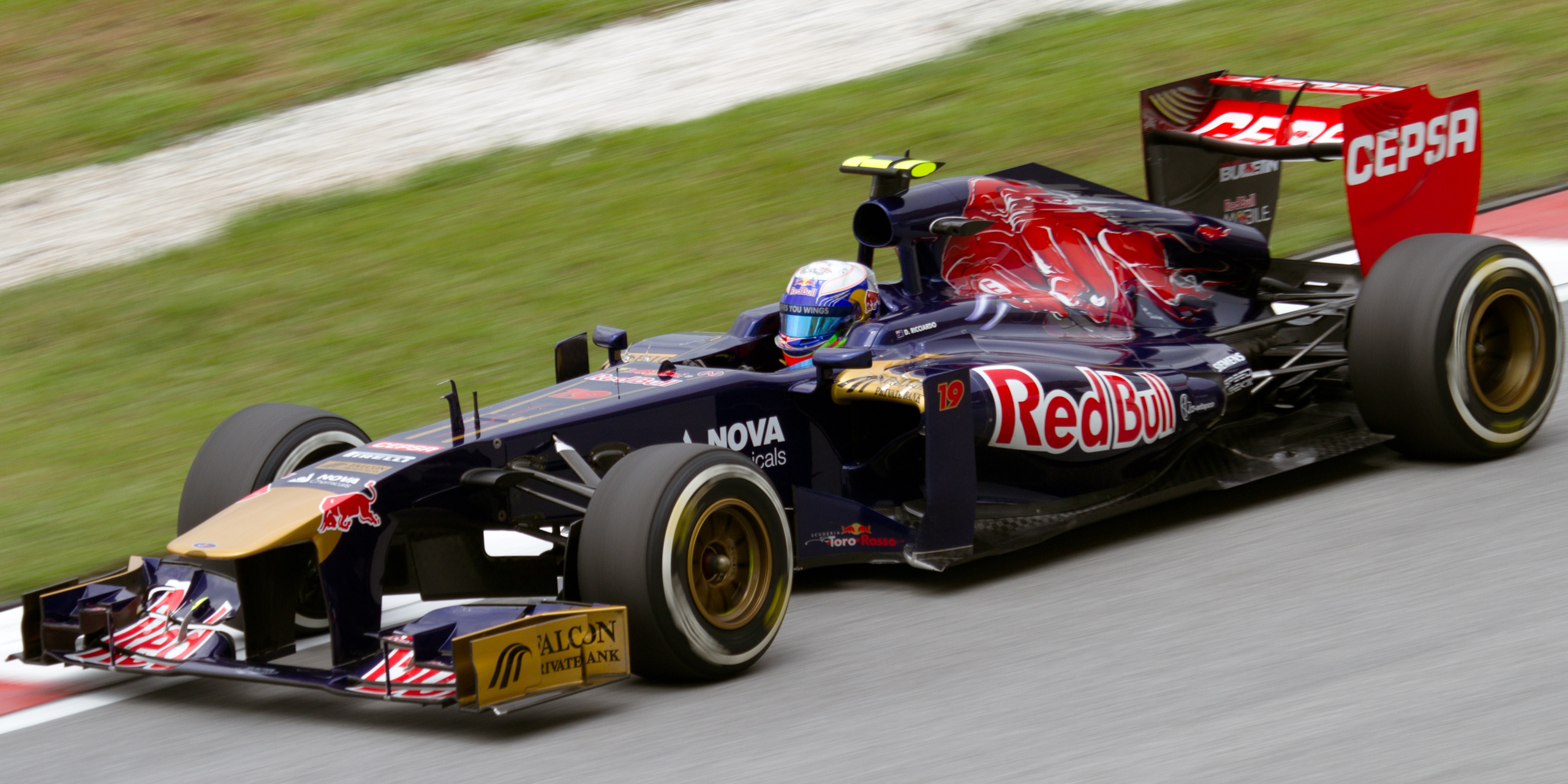
Ricciardo at the 2013 Malaysian Grand Prix

Ricciardo and Vergne continued at Toro Rosso for the 2013 season. Ricciardo remarked that his target was to "beat [Vergne] convincingly" in order to earn a Red Bull Racing seat for 2014. He began the year by not finishing the opening two rounds, both due to exhaust issues. He then scored his best Formula One result thus far with seventh at the Chinese Grand Prix. Further points finishes came at the Spanish and British Grands Prix, with Ricciardo having qualified a career-best fifth at Silverstone Circuit. He again finished seventh at the Italian Grand Prix, having held off Romain Grosjean in the closing laps.

Ricciardo ended the season 14th in the standings with 20 points, ahead of Vergne's total of thirteen. During their time at Toro Rosso, Ricciardo qualified ahead of Vergne at 30 out of 39 races. In September, he was chosen as the successor to the retiring Mark Webber at Red Bull Racing for the 2014 season. Red Bull Racing team principal Christian Horner described Ricciardo as "a big star of the future", and chief technical officer Adrian Newey explained that the team considered an experienced replacement—reports suggested that Kimi Räikkönen was close to signing for the team—but that they ultimately decided to look within their junior roster, of which Ricciardo was the "most promising".

=== Red Bull (2014–2018) ===
==== 2014: Maiden wins ====
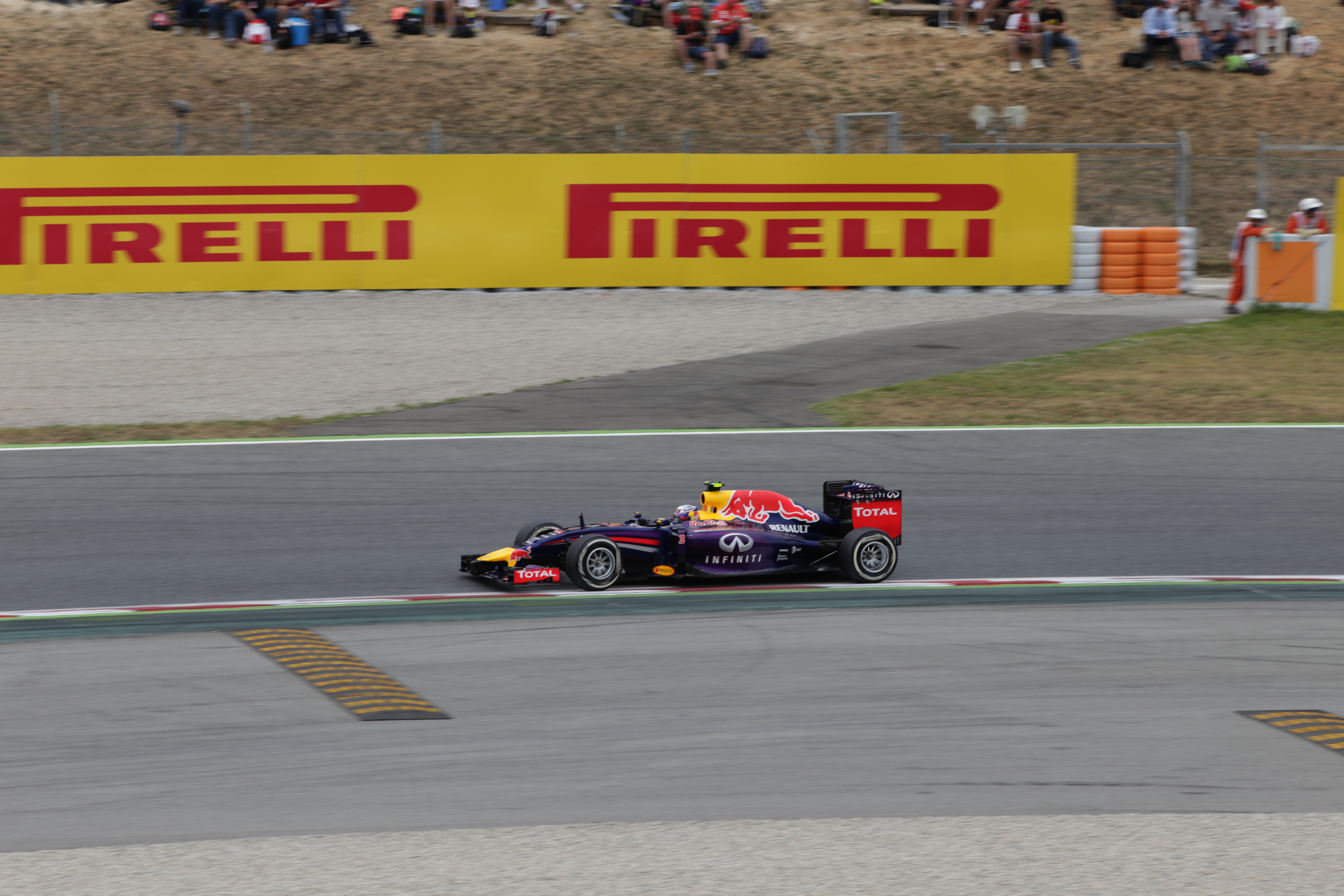
Ricciardo at the 2014 Spanish Grand Prix

Ricciardo partnered reigning four-time world champion Sebastian Vettel for his first season at Red Bull, which he predicted would be "a great challenge". Issues for the team during pre-season testing sessions put doubt on their ability to win a fifth consecutive championship, with Red Bull advisor Helmut Marko commenting that the team was only aiming to "survive" the season-opening Australian Grand Prix. At his first Grand Prix with Red Bull, Ricciardo qualified second, ahead of Vettel, and finished second behind the Mercedes of Nico Rosberg. However, Ricciardo was later disqualified as his car was judged to have breached regulations on fuel flow. He then retired from the Malaysian Grand Prix after a pit stop error and a wing failure, but recorded his first points of 2014 at the Bahrain Grand Prix, where he finished fourth after starting 13th. He claimed his first Formula One podium five races into the season at the Spanish Grand Prix, and followed this with another third-place finish at the Monaco Grand Prix, where he finished 0.4 seconds behind Lewis Hamilton.

At the Canadian Grand Prix, Ricciardo started sixth and gained three places during the pit stops. In the last four laps, he overtook Sergio Pérez and Nico Rosberg to take the first win of his Formula One career. This made him the fourth Australian to win a Grand Prix in Formula One, joining Jack Brabham, Alan Jones and Mark Webber. The result promoted Ricciardo to third place in the World Drivers' Championship. He later achieved back-to-back victories at the Hungarian Grand Prix, where he overtook Hamilton and Fernando Alonso in the closing laps, and at the Belgian Grand Prix after the Mercedes drivers collided. Further podiums came at the Singapore and United States Grands Prix. He ended the season with a retirement due to suspension failure at the Brazilian Grand Prix and fourth place at the Abu Dhabi Grand Prix despite starting from the pit lane due to running an illegal front wing in qualifying.

Ricciardo ended his first season at Red Bull third in the World Drivers' Championship, having achieved three wins and five other podiums. He scored 238 points to Vettel's 167, and was the only non-Mercedes driver to win a race in 2014. He received widespread praise for his performances, with 2014 champion Lewis Hamilton describing him as "one of the best drivers here" and Fernando Alonso hailing him as "unbelievable" and "very, very smart, very respectful". William Esler of Sky Sports described him as the "standout performer" of the season, and he was ranked as the best driver of 2014 by Jamie Klein of Motorsport.com. For his 2014 performances, Ricciardo won the Laureus World Sports Award for Breakthrough of the Year in April 2015.

==== 2015 ====
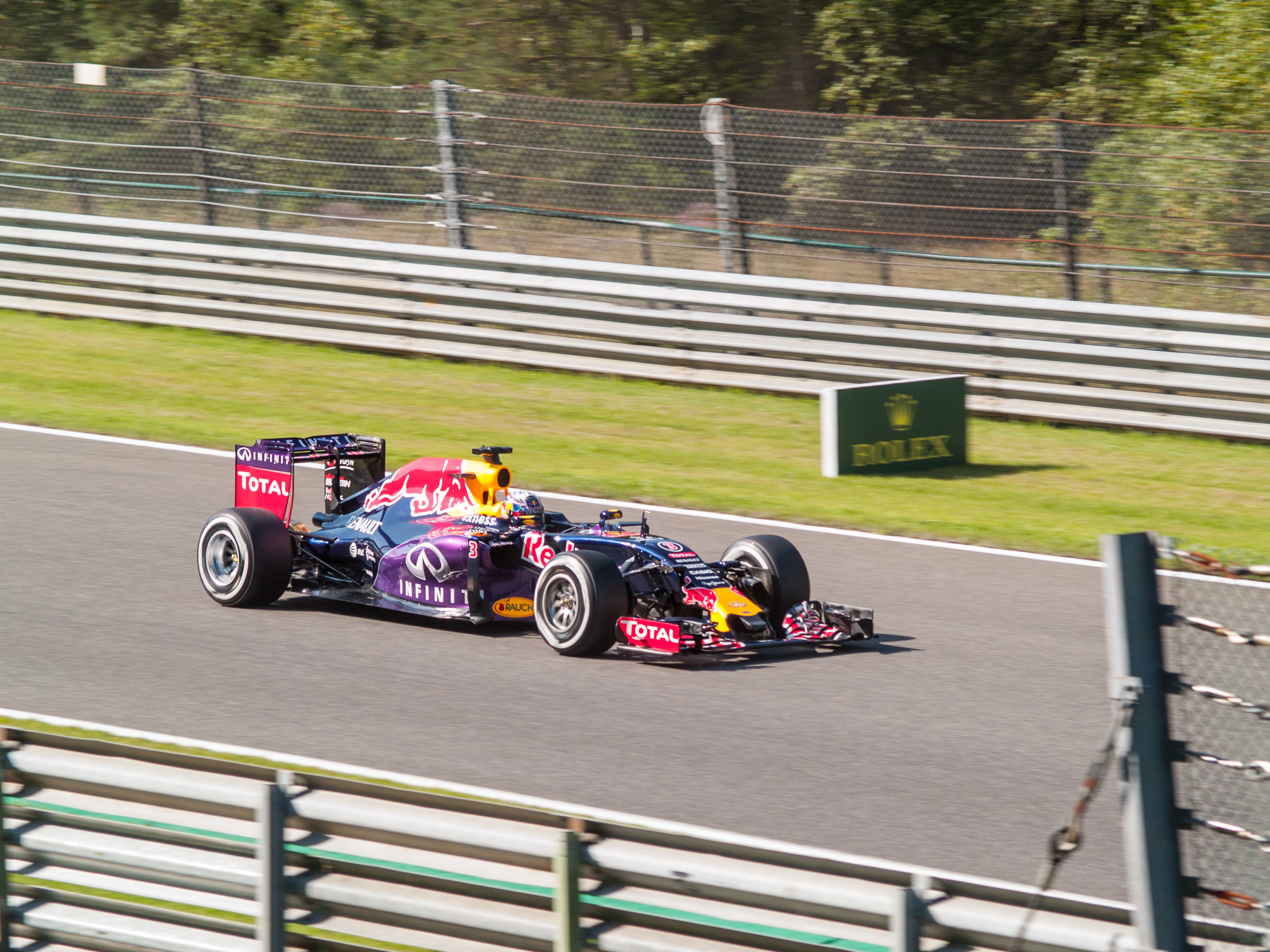
Ricciardo at the 2015 Belgian Grand Prix

For 2015, Ricciardo was partnered at Red Bull by Toro Rosso graduate Daniil Kvyat following Vettel's departure from the team to join Ferrari; team principal Christian Horner opined that Ricciardo's 2014 form was "probably a factor" in Vettel's decision. He finished the opening race at the Australian Grand Prix in sixth, the RB11 seemingly uncompetitive as he finished a lap behind the leaders, whilst teammate Kvyat broke down on the formation lap. Horner described the car's Renault engines as "undriveable" and Newey remarked that there was "no obvious light at the end of the tunnel". Ricciardo's engine failed on the final lap of the Bahrain Grand Prix—whilst running in sixth—forcing him to use his fourth and final engine of the year after only the fourth race. He achieved his first top-five finish of 2015 at the Monaco Grand Prix with fifth place and the fastest lap of the race. Car issues led to a 13th-place finish at the Canadian Grand Prix, followed by both Red Bulls receiving grid penalties for exceeding their engine parts allocations at the Austrian Grand Prix and a retirement with electrical problems at the British Grand Prix.

The team's first podium finish of 2015 came at round ten, the Hungarian Grand Prix. Ricciardo and Nico Rosberg had made contact whilst battling for second place, but Ricciardo was able to finish third behind Kvyat despite stopping for a new front wing. He recorded his second podium of the season at the Singapore Grand Prix, where he qualified and finished second, and set the fastest lap. Ricciardo finished the season with 92 points in eighth place in the championship, compared to 95 points for Kvyat. Red Bull failed to win a race for the first time since 2008, but Ricciardo commented that the season's challenges had made him "a more complete driver". Despite finishing behind Kvyat in the championship, Ricciardo qualified ahead of his teammate at twelve of the nineteen races.

==== 2016: Maiden pole position ====
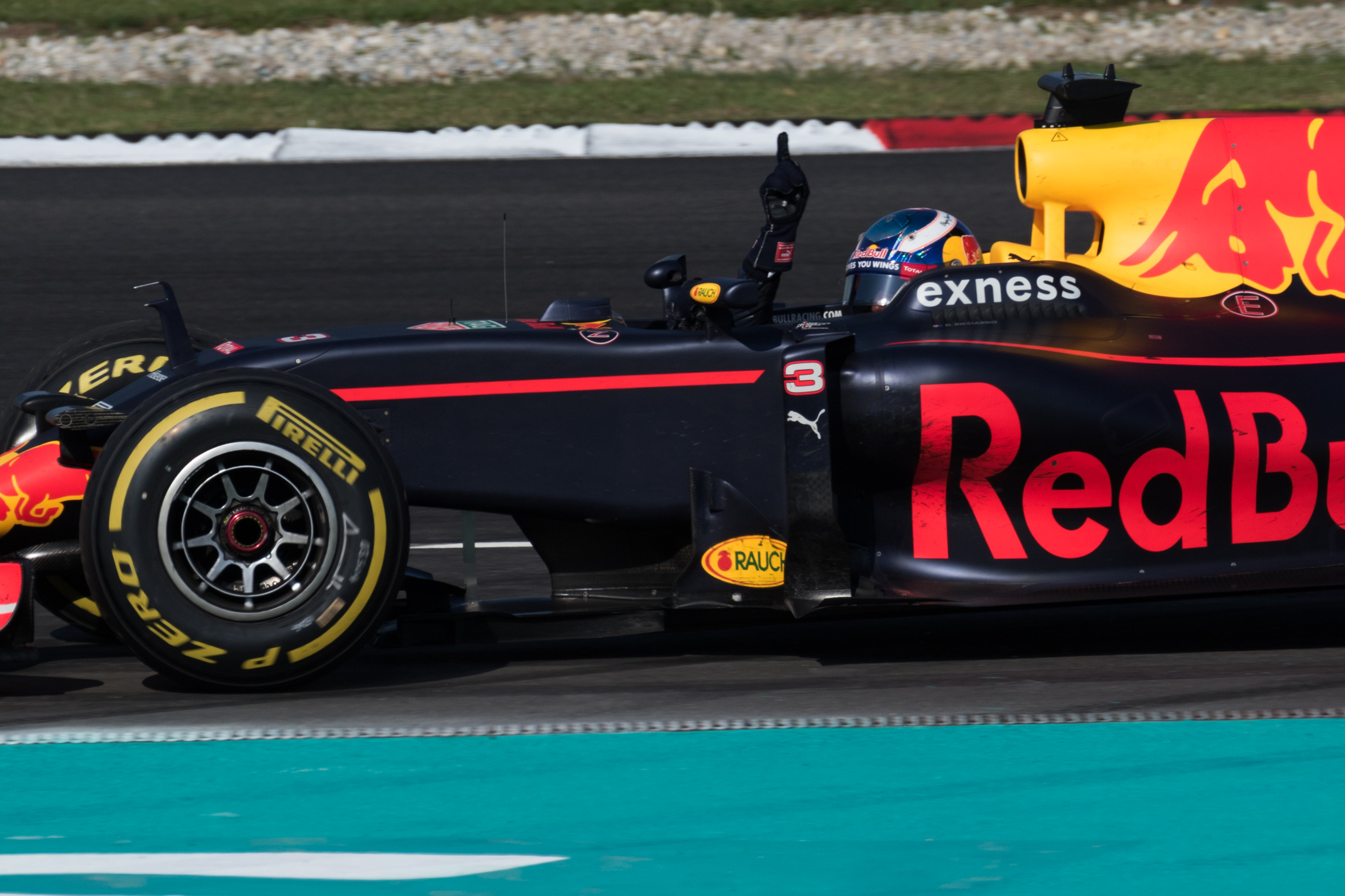
Ricciardo after winning the 2016 Malaysian Grand Prix

Ricciardo began the 2016 season with fourth place at the Australian Grand Prix. The new RB12 appeared more competitive than its predecessor; Ricciardo told the media that despite still being behind the leading Mercedes and Ferrari cars, the RB12 was "not far off". He qualified second and led early on at the Chinese Grand Prix before a tyre failure dropped him back. He described his recovery to fourth as the best race of his career. He gained a new teammate for the Spanish Grand Prix in 18-year-old Max Verstappen after Kvyat was demoted to Toro Rosso. Despite initially leading the race when the Mercedes drivers collided on the first lap, a three-stop strategy and another tyre puncture left him fourth in the race whilst Verstappen claimed victory. Ricciardo scored his first pole position at the Monaco Grand Prix and led the early wet stages of the race. However, after a very long pitstop in which his team took nearly 40 seconds to ready a set of tyres, he lost the race lead to Lewis Hamilton and finished second. Ricciardo was notably upset after the race result, saying: "Two weekends in a row I've been screwed now. It sucks. It hurts."

Ricciardo returned to the podium five races later at the Hungarian Grand Prix and followed this with second-place finishes at the German and Belgian Grands Prix. These results promoted him to third in the standings behind the leading Mercedes drivers. He qualified and finished second at the Singapore Grand Prix, less than half a second behind winner Nico Rosberg. At the Malaysian Grand Prix, he benefited from a collision between Rosberg and Sebastian Vettel and a late-race engine failure for Hamilton to win the race, his first victory in over two years. Christian Horner praised Ricciardo and Verstappen for their mutual respect, the two having battled over second place earlier in the race. Ricciardo later sealed third place in the championship with two consecutive podiums at the United States and Mexican Grands Prix.

Ricciardo scored a total of 256 points during the season—compared to 212 in total for his Red Bull teammates—taking a win, seven further podiums, his first pole position and four fastest laps. He was acclaimed for his performances; RaceFans, Motorsport.com and Mark Hughes at Motor Sport magazine rated him the best driver of 2016. On his partnership with Verstappen, Ricciardo credited him with forcing "a step up" in his own driving. Ricciardo became known during the season for his "shoey" celebration, first performed at the German Grand Prix, where he would pour champagne into his racing boot and drink out of it. He persuaded others to drink from the boot, including podium interviewer Mark Webber, team principal Horner and his fellow drivers.

==== 2017 ====
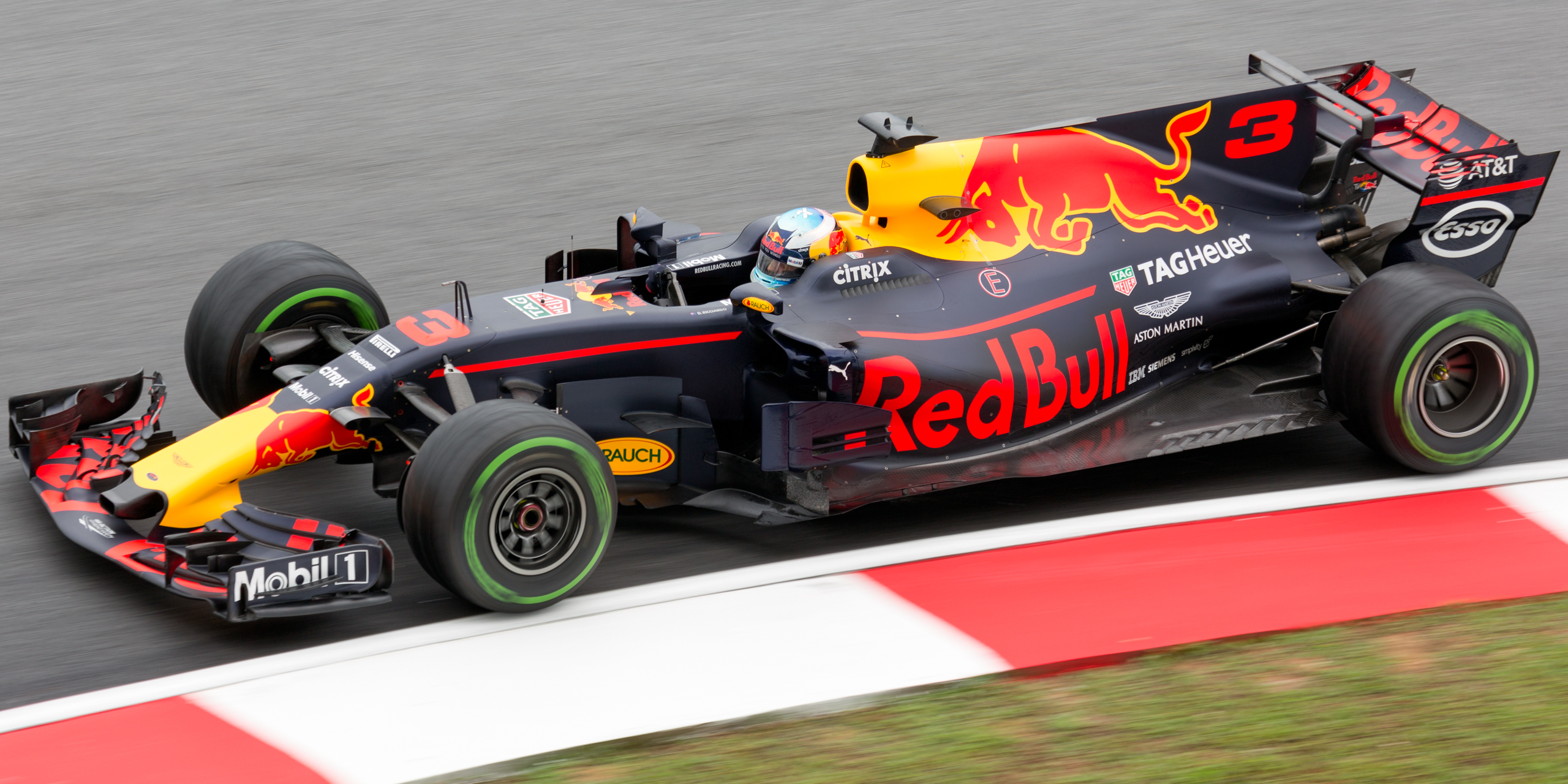
Ricciardo at the 2017 Malaysian Grand Prix

Ricciardo qualified tenth at the Australian Grand Prix after spinning into the tyre barrier in Q3, forcing him to fit a new gearbox and incur a grid penalty. He then started the race two laps down due to a gearbox sensor issue and ultimately retired with a fuel pressure problem. Another mechanical retirement at round four, the Russian Grand Prix, left him behind teammate Verstappen in the championship. Ricciardo scored his first podium of the year at the Spanish Grand Prix—albeit finishing over a minute behind the leaders—which marked the start of five consecutive podiums. He finished third again at the Monaco Grand Prix having utilised an overcut to pass Verstappen and Valtteri Bottas, and took another third place at the Canadian Grand Prix after Verstappen retired from second place. At the Azerbaijan Grand Prix, a crash in qualifying and brake issues at the start of the race left Ricciardo in 19th place on lap five. Multiple passes including a three-car overtake moved him up to third place, which became first place when Sebastian Vettel received a penalty and Lewis Hamilton was forced to pit to fix his loose headrest. This secured his fifth Formula One race victory and promoted him to fourth place in the championship, where he would remain for most of the season.

A turbocharger failure in qualifying at the British Grand Prix relegated him to 19th on the grid, but he produced a recovery drive to finish fifth. This was followed at the Hungarian Grand Prix by a collision between Ricciardo and Verstappen, which Ricciardo described as "amateur" and for which Verstappen apologised. He returned to the podium at the Belgian Grand Prix, with further top-three finishes at the Singapore, Malaysian and Japanese Grand Prix, as well as a recovery to fourth place at the Italian Grand Prix having started 16th with an engine penalty. The final four rounds of the season were impacted by mechanical issues for Ricciardo; he retired with an engine failure at the United States Grand Prix, experienced a turbocharger failure at the Mexican Grand Prix, was forced to take another engine penalty at the Brazilian Grand Prix and retired from fourth place with a hydraulics failure at the Abu Dhabi Grand Prix. This allowed Kimi Räikkönen to take fourth place in the championship from Ricciardo at the final race.

Ricciardo ended 2017 fifth in the World Drivers' Championship with 200 points to Verstappen's 168, having recorded one win and eight other podiums. Despite his points advantage, Ricciardo qualified behind Verstappen at thirteen of the twenty races. He was ranked the fourth-best driver of the year in an Autosport poll of the Formula One team principals. Broadcaster James Allen rated him similarly; he praised Ricciardo's performances as "hard to fault" but described Verstappen as a "massive roadblock" to Ricciardo's future championship hopes.

==== 2018 ====
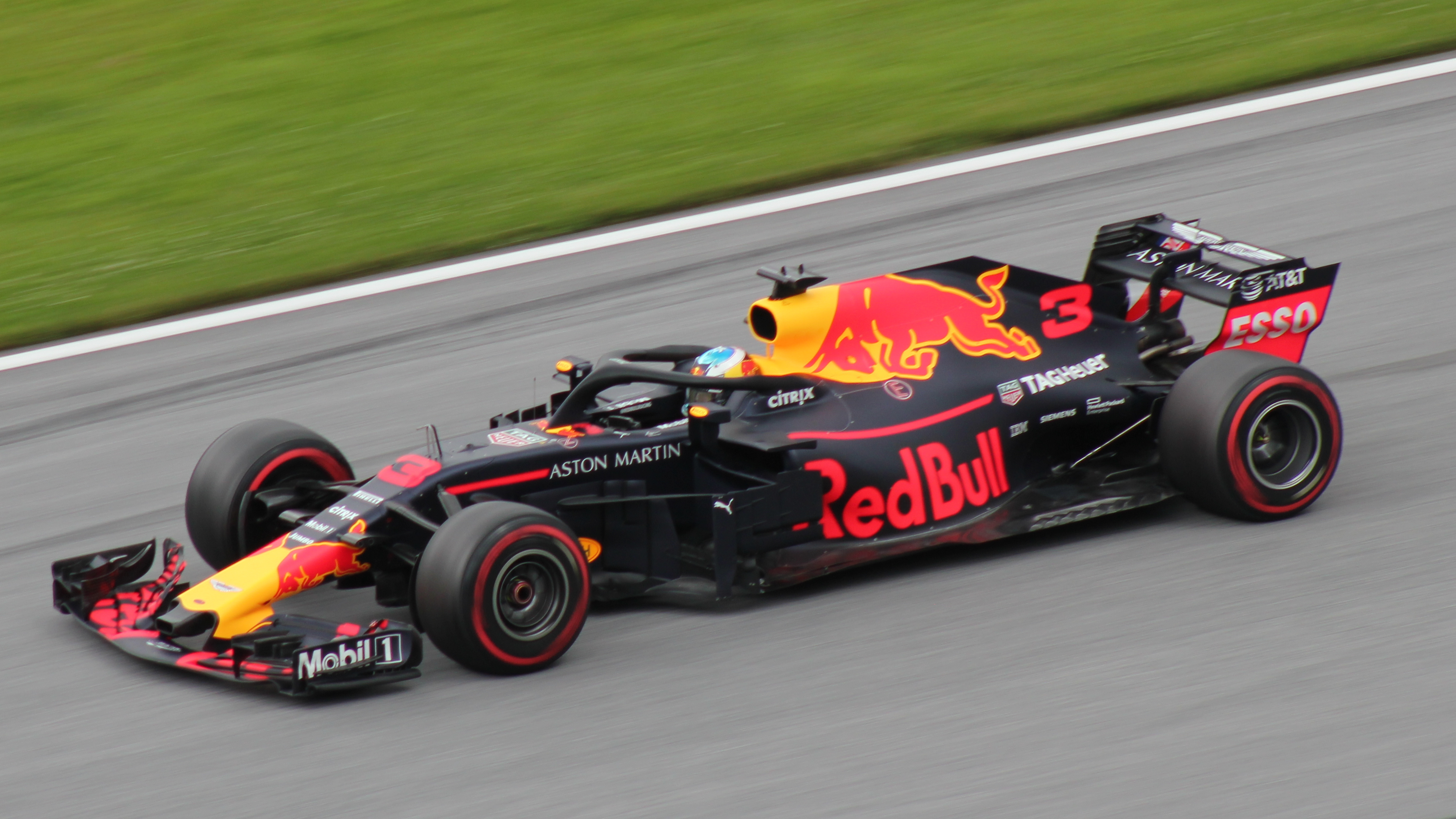
Ricciardo at the 2018 Austrian Grand Prix

Ricciardo started the 2018 season with a fourth-place at the Australian Grand Prix from eighth on the grid after a three-place penalty for speeding under red flag conditions. At the Bahrain Grand Prix, he recorded a non-finish after an electrical failure on the second lap, the first of a series of mechanical issues that affected Ricciardo in 2018. He took a commanding victory at the Chinese Grand Prix by almost nine seconds after starting sixth on the grid. Running sixth for majority of the race, he and Verstappen both pitted for fresher tyres under the safety car on lap 30. Ricciardo then overtook five cars in a span of eight laps to win the race. Ricciardo and Verstappen collided whilst contesting fourth place at the Azerbaijan Grand Prix, causing both cars to retire. Following the race, Christian Horner stated that both drivers were ordered to apologise at the Red Bull factory. Red Bull looked to be the favourites going into the Monaco Grand Prix, with Ricciardo breaking the lap record in practice. He claimed his second career pole position and held off Sebastian Vettel's Ferrari to win the race, despite losing the use of two gears and his MGU-K, reducing engine power by 25%. He described the result as "redemption" for having lost the victory in Monaco two years earlier. His win lifted him to third in the standings, but this would ultimately turn out to be his last podium of the season.

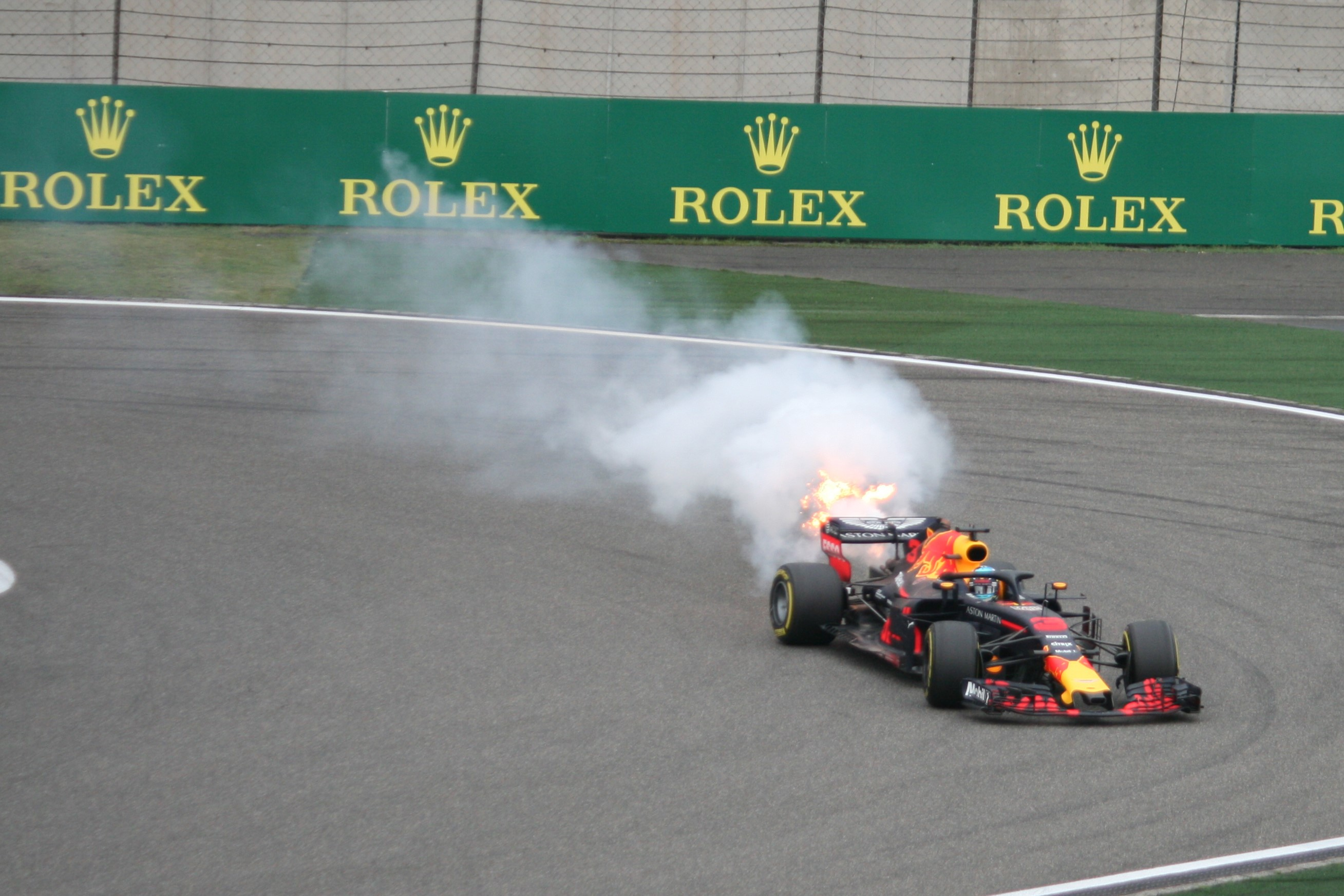
Ricciardo suffered six reliability-related retirements in 2018.

Front wing damage and a late overtake by Kimi Räikkönen denied Ricciardo a podium finish at the French Grand Prix. Further mechanical issues began at the Austrian Grand Prix where he retired from fourth place with a suspected exhaust failure. This was followed by a DRS failure in qualifying at the British Grand Prix, and then and engine penalty and later an engine failure at the German Grand Prix. He recovered from 12th on the grid to finish fourth at the Hungarian Grand Prix, but then suffered consecutive retirements at the Belgian and Italian Grands Prix, being caught up in a first-lap incident in the former and sustaining a clutch failure in the latter. His engine failed again in qualifying at the Japanese Grand Prix, but he was able to recover to fourth place in the race. A battery failure then caused his elimination from the United States Grand Prix, followed by a hydraulics failure at the Mexican Grand Prix, for which he had qualified on pole position. After the race, Ricciardo insisted that his car was "cursed" and said that he "didn't see the point" in doing the final two races of the season, both of which he ultimately finished in fourth place.

Ricciardo ended the season sixth in the championship with 170 points to Verstappen's 249, and suffered eight retirements in twenty-one races. In August, he announced his shock departure from Red Bull after five years and revealed he would join Renault for 2019. He stated that he was leaving Red Bull on good terms and said "I leave proud and I feel like I've given the team my all and had that in return". ESPN and the Formula One team principals ranked him in their top five drivers of the year, and Keith Collantine of RaceFans commented that Verstappen had the "clear edge in outright speed", but that Ricciardo's "dependable points-scoring made him an asset the team will be worse off without".

=== Renault (2019–2020) ===
==== 2019 ====
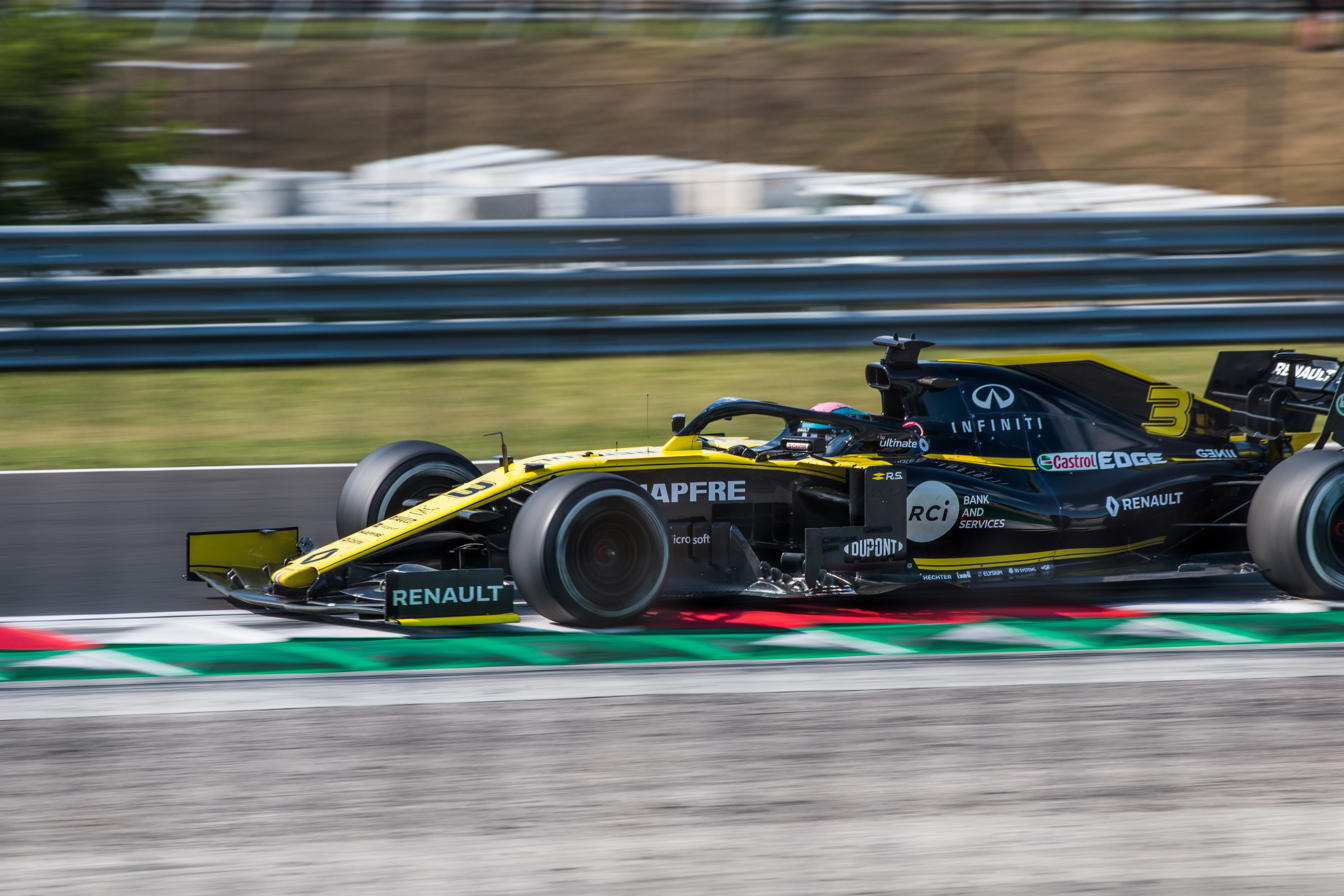
Ricciardo at the 2019 Hungarian Grand Prix

Ricciardo partnered Nico Hülkenberg at Renault for the 2019 championship. He justified the move by saying he was looking for "a fresh start somewhere else" and that he was encouraged by the team's recent progress; Renault's World Constructors' Championship results were ninth, sixth and fourth over the previous three years. Christian Horner stated that Red Bull "bent over backwards" to keep Ricciardo, but gave his opinion that Ricciardo left to avoid playing a "support role" for Verstappen in the future.

Ricciardo began the season with retirements in the first two races. He collected damage from a broken front wing at the Australian Grand Prix, then both Renault cars stopped almost simultaneously with power failures in the closing laps of the Bahrain Grand Prix whilst running in points-paying positions. A first Q3 appearance followed at the Chinese Grand Prix, before driving to his first points finish with Renault in seventh place. At the Azerbaijan Grand Prix, Ricciardo reversed into Daniil Kvyat when both cars stopped after an overtake attempt by Ricciardo, causing race-ending damage for both drivers and Ricciardo's third retirement in four races. More points finishes came with ninth place at the Monaco Grand Prix and sixth place at the Canadian Grand Prix having qualified ahead of both Red Bulls in fourth. He crossed the line in seventh place at the French Grand Prix having been embroiled in a four-car battle, but was given two separate five-second penalties on the final lap for driving infringements, dropping him out of the points.

Improved results came in the second half of the season. Renault achieved their best result since returning to the sport in 2016 at the Italian Grand Prix, with Ricciardo and Hülkenberg finishing fourth and fifth respectively. He scored three consecutive points finishes at the Mexican, United States and Brazilian Grands Prix; he finished sixth in Brazil despite receiving front wing damage and a penalty after colliding with Kevin Magnussen. However, retirements and car issues continued to affect his R.S.19. He suffered an exhaust failure at the German Grand Prix, took an engine penalty at the Belgian Grand Prix and then collided with Lance Stroll on the first lap, and was stripped of his eighth-place qualifying position at the Singapore Grand Prix for a technical infringement. He then retired after a first-lap collision at the Russian Grand Prix, and was disqualified from a sixth-place finish at the Japanese Grand Prix; he had recovered from 16th on the grid, but both Renault cars were excluded from the results ten days later having been found to have used illegal driver aids.

Ricciardo ended the season ninth in the World Drivers' Championship with 54 points, ahead of Hülkenberg's total of 37. Renault finished fifth in the World Constructors' Championship, one place lower than in 2018 having been overtaken in the standings by McLaren. Ricciardo commented that the team had "underachieved" in 2019 but that he was optimistic for 2020. On his performance, ESPN's Nate Saunders remarked that Ricciardo was "probably the only consistent bright spot" of Renault's season, and whilst his decision to leave Red Bull was a competitive step down, his first year at Renault "did little to tarnish his standing on the grid".

==== 2020 ====
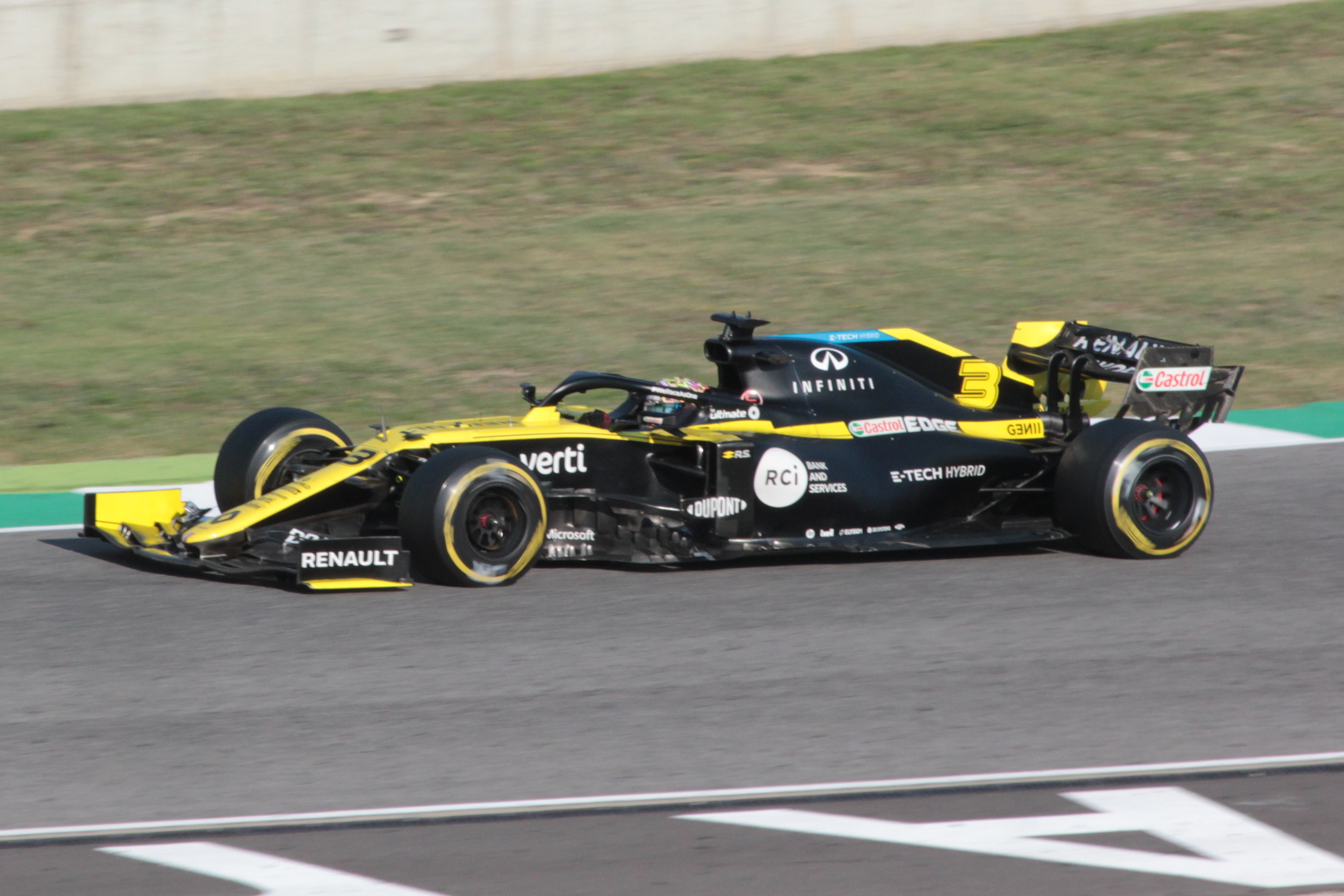
Ricciardo at the 2020 Tuscan Grand Prix

Before the start of the 2020 season—which was delayed until July due to the COVID-19 pandemic—it was announced that Ricciardo would leave Renault to join McLaren for the 2021 championship in a series of driver moves triggered by Sebastian Vettel's departure from Ferrari. On the early signing, Ricciardo commented that it may have been "too late" to make a decision on his future had he waited to assess the competitiveness of Renault's new R.S.20.

Ricciardo had a new teammate for 2020, with Hülkenberg being replaced by former Mercedes reserve driver Esteban Ocon. Ricciardo began the season with a retirement at the Austrian Grand Prix after his car overheated. He then scored points at the following three races, including a fourth-place finish at the British Grand Prix where he benefited from late-race tyre punctures for Carlos Sainz Jr. and Valtteri Bottas. He then qualified fifth for the following weekend's 70th Anniversary Grand Prix, but a spin during the race dropped him outside of the points.

Ricciardo scored points at all eleven remaining races of the season. Following the Belgian Grand Prix, where he qualified and finished fourth and set the fastest lap of the race, Ricciardo praised a set-up discovery that had "[brought] the car alive" and joked that Renault managing director Cyril Abiteboul should be "pretty nervous" about an agreement to get matching tattoos should Ricciardo achieve a podium finish in 2020. He ran in the podium positions for much of the Tuscan Grand Prix, but finished fourth again having been overtaken by Alex Albon in the closing laps. He qualified sixth at the Eifel Grand Prix and made his way to fourth place in the early laps. After Bottas ahead retired, Ricciardo finished third, earning his first podium with Renault, and Renault's first podium since the 2011 Malaysian Grand Prix. A spin in qualifying at the Portuguese Grand Prix resulted in a tenth-place start and a ninth-place finish, which Ricciardo described as "damage limitation". After qualifying fifth for the Emilia Romagna Grand Prix, the retirement of Max Verstappen and a strategy error by Sergio Pérez's team allowed Ricciardo to finish third, collecting his second podium in three races. Contact with teammate Ocon and another spin at the Turkish Grand Prix resulted in a tenth-place finish, but Ricciardo achieved top-seven finishes at the remaining three races of the season.

Ricciardo ended his final season at Renault fifth in the World Drivers' Championship, six points behind fourth-placed Pérez. He scored 119 points to Ocon's 62 and qualified ahead of Ocon at fifteen of the seventeen races. Ricciardo described his 2020 as "a really strong year" and a turn-around after a disappointing 2019. His performances were rated highly by team principals and fellow drivers. Sky Sports pundit and former Formula One driver Karun Chandhok remarked that Ricciardo had "rediscovered his form from the early Red Bull years".

=== McLaren (2021–2022) ===
==== 2021: Final F1 victory ====
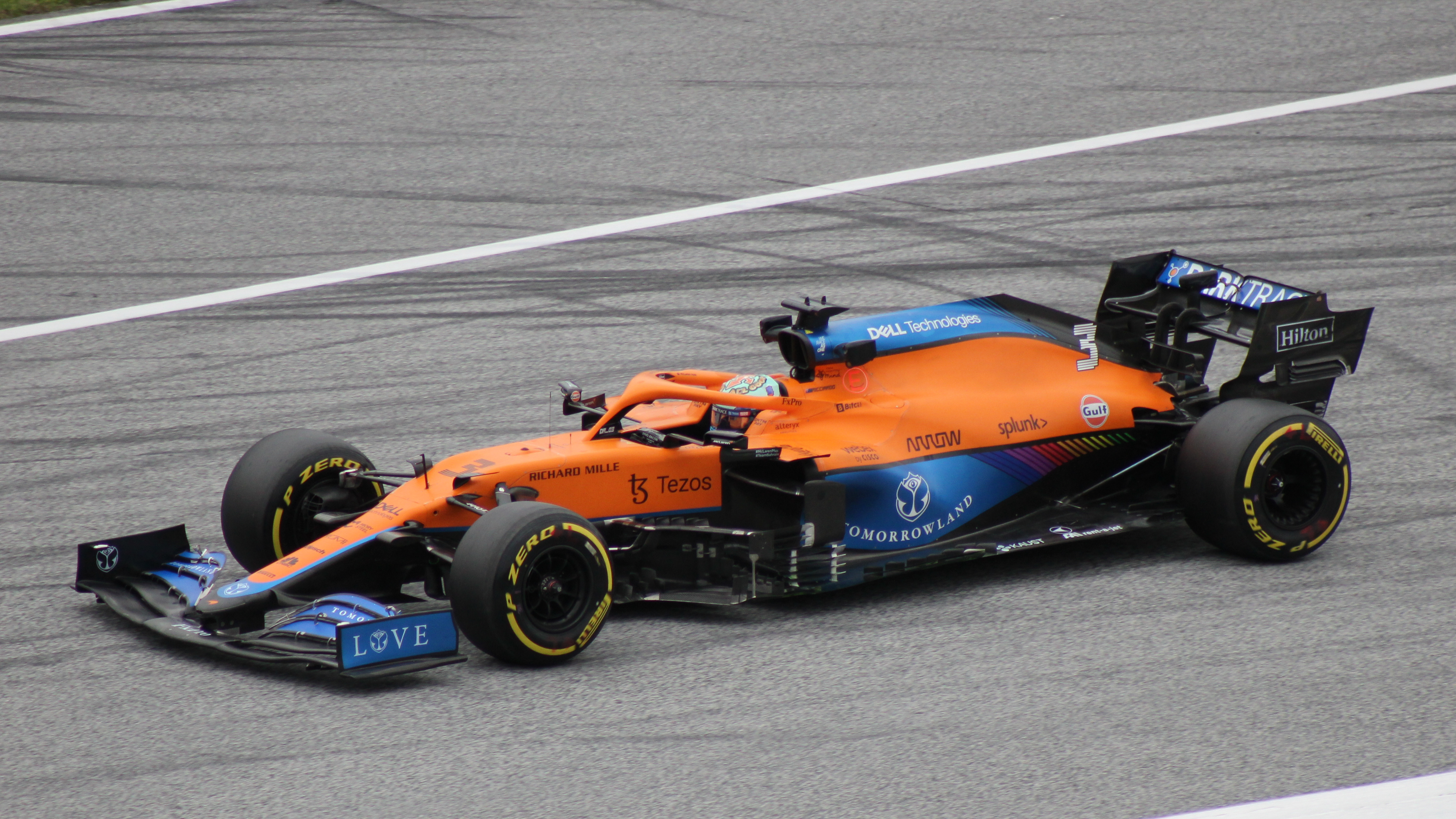
Ricciardo at the 2021 Austrian Grand Prix

Ricciardo partnered Lando Norris during his time at McLaren. He qualified sixth for his first race with the team at the Bahrain Grand Prix, and finished in the points despite receiving damage from a collision with Pierre Gasly. He scored points at the next three races, including a recovery from 16th on the grid to finish ninth at the Portuguese Grand Prix. Following his Q1 elimination in Portugal, McLaren team principal Andreas Seidl gave his opinion that Ricciardo had struggled to adapt to the MCL35M, which "[didn't] allow him to continuously push the car at the limit". He finished ahead of Norris for the first time at the following race, the Spanish Grand Prix, but was then lapped by podium-finisher Norris at the Monaco Grand Prix and failed to score points. Top-ten finishes came at the Azerbaijan and French Grands Prix, despite a qualifying crash at the former, but a power loss demoted him outside the points at the Styrian Grand Prix.

Ricciardo achieved his best McLaren result thus far at the British Grand Prix, where he finished sixth in the sprint and fifth in the race, albeit behind fourth-placed Norris. He commented that his form at McLaren was the "sad reality" and had left him "past the point of being frustrated". He was caught up in the first-corner collisions at the Hungarian Grand Prix and finished outside the points with damage. He then qualified a season-best fourth at the Belgian Grand Prix, but the race was only run for two laps behind the safety car due to weather conditions and reduced points were awarded. He qualified ahead of Norris at the Dutch Grand Prix, but was denied a points finish when the team ordered him to concede position to Norris, who was on fresher tyres. At this stage of the season, Ricciardo had scored less than half of Norris's points total.

Ricciardo qualified fifth at the Italian Grand Prix, 0.006 seconds behind Norris, a result he described as enraging. He gained two places during the sprint and then benefited from a grid penalty for Valtteri Bottas to start the main race on the front row alongside Max Verstappen. He overtook Verstappen at the first turn and withstood pressure from the Red Bull until Verstappen was eliminated in a collision with Lewis Hamilton. He then held off Norris to take his eighth Grand Prix victory, his first in over three years and McLaren's first since the 2012 Brazilian Grand Prix. He followed this with fourth place at the rain-affected Russian Grand Prix, three seconds behind a podium position. He scored points twice more in the remaining seven races with fifth-place finishes at the United States and Saudi Arabian Grands Prix, ahead of Norris in both. However, he was eliminated in Q1 at the Turkish Grand Prix, collided with Bottas and required a front wing change at the Mexico City Grand Prix and retired with a power unit issue at the São Paulo Grand Prix.

Ricciardo ended the 2021 season eighth in the championship with 115 points compared to Norris's 160. He admitted that he needed to "make another [step] next year" and summarised his season as "Started not great, got better, but still with some dips." Whilst praising his Italian Grand Prix victory, Edd Straw of The Race characterised most of his good results as being "a consequence of canny race execution and a little good fortune", and that he was "a step behind his team-mate".

==== 2022 ====
Ricciardo at the 2022 French Grand Prix

Ricciardo missed the final day of the 2022 pre-season test at the Bahrain International Circuit due to a positive COVID-19 test, but was released from isolation in time for the season-opening Bahrain Grand Prix. Both McLarens qualified and finished the race outside the top ten, with Norris admitting the team were "a long way off". He was running in ninth place at the Saudi Arabian Grand Prix before an engine failure eliminated him from the race, but followed this with his first points of the season with a sixth-place finish at the Australian Grand Prix. He scored points again in the sprint at the Emilia Romagna Grand Prix, but a collision with Carlos Sainz Jr. dropped him to the back whilst Norris went on to finish on the podium. He then failed to score points in the next three races. McLaren CEO Zak Brown admitted that Ricciardo's performances had "not met his or our expectations" and suggested that there were "mechanisms" in which Ricciardo's initial three-year contract could be cut short. He next scored points at the Azerbaijan Grand Prix where he started 13th and finished eighth. A DRS failure forced an extra pit stop and a 13th-place finish at the British Grand Prix, but Ricciardo then recorded two consecutive points finishes with ninth place at both the Austrian and French Grands Prix.

In July, amongst speculation over his future at McLaren, Ricciardo stated that he was committed to McLaren until the end of 2023 and that he was "not walking away from the sport". However, in August it was announced that Ricciardo's contract had been terminated and that he would leave McLaren at the end of 2022. He would be replaced by former Alpine reserve driver and Formula 2 champion Oscar Piastri, who, it later emerged, had signed a contract with McLaren in early July. Ricciardo finished no higher than 15th at the following four races, however he was in eighth place at the Italian Grand Prix before retiring with an oil leak, having initially ran in the top three on the opening lap. This was followed by his best result of the season at the Singapore Grand Prix, where he finished fifth despite starting 16th. He recorded a seventh-place finish at the Mexico City Grand Prix despite receiving a ten-second penalty for colliding with Yuki Tsunoda, but this was followed by a race-ending collision with Kevin Magnussen at the São Paulo Grand Prix. He received a three-place grid penalty for the season-ending Abu Dhabi Grand Prix as a result of the collision, but recovered to finish the race ninth.

The 2022 championship ended with Ricciardo 11th in the standings, scoring 37 points to Norris's 122, with McLaren losing fourth place in the World Constructors' Championship to Alpine by 14 points. He was out-qualified by Norris at twenty of the season's twenty-two races. Writing for Sky Sports, Matt Morlidge described Ricciardo's season as "tough to watch", and on his contract termination, suggested that McLaren "had little option but to look elsewhere". During the Japanese Grand Prix weekend, Ricciardo admitted that he would not be on the grid for 2023, but stated that he planned to remain involved in Formula One with a view to returning to a race seat in 2024.

=== Red Bull reserve driver and AlphaTauri / RB (2023–2024) ===
==== 2023 ====
Ricciardo elected to re-join Red Bull as their "third driver" for 2023. He specified that his role would involve "simulator work, testing sessions and commercial activities". Team principal Christian Horner commented that "to have a driver of Daniel's profile and history with the team within the group is only an asset for us". However, he ruled out a return to a race seat for Ricciardo, and advisor Helmut Marko clarified that Red Bull Junior Team driver Liam Lawson would fulfil reserve driver duties for Red Bull and AlphaTauri. On 11 July, Ricciardo took part in a Pirelli tyre testing session at Silverstone Circuit, driving the Red Bull RB19. Hours later, it was announced that he would return to a race seat with AlphaTauri, replacing Nyck de Vries with immediate effect. This marked his return to the team previously known as Toro Rosso, for whom he last raced in 2013. Multiple writers characterised the move as an audition for Sergio Pérez's Red Bull seat, with Christian Horner mentioning this as a possibility upon the expiration of Pérez's contract at the end of 2024.

At the Hungarian Grand Prix, his first race with the team, Ricciardo qualified 13th and recovered to 13th in the race having been involved in a first-lap collision. He had a lap time deleted in qualifying at the Belgian Grand Prix and qualified and finished in the bottom five. During the second free practice session of the Dutch Grand Prix, Ricciardo hit the wall in an attempt to avoid Oscar Piastri's crashed McLaren. The incident broke a metacarpal bone in Ricciardo's hand in seven places. The injury prevented him from competing for the remainder of the weekend and forced him to miss the following four races. He was replaced by reserve driver Lawson. He returned to racing at the United States Grand Prix, but brake issues led to a 15th-place finish. Ricciardo then qualified a season-best fourth for the Mexico City Grand Prix and finished the race seventh, earning his first points with AlphaTauri and the team's best result of the year. He came close to scoring a point in the São Paulo Grand Prix sprint, finishing ninth, but suffered a broken rear wing after it was hit by a loose tyre during the main race. He ended the season 17th in the championship, scoring six of the team's 25 points over his seven appearances.

==== 2024 ====
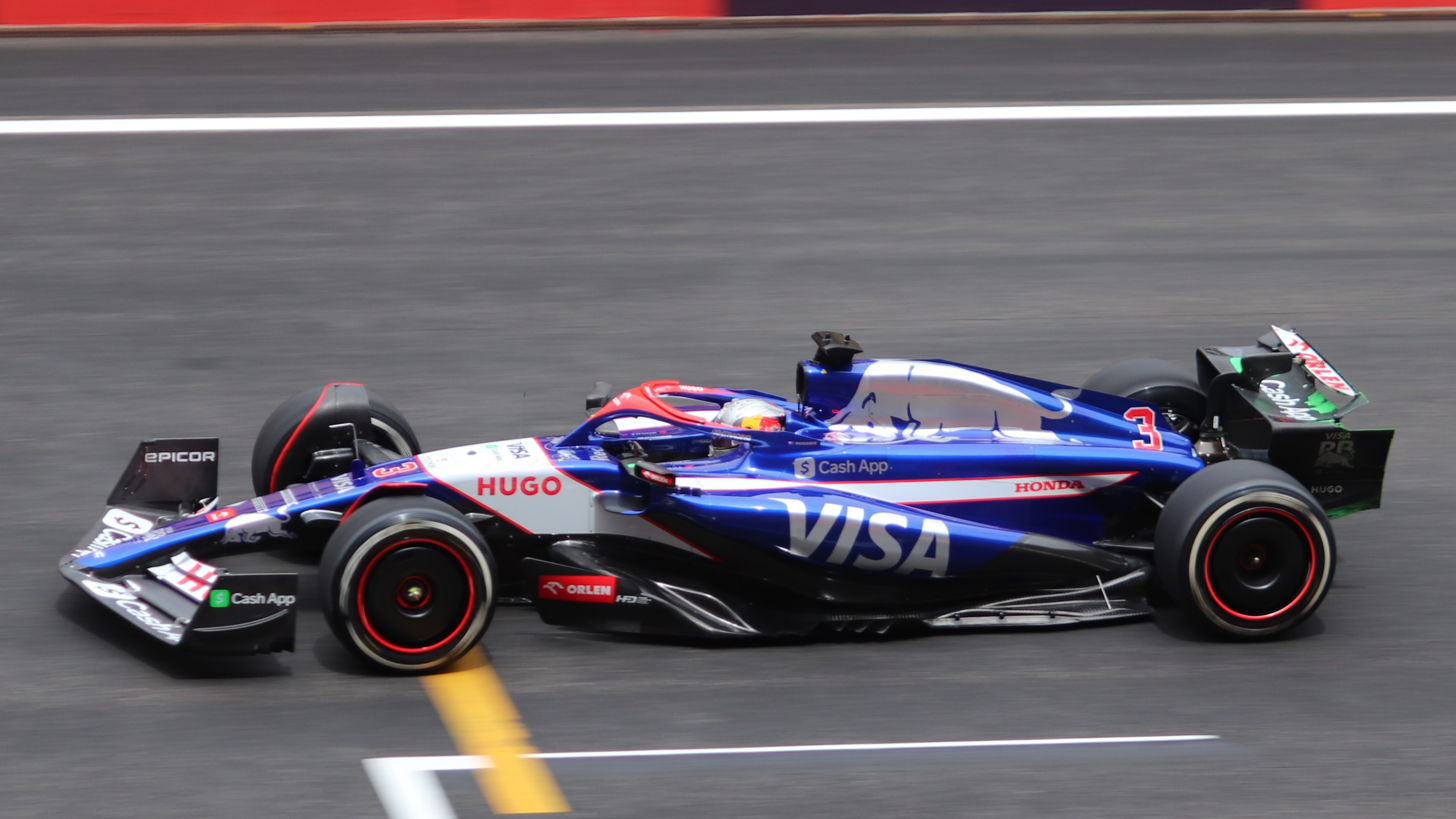
Ricciardo at the 2024 Chinese Grand Prix

Ricciardo was retained by the team, which had rebranded to RB, for 2024 alongside Yuki Tsunoda. Horner remarked that having Ricciardo, Tsunoda and Lawson at the team was "a nice headache to have" and that Lawson would have a race seat in the future. Ricciardo commented that a Red Bull seat for 2025 remained his goal. The beginning of Ricciardo's 2024 season was impacted by incidents; he spun on the final lap of the Saudi Arabian Grand Prix, had his lap time deleted in qualifying at the Australian Grand Prix, collided with Alex Albon at the Japanese Grand Prix and was rear-ended by Lance Stroll at the Chinese Grand Prix. At the Miami Grand Prix, he qualified and finished fourth in the sprint having held off the Ferrari of Carlos Sainz Jr. He commented that the result would "keep a few people quiet". His next points finish came at the Canadian Grand Prix, where he qualified fifth and finished eighth. Prior to qualifying, he received criticism from 1997 champion Jacques Villeneuve who questioned why he was still in Formula One. After qualifying, Ricciardo responded by saying Villeneuve was "talking shit".

Ricciardo scored further points at the Austrian Grand Prix, where he finished ninth, and at the Belgian Grand Prix, where he was classified tenth after race-winner George Russell's disqualification. During the summer break, discussions on the Red Bull and RB driver line-ups were held at Red Bull's Milton Keynes headquarters. Sergio Pérez's position at Red Bull seemed uncertain; Horner had described his results as "unsustainable" and Ricciardo was a candidate to replace him. RB CEO Peter Bayer also stated that the team would have "quiet discussions" on a promotion for Lawson; Helmut Marko had earlier commented that RB "is a junior team" and that Lawson should be given a seat soon. Ultimately, no changes were made. However, four races later at the Singapore Grand Prix, speculation arose as to whether Ricciardo would be dropped from the team following the race. He finished the race 18th and pitted for fresh tyres to set the fastest lap of the race on the penultimate lap. He appeared emotional after the race, admitting that it could have been his last. Four days later, his departure from the team was confirmed, with Lawson replacing him from the United States Grand Prix onward.

Ricciardo ended the season 17th in the championship with twelve points, compared to Tsunoda's 22 points up to and including the Singapore Grand Prix. Motor Sport's James Elson stated that Ricciardo had been "summarily outperformed" by Tsunoda during 2024, and Jake Boxall-Legge of Autosport branded his move back to the Red Bull stable a "waste of time". On his departure from the sport, Ricciardo commented that he was proud of his career, and that "truth be told I wouldn't change it".

== Driver profile ==
=== Driving style ===
Ricciardo is known for his aggressive style as well as favouring a late braking manoeuvre to engineer overtakes. Ricciardo also prefers to carry more speed through the corner by making it more of a 'U' shape, utilising a little rear instability on entry to turn in, and enough grip to rotate the car mid-corner without the rear breaking away.

=== Public image ===
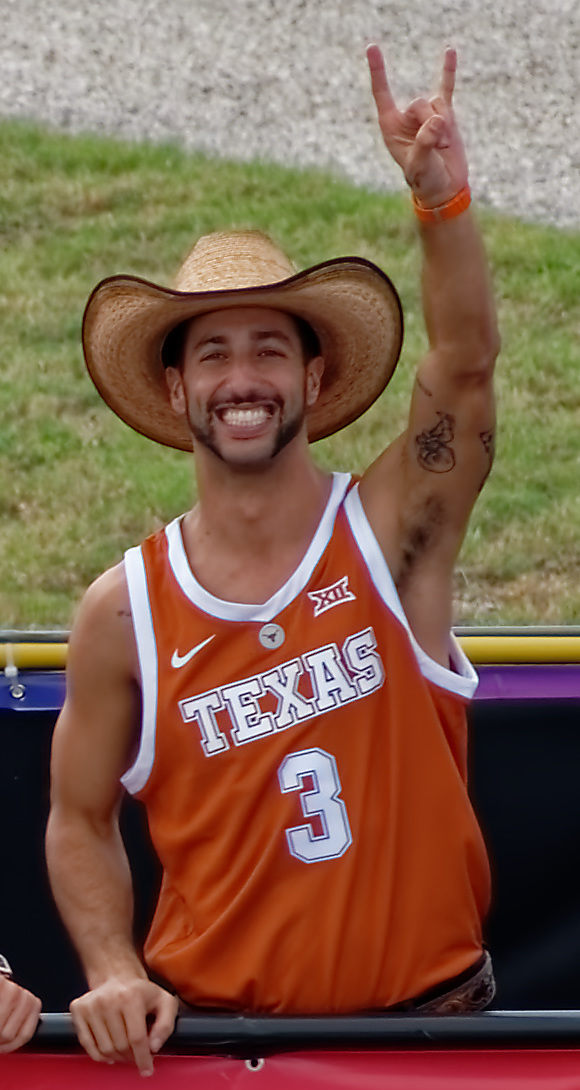
Ricciardo at the 2021 United States Grand Prix

Ricciardo was regarded as one of the most prominent names in Formula One, known for his laid back nature and smile, with The New York Times describing him in 2016 saying, "If a survey could be made of the 22 Formula One drivers to establish who smiles the most, has the sunniest disposition and seems to be generally the nicest guy, Ricciardo would surely be the leader." His personal profile grew with the success of the reality show Drive to Survive, where he has been called "the face of the show". After the 2021 season, Ricciardo was appointed a Member of the Order of Australia in the 2022 Australia Day Honours for "significant service to motor sport as a competitor and ambassador, and to the community".

Ricciardo is often referred to as "the honey badger" referencing his racing style, explaining how "[i]t's supposed to be the most fearless animal in the animal kingdom. When you look at it, he seems quite cute and cuddly, but as soon as someone crosses his territory in a way he doesn't like, he turns into a bit of a savage and he'll go after anything – tigers, pythons – he turns very quickly, but he's a good guy."

On 8 February 2015, during the third episode of series 22 of the popular British motoring television programme Top Gear, Ricciardo became the fastest Formula One driver to perform a lap of the Top Gear test track during the Star in a Reasonably Priced Car feature, beating the previous record-holder Lewis Hamilton with a time of 1:42.2.

== Personal life ==
Ricciardo pronounces his surname "Ricardo" (/rɪˈkɑːrdoʊ/) instead of the Italian pronunciation ([ritˈtʃardo], with a "ch"-sound), attributing this to the way it was usually pronounced growing up in Australia and by his family. Growing up as a fan of NASCAR Cup Series driver Dale Earnhardt, Ricciardo adopted the number 3 as his permanent racing number in Formula One in his honour. Ricciardo supports Australian rules football club West Coast Eagles and was the club's number-one ticket holder in 2015 and 2016. He is also a UFC fan and, during the course of his Formula One career, developed an affinity for American football team Buffalo Bills. He further supports Twenty20 cricket club Melbourne Stars, as childhood friend and Australian cricketer Marcus Stoinis represents the team.

Ricciardo is in a relationship with Heidi Berger, the daughter of 10-time Formula One Grand Prix winner Gerhard Berger. In 2019, he founded the eponymous kart racing series, the Daniel Ricciardo Series (DRS), to provide affordable access to owner–driver karting for drivers aged 7–16; it has since expanded to an arrive-and-drive format. Notable graduates include 2024 GB4 Championship runner-up and 2026 F1 Academy champion Alisha Palmowski. Ricciardo retired from motor racing in September 2025, aged 36, to become a global ambassador for Ford Racing.

== Awards and honours ==
=== Formula One ===
- Lorenzo Bandini Trophy: 2014

=== Other awards ===
- Laureus World Sports Award for Breakthrough Performance of the Year: 2015
- GQ Australia Sportsman of the Year: 2014
- Confartigianato Motori Driver of the Year: 2014, 2018
- BRDC Bruce McLaren Trophy: 2013, 2014, 2016
- BRDC Innes Ireland Trophy: 2014, 2015

=== Orders and special awards ===
- Kentucky
  - Honorable Order of Kentucky Colonels (2021)
- Australia
  - Member of the Order of Australia (2022)

==== Special awards ====
- Confartigianato Motori Legend of F1 Award: 2024

== Karting record ==
=== Karting career summary ===
Season	Series	Position
2000	Bob Smithers Memorial — Junior Clubman	5th
2005	Australian CIK Championship Series — Intercontinental A	1st
2005	Australian National Sprint Kart Championship — Junior Clubman	10th
2010	Van der Drift Fundraiser	DNF

== Racing record ==
=== Racing career summary ===
Season	Series	Team	Races	Wins	Poles	F/Laps	Podiums	Points	Position
2005	Western Australian Formula Ford Championship	Privateer	3	0	0	?	0	74	8th
2005	Australian Formula Ford Championship	Fastlane Racing	3	0	0	0	0	0	NC
2006	Formula BMW Asia	Eurasia Motorsport	19	2	3	3	12	231	**3rd**
2006	Formula BMW UK	Motaworld Racing	2	0	0	0	0	3	20th
2006	Formula BMW World Final	Fortec Motorsport	1	0	0	0	0	N/A	5th
2007	Formula Renault 2.0 Italy	RP Motorsport	14	0	0	0	0	196	6th
2007	Eurocup Formula Renault 2.0	RP Motorsport	4	0	0	0	0	0	NC
2008	Formula Renault 2.0 WEC	SG Formula	15	8	9	7	11	192	**1st**
2008	Eurocup Formula Renault 2.0	SG Formula	18	6	5	5	7	136	**2nd**
2008	Formula 3 Euro Series	SG Formula	2	0	0	0	0	N/A	NC
2008	Masters of Formula 3	SG Formula	1	0	0	0	0	N/A	NC
2009	British Formula 3 Championship	Carlin Motorsport	20	7	6	5	13	275	**1st**
2009	Masters of Formula 3	Carlin Motorsport	1	0	0	0	0	N/A	NC
2009	Formula Renault 3.5 Series	Tech 1 Racing	2	0	0	0	0	0	34th
2009	Macau Grand Prix	Carlin	1	0	0	0	0	N/A	NC
2010	Formula Renault 3.5 Series	Tech 1 Racing	17	4	8	5	8	136	**2nd**
2011	Formula Renault 3.5 Series	ISR	12	1	2	3	6	144	5th
2011	Formula One	HRT Formula 1 Team	11	0	0	0	0	0	27th
2012	Formula One	Scuderia Toro Rosso	20	0	0	0	0	10	18th
2013	Formula One	Scuderia Toro Rosso	19	0	0	0	0	20	14th
2014	Formula One	Infiniti Red Bull Racing	19	3	0	1	8	238	**3rd**
2015	Formula One	Infiniti Red Bull Racing	19	0	0	3	2	92	8th
2016	Formula One	Red Bull Racing	21	1	1	4	8	256	**3rd**
2017	Formula One	Red Bull Racing	20	1	0	1	9	200	5th
2018	Formula One	Aston Martin Red Bull Racing	21	2	2	4	2	170	6th
2019	Formula One	Renault F1 Team	21	0	0	0	0	54	9th
2020	Formula One	Renault DP World F1 Team	17	0	0	2	2	119	5th
2021	Formula One	McLaren F1 Team	22	1	0	1	1	115	8th
2022	Formula One	McLaren F1 Team	22	0	0	0	0	37	11th
2023	Formula One	Scuderia AlphaTauri	8	0	0	0	0	6	17th
2024	Formula One	Visa Cash App RB F1 Team	18	0	0	1	0	12	17th

=== Complete Formula BMW Asia results ===
(key) (Races in bold indicate pole position; races in italics indicate fastest lap)

Year	Team	1	2	3	4	5	6	7	8	9	10	11	12	13	14	15	16	17	18	19	Pos	Points
2006	Eurasia Motorsport	SEP; 1; 5	SEP; 2; 5	SEP; 3; 5	SEP; 4; 4	SEP; 5; 3	BEI; 1; 3	BEI; 2; 3	BEI; 3; 2	SEN; 1; 3	SEN; 2; 4	SEN; 3; 3	BIR; 1; 1	BIR; 2; 1	BIR; 3 Ret	SHI; 1; 4	SHI; 2; 3	**ZIC**; **1**; 2	ZIC; 2; 2	ZIC; 3; 2	3rd	231

=== Complete Formula Renault 2.0 Italia results ===
(key) (Races in bold indicate pole position; races in italics indicate fastest lap)

Year	Team	1	2	3	4	5	6	7	8	9	10	11	12	13	14	Pos	Points
2007	RP Motorsport	VAL1; 1; 6	VAL1; 2; 30	VAL2; 1; 4	VAL2; 2; 8	SPA; 1; 5	SPA; 2 Ret	VAL; 1; 4	VAL; 2; 4	MIS; 1; 12	MIS; 2; 12	MUG; 1; 4	MUG; 2; 4	MNZ; 1; 11	MNZ; 2; 9	6th	196

=== Complete Eurocup Formula Renault 2.0 results ===
(key) (Races in bold indicate pole position; races in italics indicate fastest lap)

Year	Team	1	2	3	4	5	6	7	8	9	10	11	12	13	14	Pos	Points	Ref
2007	RP Motorsport	ZOL; 1	ZOL; 2	NÜR; 1	NÜR; 2	HUN; 1	HUN; 2	DON; 1	DON; 2	MAG; 1	MAG; 2	EST; 1; 17	EST; 2; 15	CAT; 1; 33	CAT; 2 Ret	NC	0	
2008	SG Formula	SPA; 1; 1	SPA; 2; 4	SIL; 1; 4	SIL; 2; 1	**HUN**; **1**; 1	**HUN**; **2**; 1	NÜR; 1; 3	NÜR; 2; 5	LMS; 1 Ret	LMS; 2; 6	**EST**; **1**; 1	EST; 2; 10	**CAT**; **1**; 6	**CAT**; **2**; 1	2nd	136	

=== Complete Formula Renault 2.0 WEC results ===
(key) (Races in bold indicate pole position; races in italics indicate fastest lap)

Year	Team	1	2	3	4	5	6	7	8	9	10	11	12	13	14	15	Pos	Points
2008	SG Formula	**NOG**; **1**; 1	**NOG**; **2**; 5	DIJ; 1; 1	**DIJ**; **2**; 1	**VAL**; **1**; 1	**VAL**; **2** DSQ	**LEM**; 1	EST; 1; 1	**EST**; **2**; 2	SPA; 1; 2	**SPA**; **2**; 1	MAG; 1; 6	MAG; 2; 4	**CAT**; **1**; 1	**CAT**; **2**; 2	1st	192

=== Complete British Formula Three Championship results ===
(key) (Races in bold indicate pole position; races in italics indicate fastest lap)

Year	Team	1	2	3	4	5	6	7	8	9	10	11	12	13	14	15	16	17	18	19	20	Pos	Points	Ref
2009	Carlin Motorsport	OUL; 1; 1	OUL; 2; 1	SIL; 1; 5	SIL; 2; 1	**ROC**; **1** Ret	ROC; 2; 5	HOC; 1; 4	HOC; 2; 8	SNE; 1; 2	SNE; 2; 2	DON; 1; 3	**DON**; **2**; 5	**SPA**; **1**; 1	SPA; 2; 2	**SIL**; **1**; 1	SIL; 2; 3	ALG; 1; 3	ALG; 2; 5	**BRH**; **1**; 1	**BRH**; **2**; 4	1st	275	

=== Complete Formula Renault 3.5 Series results ===
(key) (Races in bold indicate pole position; races in italics indicate fastest lap)

Year	Team	1	2	3	4	5	6	7	8	9	10	11	12	13	14	15	16	17	Pos	Points
2009	Tech 1 Racing	CAT; SPR	CAT; FEA	SPA; SPR	SPA; FEA	MON; FEA	HUN; SPR	HUN; FEA	SIL; SPR	SIL; FEA	BUG; SPR	BUG; FEA	ALG; SPR; Ret	ALG; FEA; 15	NÜR; SPR	NÜR; FEA	ALC; SPR	ALC; FEA	34th	0
2010	Tech 1 Racing	**ALC**; **1**; 3	**ALC**; **2**; 2	SPA; 1; 13	SPA; 2; 5	**MON**; **1**; 1	BRN; 1; 12	BRN; 2; 5	MAG; 1; 6	**MAG**; **2**; 2	**HUN**; **1**; 1	HUN; 2; 6	**HOC**; **1**; 1	HOC; 2; 11	SIL; 1 Ret	**SIL**; **2**; 2	**CAT**; **1**; 1	CAT; 2; 4	**2nd**	**136**
2011	ISR Racing	ALC; 1	ALC; 2	SPA; 1; 10	SPA; 2; 9	MNZ; 1; 6	**MNZ**; **2**; 2	**MON**; **1**; 1	NÜR; 1; 2	NÜR; 2; 5	HUN; 1 DNS	HUN; 2; 12	SIL; 1; 2	SIL; 2; 2	LEC; 1; 6	LEC; 2; 2	CAT; 1	CAT; 2	5th	144

=== Complete Macau Grand Prix results ===
Year	Team	Car	Qualifying	Quali race	Main race
2009	(United Kingdom) Carlin	Dallara F308	5th	6th	DNF

=== Complete Formula One results ===
(key) (Races in bold indicate pole position; races in italics indicate fastest lap)

Year	Entrant	Chassis	Engine	1	2	3	4	5	6	7	8	9	10	11	12	13	14	15	16	17	18	19	20	21	22	23	24	WDC	Points
2011	Scuderia Toro Rosso	Toro Rosso STR6	Ferrari 056 2.4 V8	AUS; TD	MAL; TD	CHN; TD	TUR; TD	ESP; TD	MON; TD	CAN; TD	EUR; TD																	27th	0
2011	Hispania Racing F1 Team	Hispania F111	Cosworth CA2011 2.4 V8									GBR; 19																27th	0
2011	HRT Formula 1 Team	Hispania F111	Cosworth CA2011 2.4 V8										GER; 19	HUN; 18	BEL; Ret	ITA; NC	SIN; 19	JPN; 22	KOR; 19	IND; 18	ABU; Ret	BRA; 20						27th	0
2012	Scuderia Toro Rosso	Toro Rosso STR7	Ferrari 056 2.4 V8	AUS; 9	MAL; 12	CHN; 17	BHR; 15	ESP; 13	MON; Ret	CAN; 14	EUR; 11	GBR; 13	GER; 13	HUN; 15	BEL; 9	ITA; 12	SIN; 9	JPN; 10	KOR; 9	IND; 13	ABU; 10	USA; 12	BRA; 13					18th	10
2013	Scuderia Toro Rosso	Toro Rosso STR8	Ferrari 056 2.4 V8	AUS; Ret	MAL; 18^{†}	CHN; 7	BHR; 16	ESP; 10	MON; Ret	CAN; 15	GBR; 8	GER; 12	HUN; 13	BEL; 10	ITA; 7	SIN; Ret	KOR; 19^{†}	JPN; 13	IND; 10	ABU; 16	USA; 11	BRA; 10						14th	20
2014	Infiniti Red Bull Racing	Red Bull RB10	Renault Energy F1-2014 1.6 V6 t	AUS; DSQ	MAL; Ret	BHR; 4	CHN; 4	ESP; 3	MON; 3	CAN; 1	AUT; 8	GBR; 3	GER; 6	HUN; 1	BEL; 1	ITA; 5	SIN; 3	JPN; 4	RUS; 7	USA; 3	BRA; Ret	ABU; 4						3rd	238
2015	Infiniti Red Bull Racing	Red Bull RB11	Renault Energy F1-2015 1.6 V6 t	AUS; 6	MAL; 10	CHN; 9	BHR; 6	ESP; 7	MON; 5	CAN; 13	AUT; 10	GBR; Ret	HUN; 3	BEL; Ret	ITA; 8	SIN; 2	JPN; 15	RUS; 15^{†}	USA; 10	MEX; 5	BRA; 11	ABU; 6						8th	92
2016	Red Bull Racing	Red Bull RB12	TAG Heuer 1.6 V6 t	AUS; 4	BHR; 4	CHN; 4	RUS; 11	ESP; 4	**MON**; 2	CAN; 7	EUR; 7	AUT; 5	GBR; 4	HUN; 3	GER; 2	BEL; 2	ITA; 5	SIN; 2	MAL; 1	JPN; 6	USA; 3	MEX; 3	BRA; 8	ABU; 5				3rd	256
2017	Red Bull Racing	Red Bull RB13	TAG Heuer 1.6 V6 t	AUS; Ret	CHN; 4	BHR; 5	RUS; Ret	ESP; 3	MON; 3	CAN; 3	AZE; 1	AUT; 3	GBR; 5	HUN; Ret	BEL; 3	ITA; 4	SIN; 2	MAL; 3	JPN; 3	USA; Ret	MEX; Ret	BRA; 6	ABU; Ret					5th	200
2018	Aston Martin Red Bull Racing	Red Bull RB14	TAG Heuer 1.6 V6 t	AUS; 4	BHR; Ret	CHN; 1	AZE; Ret	ESP; 5	**MON**; 1	CAN; 4	FRA; 4	AUT; Ret	GBR; 5	GER; Ret	HUN; 4	BEL; Ret	ITA; Ret	SIN; 6	RUS; 6	JPN; 4	USA; Ret	**MEX**; Ret	BRA; 4	ABU; 4				6th	170
2019	Renault F1 Team	Renault R.S.19	Renault E-Tech 19 1.6 V6 t	AUS; Ret	BHR; 18^{†}	CHN; 7	AZE; Ret	ESP; 12	MON; 9	CAN; 6	FRA; 11	AUT; 12	GBR; 7	GER; Ret	HUN; 14	BEL; 14	ITA; 4	SIN; 14	RUS; Ret	JPN; DSQ	MEX; 8	USA; 6	BRA; 6	ABU; 11				9th	54
2020	Renault DP World F1 Team	Renault R.S.20	Renault E-Tech 20 1.6 V6 t	AUT; Ret	STY; 8	HUN; 8	GBR; 4	70A; 14	ESP; 11	BEL; 4	ITA; 6	TUS; 4	RUS; 5	EIF; 3	POR; 9	EMI; 3	TUR; 10	BHR; 7	SKH; 5	ABU; 7								5th	119
2021	McLaren F1 Team	McLaren MCL35M	Mercedes M12 E Performance 1.6 V6 t	BHR; 7	EMI; 6	POR; 9	ESP; 6	MON; 12	AZE; 9	FRA; 6	STY; 13	AUT; 7	GBR; 5	HUN; 11	BEL; 4‡	NED; 11	ITA; 1^{3}	RUS; 4	TUR; 13	USA; 5	MXC; 12	SAP; Ret	QAT; 12	SAU; 5	ABU; 12			8th	115
2022	McLaren F1 Team	McLaren MCL36	Mercedes F1 M13 E Performance 1.6 V6 t	BHR; 14	SAU; Ret	AUS; 6	EMI; 18^{6}	MIA; 13	ESP; 12	MON; 13	AZE; 8	CAN; 11	GBR; 13	AUT; 9	FRA; 9	HUN; 15	BEL; 15	NED; 17	ITA; Ret	SIN; 5	JPN; 11	USA; 16	MXC; 7	SAP; Ret	ABU; 9			11th	37
2023	Scuderia AlphaTauri	AlphaTauri AT04	Honda RBPTH001 1.6 V6 t	BHR	SAU	AUS	AZE	MIA	MON	ESP	CAN	AUT	GBR	HUN; 13	BEL; 16	NED; WD	ITA	SIN	JPN	QAT	USA; 15	MXC; 7	SAP; 13	LVG; 14	ABU; 11			17th	6
2024	Visa Cash App RB F1 Team	RB VCARB 01	Honda RBPTH002 1.6 V6 t	BHR; 13	SAU; 16	AUS; 12	JPN; Ret	CHN; Ret	MIA; 15^{4}	EMI; 13	MON; 12	CAN; 8	ESP; 15	AUT; 9	GBR; 13	HUN; 12	BEL; 10	NED; 12	ITA; 13	AZE; 13	SIN; 18	USA	MXC	SAP	LVG	QAT	ABU	17th	12

^{†} Did not finish, but was classified as he had completed more than 90% of the race distance.
^{‡} Half points awarded as less than 75% of race distance was completed.

== See also ==
- Formula One drivers from Australia

Sporting positions
Preceded by Jules Bianchi (French Championship)	Formula Renault 2.0 WEC champion 2008	Succeeded by Albert Costa
Preceded by Jaime Alguersuari	British Formula Three Champion; 2009	Succeeded by Jean-Éric Vergne
Awards and achievements
Preceded by Piero Ferrari	Lorenzo Bandini Trophy; 2014	Succeeded by Mercedes AMG Petronas F1 Team
Preceded by David Brabham; 2012	Sir Jack Brabham Award; 2014	Succeeded by Matt Campbell; 2017
Preceded by Marc Márquez	Laureus World Breakthrough of the Year; 2015	Succeeded by Jordan Spieth
