= Rémi Taffin =

French engineer (born 1975)

- Born: 14 March 1975 (age 50)
- Employer: Oreca
- Title: Technical director

Rémi Taffin (born 14 March 1975) is a French engineer who is the technical director of French motorsports company Oreca. He was previously served as engine technical director for Alpine F1 Team and Renault Sport.

== Career ==
After studying as a mechanical engineer at ESTACA, an engineering specialised school in Paris, Taffin's first experience of motorsport was in 1998 as a race engineer for Signature in Formula 3. In 1999, Taffin joined Renault F1 Team working across a range of customer clients, including British American Racing as engine engineer to Ricardo Zonta, Arrows International as engine engineer for Jos Verstappen.

Taffin then moved to work for Renault's works team in 2002 becoming race engine engineer to Jenson Button in 2002, before moving to working with Fernando Alonso in 2003. He helped engineer the Spaniard to two double world championships in 2005 and 2006. Taffin continued his race engineering role with Heikki Kovalainen in 2007 and Alonso again in 2008.

Taffin stepped up to manage Renault F1 track activities in 2009. Then with the creation of Renault Sport F1 in 2011, he took responsibility for the trackside engine performance of Renault Sport F1’s customers. Attending all races throughout the season, Taffin oversaw customer support for the Renault-powered teams and was integral to the four world titles secured by Red Bull Racing in the V8 era.

In 2014 he became Operations Director, managing the teams of engineers and technicians in the dynos and assembly department at Viry and ensuring a smooth transition to track by overseeing the engineers integrated to Renault’s partner teams. From 2016 to 2021, Taffin managed Renault’s power unit development as Engine Technical Director, being responsible for the entire power unit department at Viry.

In December 2021, Taffin became technical director at Oreca.
