= Patrick Faure =

French businessman (born 1946)

Patrick Faure (French pronunciation: [patʁik fɔʁ]), born May 12, 1946, is a French businessman. His best-known role was in motorsport, as President of Renault Sport and Renault F1 Team.

== Early career and education ==
Faure was born in Périgueux (Dordogne), France, but spent his youth in Paris. He had a strong relationship with his father, Maurice Faure, a former Cahors city mayor and minister of various French governments.

He studied law and politics at the Lycée Louis-le-Grand before being awarded a place in the École Nationale d’Administration. He graduated in 1972 and worked for three years as a civil administrator of the Caisse des Dépôts et Consignations. In 1975, he moved to the private sector and joined the precision engineering company Labinal. In 1977, he became Chairman of Gelbon.

== Renault ==
In 1977, he was hired by Renault as Toulouse's regional manager. After that, he took over the sales department. He increased his importance within Renault’s structure over the years, and he was manager of Renault Austria (1981) and Renault UK (1982). In 1985, he was named head of the Public Affairs and Corporate Communications Department. In January 1986 he was appointed a member of Renault’s board of directors and President of Renault Sport. The motorsport company was in a complex situation, and Faure decided to end Renault's Formula One involvement. He ordered Bernard Dudot to develop a new 3.5-litre normally aspirated engine. When the turbos were banned, Renault returned to Grand Prix racing. In 1988, he was named Secretary General for the Renault Group. In 1991, he was officially appointed chairman and CEO of Renault Sport. In 1998, he became chairman and CEO of Renault VI. In 2001, he was named Executive Vice President of Renault and President of Renault F1 Team. In late 2004, he left the Renault’s board of directors. As of January 2005, he was concentrating his efforts on the Renault racing team. He announced his retirement in March 2006 during a radio interview at the conclusion of the Bahrain Grand Prix and was replaced as president of the Renault F1 team by Alain Dassas on April 3, 2006.

== Beyond Renault ==
Since 1993 he has been a member of Vinci SA's Board of Directors. His appointment was set to end in 2013. He is also a member of the Board of Directors of Cofiroute, a motorways' concessionaire which is owned by Vinci. He held several appointments in other companies, such as chairman of the Board of Directors of Ertico, Chairman of the Association France-Amériques, Director of ESL & Network and of Waterslim Luxembourg.

On October 10, 2006, the nuclear energy company Areva, sponsor of the French team for the 2007 America’s Cup, hired Faure as a project consultant, because of his experience in organising large sport operations. He remains as a company consultant but is now retired.
