= Renault in Formula One =

Formula One activities of Renault

Renault
- Full name: Renault Formula 1 Team
- Base: Viry-Châtillon, Essonne, France (1977–1985); Enstone, Oxfordshire, England, UK (2002–2011, 2016–2020) (Note: While Enstone was the main base during these periods, chassis-engine integration and some management and marketing activities were still carried out by the Viry-Châtillon base.)
- Noted staff: Bernard Dudot; Jean Sage; Patrick Faure; Bob Bell; Éric Boullier; Alain Dassas; Alan Permane; James Allison; Flavio Briatore; Mike Gascoyne; John Iley; Steve Nielsen; Pat Symonds; Dino Toso; Dirk de Beer; Frédéric Vasseur; Rob White; Cyril Abiteboul; Nick Chester; Pat Fry
- Noted drivers: (Spain) Fernando Alonso (France) Alain Prost (France) René Arnoux (Italy) Giancarlo Fisichella (France) Jean-Pierre Jabouille (Italy) Jarno Trulli
- Previous name: Benetton Formula (1986–2001); Lotus F1 Team (2012–2015)
- Next name: Alpine F1 Team

Formula One World Championship career
- First entry: 1977 British Grand Prix
- Last entry: 2020 Abu Dhabi Grand Prix
- Races entered: 403 (400 starts)
- Engines: Renault
- Constructors' Championships: 2 (2005, 2006)
- Drivers' Championships: 2 (2005, 2006)
- Race victories: 35
- Podiums: 103
- Points: 1777
- Pole positions: 51
- Fastest laps: 33

Renault as a Formula One engine manufacturer
Formula One World Championship career
- First entry: 1977 British Grand Prix
- Last entry: 2025 Abu Dhabi Grand Prix
- Races entered: 774 (771 starts)
- Chassis: Renault, Lotus (1983–1986), Ligier, Tyrrell, Williams, Benetton, Red Bull, Lotus (2011), Lotus (2012–2014), Caterham, Toro Rosso, McLaren, Alpine
- Constructors' Championships: 12 (1992, 1993, 1994, 1995, 1996, 1997, 2005, 2006, 2010, 2011, 2012, 2013) (Note: All Constructors' Championships achieved by Mecachrome-assembled engines.)
- Drivers' Championships: 11 (1992, 1993, 1995, 1996, 1997, 2005, 2006, 2010, 2011, 2012, 2013) (Note: All Drivers' Championships achieved by Mecachrome-assembled engines.)
- Race victories: 169 (Note: Nine further wins achieved by TAG Heuer badged Renault engines.)
- Podiums: 465
- Points: 8228.5
- Pole positions: 213
- Fastest laps: 177

Renault, a French automobile manufacturer, was associated with Formula One as both team owner and engine manufacturer for various periods from 1977 to 2025. Since 2021, it fielded a factory-backed team, Alpine, which previously competed under the Renault name. In 1977, the company entered Formula One as a constructor, introducing the turbo engine to Formula One with its EF1 engine. In 1983, Renault began supplying engines to other teams. Although the Renault team had won races, it withdrew at the end of 1985.

Renault engines continued to be raced until 1986. Renault returned to Formula One in 1989 as an engine manufacturer. It won five drivers' titles and six constructors' titles between 1992 and 1997 with Williams and Benetton, before ending its works involvement after 1997, though their engines continued to be used without works backing until 2000. In 2000, Renault acquired the Enstone-based Benetton Formula team (formerly Toleman). Renault became a works engine manufacturer again in 2001, and in 2002 the Enstone-based team was re-branded as Renault. The team won the drivers' and constructors' championships in 2005 and 2006.

By 2011, Renault had sold its shares in the Enstone-based team, though it continued to use the Renault chassis name in 2011. Renault remained in the sport as an engine manufacturer, winning four drivers' and constructors' titles with Red Bull Racing between 2010 and 2013. The company bought the Enstone-based team again in 2016 and re-branded it as Renault. The team did not win in the following five seasons and was re-branded as Alpine in 2021 with the Renault marque remaining as engine manufacturer until 2025. As a team owner, Renault won two constructors' and drivers' championships, while as an engine manufacturer it had 12 constructors' and 11 drivers' championships. It collected over 160 wins as engine supplier, ranking fourth in Formula One history.

== Constructor ==
=== Équipe Renault (1977–1985) ===
==== 1977–1978: Laying a foundation for turbo revolution ====
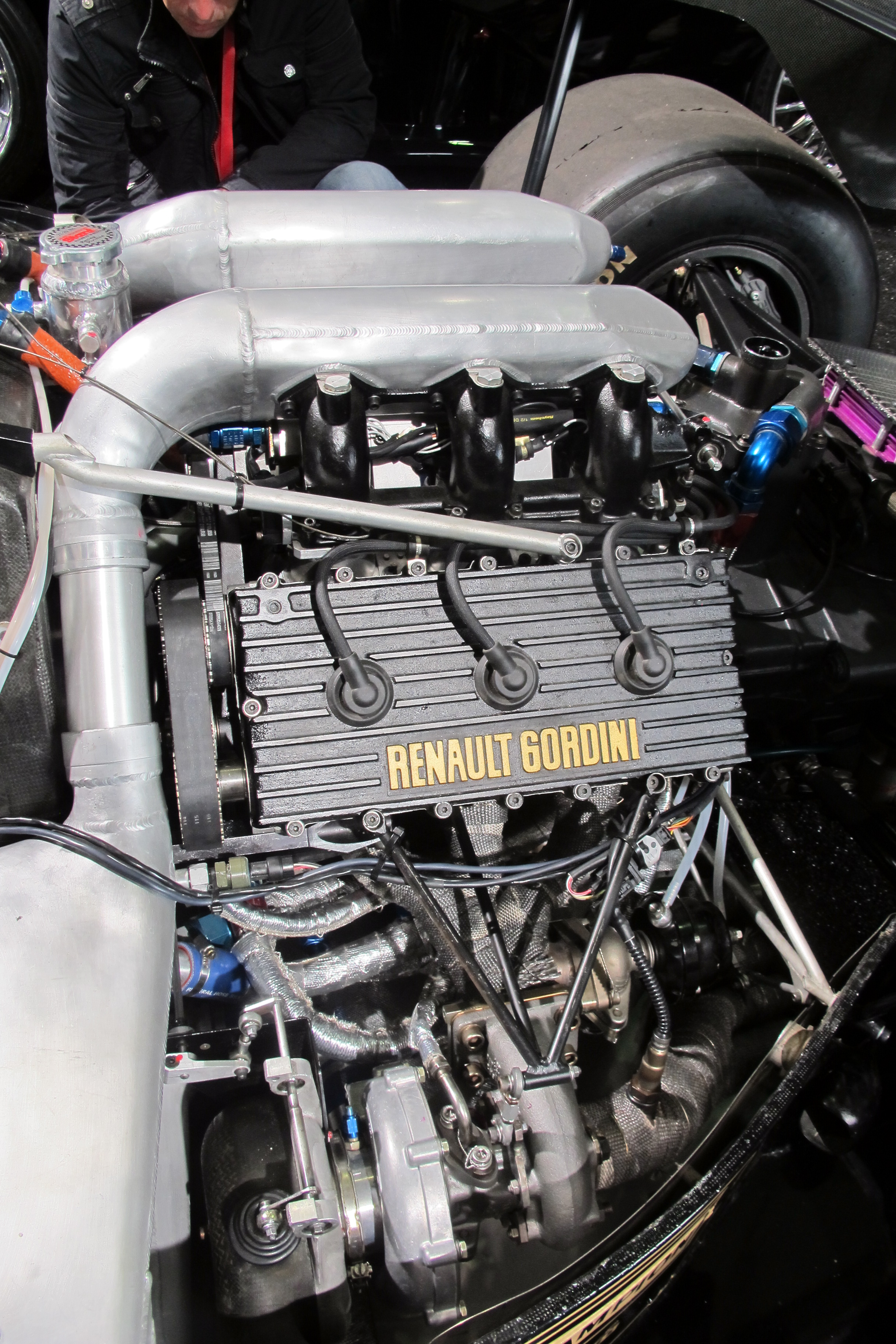
Renault 1.5-litre turbo engine

Renault's first involvement in Formula One was made by the Renault Sport subsidiary. Renault entered the last five races of 1977 with Jean-Pierre Jabouille in its only car. The Renault RS01 was well known for its Renault-Gordini V6 1.5 L turbocharged engine, the first regularly used turbo engine in Formula One history. Jabouille's car and engine proved highly unreliable and became something of a joke during its first races, earning the nickname of "Yellow Teapot" and failing to finish any of its races despite being comparatively powerful.

The first race the team entered, under the name Équipe Renault Elf, was the 1977 French Grand Prix, the ninth round of the season, but the car was not yet ready. The team's début was delayed until the following round, the British Grand Prix. The car's first qualifying session was not a success, and Jabouille qualified 21st out of the 30 runners and 26 starters, 1.62 seconds behind pole sitter James Hunt in the McLaren. Jabouille ran well in the race, running as high as 16th before the car's turbo failed on lap 17. The team missed the German and Austrian Grands Prix as the car was being improved after its British disappointment. They returned for the Dutch Grand Prix, and the qualifying performance was much improved as Jabouille qualified tenth. He had a poor start but ran as high as sixth before the suspension failed on lap 40.

The team's poor qualifying form returned in Italy, as Jabouille qualified 20th. He ran outside the top 10 until his engine failed on lap 24, continuing their awful run of reliability. Things improved at Watkins Glen for the United States Grand Prix as Jabouille qualified 14th, but the good pace from Zandvoort seemed to be gone as he once again ran outside the top 10 before retiring with yet another reliability problem, this time the alternator, on lap 31. Jabouille failed to qualify in Canada; as 27 drivers entered the race, only one would not qualify, and this was Jabouille as he ended up last, over 7.5 seconds behind the fastest qualifier Mario Andretti of Lotus, and almost two seconds behind his nearest rival, Rupert Keegan, in the Hesketh. After this, Renault did not travel to the season finale in Japan.

The following year was hardly better, characterised by four consecutive retirements caused by blown engines, but near the end of the year, the team showed signs of success. Twice, the RS01 qualified 3rd on the grid and while finishing was still something of an issue, it managed to finish its first race on the lead lap at Watkins Glen near the end of 1978, giving the team a fourth-place finish and its first Formula One points.

The team did not enter the first two races of 1978, in Argentina and Brazil, but returned for the South African Grand Prix at Kyalami. Jabouille secured Renault's best qualifying position to date, with sixth place, just 0.71 seconds behind polesitter Niki Lauda in the Brabham. He dropped out of the points early in the race before retiring with electrical problems on lap 39. At Long Beach, Jabouille qualified 13th but retired as the turbo failed again on lap 44. He was twelfth in qualifying for the team's first Monaco Grand Prix, and gave the team their first finish in Formula One, finishing in tenth place four laps down on race-winner Tyrrell's Patrick Depailler.

==== 1979 season: Win breakthrough on home soil ====
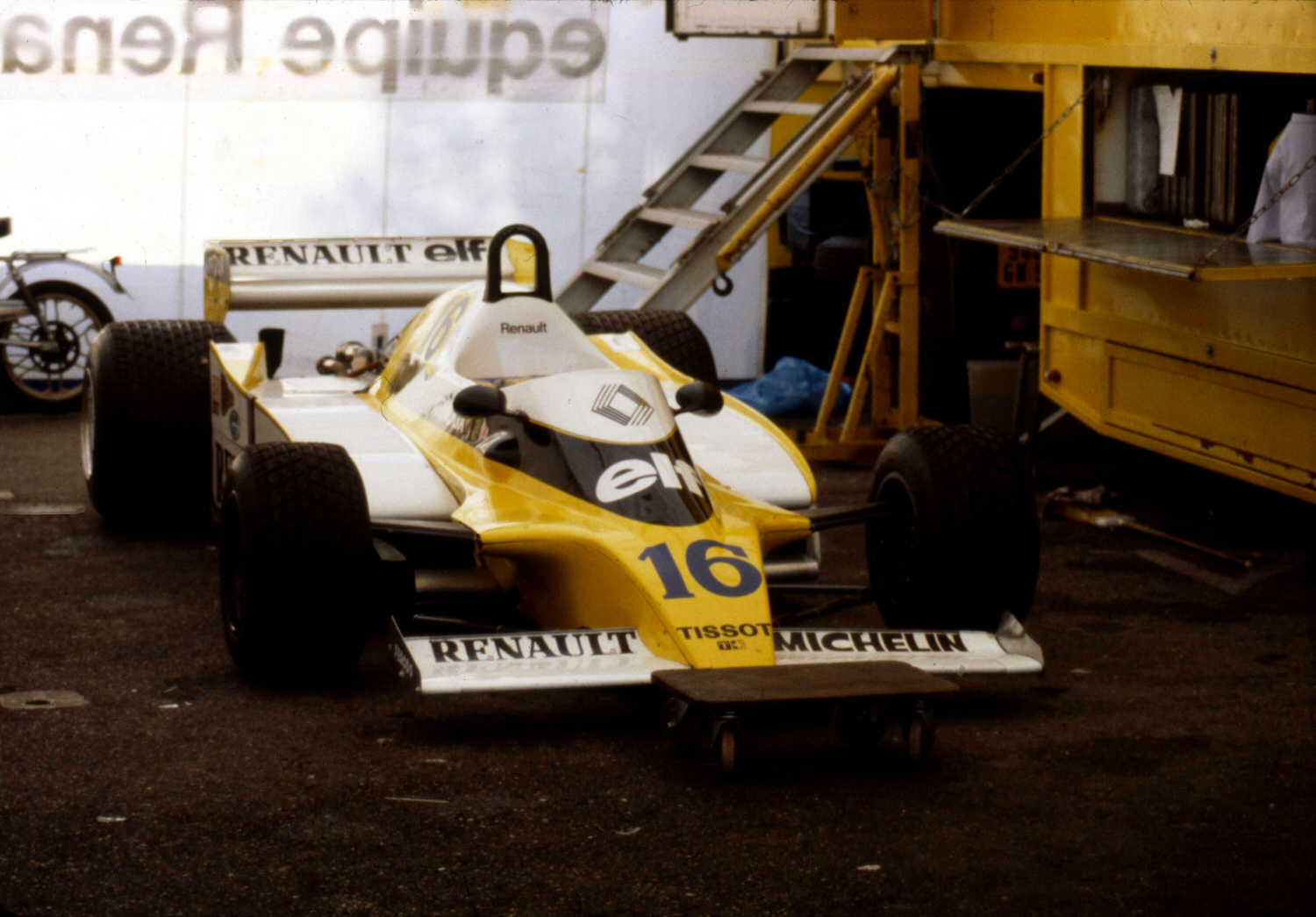
In 1979, the Renault RS10 became the first turbocharged car to win a Grand Prix.

Expanding to two drivers with René Arnoux joining Jabouille, the team continued to struggle although Jabouille earned a pole position in South Africa. By mid-season, both drivers had a new ground-effect car, the RS10, and at Dijon for the French Grand Prix the team legitimised itself with a brilliant performance in a classic race. The two Renaults were on the front row in qualifying, and pole-sitter Jabouille won the race, the first driver in a turbocharged car to do so, while Arnoux and Gilles Villeneuve were involved in an extremely competitive duel for second, Arnoux narrowly getting beaten to the line. While Jabouille ran into hard times after that race, Arnoux finished second at Silverstone in the following race and then repeated that at the Glen, proving it was not a fluke.

==== 1980–1983 seasons: Becoming an established frontrunner ====
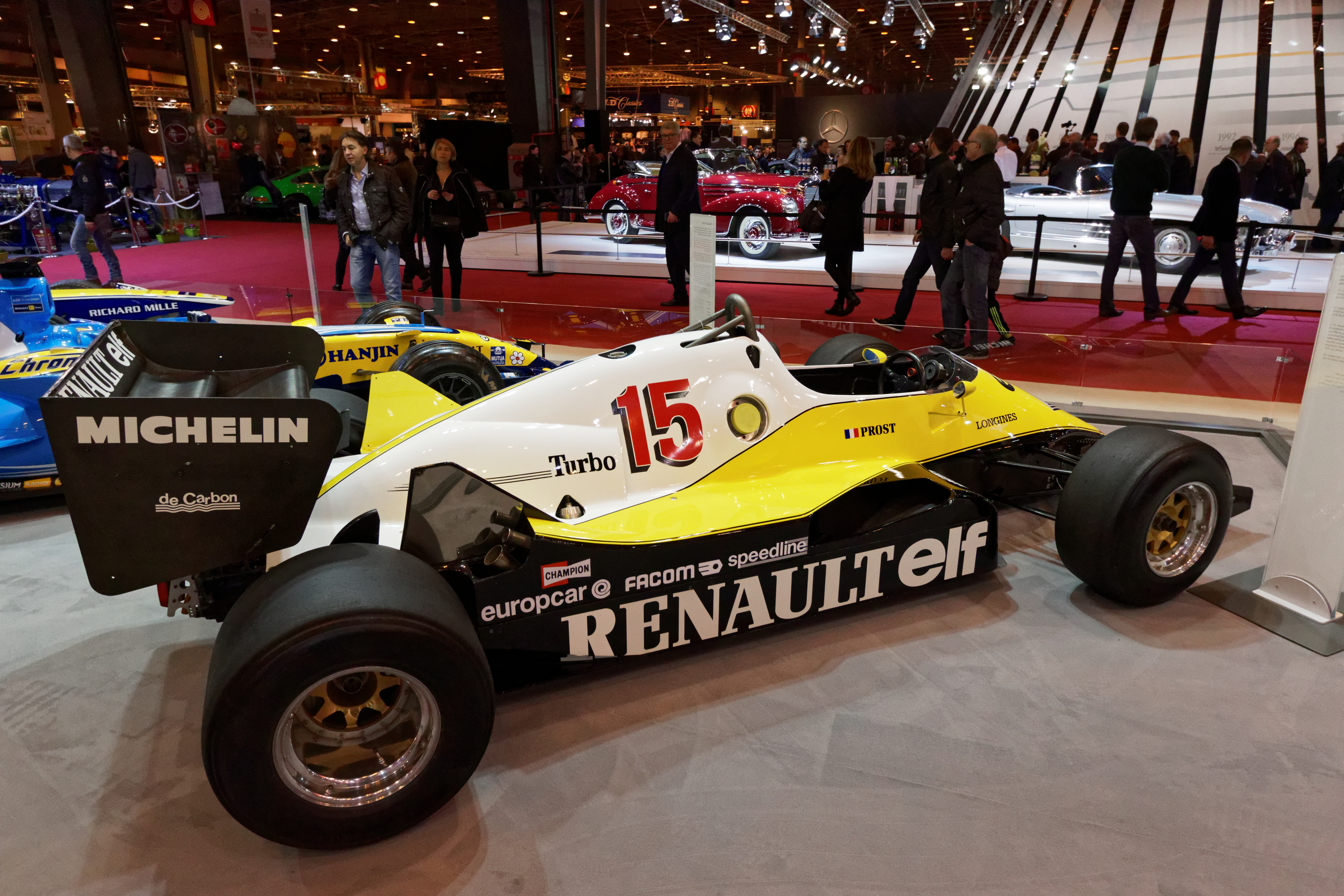
Alain Prost finished second in the 1983 championship with the Renault RE40.

Arnoux furthered this in 1980 with consecutive wins in Brazil and South Africa, both on high altitude circuits where the Renaults were dominant. Jabouille continued to have problems with retirements, but in his only points finish he emerged victorious in Austria. At the end of the year, Jabouille crashed heavily at the Canadian GP and suffered serious leg injuries, which effectively ended his career as a Grand Prix driver. Alain Prost was signed up for 1981. In his three years with the team, Prost showed the form that would make him a Formula One legend and the Renaults were among the best in Formula One, twice finishing third in the Constructors' Championships and once second. Prost won nine races with the team, while Arnoux added two more in 1982. Arnoux left for rival Ferrari after 1982 and was replaced by American Eddie Cheever. In 1983, Renault and Prost came very close to winning the drivers' title but were edged out by Nelson Piquet (Brabham-BMW) at the last race of the season in South Africa. After the end of the season, a rival fuel company said that the fuel used by the Brabham-BMWs in South Africa had exceeded the maximum Research Octane Number of 102 permitted under the Formula One regulations. BMW said that this was incorrect and FISA released a dossier supporting their stance. No action was taken.

==== 1984–1985 seasons: Post-Prost decline and works team exit ====
Prost was fired two days after the 1983 season following his public comments about the team's lack of development of the Renault RE40 which resulted in his loss to Piquet and the team's loss to Ferrari in the 1983 championship. He subsequently joined McLaren, while Cheever left to join Alfa Romeo. The team turned to Frenchman Patrick Tambay (who had left Ferrari) and Englishman Derek Warwick (formerly of Toleman) to bring them back to prominence. Despite a few good results, including Tambay giving the team its last pole position at the 1984 French Grand Prix at Dijon, the team was not as competitive in 1984 and 1985 as in the past, with other teams doing a better job with turbo engines, or more specifically Lotus and to a lesser extent Ligier. 1985 provided another F1 first, as the team ran a third car in Germany at the new Nürburgring that featured the first in-car camera which could be viewed live by a television audience. Driven by Frenchman François Hesnault, the car only lasted 8 laps before a clutch problem forced it to retire (the last race on which a team entered three cars for a race). In 1985, major financial problems emerged at Renault and the company could no longer justify the large expenses needed to maintain the racing team's competitiveness. CEO Georges Besse pared down the company's involvement in F1 from full-fledged racing team to engine supplier for the 1986 season before taking it entirely out of F1 at the end of that year.

=== Renault F1 Team and Lotus Renault GP (2002–2011): The rise and fall of the first Enstone era ===
==== Purchase of and transition from Benetton Formula (2000–2001) ====
On 16 March 2000, the Renault-Nissan Alliance through the Renault brand purchased Benetton Formula Limited for $120 million, to return to Formula One. The history of the team acquired by Renault started in 1981 as the Toleman Motorsport team, based in Witney, Oxfordshire, England. In 1986, the team was renamed to Benetton Formula, following its purchase in 1985 by the Benetton family. In 1992/3 the team moved a few miles to a new base in Enstone. Renault continued to use the Benetton constructor name for the 2000 and the 2001 seasons, with the Renault name returning in 2001 as an engine brand. When reporting the purchase the International Herald Tribune commented that "the team will not race under the Renault name until it is ready to win and reap the marketing benefits". It was not until 2002 that this name change occurred.

==== First seasons under a new name (2002–2004) ====
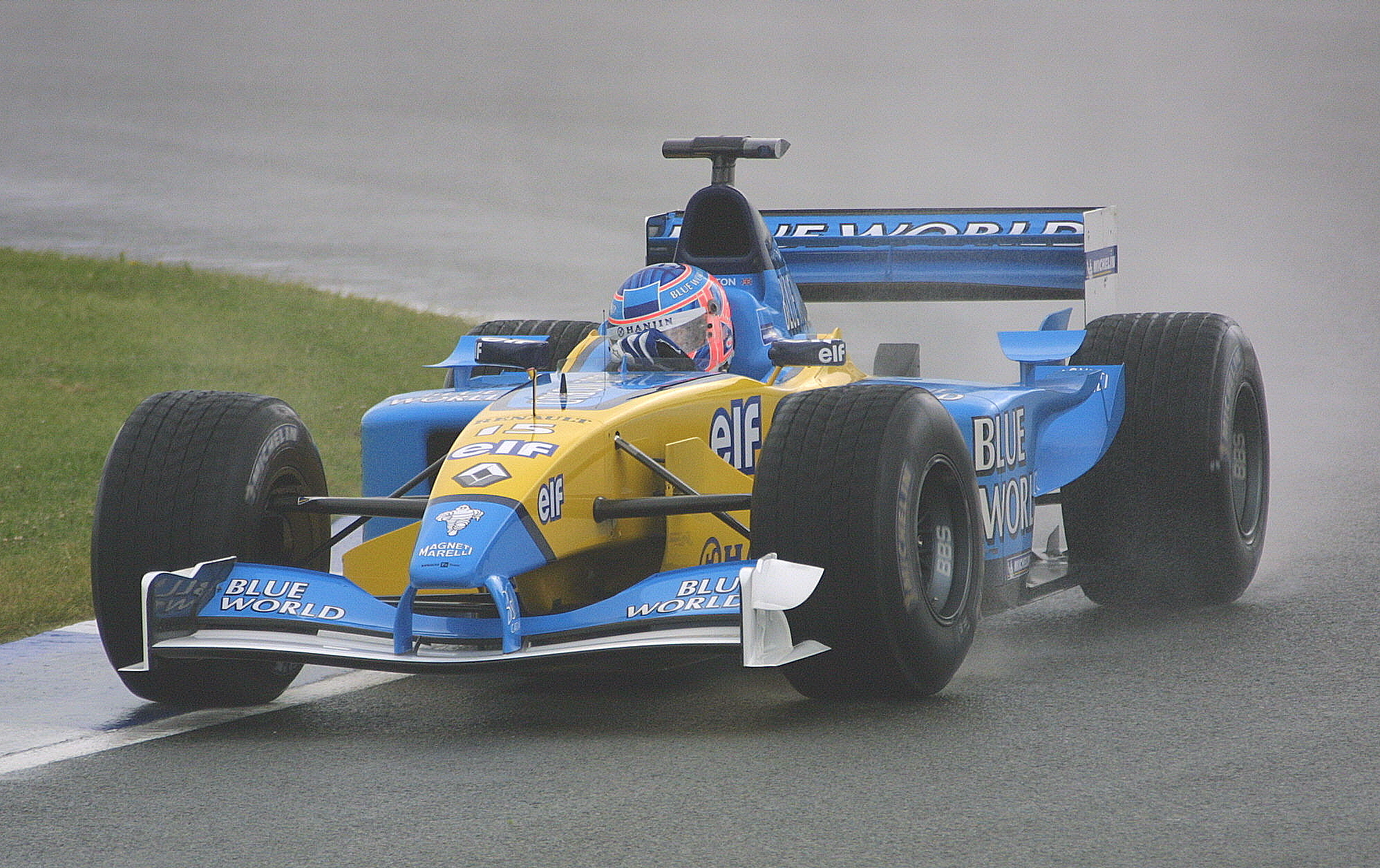
Jenson Button at the 2002 British Grand Prix

In 2002, Benetton was rebranded as Renault F1 and contested the season with drivers Jarno Trulli and Jenson Button who scored 23 points during the season. As a result of rebranding, Renault also received a French racing licence instead of an Italian licence held by the Benetton team since 1996.

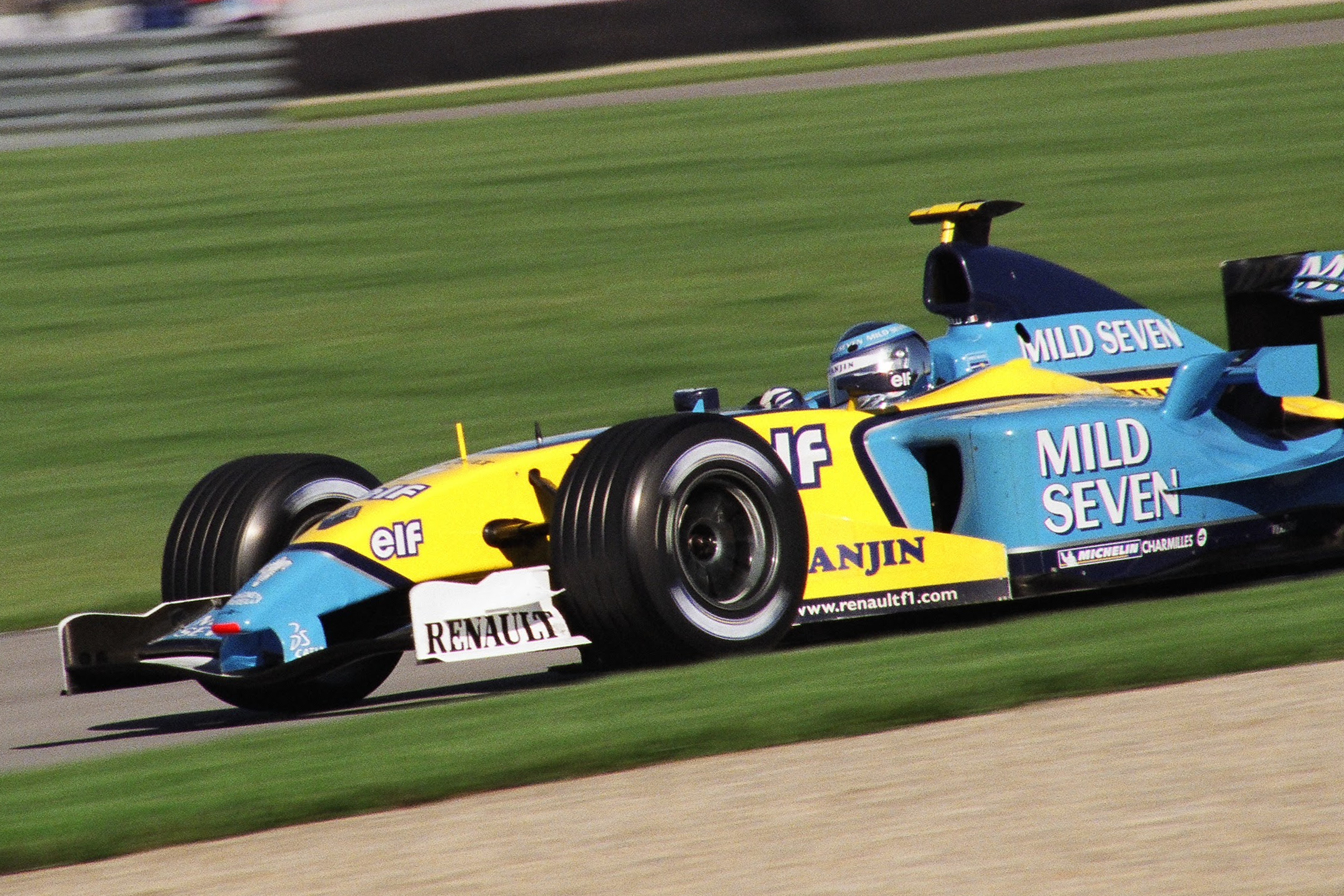
Jarno Trulli driving for Renault at the 2003 United States Grand Prix.

Despite outscoring his teammate during 2002, Button was dropped by Renault in 2003. His replacement was Spain's Fernando Alonso, who had been considered impressive as a test driver the previous year. Alonso won the 2003 Hungarian Grand Prix, the first time Renault had won a Grand Prix since the 1983 Austrian Grand Prix. Renault was innovative during this period producing non-standard designs such as the 111° 10-cylinder engine for the 2003 RS23 which was designed to effectively lower the centre of gravity of the engine and thus improve the car's handling. This eventually proved too unreliable and heavy, so Renault returned to a more conventional development route.

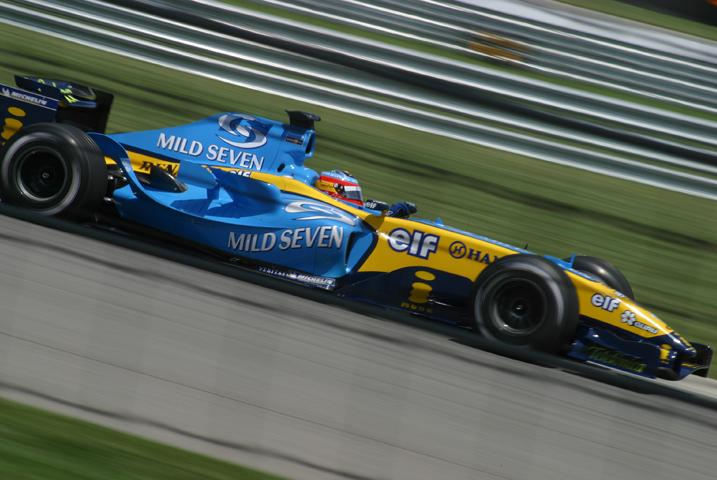
Fernando Alonso driving for Renault at the 2004 United States Grand Prix.

In 2004, the team were contenders for second place in the Constructors' Championship. Trulli won the Monaco Grand Prix, but his relationship with Renault (particularly with team principal and Trulli's ex-manager Flavio Briatore) deteriorated after he was consistently off the pace in the latter half of the year, and made claims of favouritism in the team towards Alonso (though the two teammates themselves remained friendly).

Commentators regularly point to the French Grand Prix as the final straw for Briatore, where Trulli was overtaken by Rubens Barrichello in the final stages of the last lap, costing Renault a double podium finish at their home Grand Prix. He subsequently announced he was joining Toyota for the following year and in fact left Renault early, driving the Toyota in the last two races of the 2004 season. Hoping to secure second place in the Constructors' Championship, Renault replaced Trulli with 1997 World Champion Jacques Villeneuve for the final three races. However, Villeneuve – away from F1 racing for almost an entire season and struggling to acclimatise quickly to racing at the premier level – did not impress, and the team finished third behind Villeneuve's former team BAR.

==== Back to back double championship success (2005–2006) ====
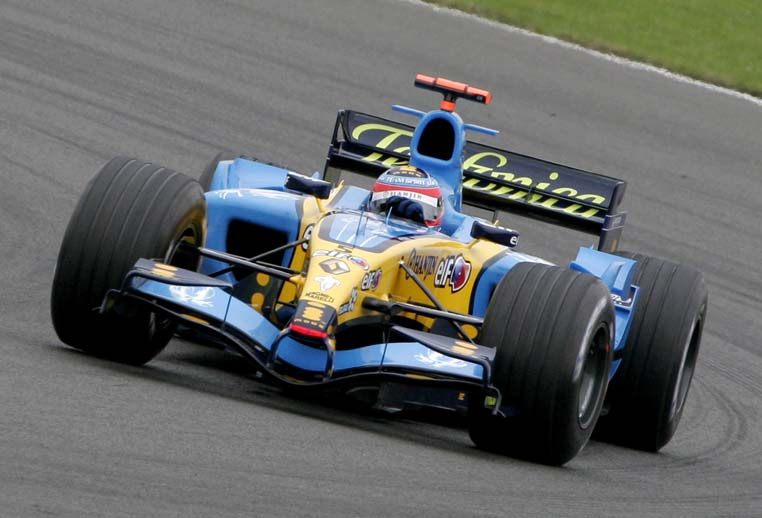
Fernando Alonso driving for Renault at the 2005 British Grand Prix.

Giancarlo Fisichella was Trulli's replacement for the 2005 season. He took advantage of a rain-affected qualifying session to win the first race of the season, the Australian Grand Prix. Fernando Alonso then won the next three races to build a considerable lead in the Drivers' World Championship, thereby doing the same for Renault in the Constructors' Championship. Meanwhile, Fisichella failed to finish several races. After the San Marino Grand Prix, Renault and Alonso's championship leads came under attack from a fast-but-fragile McLaren-Mercedes team and Kimi Räikkönen respectively for the Drivers' Championship. McLaren took the lead of the Constructors' World Championship by securing a one-two finish at the Brazilian Grand Prix, but that was to be the race in which Alonso secured the Drivers' title, becoming the youngest ever driver to do so. This achievement was followed by a win in China to secure the Constructors' World Championship for Renault after McLaren driver Juan Pablo Montoya's car was badly damaged by a drain cover coming loose on the track. This broke Ferrari's six-year stranglehold on that title. It was the first time Renault had won the title as a manufacturer, and Renault became only the second French constructor (after the triumph of Matra in 1969) and the first French-licensed team to win the title.

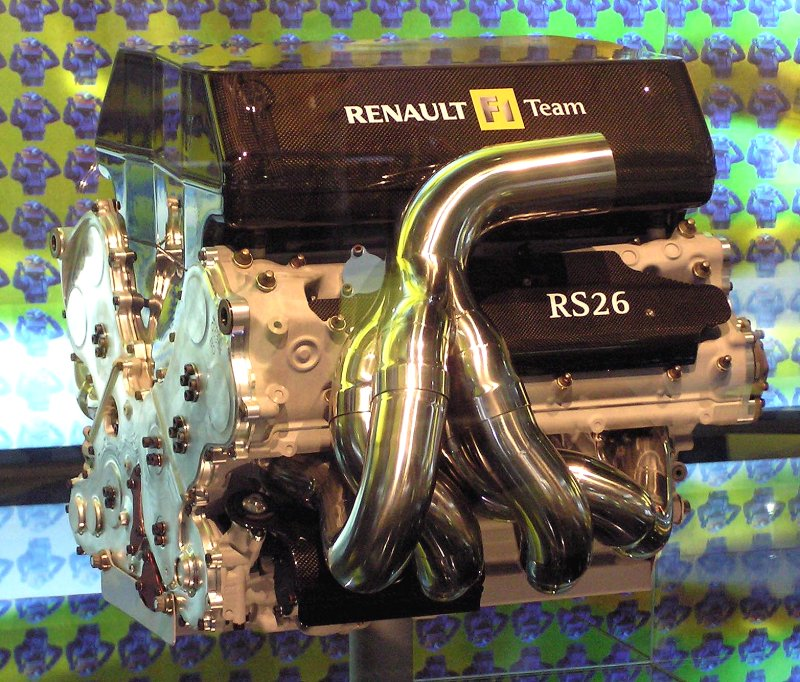
The Renault team's 2006 engine, the RS26. Renault's first V8 engine in Formula One.

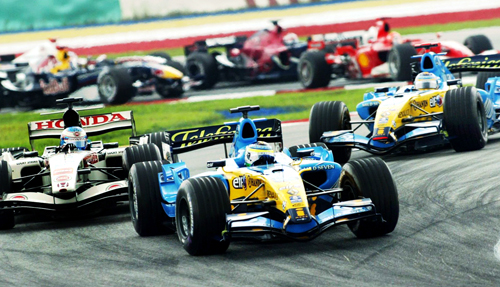
Giancarlo Fisichella won the 2006 Malaysian Grand Prix for Renault.

Fernando Alonso and Giancarlo Fisichella were retained for 2006, while test driver Franck Montagny was replaced by Heikki Kovalainen. The team's 2006 contender, the R26 – featuring a seven-speed gearbox made of titanium, was unveiled at a launch event on 31 January.

Alonso won the opening Bahrain Grand Prix as well as the Australian Grand Prix and finished second in Malaysia behind teammate Fisichella to claim Renault's first one-two finish since René Arnoux and Alain Prost in 1982. Alonso took two more second places, and then wins at his home Grand Prix in Spain, and at the Monaco Grand Prix. Fisichella took 8th, 6th and 3rd-place finishes in the San Marino Grand Prix, European Grand Prix and the Spanish Grand Prix.

The team celebrated its 200th Grand Prix at Silverstone, which was won by Alonso. As the season progressed to its North American stint, Alonso won the Canadian Grand Prix in Montreal, Canada. At the U.S. Grand Prix, Ferrari had a distinct performance advantage over the whole weekend. However, Renault were the fastest of all the Michelin runners. Fisichella finished 3rd, while Alonso finished 5th.

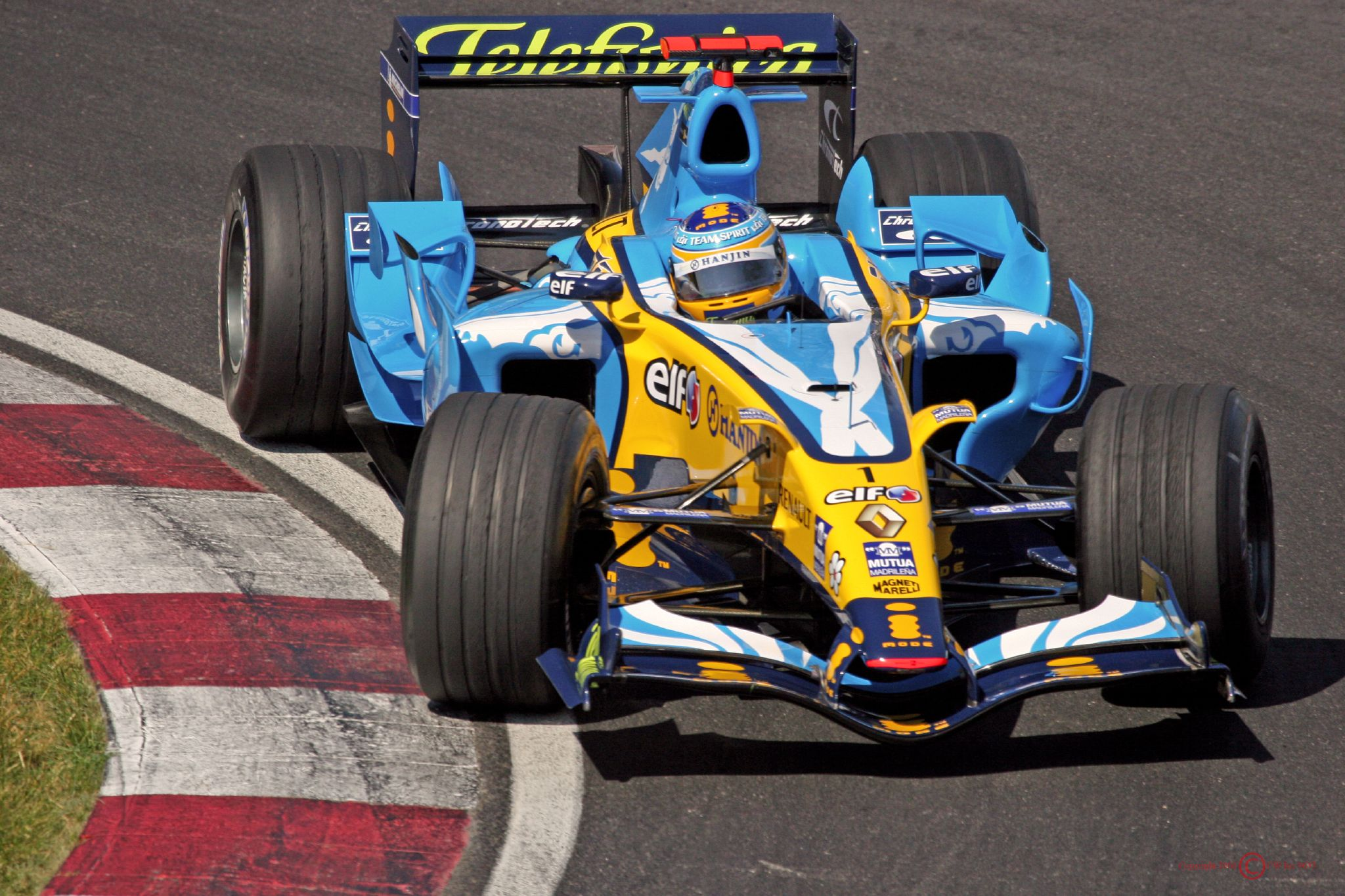
Fernando Alonso on his way to victory at the 2006 Canadian Grand Prix.

At the French Grand Prix, Renault was expected to be faster than Ferrari, but Ferrari again had the advantage. Alonso ran third for most of the race, unable to challenge the Ferraris of Schumacher and Massa. However, a tactical switch to a two-stop strategy enabled him to pass Massa and finish second.

On 21 July 2006, the FIA banned the use of mass damper systems, developed and first used by Renault and subsequently used by 7 other teams, including Ferrari. Flavio Briatore claimed that McLaren had raised the issue of the system's legality with the FIA. The system used a spring-mounted mass in the nose cone to reduce the sensitivity of the car to vibration. This was particularly effective in corners and over kerbs to keep the tyres in closer contact to the track surface than they would otherwise be. However race stewards at the German Grand Prix deemed the system legal. The FIA announced its intention to appeal that decision and Renault announced they would not race with the system for fear of retrospective punishment if the appeal was upheld. Renault's performance at the German Grand Prix was one of their worst of the season; however, the team blamed blistering of their Michelin tyres rather than the loss of the mass damper system. The FIA International Court of Appeal met in Paris on 22 August 2006, to examine the appeal made by the FIA against the decision of the German Grand Prix stewards. The Court ruled that the use of the device known as a Tuned Mass Damper is an infringement of Article 3.15 of the Formula One Technical Regulations.

Points scored in the Brazilian Grand Prix secured the Constructors' Championship for Renault in 2006.

On 16 October 2006, Renault announced that the Dutch banking giant ING would replace Mild Seven as title sponsor for three years starting in 2007.

==== Decline in fortunes and race-fixing scandal (2007–2009) ====
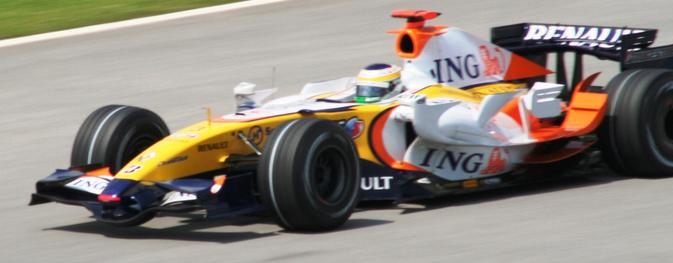
Giancarlo Fisichella driving for Renault at the 2007 Malaysian Grand Prix.

Renault confirmed Giancarlo Fisichella and Heikki Kovalainen as their race drivers for 2007 with Nelson Piquet Jr. and Ricardo Zonta as test drivers. The car for 2007, the R27, was unveiled on 24 January 2007 in Amsterdam and bore a new yellow, blue, orange and white livery in deference to the corporate colours of ING, the Dutch financial group based in Amsterdam. Renault engines were also supplied to the Red Bull Racing team for the 2007 season.

Renault struggled in comparison to their form in previous seasons in Australia, with Giancarlo Fisichella finishing the race in 5th place. Rookie Heikki Kovalainen struggled even more than the Italian, spinning his car as he chased Toyota's Ralf Schumacher and ending up in 10th place. Results did not improve until the start of the European season, although both drivers finished in the points in the next race at Malaysia. Heikki Kovalainen struggled in Bahrain too, although the gap between himself and Fisichella at the end of the race was not as great as was seen at Melbourne, with Fisichella finishing only 8th. The team's pace began to pick up in Barcelona, with both drivers making it into Q3, setting competitive lap times in the race (4th fastest lap for Kovalainen) and looking set for 5th and 8th, only to be hampered by an identical problem on both fuel rigs, forcing both drivers to make extra pitstops which dropped them back to 7th and 9th. This glimmer of hope proved a false dawn and the Renault team never posed a serious threat to the dominant Ferrari and McLaren teams for the remainder of the 2007 season and were also often outclassed by the much improved BMW Sauber team. In contrast to the back to back drivers and constructors championship wins of the previous two seasons, 2007 would see the Renault team score just one podium all season courtesy of rookie Kovalainen who finished in second place behind fellow rookie Lewis Hamilton at the rain soaked Japanese Grand Prix at Fuji Speedway. The team would place a distant third in the 2007 constructors standings with 51 points well behind Ferrari and BMW Sauber in terms of points scored whilst also benefitting from McLaren's expulsion from the constructors standings due to the Formula One espionage controversy.

On 8 November 2007, the FIA accused Renault F1 of having McLaren F1 technical information in their possession. According to the charge, the information in hand "included the layout and critical dimensions of the McLaren car as well as details of McLaren's fuelling system, gear assembly, hydraulic control system and suspension". The hearing on this matter took place in Monaco on 6 December 2007. The charge faced by Renault F1 – breaching of article 151c of the Sporting Regulations – was the same as that faced by McLaren earlier on in 2007 in the espionage controversy involving Ferrari & McLaren. The FIA found Renault F1 in breach of article 151c but did not penalise the team.

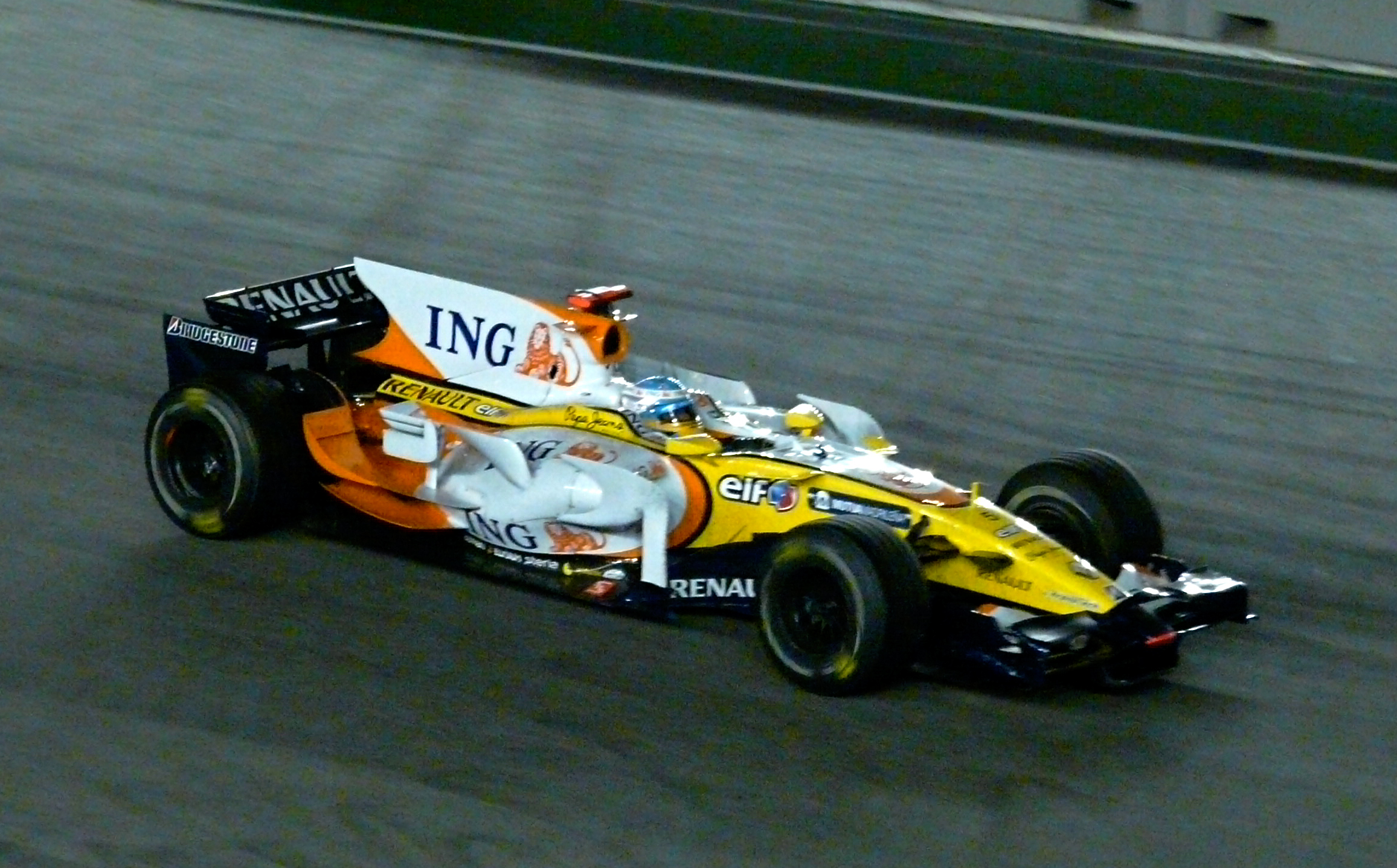
Fernando Alonso cruising to victory at the 2008 Singapore Grand Prix.

It was announced on 10 December 2007 that Fernando Alonso would rejoin with Renault F1 for 2008. Alonso drove alongside promoted test driver Nelson Piquet Jr. and was believed to have secured number one status within the team. The team similarly started in 2008 as the year before; Fernando Alonso managed to garner fourth at the opening Australian Grand Prix as a result of a mistake from a previous Renault employee Heikki Kovalainen. However, the form was still short of 2006 by a large degree over the first half of the 2008 season. The team brought new parts to the Spanish Grand Prix, including a new engine-cover, dubbed the "Shark-fin", similar to the one introduced by Red Bull on their RB4. Alonso managed to qualify on the front row for that race on a light fuel-load, yet retired with an engine failure halfway through. Alonso's front row qualifying performance in Spain was a rare moment of achievement from the former World Champion. Both cars retired at the Canadian Grand Prix and Nelson Piquet Jr., who retired from six of the first nine races, failed to score until the French Grand Prix.

The German Grand Prix heralded a change in the team's fortune. Piquet Jr. benefited from the deployment of the safety car to secure Renault's first podium of the year with a second. Both drivers scored at the Hungarian Grand Prix although they failed to pick up anything at Valencia two weeks later. Two fourth places for Alonso in Belgium and Italy were a prelude to the Singapore Grand Prix, in which Alonso profited from the early crash of his teammate (later revealed to be a deliberate crash to aid the Spaniard. See: Renault Formula One crash controversy) to claim his first victory of the season, and Renault's first since the 2006 Japanese Grand Prix. This victory made Alonso and Renault the first-ever winners of a Formula One race held under floodlights. Renault underlined their return to the front at the subsequent Japanese Grand Prix, in which Alonso steered clear of Lewis Hamilton's first-corner mistake to record another win. Piquet Jr. finished fourth in the team's best performance of the season. Further double points finish in China was followed by Alonso's second-place finish at the season-ending Brazilian Grand Prix. The Renault R28 was believed by many insiders to have overtaken BMW Sauber by season's end as the closest challenger to the domination of the sport by Ferrari and McLaren.

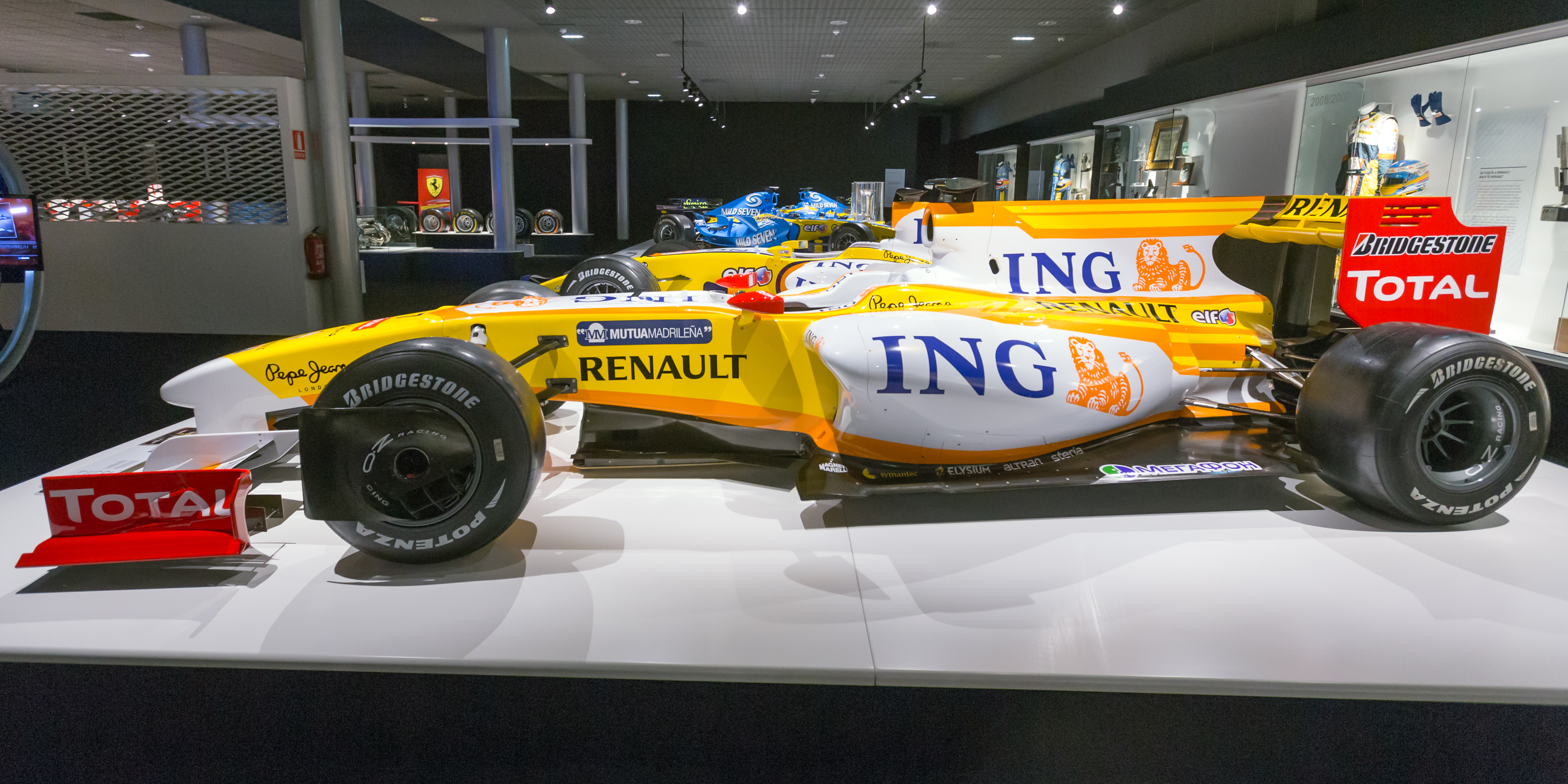
Renault R29 left 2017 Museo Fernando Alonso

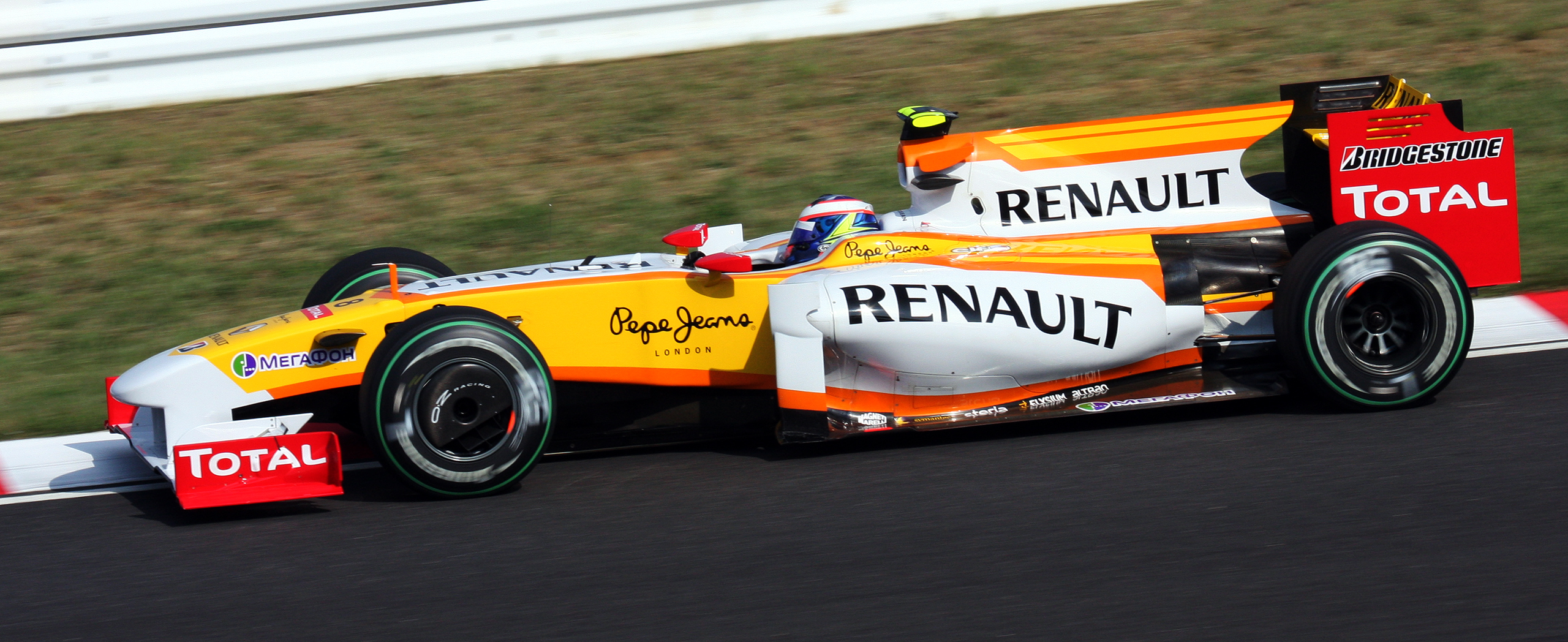
Then rookie Romain Grosjean driving for Renault at the 2009 Japanese Grand Prix.

Renault entered the season with high hopes of challenging both world titles. Although Alonso managed four points finishes in the first six races, it was soon clear that this target was unrealistic. By mid-season, it appeared as though Renault were making progress, with Alonso setting the fastest lap in Germany and securing pole position in Hungary, albeit on a light fuel load. However, Alonso was forced to retire early in Hungary due to a fuel pump failure, after a front wheel came loose as it was incorrectly fitted at his first pit stop. At Belgium Alonso again looked like scoring a podium for the team but had to retire with another problem with one of his wheels which was damaged as a result of a first-lap clash with Adrian Sutil. Piquet performed poorly in the first half of the season and was replaced by Romain Grosjean for the last third of the season. Neither Piquet nor Grosjean managed to score a point. A podium in Singapore was little consolation in what had been a frustrating and controversial season for the team. Renault had been suspended for one race (the 2009 European Grand Prix) due to the incident involving Fernando Alonso's wheel not being fitted properly in the 2009 Hungarian Grand Prix, however, this has been overturned on appeal following a decision from the FIA on 17 August 2009.

On 4 August, Nelson Piquet Jr. was told by Renault he would not continue driving for them for the rest of the season. "I have received notice from Renault of its intention to stop me from driving for them in the current F1 season", read a statement on Piquet's website. Piquet had described the 2009 season as "the worst period of my career" and had criticised team boss Flavio Briatore. He was replaced by test driver Romain Grosjean as of the European Grand Prix.

After his first podium of the year in Singapore, Fernando Alonso confirmed that he would be leaving Renault, moving to Ferrari in 2010.

Race rigging allegations

The ING Renault F1 Team will not dispute the recent allegations made by the FIA concerning the 2008 Singapore Grand Prix.

It also wishes to state that its managing director, Flavio Briatore and its executive director of engineering, Pat Symonds, have left the team.

— Renault F1 statement, 16 September 2009

During the 2009 season, the actions of Renault F1 during the 2008 season were examined over alleged race-fixing. The issue surrounded Nelson Piquet Jr.'s crash during the 2008 Singapore Grand Prix which Renault teammate Fernando Alonso went on to win. At the time, Piquet Jr. had characterised the incident as a simple mistake. After Piquet Jr. left the Renault team in August 2009, allegations surfaced that this crash had been deliberate, to give an advantage to Alonso. Following a Fédération Internationale de l'Automobile (FIA) investigation in which Piquet Jr. stated he had been asked by Renault team principal Flavio Briatore and engineer Pat Symonds to stage the crash, on 4 September 2009 Renault were charged with conspiracy and race-fixing and were due to face the FIA World Motor Sport Council in Paris on 21 September 2009. Initially, Renault and Briatore stated they would take legal action against Piquet Jr. for making false allegations, however, before the meeting, Renault announced they would not contest the charges, and that Briatore and Symonds had left the team. At the meeting, the Council banned Renault from Formula One, but suspended this sanction for two years, meaning Renault would have been thrown out of Formula One if a similar incident occurred before the end of the 2011 season. FIA stated that Renault would have likely been thrown out of Formula One if it had not taken swift action in pushing out Briatore and Symonds. At the same meeting, Briatore was banned from FIA events for life, while Symonds received a five-year ban. The bans on Briatore and Symonds were subsequently overturned by a French court in 2010. FIA, Briatore and Symonds reached a settlement that allowed Briatore and Symonds to return to FIA in 2011 and to Formula One in 2013.

==== Team sale amid Kubica promise (2010) ====
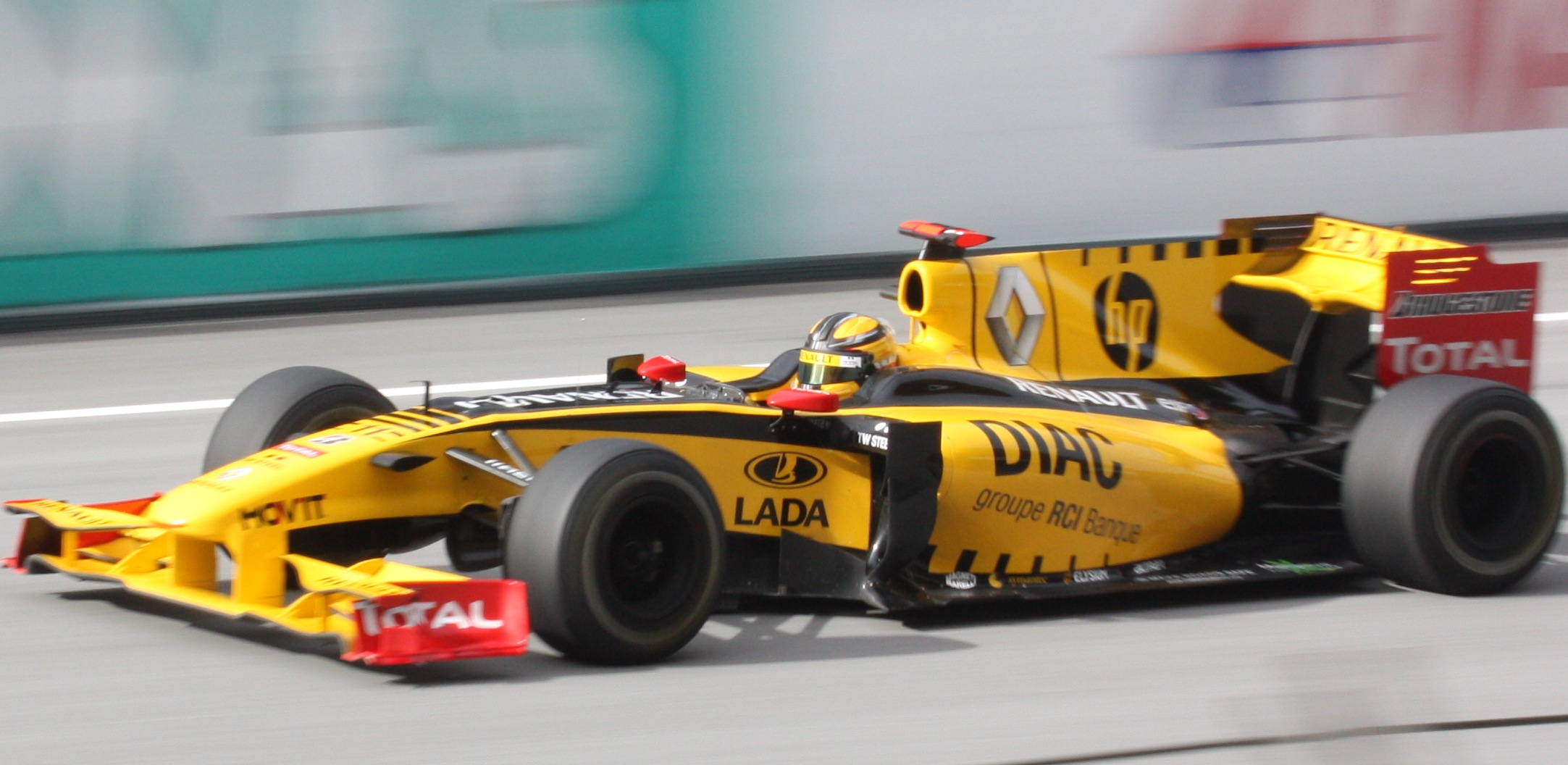
Robert Kubica driving for Renault at the 2010 Malaysian Grand Prix.

In 2010, Renault sold a majority stake in the team to Genii Capital, a Luxembourg based investment company. However Renault still retained a 25% share in the team and continued as an engine supplier. Red Bull Racing confirmed they would be using Renault engines for 2010. Robert Kubica was signed as Alonso's replacement on 7 October 2009, but following the shareholding deal, Kubica and his manager Daniel Morelli asked for clarification on the management structure before committing to the outfit. However, in the new year, clarification was sought and Kubica was ready to commit to the outfit. On 31 January, Vitaly Petrov was signed to be Kubica's teammate, becoming Russia's first Formula One driver.

On 5 January, Éric Boullier was announced as the new team principal at Renault, replacing Bob Bell, who would return to his former role as Technical Director.

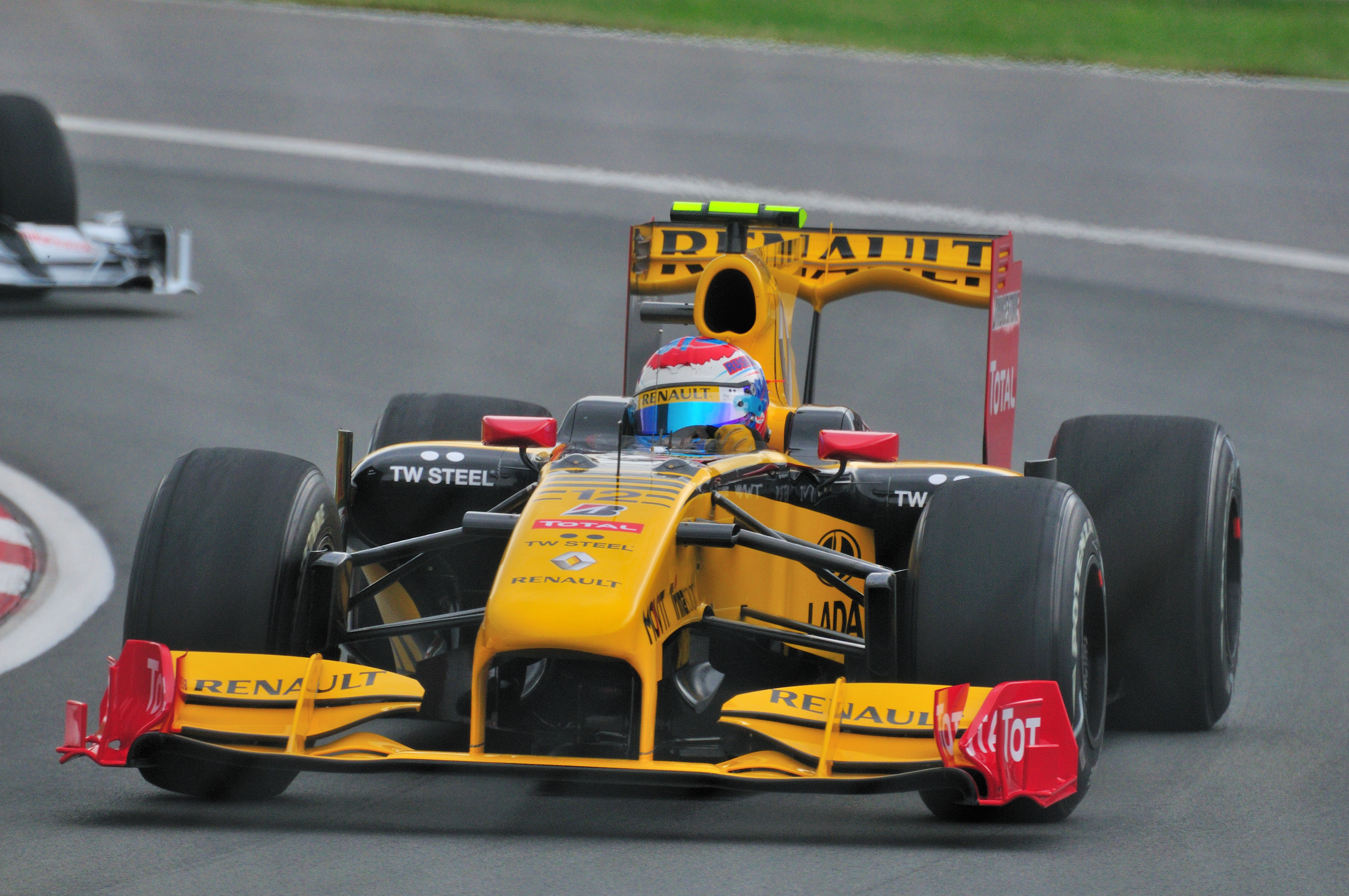
Vitaly Petrov in the Senna corner at the 2010 Canadian Grand Prix.

At the opening round in Bahrain, Petrov retired with broken suspension while in the pit lane on lap 14, and Kubica finished in eleventh place.

Kubica took his first podium with the team, with a second-place finish in Australia. Petrov retired from the race, after spinning off the circuit.

Kubica finished the next 3 races in the points, a 4th place in Malaysia, 5th place in Shanghai, and 8th place in Barcelona. Petrov meanwhile scored his first points in Formula 1 in China with his 7th place, it could have been more, but he spun off whilst in fourth, yet he still recovered to bring some points home.

After setting fast times on Thursday and the fastest time in Saturday's practice session, followed by 2nd place in qualifying, Kubica finished in 3rd place in Monaco, just 1.6 seconds behind the winner. Petrov retired in the closing laps of the race but was still classified 13th.

Vitaly Petrov was out-qualified and out-raced by Robert Kubica at almost every race. However, Petrov did find considerable form at the Hungarian Grand Prix when he out-qualified Kubica for the first time and finished the race 5th. However, in Belgium, Petrov made a mistake that ended with a crash in the first session of qualifying when he explored the kerbs at Liege corner, claiming he was testing to see how wet they were and if they were usable on his flying lap. His failure to set a time placed him 24th on the grid, though a gearbox penalty to Sauber's Pedro de la Rosa promoted him to 23rd. However, he went on to finish ninth, resulting in three consecutive points finishes in a row. In Singapore, Petrov was running seventh before being pushed off by Nico Hülkenberg, whilst Kubica was forced to make an unscheduled stop late in the race with a puncture, before going on to recover almost every place he had lost.

Rumours had tipped 2007 World Champion Kimi Räikkönen to replace Petrov for 2011, but the Finn angrily rejected claims he would join the team, stating that he was upset Renault was using his name for their image and that their actions meant he would not race for them.

==== Lotus Renault GP: Renault steps back (2011) ====
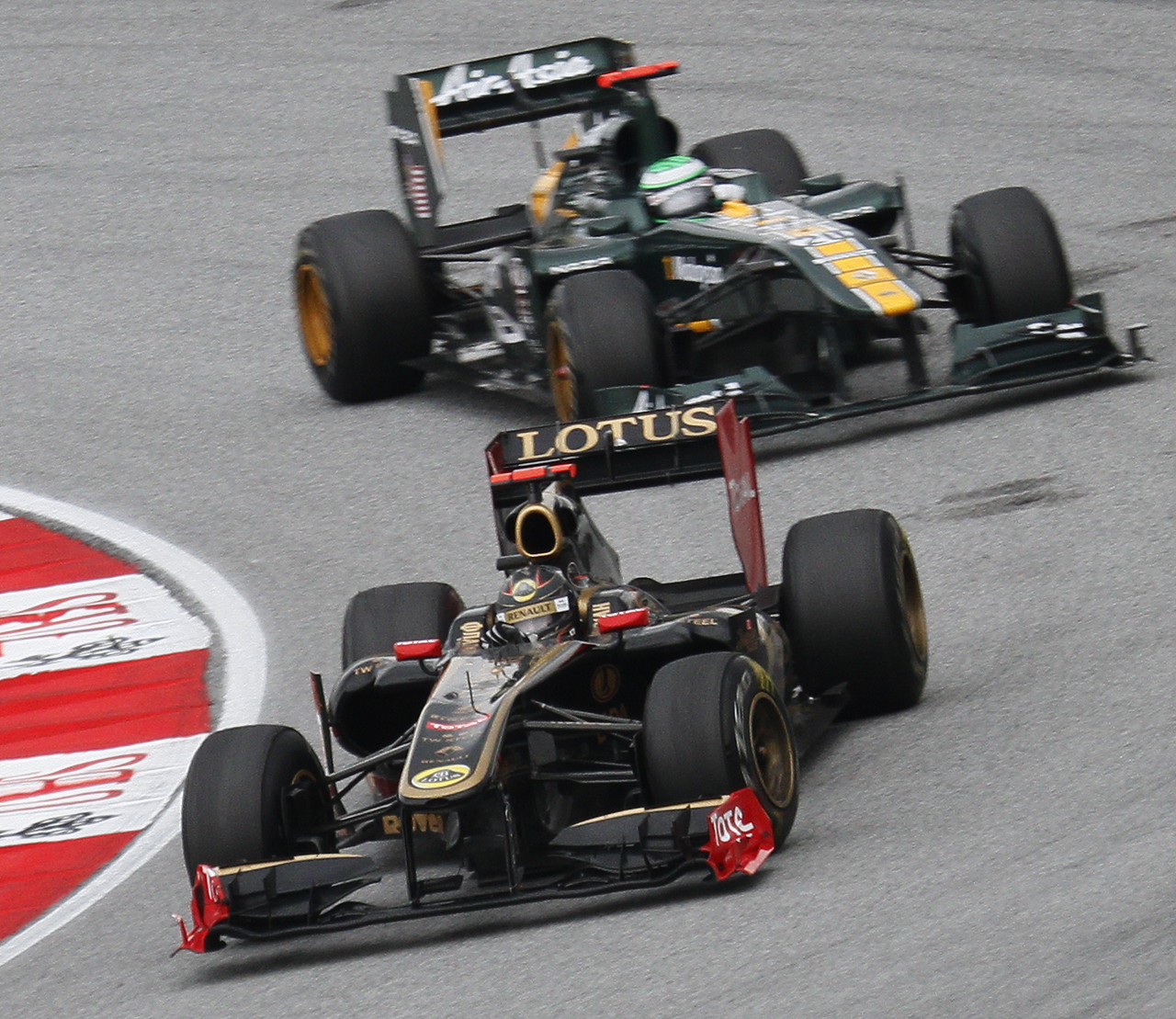
Nick Heidfeld leads Heikki Kovalainen (Team Lotus) at the 2011 Malaysian Grand Prix, Group Lotus's sponsorship of Renault in 2011 led to a court dispute over naming rights between the two teams.

On 5 November 2010, Autosport reported that Renault was poised to scale back its involvement in 2011 and become only an engine supplier, with the team closing in on a tie-up with Lotus Cars to buy its 25% stake in the team. The deal was finalised in early December 2010, with the team to be renamed Lotus Renault GP for 2011, under a sponsorship deal signed with Lotus Cars until 2017. Renault continued to support the team by supplying engines and its expertise and thus Red Bull Racing was promoted to Renault's full-works partnership team. The Renault chassis name continued to be used, with Renault branding featuring in the new black and gold livery that was last used when Renault and Lotus joined forces in the 1980s, harking back to the John Player Special livery of the time. Despite being rebranded to Lotus, Renault still supplied free engines for the Lotus team until 2014.

During 2011, the team raced against another team that was using the Lotus name. The team which raced in the 2010 season as Lotus Racing (using a licence from Group Lotus which was later terminated by Group Lotus) rebranded itself as "Team Lotus" for the 2011 season after purchasing the privately owned rights to the historic name.

In January 2011, team principal Éric Boullier announced that the team would race under a British licence in 2011, having raced as a French outfit since Renault took over in 2002. This left the sport without any team racing under a French licence for the first time since the 1975 season. Group Lotus had yet to purchase a stake in the team, but had an option to do so by the end of 2012. Along with the launch of their new car, Lotus Renault GP announced that they had hired Jean Alesi as an ambassador for the team and test driver for the T125 single-seater project.

On 6 February 2011, Robert Kubica was severely injured in an accident during a rally in Italy. It was unclear if he would be able to return to Formula One during the 2011 season. On 16 February, it was announced that Nick Heidfeld was signed as Kubica's replacement, while Kubica still remained signed with the team for 2011.

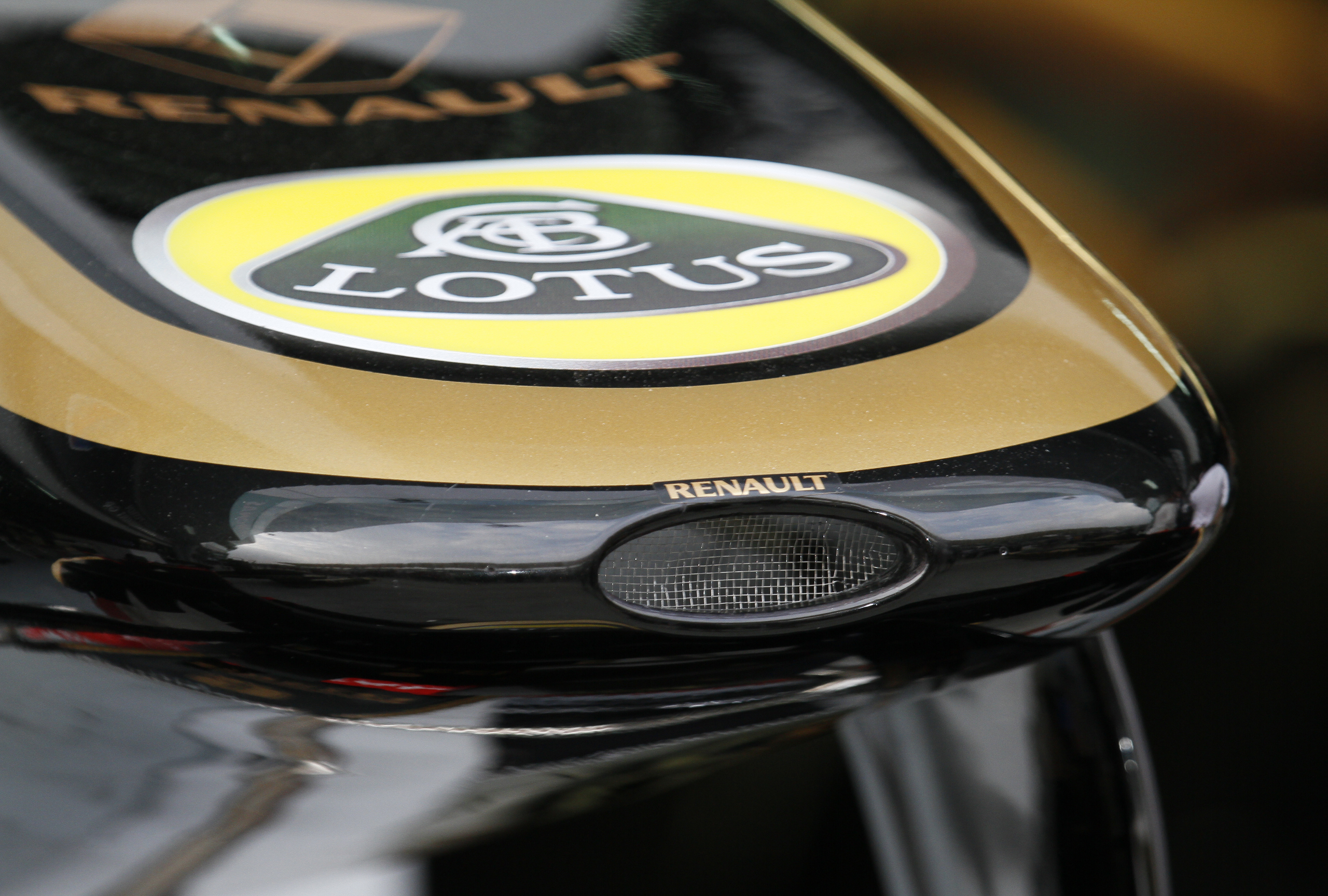
Despite 0% Renault ownership the team continued using the Renault name until the end of the 2011 season. The team also used a British licence.

At the Australian Grand Prix, Petrov took his first and only podium in Formula One, finishing third, and Heidfeld finished twelfth with a damaged car. Heidfeld finished third in the next race in Malaysia, while Petrov retired late on; he hit a bump caused by a drainage gully which launched his car into the air and broke the car's steering column on landing. In the Chinese Grand Prix, Petrov finished ninth having started tenth after a mechanical problem in qualifying, with Heidfeld finishing twelfth. Heidfeld and Petrov finished seventh and eighth in Turkey, as the team's early-season performance began to fade. Heidfeld finished ninth in Spain after missing qualifying due to a fire in practice, while Petrov finished just outside the points in eleventh place. Heidfeld scored more points in Monaco with eighth place, while Petrov retired after being caught up in an accident involving several other cars. Petrov finished fifth in the rain-affected Canadian Grand Prix, with Heidfeld retiring after damaging his car's front wing in a collision with Kamui Kobayashi. The team endured a difficult weekend in Valencia, as Heidfeld scored a single point for tenth place and Petrov finished 15th.

New restrictions over the use of off-throttle blown diffusers were introduced for the British Grand Prix, and the team was badly affected having designed their car around the system. Heidfeld managed 8th place in the race, with Petrov 12th. Heidfeld was replaced by Bruno Senna for the Belgian Grand Prix in August.

On 29 November 2011, the team confirmed that they had hired Kimi Räikkönen to drive full-time in 2012. On 9 December 2011, the team also confirmed that Romain Grosjean would join Räikkönen in 2012. During the 2012 season, the team would be known as the Lotus F1 Team.

=== Renault Sport Formula One Team and Renault F1 Team (2016–2020): The second Enstone era ===
==== 2016 season: Struggles in first season back ====
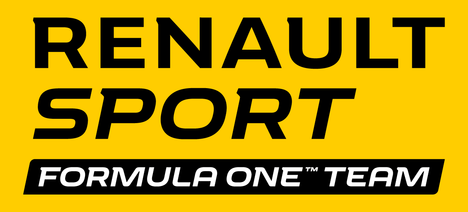
Renault Sport Formula One Team logo in 2016

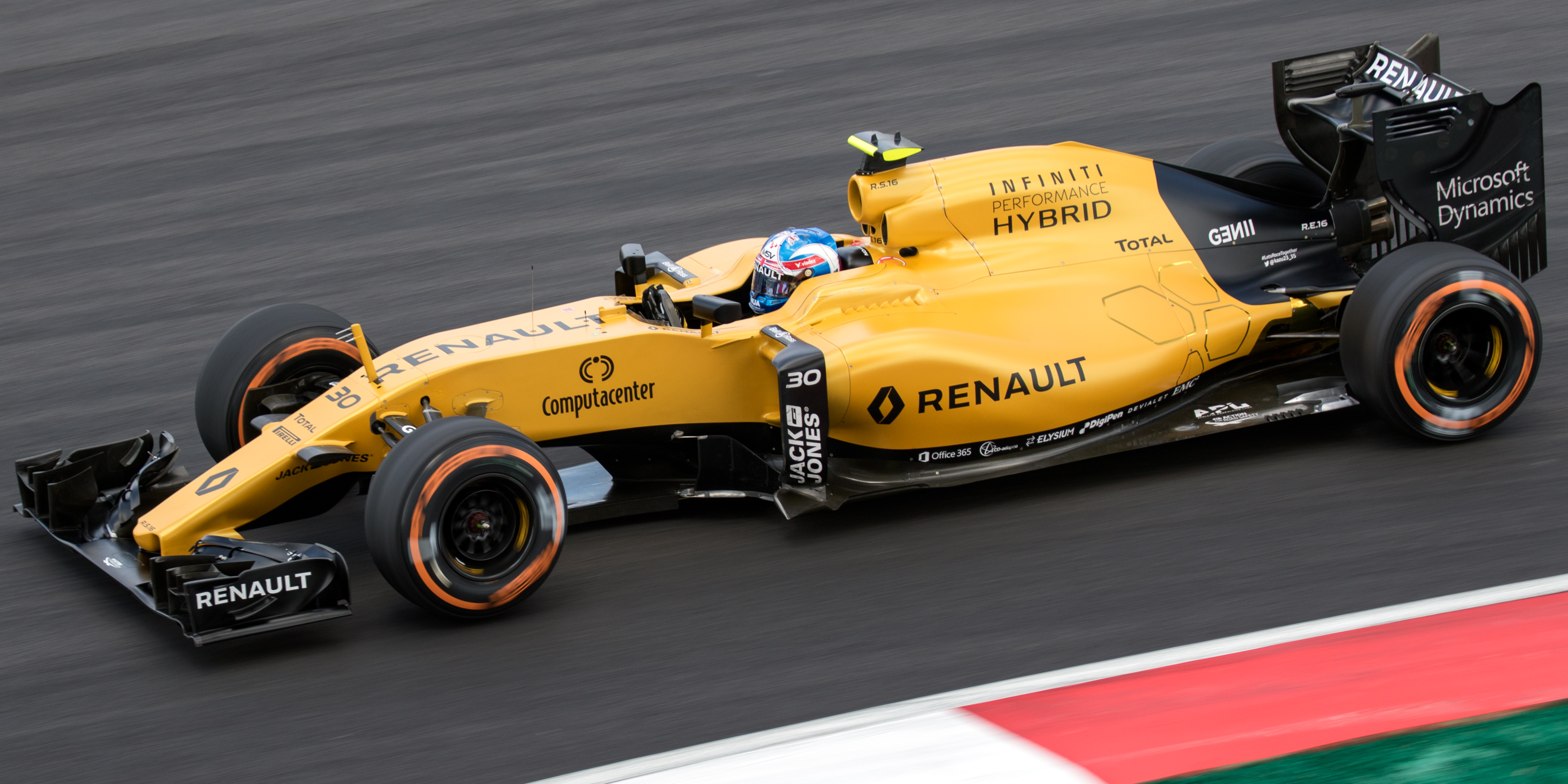
Jolyon Palmer driving for Renault at the 2016 Malaysian Grand Prix

On 28 September 2015, Renault Sport F1 announced that a letter of intent between Renault Group and Gravity Motorsports which is owned by Genii Capital had been signed and over the following weeks a takeover transaction would be discussed for the Lotus F1 Team (also known as Team Enstone which was previously owned by Renault until 2010) in hopes that the team would compete in the 2016 season as Renault Sport Formula One Team in response to the collapse of Renault's relationship with Red Bull. It was speculated that F1 veteran Alain Prost, who drove for Renault from 1981 to 1983, could take a senior role in the team.

On 3 December 2015, Renault announced that they had purchased the Lotus F1 Team and were preparing for the 2016 season with further information to be released in early 2016. As Renault returned to Formula One as a full-works constructor team, Red Bull Racing was officially demoted to Renault's customer team and thus received TAG Heuer rebadging sponsorship from 2016 to 2018 seasons.

On 3 February 2016, Renault unveiled the testing livery for their 2016 car, the Renault R.S.16, and confirmed Kevin Magnussen and Jolyon Palmer as its two race drivers, 2015 GP3 champion Esteban Ocon as its reserve driver, Carmen Jordá as its development driver, and that multiple drivers, including 2015 Formula Renault 3.5 champion Oliver Rowland, Jack Aitken, Louis Delétraz and Kevin Jörg are a part of its driver academy. Additionally, Bob Bell (formerly of Mercedes, Marussia and the previous incarnation of Renault) was confirmed as the team's chief technical officer and Frédéric Vasseur (of ART Grand Prix) as the new racing director. Renault Sport F1 is mainly partnered with the Renault-Nissan Alliance. However it also has other sponsorships with partners including Bell & Ross, Devialet, EMC, Genii Capital, Infiniti, Total, CD-adapco, Microsoft, Pirelli, OZ Racing and Jack & Jones.

The team finished the season in ninth place with 8 points.

==== 2017 season: Improved results ====
The Renault Sport Formula One Team logo (2017–2018)

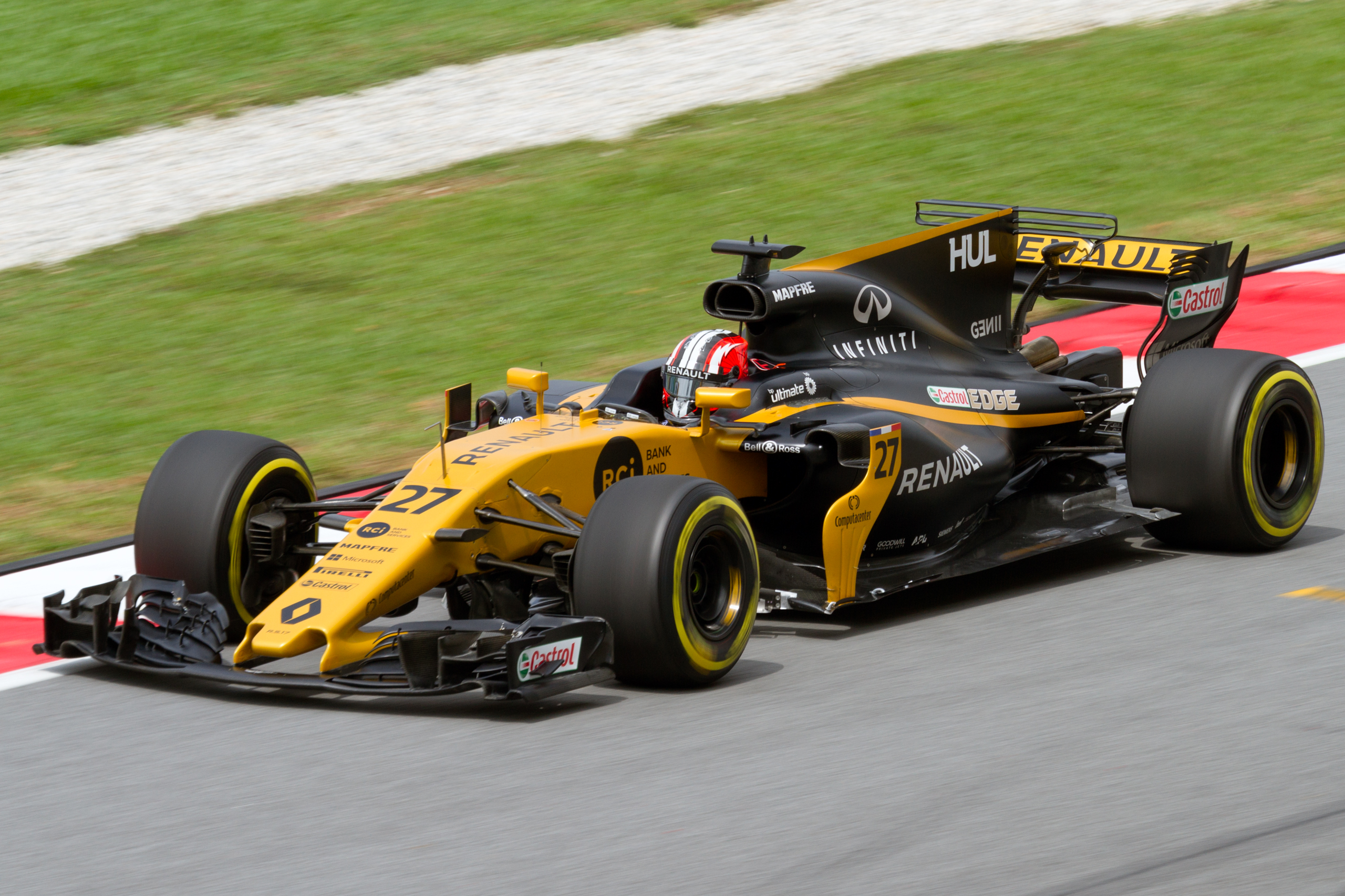
Nico Hülkenberg driving for Renault at the 2017 Malaysian Grand Prix

On 11 January 2017, Frédéric Vasseur left the team after disagreements with team personnel, therefore the team was managed by president Jérôme Stoll and managing director Cyril Abiteboul.

On 14 October 2016, it was announced that Nico Hülkenberg would join the team for the 2017 season. Kevin Magnussen later chose to leave the team to join Haas, with Jolyon Palmer remaining at the team for a second season, but was replaced by Carlos Sainz Jr. from the United States Grand Prix onwards, after only one point scoring finish. Sainz had a good debut at the United States Grand Prix, finishing seventh and out qualifying his teammate who retired from the race. The team finished the season in sixth place with 57 points.

==== 2018 season: Best result in the Constructors' Championship ====
Nico Hülkenberg continued to drive for Renault in 2018 as he had signed a multi-year deal the year before. After joining the team mid-season in 2017, Carlos Sainz Jr. continued to drive for them in 2018. They finished 4th in the championship with 122 points.

==== 2019 season: Ricciardo-era starts ====
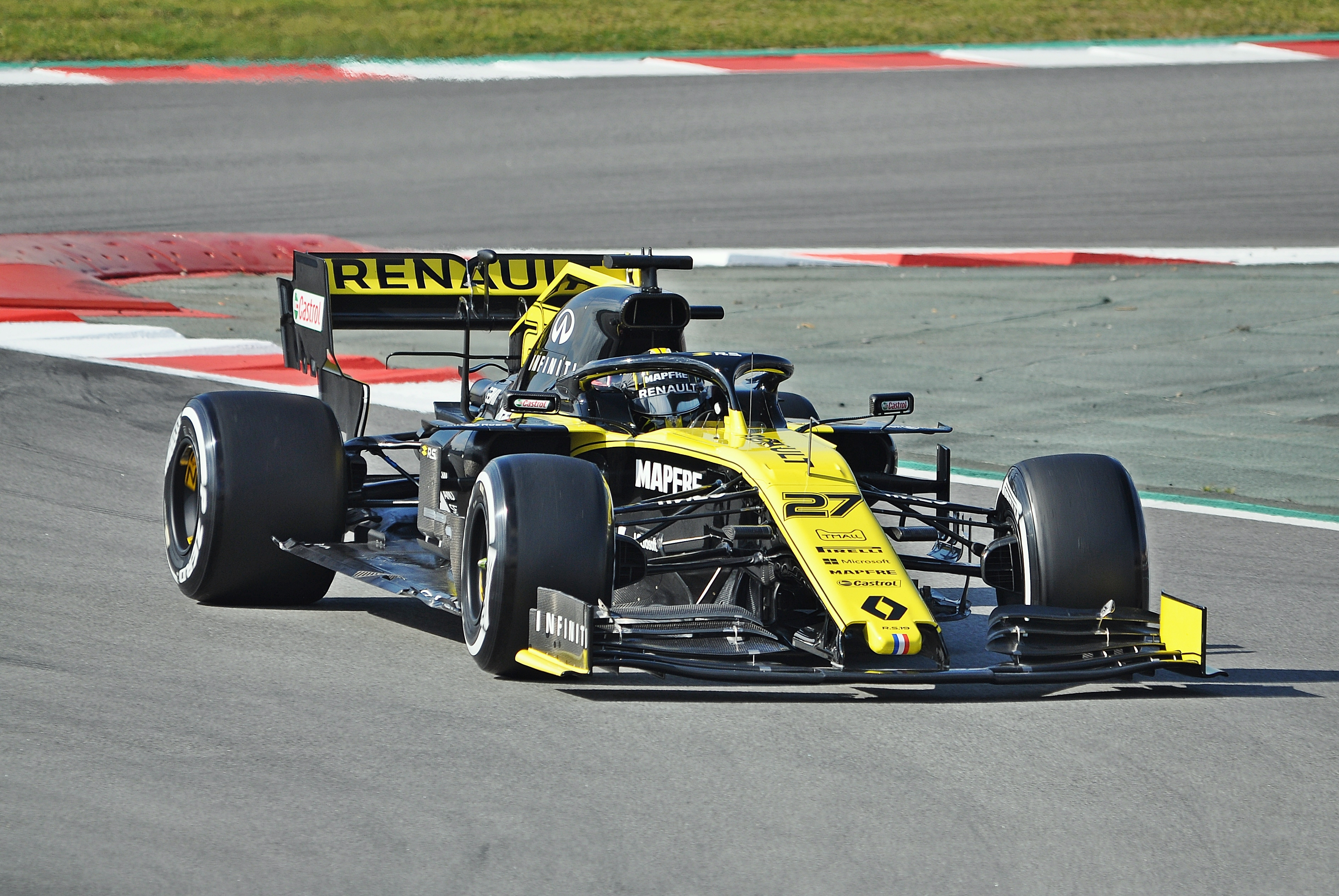
Nico Hülkenberg driving for Renault 2019

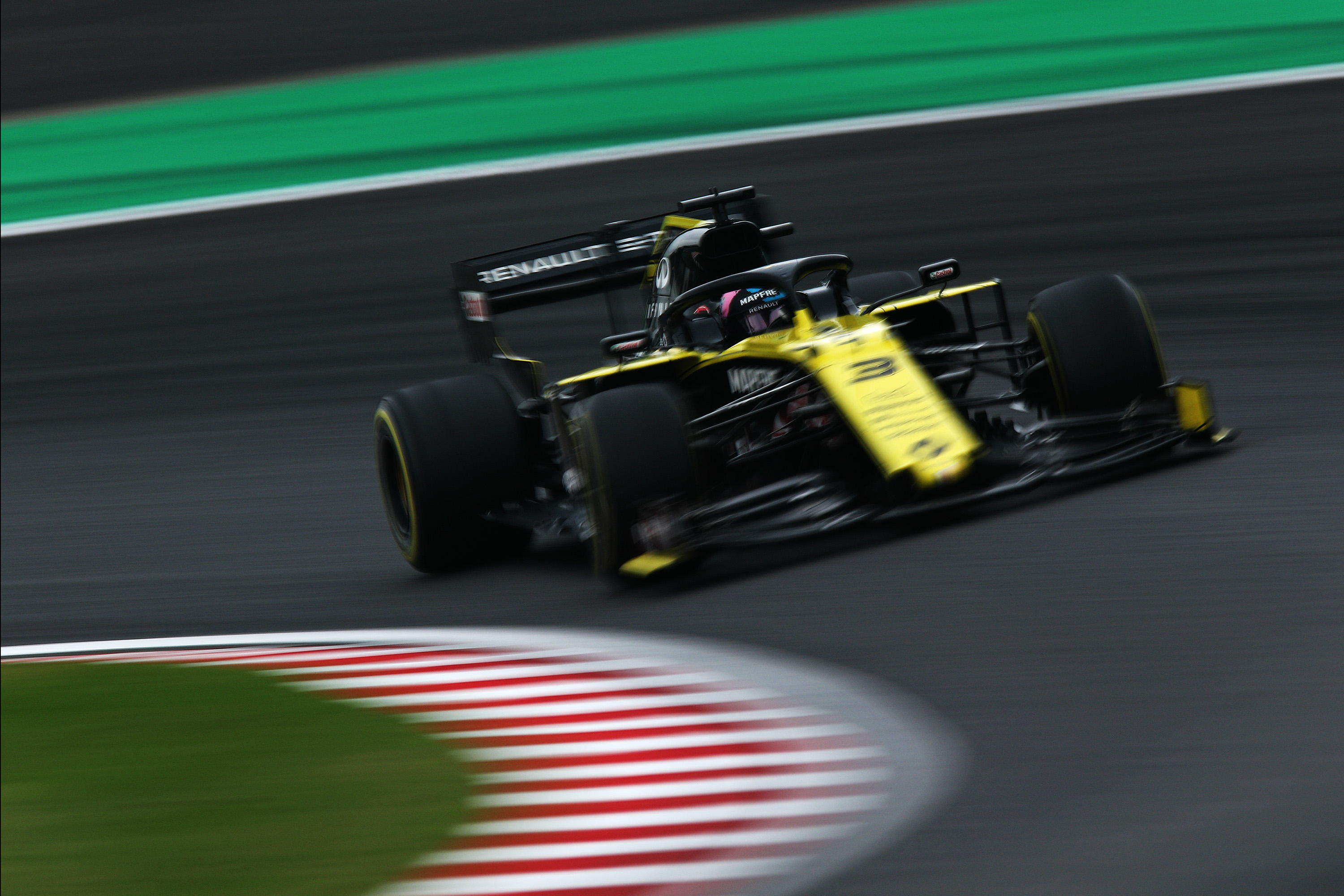
Daniel Ricciardo driving for Renault at the 2019 Japanese Grand Prix

On 3 August 2018, it was announced that Red Bull Racing driver Daniel Ricciardo would be joining the team on a two-year deal to partner Hülkenberg.

Plagued by reliability issues at the start of the season, and aerodynamic poor performance, the team finished 5th in the Constructors' Championship, failing to escape the midfield. Also of note was the 2019 Japanese Grand Prix, which the team was disqualified from as a result of their automatic brake balance changing system, which was deemed illegal.

At the end of the season, the team announced changes to the aerodynamic department of their team as a result of the R.S.19's failures. Chassis Technical Director Nick Chester would leave the team, with former Ferrari and McLaren chassis engineer Pat Fry and former Williams and Ferrari aerodynamicist Dirk de Beer to join the team.

==== 2020 season: Return to podium and final year of Renault F1 Team ====
Former Racing Point Force India driver and Mercedes reserve driver Esteban Ocon joined Renault for the 2020 season, on a multiple-year contract, replacing Nico Hülkenberg. The start of the 2020 season was postponed until July in response to the COVID-19 pandemic. In Belgium, Renault finished 4th and 5th, scoring 23 points in one single race, their most in any race ever as a constructor and their first fastest lap for a decade. At the Eifel Grand Prix raced on the Nürburgring circuit, Ricciardo scored a third-place finish with his R.S.20, the team's first podium since Malaysia 2011. Ricciardo also scored a third-place finish at the Emilia Romagna Grand Prix. Ocon also scored a second-place finish at the Sakhir Grand Prix, his first podium and Renault's third of the season. Ricciardo finished 5th in the World Drivers' Championship standings, while Ocon finished 12th. Renault finished 5th in the World Constructors' Championship standings with 181 points.

Renault was rebranded as Alpine for the 2021 season.

== Engine supplier (1983–2025) ==
=== Original turbo era (1983–1986) ===
Renault began manufacturing engines at the Viry-Châtillon factory in 1976, after closing the former Alpine competition department, which was run in conjunction with the Formula One team under the Renault Sport division. It manufactured the first turbocharged engine seen on the category, the Renault-Gordini EF1 1.5 litres V6, at a time when the naturally aspirated 3-litre engines were predominant. Initially only supplying engines to the works team, Renault began a customer programme in 1983 when it became Team Lotus' engine supplier. Mecachrome, a precision engineering company, prepared the engines for the customer teams.

Though not competitive initially, with the recruitment of designer Gérard Ducarouge the marque gained competitiveness towards the later part of the 1983 season into 1984, with Nigel Mansell and Elio de Angelis scoring regular podiums. That year, Renault also began supplying engines to the Ligier team, which scored three points in 1984, an improvement over not being classified in the 1983 championship. Ayrton Senna joined Team Lotus in 1985 and the combination of his talent and the fast, but fuel-inefficient Lotus 97T gained eight pole positions and three wins (two to Senna, one to de Angelis), but unreliability prevented a sustained attempt at either title. The Tyrrell team started using the Renault engine from the seventh Grand Prix of the year, while Ligier gained three podiums in the Ligier JS25. In 1986, aristocrat Johnny Dumfries was chosen to be Senna's new partner at Lotus after Senna vetoed the original choice of Derek Warwick. More pole positions and two wins for the Brazilian followed with the Lotus 98T, but the car followed similar problems as its predecessor with reliability problems and poor fuel consumption. This saw to it that Lotus could not sustain a season-long challenge to leading teams McLaren and Williams.

After the 1985 season, the Renault works team ended participation in Formula One but continued as an engine supplier for Ligier, Tyrrell and Lotus. 1986 saw the introduction of the EF15B engine, which included several innovations, like static ignition and pneumatic valve return. Renault Sport stopped its engine program at the end of the year, having scored 19 pole positions and 5 Grand Prix victories with customer teams.

=== Return to naturally aspirated engines (1989–2013) ===
==== Success with Williams and Benetton (1989–1997) ====
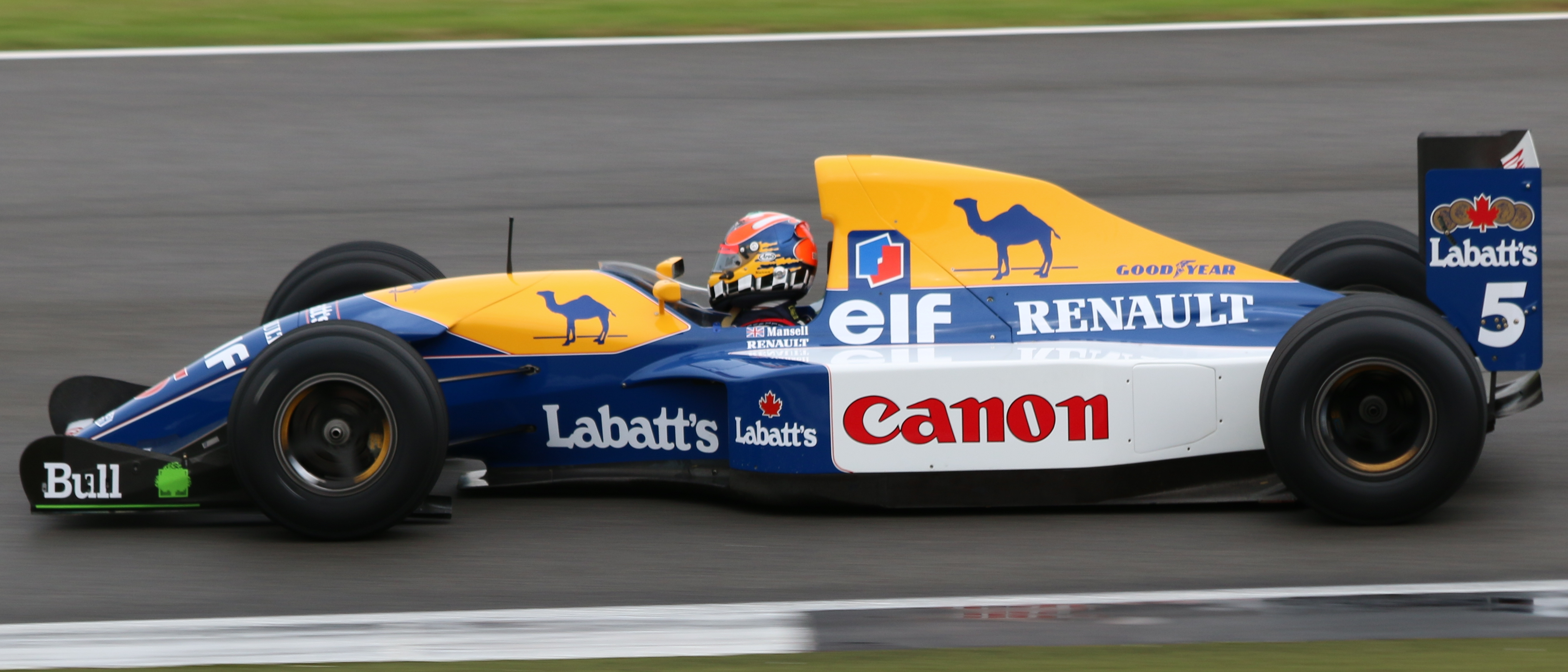
Renault secured its first titles in 1992 with the Williams-Renault FW14B.

Renault returned as a Formula One engine supplier in 1989 with the banning of turbocharged engines, in partnership with the Williams team. The Viry factory produced the first pneumatic valved 3.5 V10 engine, the RS1, while other engine manufacturers supplied V8 (Ford, Judd and Yamaha), V10 (Honda), or V12 (Ferrari and Lamborghini) engines. The Williams-Renault combination scored its first victory at the wet 1989 Canadian Grand Prix, with Thierry Boutsen, and finished their initial season together with Boutsen winning the very wet 1989 Australian Grand Prix.

Williams had signs of promise for the next two years and by 1992, with the aid of active suspension and better engines, the Williams-Renault was a World Championship-winning car, winning over half of the races during the season, as its driver Nigel Mansell won the drivers' title. Former customer team Ligier also resumed using the same works Renault engines as Williams in 1992. The championship was won again by Williams in 1993, using the technologically advanced Williams FW15C car – the team had developed technology such as anti-lock brakes, traction control and power steering, along with using the RS5 engine with a redesigned intake and combustion. Alain Prost won the Drivers' Championship after winning 7 of the 16 rounds, and his teammate Damon Hill won another three Grands Prix.

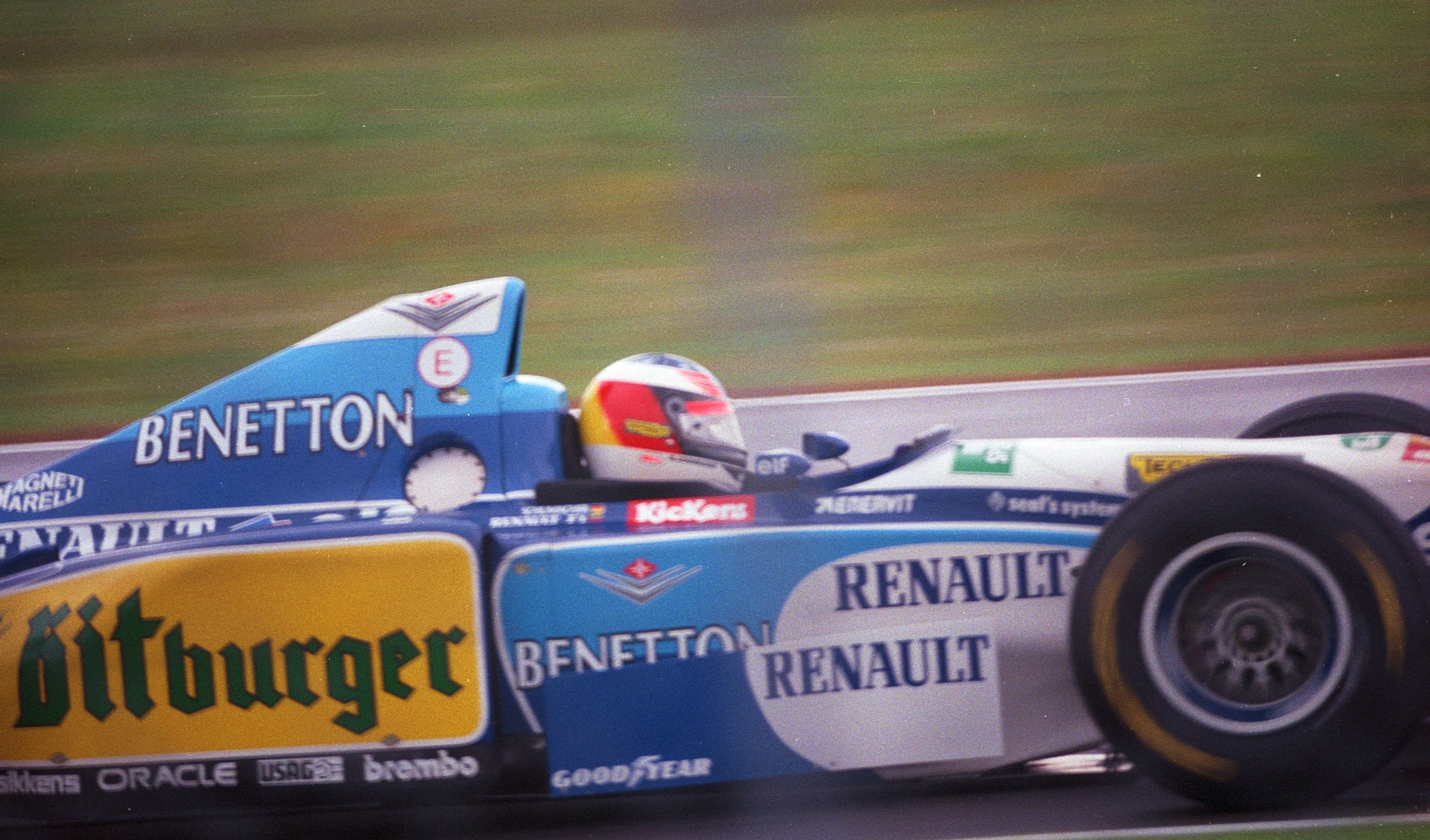
Michael Schumacher driving a Benetton-Renault B195 at the 1995 British Grand Prix

1994 saw Williams driver Ayrton Senna killed at the 1994 San Marino Grand Prix, which left the Brazilian's inexperienced teammate Damon Hill as team leader. Hill was 37 points behind Championship leader Michael Schumacher by the French Grand Prix, but had managed to close the gap down to 1 point before the last race in Adelaide. The two drivers collided controversially and retired from the race, making Schumacher the Drivers' Champion while Williams retained the Constructors' Championship.

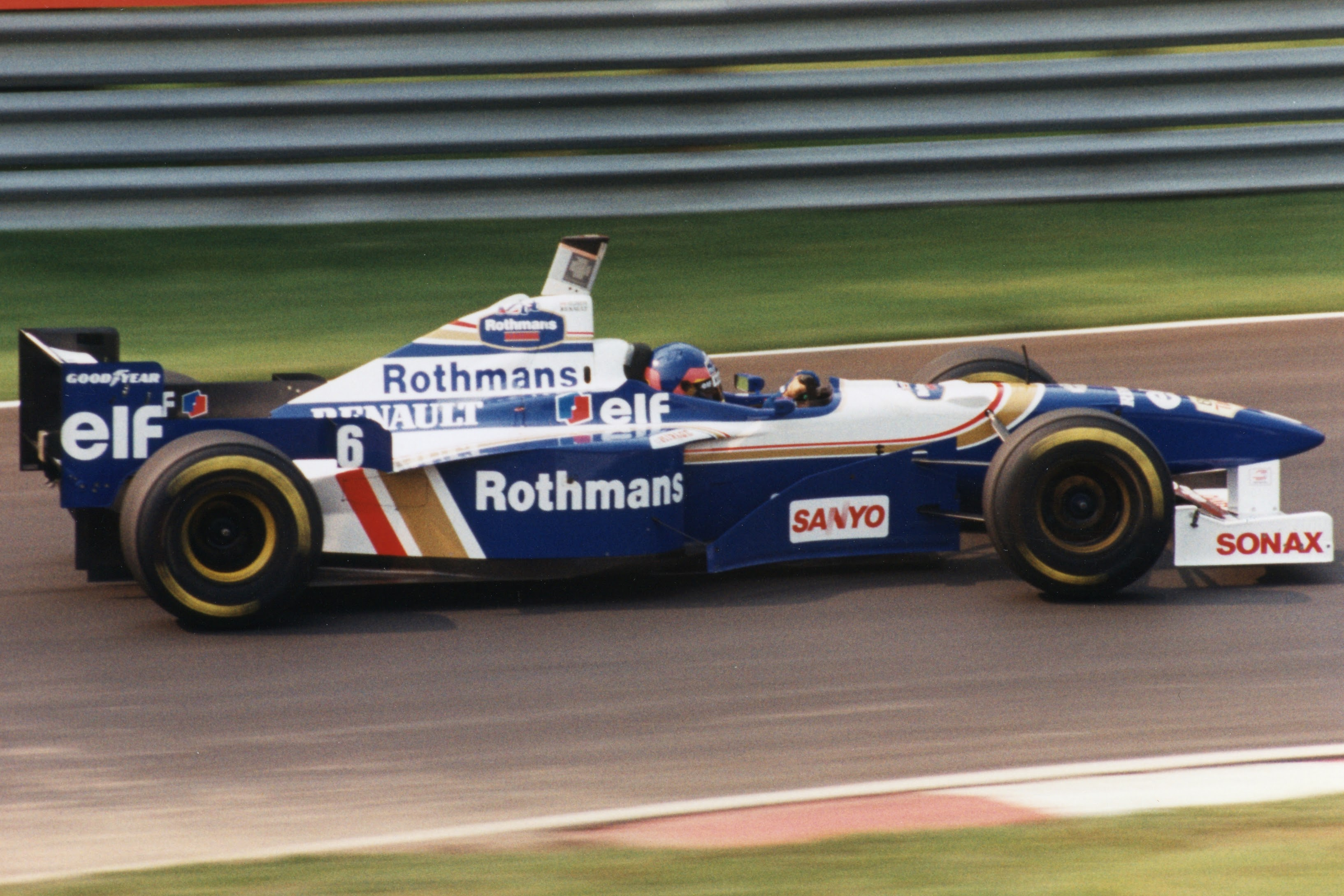
Jacques Villeneuve's Williams-Renault in 1996. He would win the 1997 title using a Renault-powered car.

In 1995 engine regulations reduced maximum engine displacement to three litres, with Renault adapting the RS7, making it lighter and featuring a fly-by-wire throttle. Benetton acquired Ligier's Renault engines for 1995 and their driver, Michael Schumacher, managed to successfully defend his drivers' title by 33 points from his nearest rival, Damon Hill. Benetton won the constructors' title by 29 points, winning 11 races during the season. Williams won both the drivers' and constructors' titles in each of the next two seasons, with Damon Hill winning the title in 1996 and Jacques Villeneuve in 1997. Schumacher and other Benetton staff left for Ferrari in 1996, and the team finished in third position for both years scoring just two pole positions and one victory across 1996 and 1997 with Gerhard Berger scoring pole and victory at 1997 German Grand Prix with his team mate Jean Alesi taking pole at the 1997 Italian Grand Prix.

==== Initial end of factory Renault engines, Mecachrome and Supertec (1998–2000) ====
Renault left F1 again at the end of 1997, and evolutions of its last engine, the RS9, were still used by many teams during the following seasons. Renault continued working with Mecachrome, which paid for development of the engines, and supplied them to Williams under the Mecachrome name. Benetton continued to use the engines under the Playlife brand until 2000, although only achieved several podiums during this time. Flavio Briatore's company Supertec distributed the engines from 1999, with Williams and BAR using them under the Supertec name that year, and the Arrows cars using them in 2000, while Benetton used them under the Playlife name in 1999 and 2000. Although on a few occasions points were scored, ultimately the engines were not successful under Supertec's control, subsequently all but one team moved to another supplier after one season.

==== Return to supply with Red Bull Racing yields title success (2007–2013) ====
After Renault purchased the Benetton team, they did not supply customer engines until 2007, when they signed an agreement with Red Bull Racing on 15 September 2006. Red Bull were a midfield team during the first two years of the partnership, before a change in regulations for the 2009 season allowed Red Bull to claim their first victory at the Chinese Grand Prix. Drivers Sebastian Vettel and Mark Webber took five further victories that year to allow the team to finish second in the Constructors' Championship. In 2010, Vettel and Red Bull won both championships, making it the ninth title for a Renault engine, and the first for the RS27.

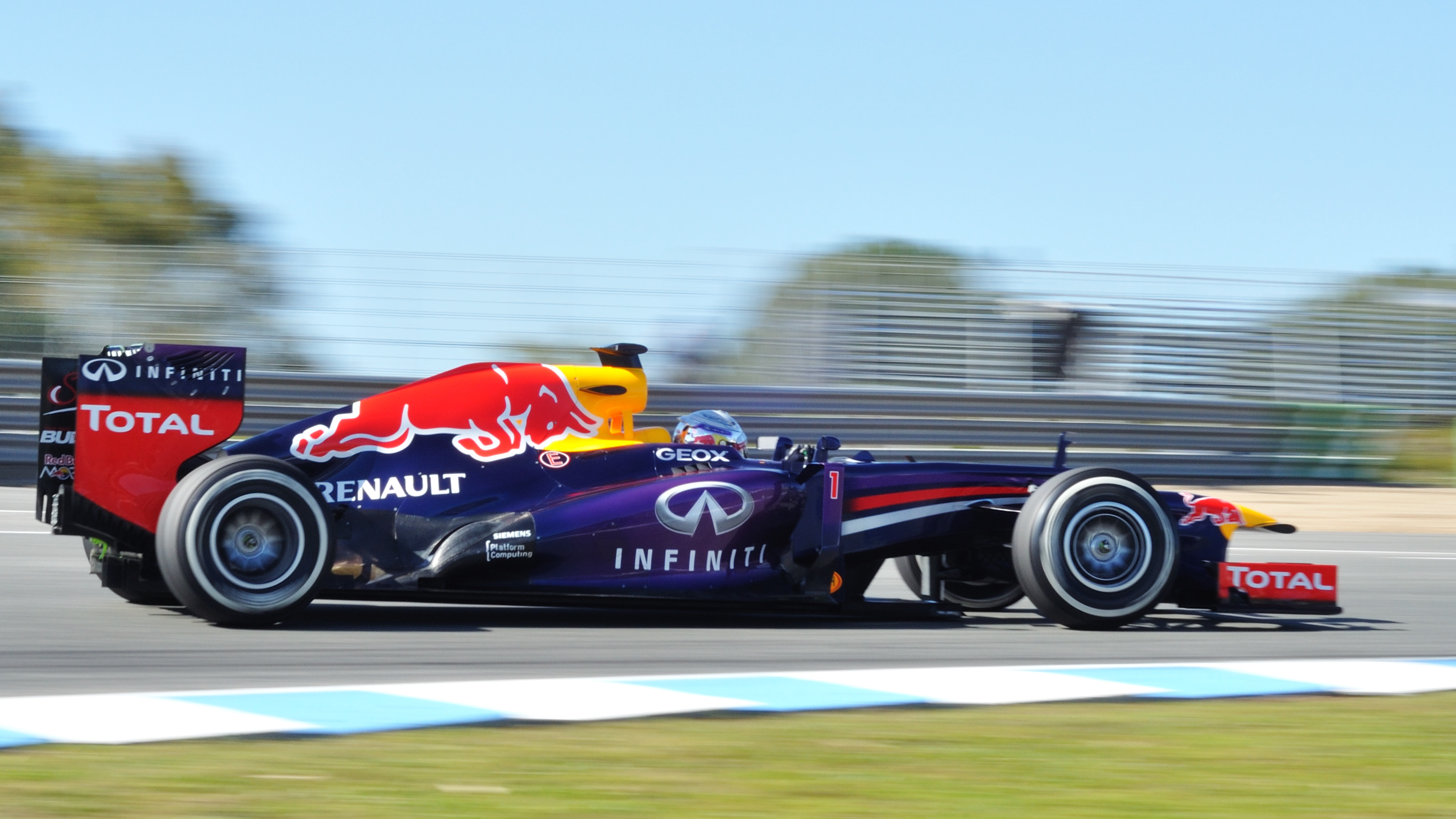
In 2013, Sebastian Vettel won his fourth title in the Renault-powered Red Bull RB9.

The logo used by Renault Sport F1, the official supplier of Renault Formula One engines, between 2011 and 2015

At the end of 2010, when Renault sold their remaining stake in the Enstone-based Formula One team, the engine operations at Viry-Châtillon were formed into a subsidiary known as Renault Sport F1. Renault Sport F1 continued to supply engines to their former works team and Red Bull, and expanded their customers to Lotus Racing at the end of 2010. As a result of Renault selling its shares in the Enstone team, Red Bull Racing was officially promoted to Renault's works team and thus received free engines from Renault with help from Infiniti sponsorship. Red Bull again won both titles in 2011, the Red Bull RB7 being unmatched by their opponents, and gained 18 pole positions throughout the season. Vettel held the championship lead from the first race in Australia, and finished in first or second position in each Grand Prix until his home race at Germany, where he ended in fourth. He then resumed his podium run, with the exception of one retirement, until the end of the season, while Webber finished behind until the final two races. In 2012, the Red Bull team and Sebastian Vettel were able to achieve both championships for a third time, despite the fact the RB8 car did not enjoy the dominance of the previous season and suffered some reliability problems related to the RS27's alternator. That year, Williams returned to its association with Renault, signing a deal to receive the RS27 engines until the end of 2013. Red Bull came back to a dominant pace in the 2013 season and both the team and Sebastian Vettel secured their fourth consecutive title at the 2013 Indian Grand Prix, and closed out the year with nine consecutive victories.

=== Struggles in the V6 turbo-hybrid era and the end of engine supply (2014–2025) ===
Renault developed a new 1.6-litre V6 turbocharged engine, the Renault Energy F1-2014, in line with the new regulations for 2014 with APC Pankl Turbosystems GmbH supplying hybrid turbocharger kits for Renault Formula One engines from 2014 until 2020 and BorgWarner supplying them from 2021 onwards. On 21 June 2013, Renault unveiled its new engine at the Paris Air Show. It was named Energy F1 after the Renault's road car engines. Red Bull and Caterham (formerly Lotus Racing/Team Lotus) had deals to use Renault engines until 2016. At the 2013 Monaco Grand Prix, Scuderia Toro Rosso announced a customer engine supply contract with Renault for the original period 2014–2016.

During the early 2014 tests in Jerez the new Renault engines showed problems with both the turbo unit and the energy recovery systems. Partial fixes were introduced for the last pre-season tests in Bahrain, especially software upgrades. In the early part of the season, the Energy F1-2014 was the subject of various criticisms for its poor reliability and lack of top speed, including one by Red Bull's boss Christian Horner which described the performance as "unacceptable" after an unsuccessful team's home race in Austria. Renault introduced revised components and more software upgrades trying to reduce the gap with rivals.

In 2015, Red Bull unilaterally terminated their contract for 2016 with Renault, alleging a lack of performance from the Renault Energy F1-2015 compared to rivals. However, they later renegotiated their agreement, as plans from Red Bull to get a more competitive power unit failed. In 2016, the Renault power units used by Red Bull would be badged as TAG Heuer. Renault then terminated their 2016 engine supply agreement with Scuderia Toro Rosso, and the team returned to their former supplier Ferrari. During 2016, Red Bull GmbH renewed their contract for a further two years for Red Bull Racing. They also announced that Scuderia Toro Rosso would also return to Renault power from 2017. However, the contract still gave Red Bull the option to badge their engines as they wish, with Christian Horner stating that Red Bull Racing would continue with the TAG Heuer badging without Renault works support.

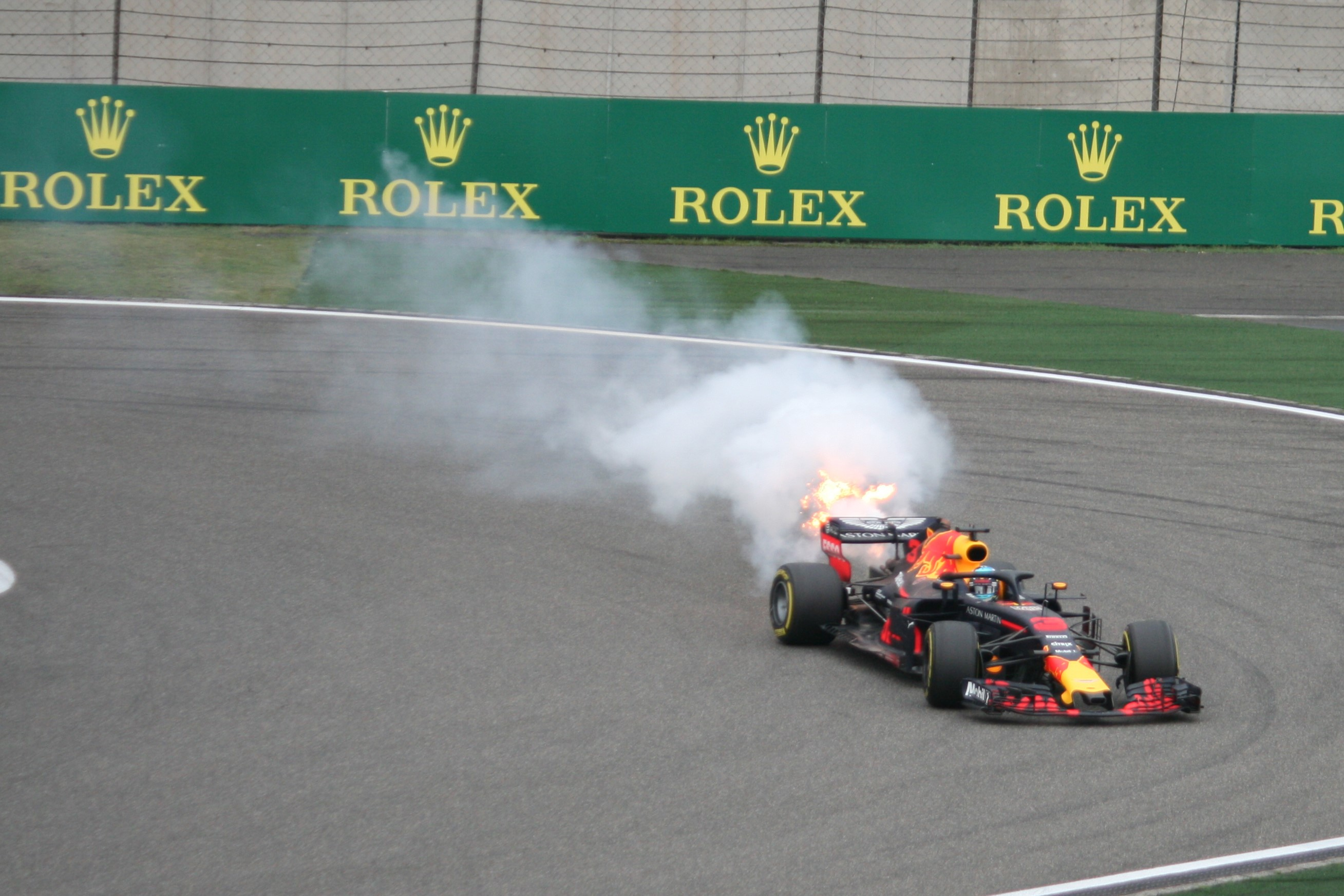
Renault struggled with reliability throughout the hybrid era.

In September 2017, Renault and McLaren announced the latter would use customer Renault engines from 2018 to 2020 in order to aid the competitiveness of the Renault works team. Toro Rosso in turn switched to full-works Honda engines, terminating their 2018 customer deal with Renault. In June 2018, Red Bull announced they would also use full-works Honda engines from 2019 onwards. As McLaren ended its Renault customer partnership due to switching to Mercedes power units from 2021 season, Renault returned to single-team engine supply for the first time since the 2006 season. This remained the case until Renault ceased its engine development and supply at the end of the 2025 season.

The Enstone-based team was rebranded to Alpine from the 2021 season onwards while Renault was retained as the engine make, marking the first time since 2015 that the Renault brand would be in Formula One solely as an engine supplier. However, despite the rebranding of the Enstone team and a win for Alpine driver Esteban Ocon at the 2021 Hungarian Grand Prix, the Renault power unit still continued to struggle overall relative to the competition from Honda, Ferrari and Mercedes. During 2023, Alpine – whose A523 car was on average 0.9 seconds slower than the pacesetting Honda-powered Red Bull RB19 – claimed their car had been cost half a second of performance versus its competitors purely because of the lacklustre Renault power unit. With a power unit more on par with its rivals, Alpine claimed the A523 would have been in performance terms about on par with the Mercedes W14.

Due to the lack of success and unreliability of their engines since the beginning of the V6 turbo-hybrid era in 2014, on 29 September 2024, Renault announced that it would be ending its works engine programme and would therefore cease to provide engines for Alpine after 2025, when revised engine regulations are set to be introduced in 2026. Groupe Renault CEO Luca de Meo has stated financial reasons as the main reason behind ending the programme, claiming that it would be cheaper to purchase a power unit from another manufacturer than continue to develop one in-house. Said manufacturer would be revealed by Alpine to be Mercedes, becoming a customer team by utilising their engines and gearboxes from the 2026 season onward.

Following the 2025 Japanese Grand Prix, held at the Suzuka Circuit, an article by journalist Scott Mitchell-Malm for motorsport website The Race revealed that during qualifying for that event, Alpine and their Renault power units were particularly slow in the second sector of the lap on that track, which contains two long straights without DRS zones; the Alpines lost 0.6 seconds in that sector, further emphasising Renault's horsepower issues in the hybrid era with Mitchell-Malm saying such data vindicated Renault's decision to end its engine supply and development at end of 2025.

== Renault/Alpine Academy ==
As part of the company's return to Formula One, it set up a young driver academy, tasked with finding future Formula 1 World Champions. The academy was rebranded as Alpine Academy following the rebranding of Renault F1 Team to Alpine F1 Team in 2021.

== Formula One results ==
=== As a chassis constructor ===
As a constructor, Renault have achieved the following statistics:

- Constructors' Championships winning percentage: 8%
- Drivers' Championships winning percentage: 8%
- Winning percentage: 8.7%

Formula One results
(**Bold** indicates championships won.)
Year	Name	Car	Engine	Tyres	No.	Drivers	Points	WCC
1977	(France) Équipe Renault Elf	RS01	EF1 1.5 V6 t	M	15.	(France) Jean-Pierre Jabouille	0	NC
1978	(France) Équipe Renault Elf	RS01	EF1 1.5 V6 t	M	15.	(France) Jean-Pierre Jabouille	3	12th
1979	(France) Équipe Renault Elf	RS01; RS10	EF1 1.5 V6 t	M	15. 16.	(France) Jean-Pierre Jabouille (France) René Arnoux	26	6th
1980	(France) Équipe Renault Elf	RE20	EF1 1.5 V6 t	M	15. 16.	(France) Jean-Pierre Jabouille (France) René Arnoux	38	4th
1981	(France) Équipe Renault Elf	RE20B; RE30	EF1 1.5 V6 t	M	15. 16.	(France) Alain Prost (France) René Arnoux	54	3rd
1982	(France) Équipe Renault Elf	RE30B	EF1 1.5 V6 t	M	15. 16.	(France) Alain Prost (France) René Arnoux	62	3rd
1983	(France) Équipe Renault Elf	RE30C; RE40	EF1 1.5 V6 t	M	15. 16.	(France) Alain Prost (United States) Eddie Cheever	79	2nd
1984	(France) Équipe Renault Elf	RE50	EF4 1.5 V6 t	M	15. 16. 33.	(France) Patrick Tambay (United Kingdom) Derek Warwick (France) Philippe Streiff	34	5th
1985	(France) Équipe Renault Elf	RE60; RE60B	EF4B 1.5 V6 t EF15 1.5 V6 t	G	14. 15. 16.	(France) François Hesnault (France) Patrick Tambay (United Kingdom) Derek Warwick	16	7th
1986–2001: Renault did not compete as a constructor
2002	(France) Mild Seven Renault F1 Team	R202	RS22 3.0 V10	M	14. 15.	(Italy) Jarno Trulli (United Kingdom) Jenson Button	23	4th
2003	(France) Mild Seven Renault F1 Team	R23; R23B	RS23 3.0 V10	M	7. 8.	(Italy) Jarno Trulli (Spain) Fernando Alonso	88	4th
2004	(France) Mild Seven Renault F1 Team	R24	RS24 3.0 V10	M	7. 7. 8.	(Italy) Jarno Trulli (Canada) Jacques Villeneuve (Spain) Fernando Alonso	105	3rd
2005	(France) Mild Seven Renault F1 Team	R25	RS25 3.0 V10	M	5. 6.	(Spain) **Fernando Alonso** (Italy) Giancarlo Fisichella	**191**	**1st**
2006	(France) Mild Seven Renault F1 Team	R26	RS26 2.4 V8	M	1. 2.	(Spain) **Fernando Alonso** (Italy) Giancarlo Fisichella	**206**	**1st**
2007	(France) ING Renault F1 Team	R27	RS27 2.4 V8	B	3. 4.	(Italy) Giancarlo Fisichella (Finland) Heikki Kovalainen	51	3rd
2008	(France) ING Renault F1 Team	R28	RS27 2.4 V8	B	5. 6.	(Spain) Fernando Alonso (Brazil) Nelson Piquet Jr.	80	4th
2009	(France) ING Renault F1 Team (France) Renault F1 Team (Note: ING Group pulled its title sponsorship mid-season due to the "crashgate" controversy.)	R29	RS27 2.4 V8	B	7. 8. 8.	(Spain) Fernando Alonso (Brazil) Nelson Piquet Jr. (France) Romain Grosjean	26	8th
2010	(France) Renault F1 Team	R30	RS27-2010 2.4 V8	B	11. 12.	(Poland) Robert Kubica (Russia) Vitaly Petrov	163	5th
2011	(United Kingdom) Lotus Renault GP	R31	RS27-2011 2.4 V8	P	9. 9. 10.	(Germany) Nick Heidfeld (Brazil) Bruno Senna (Russia) Vitaly Petrov	73	5th
2012–2015: Renault did not compete as a constructor
2016	(France) Renault Sport F1 Team	R.S.16	R.E.16 1.6 V6 t	P	20. 30.	(Denmark) Kevin Magnussen (United Kingdom) Jolyon Palmer	8	9th
2017	(France) Renault Sport F1 Team	R.S.17	R.E.17 1.6 V6 t	P	27. 30. 55.	(Germany) Nico Hülkenberg (United Kingdom) Jolyon Palmer (Spain) Carlos Sainz Jr.	57	6th
2018	(France) Renault Sport F1 Team	R.S.18	R.E.18 1.6 V6 t	P	27. 55.	(Germany) Nico Hülkenberg (Spain) Carlos Sainz Jr.	122	4th
2019	(France) Renault F1 Team	R.S.19	E-Tech 19 1.6 V6 t	P	3. 27.	(Australia) Daniel Ricciardo (Germany) Nico Hülkenberg	91	5th
2020	(France) Renault DP World F1 Team	R.S.20	E-Tech 20 1.6 V6 t	P	3. 31.	(Australia) Daniel Ricciardo (France) Esteban Ocon	181	5th

=== As an engine supplier (excludes factory team under Renault name) ===
Constructor	Season(s)	Total wins	First win	Last win	Pole positions	First pole	Last pole
(United Kingdom) Lotus	1983–1986	5	1985 Portuguese Grand Prix	1986 Detroit Grand Prix	19	1983 European Grand Prix	1986 Mexican Grand Prix
(France) Ligier	1984–1986, 1992–1994	0	–	–	0	–	–
(United Kingdom) Tyrrell	1985–1986	0	–	–	0	–	–
(United Kingdom) Williams	1989–1997, 2012–2013	64	1989 Canadian Grand Prix	2012 Spanish Grand Prix	80	1989 Hungarian Grand Prix	2012 Spanish Grand Prix
(United Kingdom) / (Italy) Benetton	1995–1997, 2001	12	1995 Brazilian Grand Prix	1997 German Grand Prix	6	1995 San Marino Grand Prix	1997 Italian Grand Prix
(Austria) Red Bull	2007–2015	50	2009 Chinese Grand Prix	2014 Belgian Grand Prix	53	2009 Chinese Grand Prix	2013 Brazilian Grand Prix
(Malaysia) Lotus	2011	0	–	–	0	–	–
(United Kingdom) Lotus	2012–2014	2	2012 Abu Dhabi Grand Prix	2013 Australian Grand Prix	0	–	–
(Malaysia) Caterham	2012–2014	0	–	–	0	–	–
(Italy) Toro Rosso	2014–2015	0	–	–	0	–	–
(United Kingdom) McLaren	2018–2020	0	–	–	0	–	–
(France) Alpine	2021–2025	1	2021 Hungarian Grand Prix	2021 Hungarian Grand Prix	0	–	–
Total	1983–2025	134	1985 Portuguese Grand Prix	2021 Hungarian Grand Prix	158	1983 European Grand Prix	2013 Brazilian Grand Prix

== Footnotes ==
Achievements
Preceded by Ferrari	Formula One Constructors' Champion; 2005–2006	Succeeded by Ferrari
Awards
Preceded by Greece national football team	Laureus World Team of the Year; 2006	Succeeded by Italy national football team
