= Alain Dassas =

French businessman

- Born: 5 August 1946 (age 80); Paris, France
- Education: ESCP; University of Paris (PhD in Econometrics); Stanford University (MSM)
- Occupations: Member of the board of directors, Head of European Operations (SI Capital Partners); CFO (Segula Technologies); Permanent Representative for APG (ABP Fund) as an Independent Member of the Supervisory Board of Altarea SCA

Alain Dassas (French pronunciation: [alɛ̃ dɑsɑ]) (born 5 August 1946) is a French businessman who held various positions within the Renault-Nissan Alliance and was one of the key participants in the agreements that led to its creation. He also negotiated several major contracts for the Renault F1 Team and was President of it between 2006 and 2007.

== Early career and education ==
Dassas was born on 5 August 1946 in Paris, France. After obtaining a degree at the École Supérieure de Commerce de Paris, a postgraduate degree in econometrics at the University of Paris and a Masters in Management at Stanford University, he was hired by the Chase Manhattan Bank in New York in 1973 and since then, he occupied various senior positions at different financial entities in both France and the United States.

== Renault-Nissan alliance ==
=== Renault ===
In 1983, Renault hired Dassas to manage the company's financial offices in New York. In 1986, he was named chief operating officer of the Société Financière et Foncière (Renault's bank). He also was assigned to manage relationships with banks and financial markets. In 1990, he became Financial Director of Renault Crédit International. In 1997 he was named vice president, Financial Operations of Renault and participated in several key agreements for the future of the company, such as negotiations with Volvo, the joint venture with AvtoVAZ, the acquisition of a majority stake in Dacia and Renault Samsung Motors and the alliance with Nissan. In 2001, he was named Senior Vicepresident, Finance and in 2003 he joined the board of directors of Renault.

In 2010, he became a company's consultant.

==== Renault F1 ====
Dassas played a major role during the purchase of Benetton Formula by Renault in 2000, which then would be called Renault F1 Team . Later, he was involved in financial negotiations with Bernard Ecclestone.

On 3 April 2006, Dassas replaced Patrick Faure as President of the team. During his first year Renault was one of the dominant forces in Formula One and won the constructors' and drivers' championships. In 2007, however, performance dropped significantly and on 4 September of that year Dassas left his charge and was replaced by Bernard Rey.

=== Nissan ===
In 1999, Dassas was a member of the board of directors of Nissan Diesel.

On 4 September 2007, it was announced his transfer to Nissan as chief financial officer (CFO), a position which became effective on 17 September. The objectives of this measure were to fill a position that had been vacant four years (since Thierry Moulonguet's departure) and improving relations with the world of finance, because the price of the shares of Nissan had been steadily dropping.

On 5 October 2009, the Yokohama based automaker announced that on 1 December Dassas would leave his post, returning to France.

== Beyond Renault-Nissan alliance ==
As of 2010, Dassas is CFO of Segula Technologies. He is also a member of the investment company Strategic Initiatives' board of directors, and its Head of European Operations.

He is a permanent representative for APG (ABP Fund) as an independent member of the supervisory board of Altarea SCA.
