= Lotus E20 =

2012 Formula One racing car

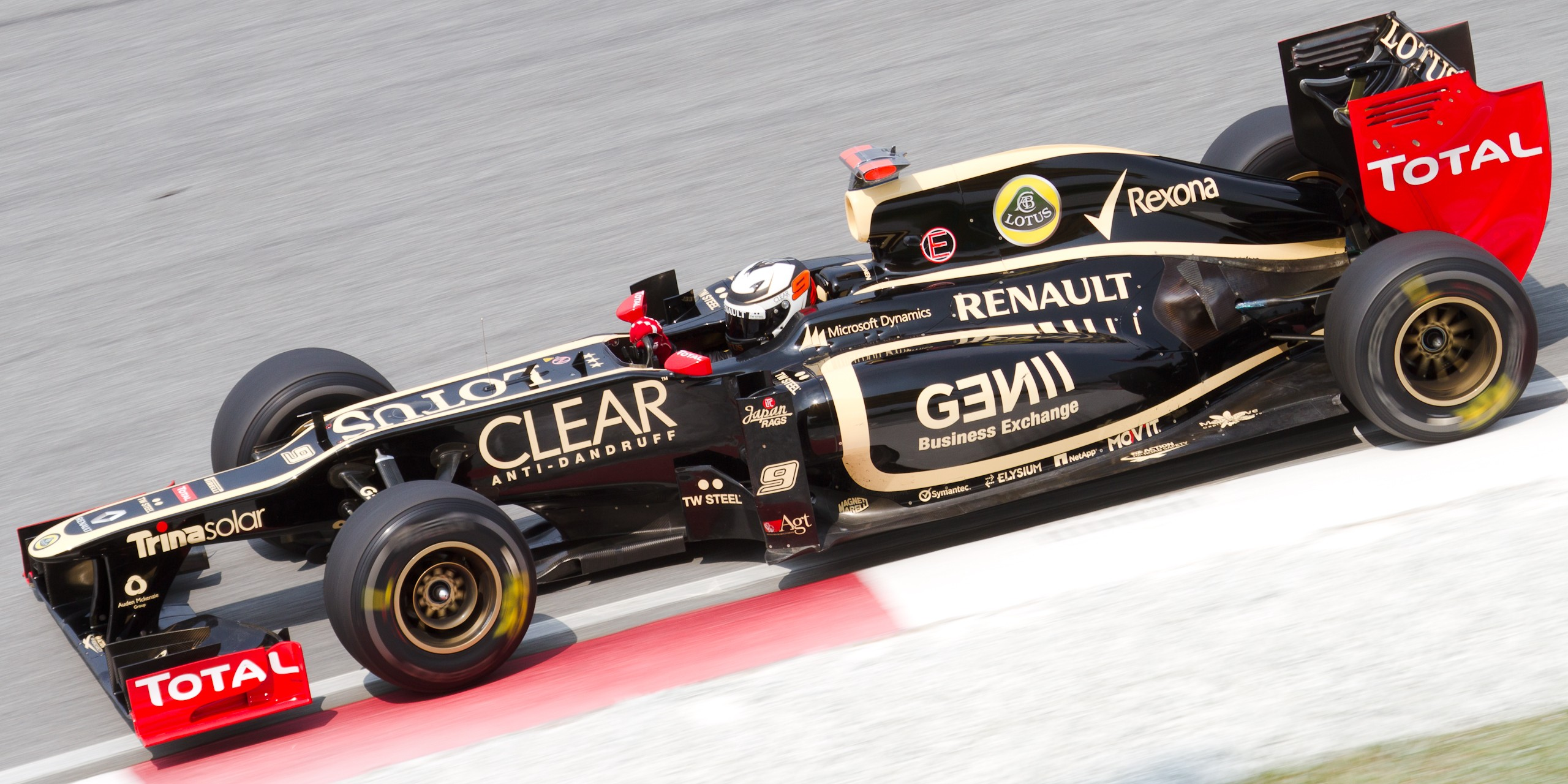
- Kimi Räikkönen driving the E20 at the Malaysian Grand Prix
- Category: Formula One
- Constructor: Lotus
- Designers: James Allison (Technical Director); Naoki Tokunaga (Deputy Technical Director); Martin Tolliday (Chief Designer); Simon Virrill (Deputy Chief Designer); Nick Chester (Head of Performance Systems); Dirk de Beer (Head of Aerodynamics); David Wheater (Deputy Head of Aerodynamics); Mike Elliott (Chief Aerodynamicist)
- Predecessor: Renault R31
- Successor: Lotus E21

Technical specifications
- Chassis: Carbon composite monocoque, incorporating the engine as a fully stressed member
- Suspension (front): Carbon composite double wishbone suspension
- Suspension (rear): As front
- Engine: Renault RS27-2012 2,400 cc (146.5 cu in) 90° V8, limited to 18,000 RPM, with KERS, naturally aspirated, mid-mounted
- Transmission: 7-speed, hydraulic power shift
- Power: >750 hp @ 18,000 rpm
- Fuel: Total
- Tyres: Pirelli P Zero (dry), Cinturato (wet)

Competition history
- Notable entrants: Lotus F1 Team
- Notable drivers: 9. (Finland) Kimi Räikkönen; 10. (France) Romain Grosjean; 10. (Belgium) Jérôme d'Ambrosio
- Debut: 2012 Australian Grand Prix
- First win: 2012 Abu Dhabi Grand Prix
- Last win: 2012 Abu Dhabi Grand Prix
- Last event: 2012 Brazilian Grand Prix
| Races | Wins | Podiums | Poles | F/Laps |
|---|---|---|---|---|
| 20 | 1 | 10 | 0 | 3 |

The Lotus E20 (originally known as the Renault R32) is a Formula One racing car designed and produced by the Enstone-based Lotus F1 Team for the 2012 Formula One season. The chassis was designed by James Allison, Naoki Tokunaga, Martin Tolliday, Nick Chester and Dirk de Beer with Renault continuing to supply engines. The E20 was the twentieth Formula One car to be designed at Enstone since 1992, and was named in tribute to the contribution made by the facility and its personnel in their twenty-year history. The car was also the first from Enstone to carry the Lotus name, since the team ceased using the Renault name following their renaming from Lotus Renault GP at the end of 2011. The car, which was launched by the team on its website on 5 February 2012, was driven by 2007 World Drivers' Champion Kimi Räikkönen and reigning GP2 Series champion Romain Grosjean, both of whom returned to Formula One after a two-year absence.

The car made its competitive debut at the 2012 Australian Grand Prix, and in the twenty races of the 2012 season, recorded a race win in Abu Dhabi and nine podium finishes to finish fourth overall in the World Constructors' Championship.

== Design ==
=== Ride height system ===
The Lotus E20 was planned to feature a "reactive ride height" suspension system — a mechanical device designed to maintain ride height under braking — at the start of the 2012 season. Lotus (and formerly both their immediate predecessors, Lotus Renault GP and Renault F1 Team) had been developing the system since January 2010. The system used hydraulic cylinders located in the brake calipers and suspension push-rods to make minute adjustments to the ride height of the car, thereby keeping the ride height at an optimal level throughout the race and providing stability during braking. This initially had the approval of the FIA, who reversed their position one week later ruling that such systems were in breach of their regulations, on the grounds that the primary function of such a device was improve the aerodynamic performance of cars, and was therefore in violation of Article 3.15 of the technical regulations, which states that "any device that influences the car's aerodynamics must remain immobile in relation to the sprung part of the car". The teams were notified of the FIA's decision on 20 January 2012, and as a consequence, the reactive ride height system did not feature on 2012 cars.

=== Testing problems ===
The team was forced to withdraw from the second pre-season test in Barcelona when Grosjean complained about a "strange" feeling in the chassis while driving on the opening morning of the test. The team gave no official diagnosis of the problem at the time, but speculation within the media suggested the problem was related to the front suspension and that the problem presented itself at the Circuit de Catalunya because of the higher lateral loads placed on the chassis at the circuit than those experienced at Jerez. James Allison, the team's technical director, later confirmed that the team had identified the problem as being the mounting of the upper front wishbone on the rear suspension arm. Grosjean had been testing the chassis designated E20-02 at the time; the chassis E20-01 was returned to the team's Enstone facility following completion of testing at Jerez. Upon discovering the problem, Lotus initially prepared chassis E20-01 to be transported to Barcelona to complete the test, but simulations revealed that the problem was also present on E20-01, and so the team decided to withdraw from the remainder of the test with immediate effect. The problem was then corrected in time for the team to start the season.

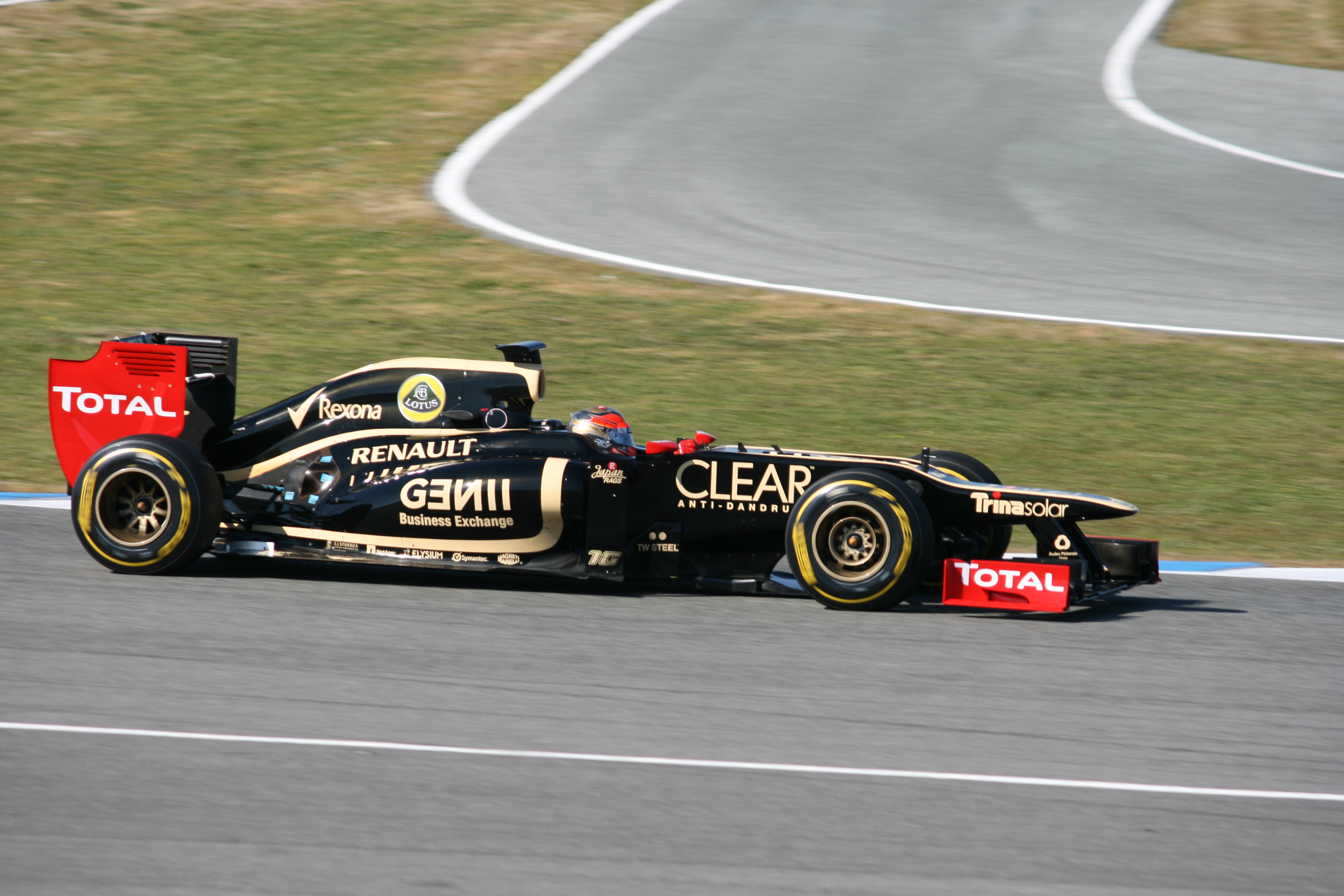
Grosjean testing the E20 in Jerez

=== "The Device" ===
The Lotus E20 was one of the only cars on the 2012 grid to use a version of the "double-DRS" system used by Mercedes on the rear wing of the W03 chassis. The wing used the F-duct concept developed by McLaren in 2010, which blew air across the surface of the wing to "stall" it, thereby cancelling out all downforce and drag running over the wing, allowing the car to achieve a higher top speed. The system developed by Mercedes was reported to create an F-duct effect over the front wing when the Drag Reduction System (DRS) flap in the rear wing opened. Opening the flap would expose two vents, which channeled air back through the car and over the front wing, cancelling out the downforce generated by the front wing with the intention of increasing stability in high-speed corners. Lotus initially opposed the system, and filed a formal protest as they believed it to be a moveable aerodynamic device and therefore in violation of Article 3.15 of the sport's technical regulations, the same Article under which the E20's reactive ride-height system had been challenged. The FIA ultimately rejected Lotus's protest, allowing Mercedes to continue using the double-DRS device and paving the way for Lotus to introduce their own version of it.

Two days after the 2012 Hungarian Grand Prix, the teams unanimously agreed to ban the use of double-DRS systems for the 2013 season. Nevertheless, Lotus continued their development of a double-DRS system, which they referred to as "The Device", and anticipated its introduction at the Belgian Grand Prix, one month later. However, heavy rain in the first two practice sessions at the Spa-Francorchamps circuit delayed The Device's introduction. The team's plans were further put on hold after Grosjean was banned from taking part in the Italian Grand Prix for his role in a multi-car pile-up at the start of the Belgian Grand Prix. Grosjean was replaced by the team's testing and reserve driver, Jérôme d'Ambrosio, but d'Ambrosio's inexperience with the 2012-specification of cars and the low-downforce nature of the Monza circuit — which meant that any gain a double-DRS system had to offer would be negated — prompted the team to delay The Device's introduction even further, naming the Japanese Grand Prix in early October as their planned point of introduction. The team used the double-DRS system as planned during Friday practice, but shelved it until the third round of Young Driver Tests in November after being unhappy with their progress. Räikkönen admitted that using the system made finding the proper setup for the car much more difficult than without it. By comparison, Red Bull Racing introduced their own variant on the system at the Singapore and Japanese Grands Prix, which was credited with aiding Sebastian Vettel in securing two race wins.

By the end of the season and in spite its extensive development programme, "The Device" was never raced. However, the concept was carried over to the Lotus E20's successor, the E21, with the team pledging to continue development throughout the 2013 season. The system was finally raced for the first time at the 2013 British Grand Prix, when it was fitted on Räikkönen's car; the team opted not to use it on the sister car of Grosjean so as to evaluate its performance relative to the older specification of car.

=== Coandă-effect exhaust ===
With the double-DRS "Device" shelved for the foreseeable future, the team instead turned their attention to the exhaust, introducing a Coandă-effect system for the Korean Grand Prix. The system, also used by McLaren and Ferrari, used the curved shape of the bodywork at the rear of the car to guide the flow of exhaust gases, creating a low-pressure area over the car's diffuser. The team had previously considered launching the car with a Coandă-effect system, but opted to start the season with a conventional exhaust layout as they felt it was more important to start the season with a car that they knew was competitive rather than attempt to understand both the car and the complex properties of the Coandă effect at the same time.

== Season review ==
The Lotus E20 showed its potential early in the season when Grosjean qualified third for the Australian Grand Prix. However, the team would go on to experience a difficult season in which they never quite made the most of the car's potential, let down by poor race management and frequent entanglements in on-track incidents. Despite predictions that the team would be competing for race wins — if not the Drivers' and Constructors' Championships' — as early as April, the team would remain winless by October.

Grosjean's strong performance in qualifying for the race in Australia came to nothing when he made contact with Pastor Maldonado on the second lap and retired on the spot. Räikkönen, who had struggled in qualifying and started the race from seventeenth place, made the best of a bad situation to finish the race seventh. The team fared little better in the next race in Malaysia; both Grosjean and Räikkönen qualified comfortably inside the top ten, but Grosjean made contact with Michael Schumacher on the first lap and slipped down the order before spinning off, while Räikkönen was given a grid penalty for an unscheduled gearbox change and had to fight to recover to fifth. The team's troubles continued in China; once again, both drivers qualified inside the top ten, but Räikkönen's race was compromised by poor tyre management and he lost eleven positions in a single lap. Grosjean, on the other hand, managed a clean race and was rewarded with his first points in Formula One.

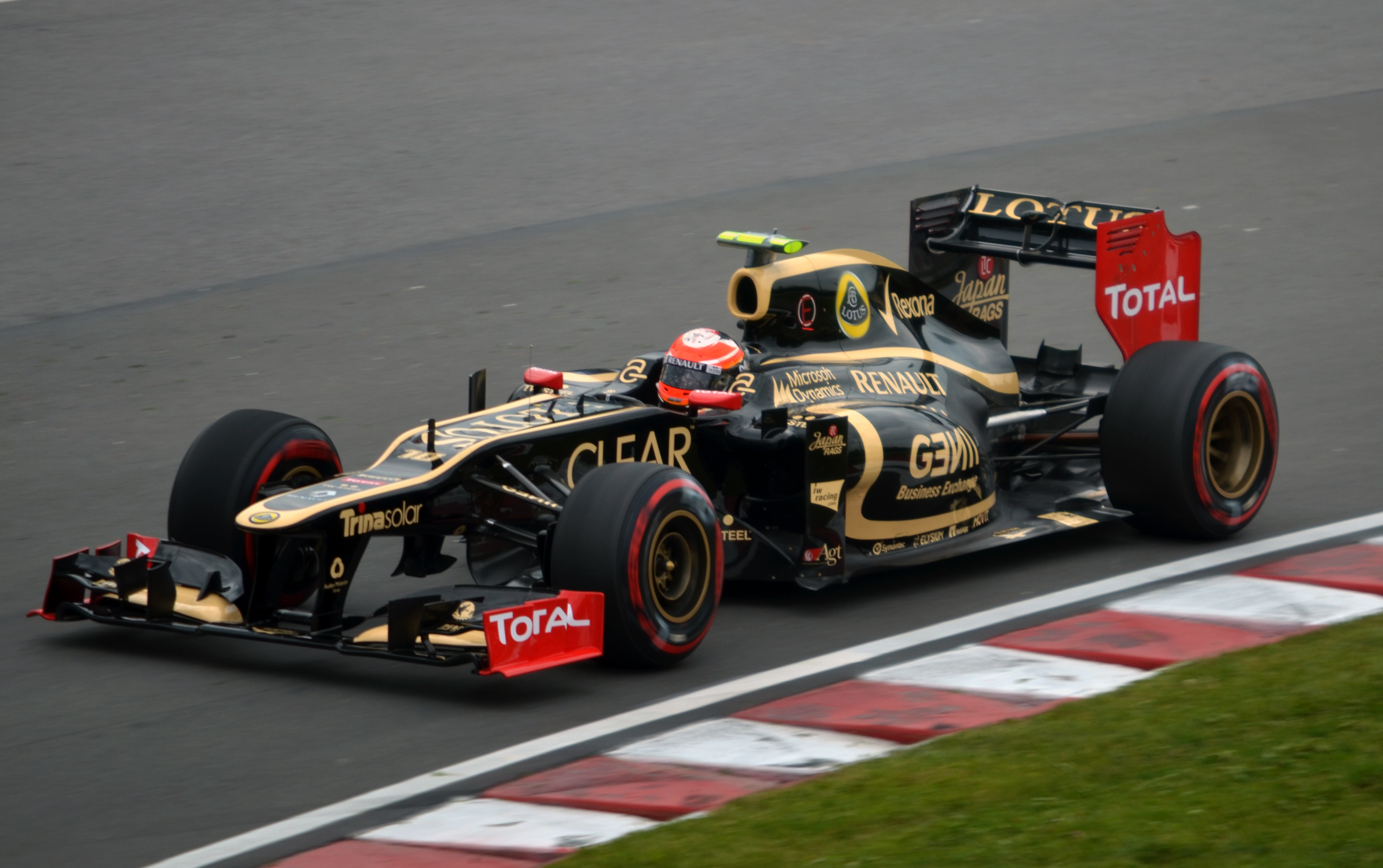
Grosjean finished on the podium in Canada

The Bahrain Grand Prix represented a breakthrough for the team, with both Räikkönen and Grosjean finishing the race on the podium behind race winner Sebastian Vettel. Both drivers had challenged Vettel for the lead over the course of the race, and while neither managed to catch the reigning World Champion, it was an encouraging sign for team, and one that they would back up at the next race in Spain, with Räikkönen scoring his second consecutive podium after attempting a daring strategy in which he tried to force race winner Pastor Maldonado and Fernando Alonso to drive beyond the life expectancy of their tyres. Räikkönen ran out of laps before Maldonado and Alonso ran out of grip, and the 2007 World Champion finished third, with Grosjean fourth.

The team's fortunes came crashing back down to earth in Monaco when Grosjean was at the centre of a first-lap accident that put himself, Maldonado, Kamui Kobayashi and Pedro de la Rosa out of the race. Räikkönen, meanwhile, struggled after losing valuable track time during Friday practice, as he was unhappy with parts introduced onto the car for the race. He qualified eighth and went on to finish the race ninth. The team's poor form in Monaco proved to be an exception, rather than the rule, as Grosjean went on to finish the Canadian Grand Prix in second place after race leaders Alonso and Vettel fell victim to the ultra-sensitive Pirelli tyres; Grosjean later admitted that he had not thought a podium was possible until he found himself running second with three laps left to run. Räikkönen, on the other hand, missed out on a spot in the top ten on the grid, and so had to work his way up from twelfth to eighth. Grosjean was in contention for his maiden race win in Valencia after an alternator failure forced race leader Sebastian Vettel to retire. Grosjean kept pace with new race leader Fernando Alonso, only to fall victim to the same alternator failure seven laps later. Räikkönen, meanwhile, took advantage of this to finish the race second behind Alonso.

The British Grand Prix proved disappointing for Lotus, with Grosjean spinning off during qualifying and Räikkönen struggling with the wet conditions. In the race, Grosjean made contact with Paul di Resta on the first lap; di Resta retired, while Grosjean was forced to pit for a new front wing, shuffling him back down the order to twenty-third. He later recovered to finish sixth behind Räikkönen, both drivers having struggled to match the leaders for pace all race long. Both drivers struggled in qualifying for the German Grand Prix, with Räikkönen starting tenth after being caught out by heavy rain in the middle of the session, and Grosjean managing no better than fifteenth. Räikkönen, however, recovered in the race to finish fourth, inheriting a podium when Sebastian Vettel was given a twenty-second post-race penalty for passing Jenson Button off the circuit. Grosjean, meanwhile, finished eighteenth, a lap behind race winner Alonso. The team bounced back once again in Hungary, with Grosjean qualifying on the front row and finishing third after the team managed to find a strategy for Räikkönen that saw him steal second place away from his team-mate.

Disaster struck in Belgium. Grosjean was once again involved in a first-lap incident when he cut across the circuit at the start, clipping Lewis Hamilton and being launched into Alonso and Sergio Pérez. The violent nature of the accident led to the stewards handing down a one-race ban for Grosjean. Räikkönen salvaged what he could to finish third, but expressed disappointment with the result given his previous achievements at the circuit, including four wins in five starts. With Grosjean forced to miss the Italian Grand Prix, the team drafted their testing and reserve driver, Jérôme d'Ambrosio, to drive car #10 for the race. D'Ambrosio qualified sixteenth and took advantage of high-profile retirements for Sebastian Vettel and Jenson Button to finish thirteenth, the last car to be classified on the lead lap. Räikkönen had a quiet race, starting fifth and finishing seventh.

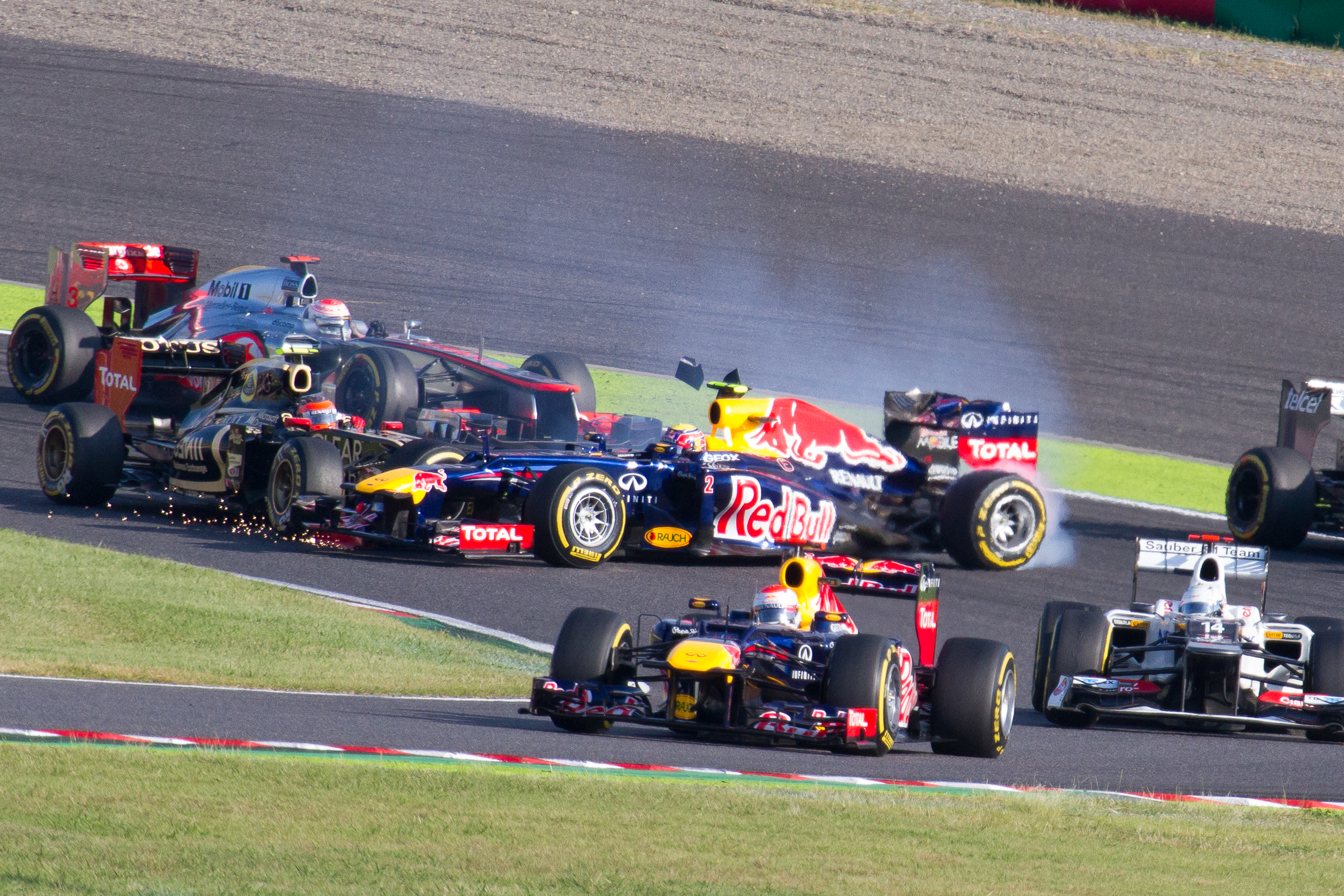
Grosjean was criticised for causing another first-lap incident, this time spinning Mark Webber around at the start of the Japanese Grand Prix.

Grosjean returned to the car in Singapore, and once again out-qualified Räikkönen, starting eighth while his team-mate could do no better than twelfth. In the race it was Räikkönen who performed better, finishing sixth, a second ahead of Grosjean. Despite not having won a race by this point, Räikkönen remained in championship contention, sitting in third place, forty-five points behind championship leader Fernando Alonso. While Alonso's nearest rival, Sebastian Vettel, would make significant in-roads into Alonso's championship lead in Japan, Räikkönen went on to finish sixth after making contact with Alonso during the start that forced the Ferrari driver out of the race. Grosjean, on the other hand, was once again caught up in a first-corner melee, making contact with Mark Webber and earning a ten-second stop-go penalty for his troubles, the harshest in-race penalty available to the race stewards. With eight first-lap incidents from fourteen starts to his name in 2012 alone, Red Bull Racing team principal Christian Horner opined that Lotus "needed to control" Grosjean, describing the Frenchman as dangerous to himself and others.

Both cars finished in the points once more at the Korean Grand Prix, with Räikkönen and Grosjean finishing where they started in fifth and seventh place, but the team lost further ground to Red Bull Racing and Ferrari in the World Constructors' Championship. The team scored another double points finish two weeks later in India, with Räikkönen finishing seventh — having spent much of the race stuck behind Felipe Massa — and Grosjean climbing from eleventh to finish ninth overall. Räikkönen would later claim that a podium finish was possible, but mistakes made during the final free practice session and qualifying cost him dearly.

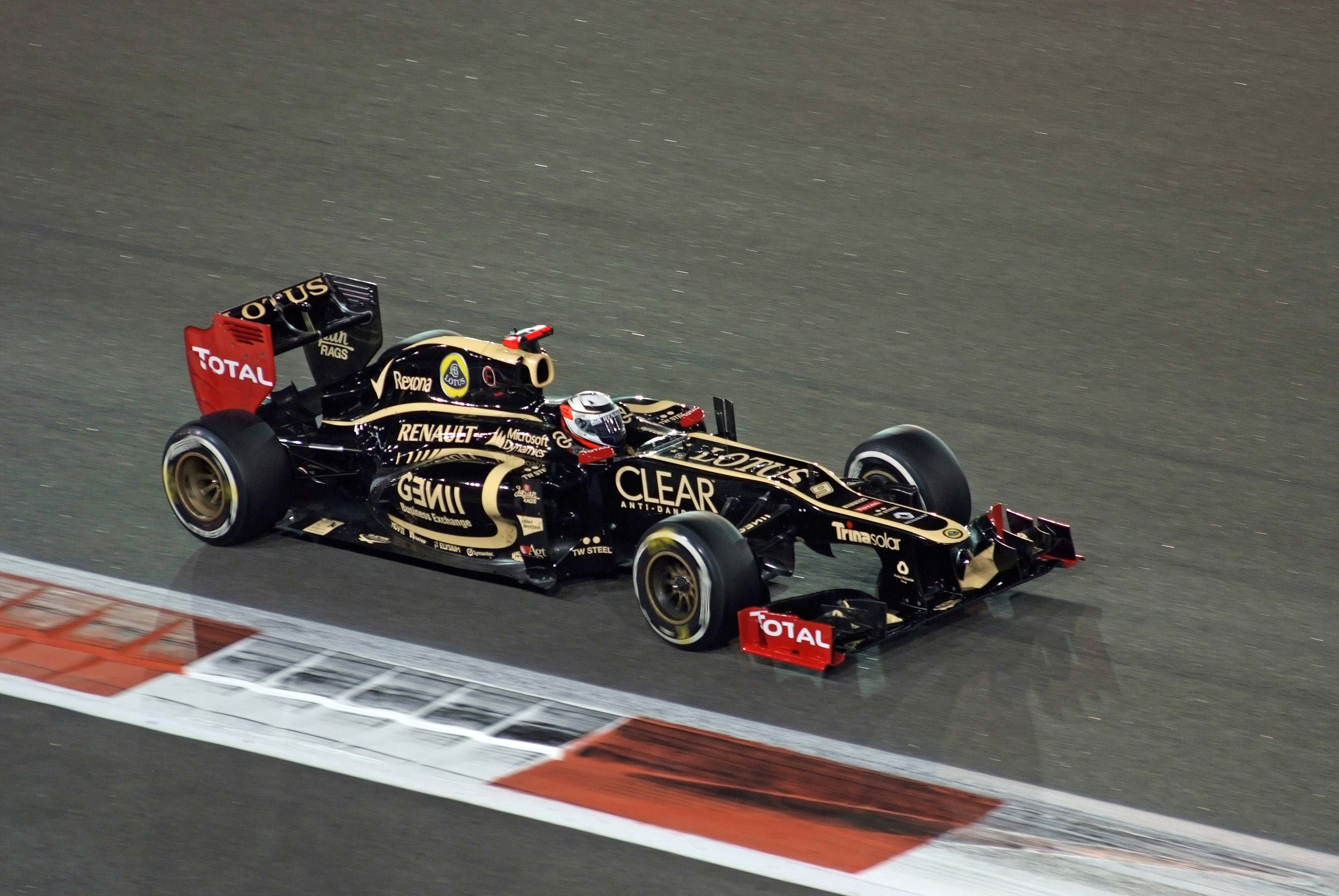
Räikkönen took the victory in Abu Dhabi, his first since the 2009 Belgian Grand Prix

One week later in Abu Dhabi, Räikkönen picked up two positions off the start line to be second as the cars began their first lap, inheriting the lead when Lewis Hamilton's McLaren developed a terminal electrical fault that forced him out of the race. Räikkönen held onto the position for the remainder of the race despite a late challenge from Fernando Alonso, finally winning Lotus' first race in 2012 six months after it had been predicted. Grosjean, on the other hand, was involved in early contact that forced him to pit to repair damage. He recovered to fifth, but retired when Sergio Pérez veered sharply onto the circuit after being forced off by Paul di Resta. Pérez and Grosjean made contact, pushing Grosjean into the path of Mark Webber, and the two retired with collision damage.

The team were unable to continue their winning form in the United States; despite Räikkönen's surprise at a strong qualifying performance when both he and Grosjean had struggled for grip throughout free practice, any potential for a podium finish was lost when Grosjean spun early in the race and a clutch problem held Räikkönen during his one and only pit stop. Räikkönen and Grosjean went on to finish in sixth and seventh places respectively, while Lewis Hamilton's race win put third place in the World Constructors' Championship out of Lotus's reach. The team scored just a single point at the final race of the season in Brazil, when Räikkönen finished tenth. Grosjean spun out and crashed heavily early on in difficult conditions, while Räikkönen made a poor tyre choice and fell down the order. He was later running as high as sixth, but lost a considerable amount of time in a bizarre incident where he left the circuit and attempted to re-join using the support paddock pit lane, only to find that the way was blocked, which forced him to turn around and re-join the circuit another way. He recovered to eleventh, which became tenth when Paul di Resta crashed out two laps from the end of the race.

== Sponsorship and livery ==
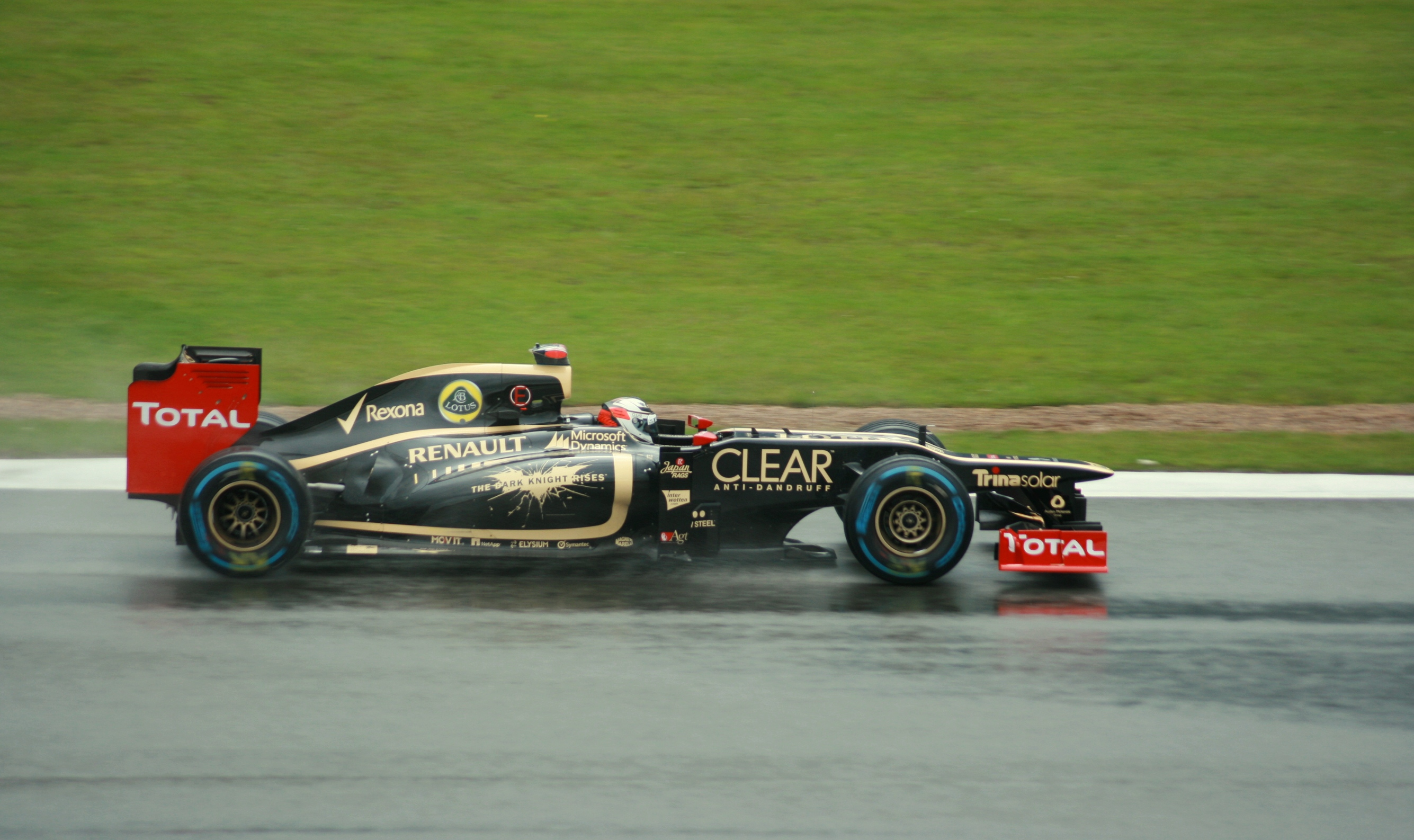
Räikkönen's E20 with The Dark Knight Rises special livery during the British Grand Prix

Like the previous season's car, the E20 sported a black and gold livery adopted by the John Player Special Lotus cars from the early 1970s to mid-1980s. From the Spanish Grand Prix onwards, Lotus gained Interwetten as a sponsor, which was displayed on the car's sidepods; at the Canadian Grand Prix, this was replaced by branding for the Austrian motorsport team Interwetten Racing.

The team celebrated its 500th race entry in Monaco, and the team unveiled a special livery inspired by Angry Birds, and partnered with alternative rock band Linkin Park at the same event to promote an iPad application. The team promoted the movie The Dark Knight Rises at the British Grand Prix. The team promoted the game Angry Birds Star Wars at the United States Grand Prix.

== Complete Formula One results ==
(key) (results in bold indicate pole position; results in italics indicate fastest lap)

| Year | Entrant | Engine | Tyres | Drivers | 1 | 2 | 3 | 4 | 5 | 6 | 7 | 8 | 9 | 10 | 11 | 12 | 13 | 14 | 15 | 16 | 17 | 18 | 19 | 20 | Points | WCC |
|---|---|---|---|---|---|---|---|---|---|---|---|---|---|---|---|---|---|---|---|---|---|---|---|---|---|---|
| 2012 | Lotus F1 Team | Renault RS27-2012 | **P** | | AUS | MAL | CHN | BHR | ESP | MON | CAN | EUR | GBR | GER | HUN | BEL | ITA | SIN | JPN | KOR | IND | ABU | USA | BRA | 303 | 4th |
| 2012 | Lotus F1 Team | Renault RS27-2012 | **P** | (Finland) Kimi Räikkönen | 7 | 5 | 14 | 2 | 3 | 9 | 8 | 2 | 5 | 3 | 2 | 3 | 5 | 6 | 6 | 5 | 7 | 1 | 6 | 10 | 303 | 4th |
| 2012 | Lotus F1 Team | Renault RS27-2012 | **P** | (France) Romain Grosjean | Ret | Ret | 6 | 3 | 4 | Ret | 2 | Ret | 6 | 18 | 3 | Ret | EX | 7 | 19† | 7 | 9 | Ret | 7 | Ret | 303 | 4th |
| 2012 | Lotus F1 Team | Renault RS27-2012 | **P** | (Belgium) Jérôme d'Ambrosio | | | | | | | | | | | | | 13 | | | | | | | | 303 | 4th |

† Driver failed to finish the race, but was classified as they had completed greater than 90% of the race distance.

== Later uses ==
The E20 was run in the Renault R.S.17 livery for demonstration laps by Robert Kubica throughout 2017. Aseel Al-Hamad completed a celebratory lap in the E20 car ahead of the 2018 French Grand Prix. The car was also run in 2022 in the Alpine A522 livery for demonstration laps by Al-Hamad and Abbi Pulling. The car has also been used in 2025 in the Alpine A525 livery.

== Other appearances ==
The car featured in the music video Dangerous by Sam Martin and David Guetta.
