= Renault R30 =

2010 Formula One racing car

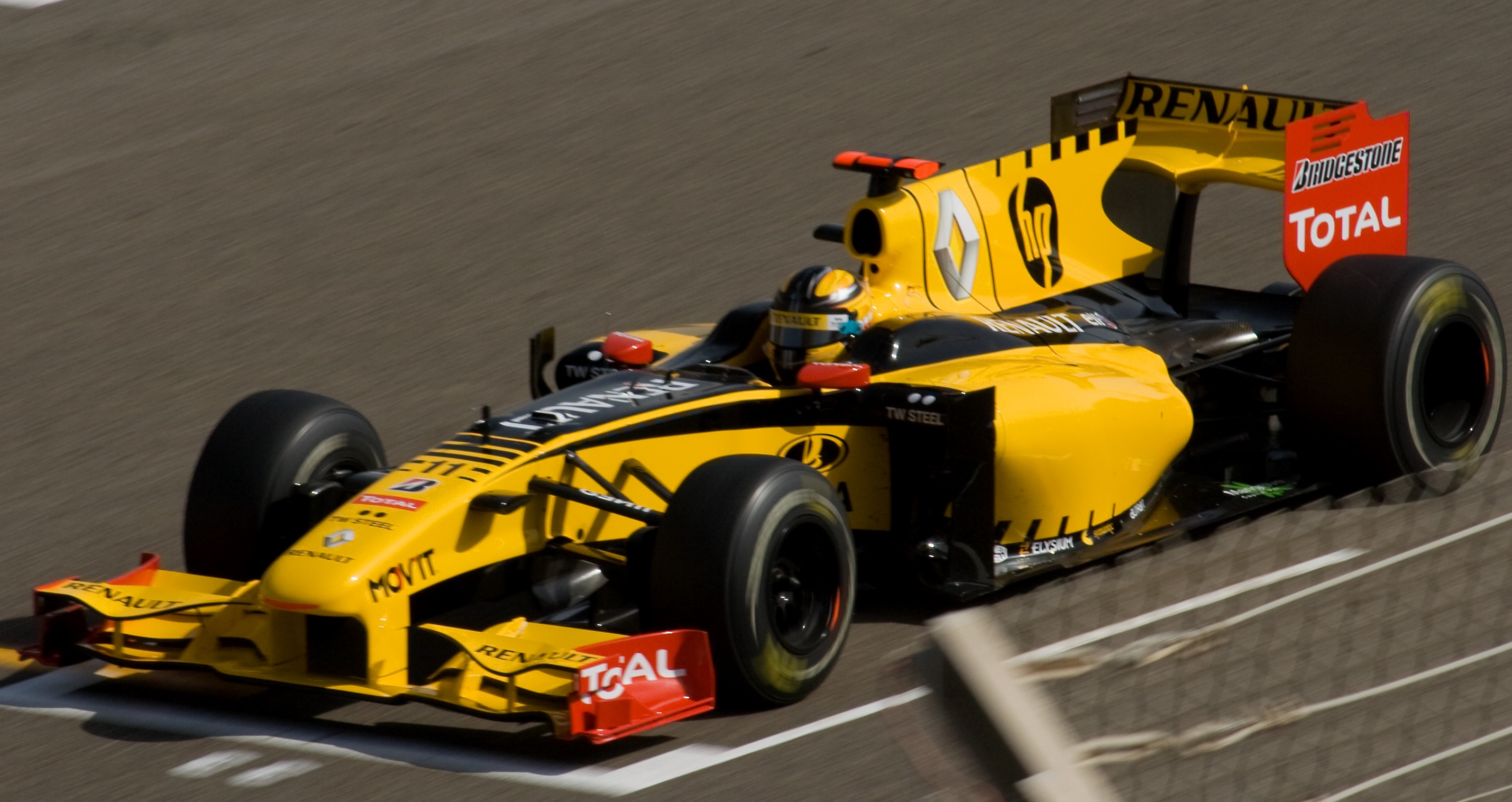
- Robert Kubica driving the R30 at the Bahrain Grand Prix.
- Category: Formula One
- Constructor: Renault
- Designers: Bob Bell (Managing Director); James Allison (Technical Director); Naoki Tokunaga (Deputy Technical Director); Tim Densham (Chief Designer); Martin Tolliday (Deputy Chief Designer); Robin Tuluie (Head of R&D); Nick Chester (Head of Performance Systems); Dirk de Beer (Head of Aerodynamics); David Wheater (Deputy Head of Aerodynamics); Mike Elliott (Chief Aerodynamicist); Rob White (Engine Technical Director); Axel Plasse (Project Manager - Engine)
- Predecessor: Renault R29
- Successor: Renault R31

Technical specifications
- Chassis: Moulded carbon fibre and aluminium honeycomb composite monocoque, with engine incorporated as a fully stressed member
- Suspension (front): Carbon fibre double wishbone, operating inboard torsion bar and damper units via a pushrod system
- Suspension (rear): As front
- Engine: Renault RS27-2010 2,400 cc (146.5 cu in) 90° V8, limited to 18,000 RPM naturally aspirated mid-mounted
- Transmission: Seven-speed semi-automatic titanium gearbox with reverse gear "Quickshift" system
- Power: >750 hp @ 18,000 rpm
- Weight: 620 kg (1,367 lb) (including driver)
- Fuel: Total
- Tyres: Bridgestone Potenza; OZ Wheels (front and rear): 13"

Competition history
- Notable entrants: Renault F1 Team
- Notable drivers: 11. (Poland) Robert Kubica; 12. (Russia) Vitaly Petrov
- Debut: 2010 Bahrain Grand Prix
- Last event: 2010 Abu Dhabi Grand Prix
Races	Wins	Podiums	Poles	F/Laps
19	0	3	0	2

The Renault R30 was a Formula One motor racing car designed and built by Renault for the 2010 season. The car was driven by Robert Kubica and rookie Vitaly Petrov. Test drivers were Ho-Pin Tung, Jérôme d'Ambrosio and Jan Charouz.

It was unveiled on January 31, 2010, at the Circuit Ricardo Tormo in Valencia.

== Design ==
The chassis was designed by James Allison, Naoki Tokunaga, Tim Densham, Nick Chester, Martin Tolliday, Mike Elliott and Dirk de Beer with Rob White leading the engine design.

At the Belgian Grand Prix, Renault introduced the F-duct on the R30, having been postponed since Silverstone due to inefficiency.

== Season summary ==
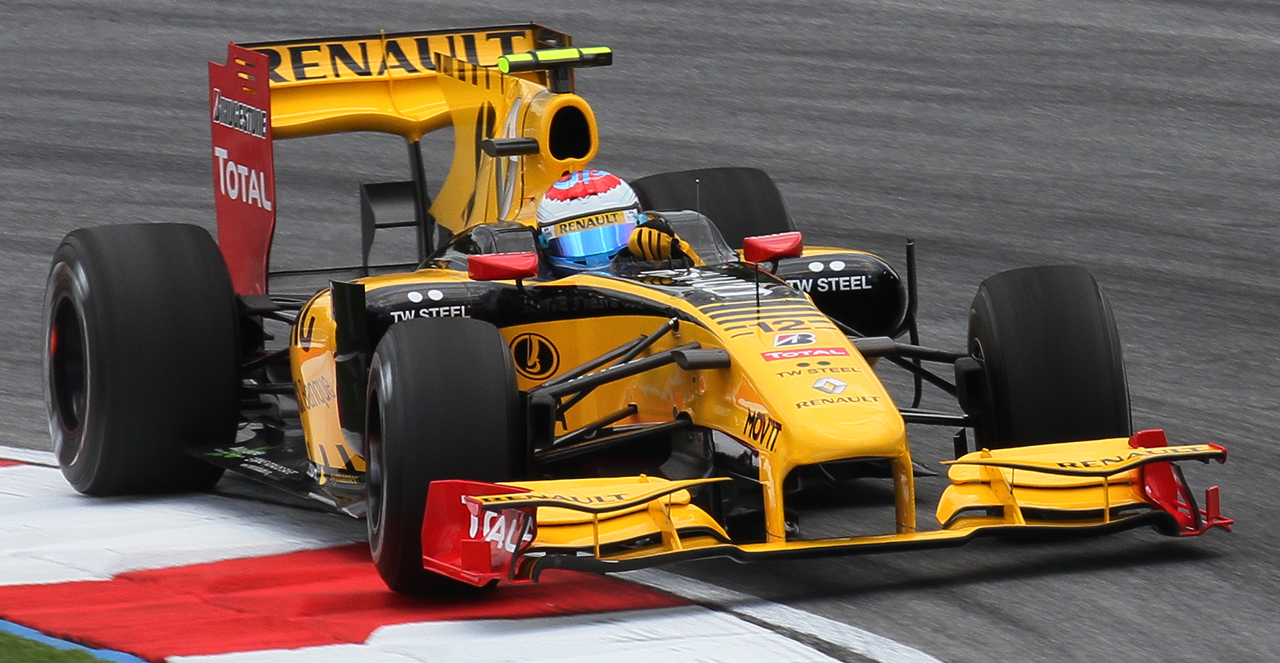
Petrov retired from the Malaysian Grand Prix with an engine failure; his third consecutive retirement.

In the season-opening race in Bahrain, the Renault R30 performed creditably in qualifying: Kubica was ninth and Petrov seventeenth. The race itself, however, proved difficult, and only Kubica managed to cross the finish line, placing eleventh. In Melbourne, Renault surprised everyone when Kubica drove to a podium finish (second place), while Petrov was once again forced to retire. In Malaysia, Kubica again scored points by finishing fourth—demonstrating the R30's competitiveness—but Petrov failed to finish. In the Shanghai race, which began in dry conditions but ended in rain, Kubica secured an impressive fifth place, while Petrov finished a race for the first time, coming in seventh.

In Spain, Renault appeared to take a step back, with Kubica finishing 8th and Petrov 11th. However, in Monaco, the car was highly competitive; Kubica secured a podium finish, coming in 3rd after starting 2nd on the grid. Petrov failed to reach the finish line but was classified as a finisher, having completed 90% of the race distance. In Turkey, Renault was less competitive, yet Kubica still finished 6th, while Petrov finished 15th—setting the fastest lap in the process—despite suffering a puncture in the closing stages following contact with Fernando Alonso. In Canada, the R30 performed reasonably well; Kubica set the race's fastest lap and finished seventh, whereas Petrov had a poor outing, finishing 17th and incurring two penalties—one for a jump start and another for immediately colliding with Pedro de la Rosa. At the European Grand Prix, both Renaults reached Q3, with Kubica starting 7th and Petrov 10th. After an eventful race, Kubica finished 5th, while Petrov finished 14th, having received a five-second penalty for improving his lap time under safety car conditions.

At the British Grand Prix, Kubica qualified in a creditable 6th place, while Petrov managed only 16th. Kubica was forced to retire due to a differential problem, and Petrov finished 13th. At the German Grand Prix, Kubica qualified 7th and Petrov 13th. In the race, both Renaults finished in the points, with Kubica taking 7th and Petrov 10th. At the Hungarian Grand Prix, both Renaults again reached Q3; Petrov started 7th with Kubica right behind in 8th. During the race, Kubica retired with a suspension issue following a pit-lane collision with Sutil, while Petrov finished 5th—his best result to date. At the Belgian Grand Prix, Renault introduced its F-duct for the first time; this yielded a great result for Kubica, who started and finished 3rd, while Petrov—starting 23rd after a qualifying crash—recovered to finish 9th, marking one of Renault's best races of the season. At the Italian Grand Prix, Kubica qualified 9th, and Petrov 20th following a penalty. In the race, Kubica finished 8th and Petrov 13th. In Singapore, Kubica qualified 8th and Petrov 13th; during the race, Kubica, meanwhile, staged a fine recovery drive in the closing laps. After a puncture had dropped him out of the points, he fought his way back to seventh place with a series of impressive overtaking moves, while Petrov finished 11th. At the Japanese Grand Prix, Kubica qualified 4th and Petrov 13th. The race itself was a disaster for Renault: Petrov retired after a crash at the start, and Kubica lost a wheel on the second lap.

At the Korean Grand Prix, Kubica qualified 8th and Petrov 15th. In the race, Kubica finished 5th, while Petrov retired following an accident. At the Brazilian Grand Prix, Kubica qualified 7th and Petrov 10th, with both drivers reaching Q3 during a wet qualifying session. In the race—held in dry conditions—Kubica finished 9th and Petrov 16th. At the final race of the year in Abu Dhabi, Kubica qualified 11th and Petrov 10th. In the race, Kubica finished 5th and Petrov 6th, with the latter holding off Alonso throughout the race.

The Renault team finished the season in 5th place with 163 points.

== Sponsorship and livery ==
After the loss of sponsorship with the Dutch banking group ING Group, the car returned to the historic yellow-black livery, used (with some variations) by Renault in Formula 1 up to the RE60 in the 1985 season. The profiles of the spoilers were instead red, hosting the sponsorship of the oil company Total.

The team never had a title sponsor in 2010 and in the pre-season tests the livery actually appeared very bare of third-party brands. The only partnership of any importance was the one with the Dutch watchmaker TW Steel, whose logo stood out on the nose and above the radiator openings. Close to the start of the championship, a two-year collaboration agreement was signed with technology company Hewlett-Packard (whose brand appeared on the fin of the bonnet), while the entry of the share capital of the Genii investment fund team Capital led to the affixing of the relevant logo on the front suspension arms. The presence of the second driver Petrov conveyed the Lada brand, applied to the sides of the front section of the car, while on the sides of the bellies the DIAC logo appeared, a Renault group company specialized in credit for the purchase of motor vehicles.

During the season, the Banka brands SNORAS (which replaced DIAC), EFG International, TrinaSolar and MOVIT also made their entry.

== Other ==
During the third free practice session (FP3) of the Bahrain Grand Prix, Kubica unexpectedly discovered an iPhone in his cockpit, between his legs. He contacted his engineer and asked, "Someone has left a phone in my cockpit. What should I do throw it out, or come into the pits?" The team immediately ordered him to return to the pits; Kubica then stopped outside the team's garage, handed over the phone, and continued his run.

== Later uses ==
At the 2011 Goodwood Festival of Speed, the R30 was demonstrated in Lotus Renault R31 livery.

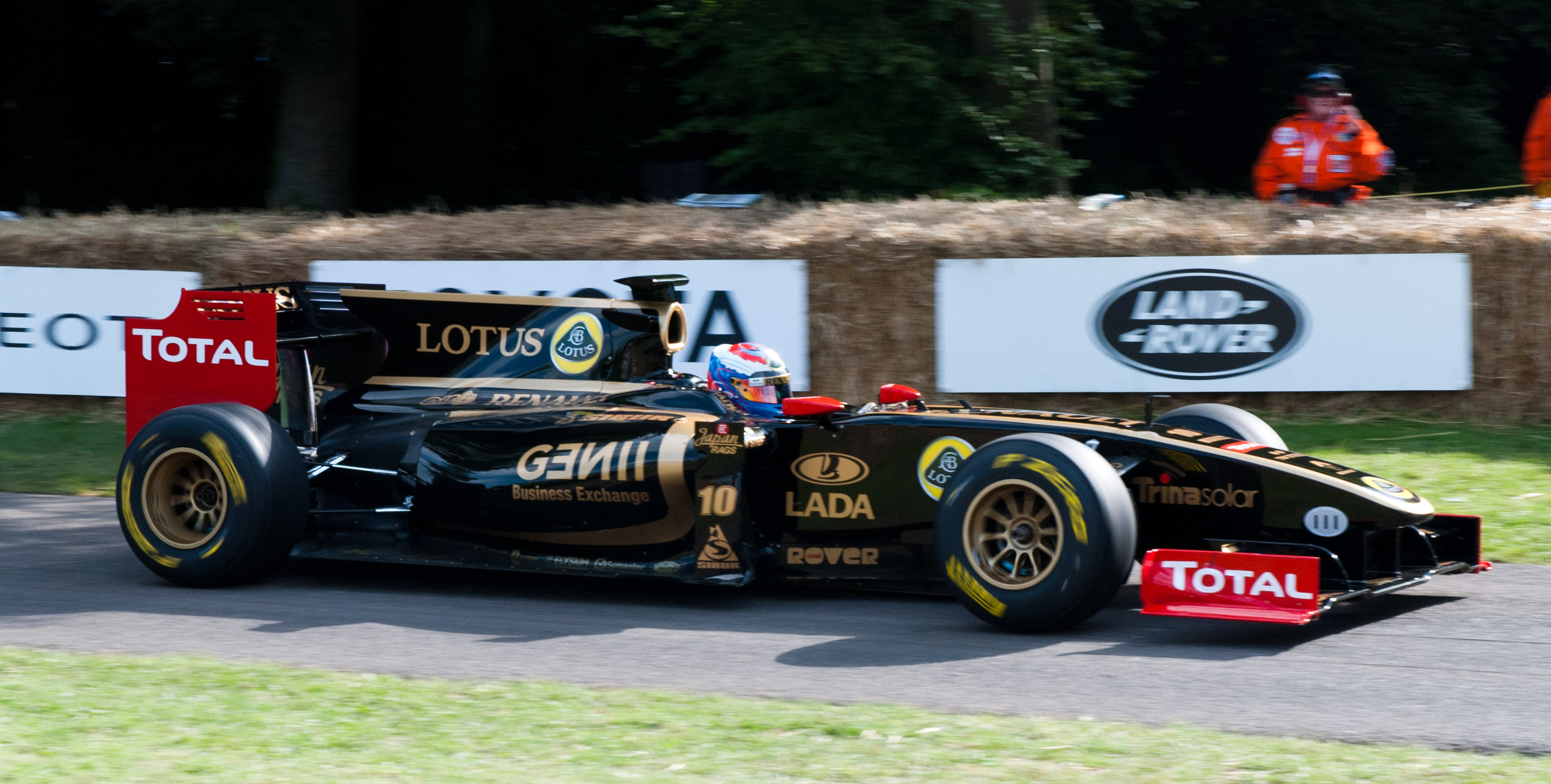
Petrov driving the R30 in the livery of its successor during the 2011 Goodwood Festival of Speed.

The tyre manufacturer Pirelli used the R30 chassis in 2012–2013 as a test car in tyre development replacing the Toyota TF109. The car was tested by Jaime Alguersuari and Lucas di Grassi at several European racetracks, including Jerez, Spa, Monza and Barcelona.

Kimi Räikkönen drove an R30 in Lotus E20 colors in a private test in Valencia on 23 and 24 January 2012.

== Other appearances ==
Vladimir Putin drove the R30 on a circuit around the Russian city of Saint Petersburg around November 2010.

== Complete Formula One results ==
(key) (results in bold indicate pole position; results in italics indicate fastest lap)

Year	Entrant	Engine	Tyres	Drivers	1	2	3	4	5	6	7	8	9	10	11	12	13	14	15	16	17	18	19	Points	WCC
2010	Renault F1 Team	Renault RS27 V8	**B**		BHR	AUS	MAL	CHN	ESP	MON	TUR	CAN	EUR	GBR	GER	HUN	BEL	ITA	SIN	JPN	KOR	BRA	ABU	163	5th
2010	Renault F1 Team	Renault RS27 V8	**B**	(Poland) Robert Kubica	11	2	4	5	8	3	6	7	5	Ret	7	Ret	3	8	7	Ret	5	9	5	163	5th
2010	Renault F1 Team	Renault RS27 V8	**B**	(Russia) Vitaly Petrov	Ret	Ret	Ret	7	11	13^{†}	15	17	14	13	10	5	9	13	11	Ret	Ret	16	6	163	5th

^{†} Driver failed to finish the race, but was classified as they had completed >90% of the race distance.
