= Renault R.S.17 =

Formula One racing car

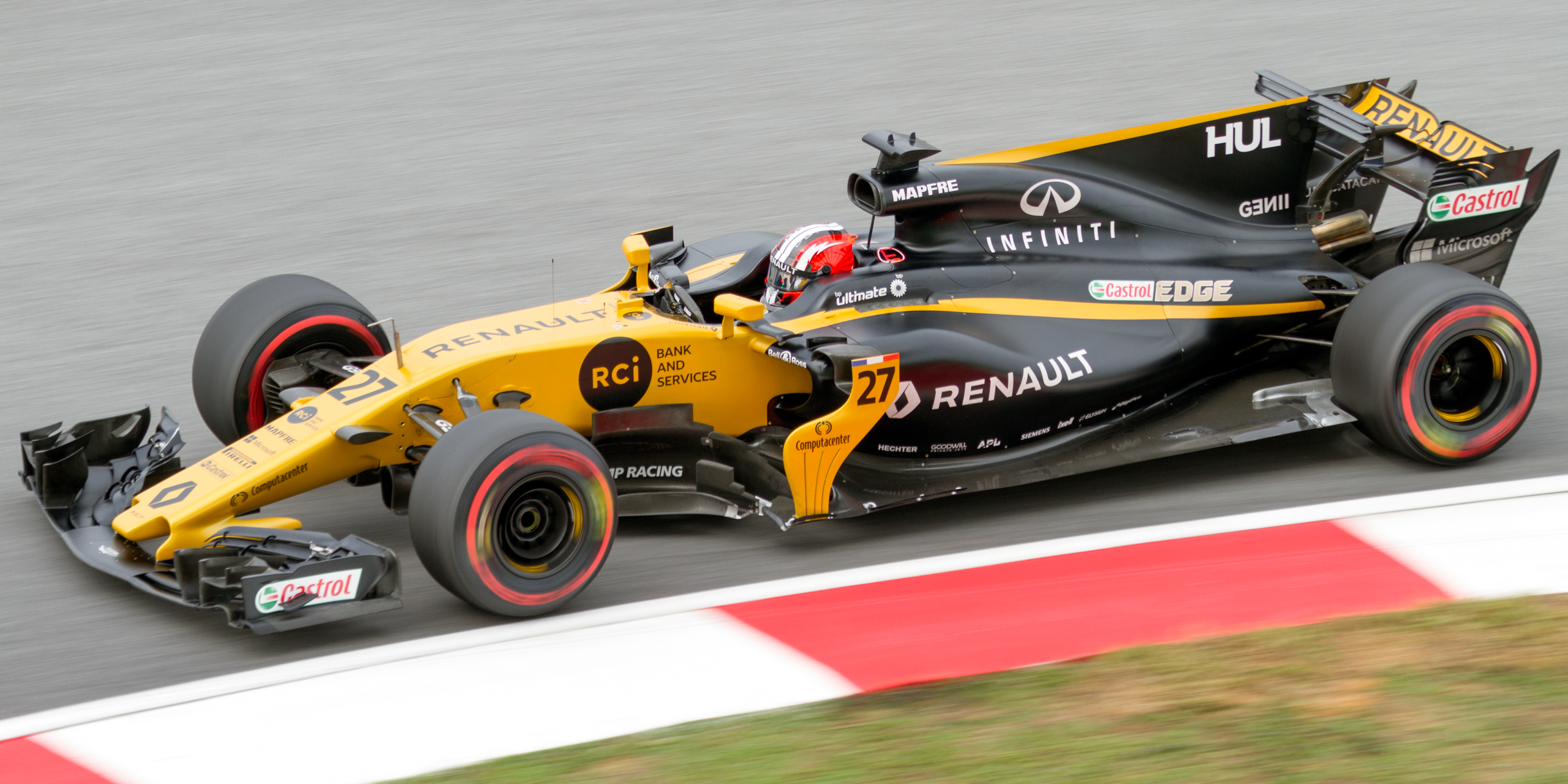
- Nico Hülkenberg driving the R.S.17 at the Malaysian Grand Prix
- Category: Formula One
- Constructor: Renault
- Designers: Bob Bell (Chief Technical Officer); Nick Chester (Chassis Technical Director); Chris Cooney (Engineering Director); Martin Tolliday (Chief Designer); Simon Virrill (Deputy Chief Designer); Pierre Genon (Head of Performance Systems); Jon Tomlinson (Head of Aerodynamics); Rémi Taffin (Engine Technical Director)
- Predecessor: Renault R.S.16
- Successor: Renault R.S.18

Technical specifications
- Chassis: Moulded carbon fibre and honeycomb composite structure
- Suspension (front): Upper and lower carbon fibre wishbone and pushrod activated torsion springs and rockers
- Suspension (rear): Upper and lower carbon fibre wishbone and pull-rod activated torsion springs and rockers
- Width: 2,000 mm (79 in)
- Height: 950 mm (37 in)
- Axle track: F: 1,600 mm (63 in); R: 1,550 mm (61 in)
- Engine: Mecachrome-built and assembled Renault R.E.17 turbocharged 1.6L (98 cu in) V6 engine, limited to 15,000 RPM in a mid-mounted, rear-wheel-drive layout
- Electric motor: Motor Generator Unit–Kinetic and Motor Generator Unit–Heat
- Transmission: Renault semi-automatic sequential gearbox with eight forward and one reverse gear
- Weight: 728 kg (1,605.0 lb) (incl. driver)
- Fuel: BP
- Lubricants: Castrol EDGE
- Brakes: Brembo carbon brake discs, pads and calipers AP Master cylinders
- Tyres: Pirelli P Zero (Dry/Slick); Pirelli Cinturato (Wet/Treaded); OZ Racing Wheels: 13"

Competition history
- Notable entrants: Renault Sport F1 Team
- Notable drivers: 27. (Germany) Nico Hülkenberg; 30. (United Kingdom) Jolyon Palmer; 55. (Spain) Carlos Sainz, Jr.
- Debut: 2017 Australian Grand Prix
- Last event: 2017 Abu Dhabi Grand Prix
Races	Wins	Podiums	Poles	F/Laps
20	0	0	0	0

The Renault R.S.17 is a Formula One racing car designed and constructed by the Renault Sport Formula One Team to compete during the 2017 Formula One season. The chassis was designed by Nick Chester, Chris Cooney, Martin Tolliday, Pierre Genon and Jon Tomlinson with Bob Bell overseeing the design and production of the car as chief technical officer and Rémi Taffin leading the powertrain design. The Renault R.S.17 was the first car designed under Renault's direction since the R31 in 2011.

The car was initially driven by Nico Hülkenberg and Jolyon Palmer. Hülkenberg joined the team after Kevin Magnussen left the team at the end of the 2016 season, while Palmer was replaced by Carlos Sainz Jr. from the 2017 United States Grand Prix onwards. The R.S.17 made its competitive début at the 2017 Australian Grand Prix.

The R.S.17 was the first Renault F1 car featured with a shark fin since the R30 in 2010.

== Competition history ==
Hülkenberg scored points eight times, but retired on six occasions. His best result was 6th place in Spain, Great Britain, Belgium and Abu Dhabi.

Palmer struggled to score any points until the chaotic Singapore Grand Prix, where he scored a career-best 6th place and eight Championship points. Sainz's first drive for the team saw him finish in 7th place. The team finished the season in 6th place in the constructors' standings, scoring 57 points. This result was considerably stronger than the previous year, where the team scored a mere 8 points.

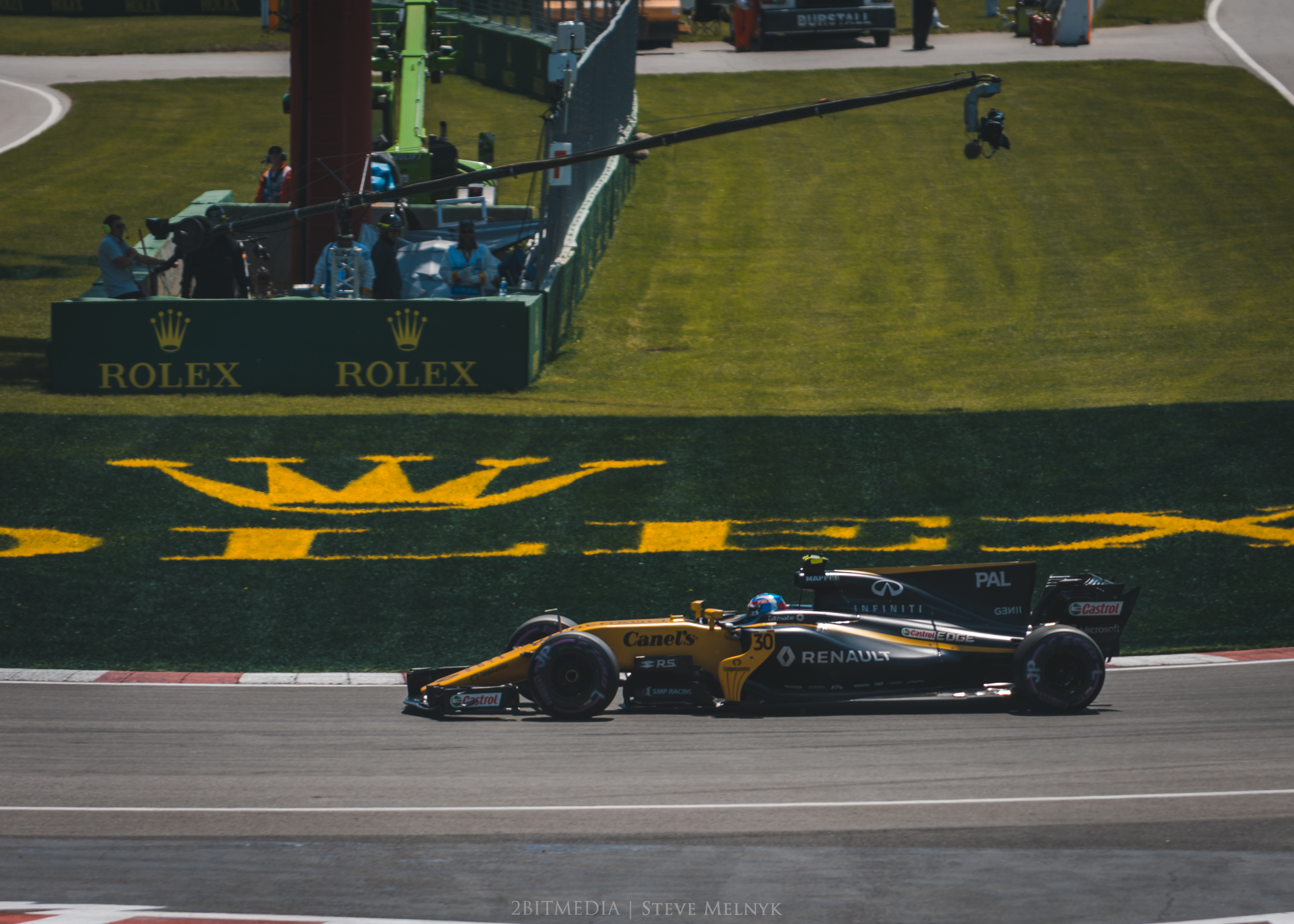
Jolyon Palmer driving the R.S.17 at the Canadian Grand Prix

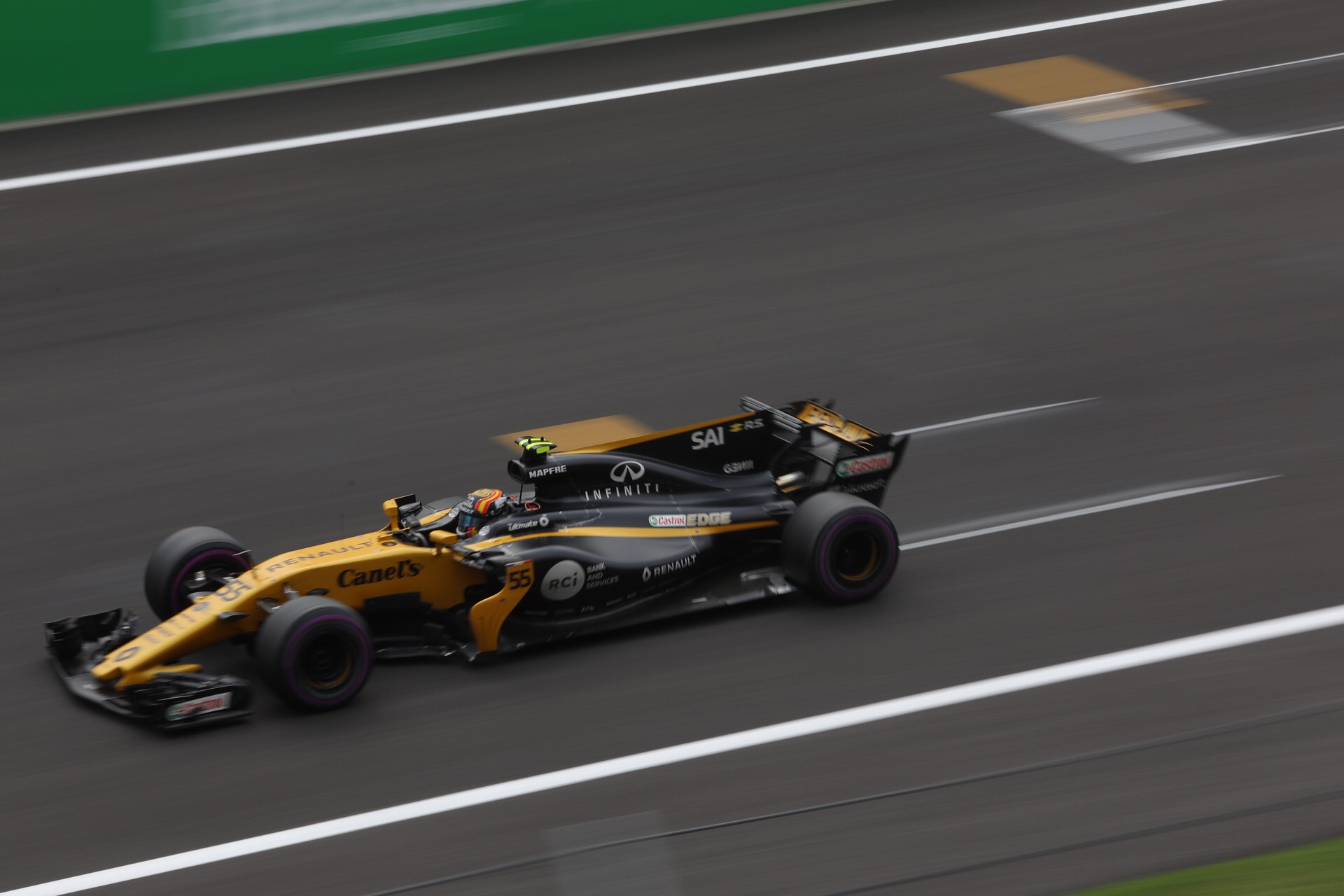
Sainz at the Mexican Grand Prix

== Livery ==
In Monaco, the team celebrated the 40th anniversary of Star Wars. At the United States Grand Prix, the car had pink sidepods and a pink stripe on the fin to raise awareness of breast cancer.

== Complete Formula One results ==
Year	Entrant	Engine	Tyres	Drivers	Grands Prix																				Points	WCC
Year	Entrant	Engine	Tyres	Drivers	AUS	CHN	BHR	RUS	ESP	MON	CAN	AZE	AUT	GBR	HUN	BEL	ITA	SIN	MAL	JPN	USA	MEX	BRA	ABU	Points	WCC
2017	Renault Sport Formula One Team	Renault R.E. 17	P																							
2017	Renault Sport Formula One Team	Renault R.E. 17	P	Nico Hülkenberg	11	12	9	8	6	Ret	8	Ret	13	6	17†	6	13	Ret	16	Ret	Ret	Ret	10	6	57	6th
2017	Renault Sport Formula One Team	Renault R.E. 17	P	Jolyon Palmer	Ret	13	13	Ret	15	11	11	Ret	11	DNS	12	13	Ret	6	15	12					57	6th
2017	Renault Sport Formula One Team	Renault R.E. 17	P	Carlos Sainz Jr.																	7	Ret	11	Ret	57	6th

Notes

- † – Driver failed to finish the race, but was classified as they had completed greater than 90% of the race distance.
