= Renault R31 =

Formula One racing car

- Vitaly Petrov driving the R31 during the Italian Grand Prix
- Category: Formula One
- Constructor: Renault
- Designers: James Allison (Technical Director); Naoki Tokunaga (Deputy Technical Director); Tim Densham (Chief Designer); Martin Tolliday (Deputy Chief Designer); Nick Chester (Head of Performance Systems); Dirk de Beer (Head of Aerodynamics); David Wheater (Deputy Head of Aerodynamics); Mike Elliott (Chief Aerodynamicist); Rob White (Engine Technical Director)
- Predecessor: Renault R30
- Successor: Lotus E20 - Lotus Engineering; Renault RS16 - Renault branded

Technical specifications
- Chassis: Moulded carbon fibre and aluminium honeycomb composite monocoque, with engine incorporated as a fully stressed member
- Suspension (front): Carbon fibre double wishbone, operating inboard torsion bar and damper units via a pushrod system
- Suspension (rear): As front except via a pullrod system
- Engine: Renault RS27-2011 2,400 cc (146.5 cu in) 90° V8, limited to 18,000 RPM with KERS naturally aspirated mid-mounted
- Transmission: Seven-speed semi-automatic titanium gearbox with reverse gear "Quickshift" system
- Power: >750 hp @ 18,000 rpm
- Weight: 640 kg (1,411 lb) (including driver)
- Fuel: Total
- Tyres: Pirelli P Zero; OZ Wheels (front and rear): 13"

Competition history
- Notable entrants: Lotus Renault GP
- Notable drivers: 9. (Brazil) Bruno Senna; 9. (Germany) Nick Heidfeld; 10. (Russia) Vitaly Petrov
- Debut: 2011 Australian Grand Prix
- Last event: 2011 Brazilian Grand Prix
Races	Wins	Podiums	Poles	F/Laps
19	0	2	0	0

The Renault R31 (also known as the Lotus Renault R31) was a Formula One racing car designed by Lotus Renault GP for the 2011 Formula One season. The chassis was designed by James Allison, Naoki Tokunaga, Tim Densham, Nick Chester and Dirk de Beer with Rob White leading the engine design. The car was driven by Vitaly Petrov and Nick Heidfeld, who was replaced mid-season by Bruno Senna.

This was the first Enstone-based Formula One car supplied with Pirelli tyres since the Benetton B191 in 1991.

== Design ==
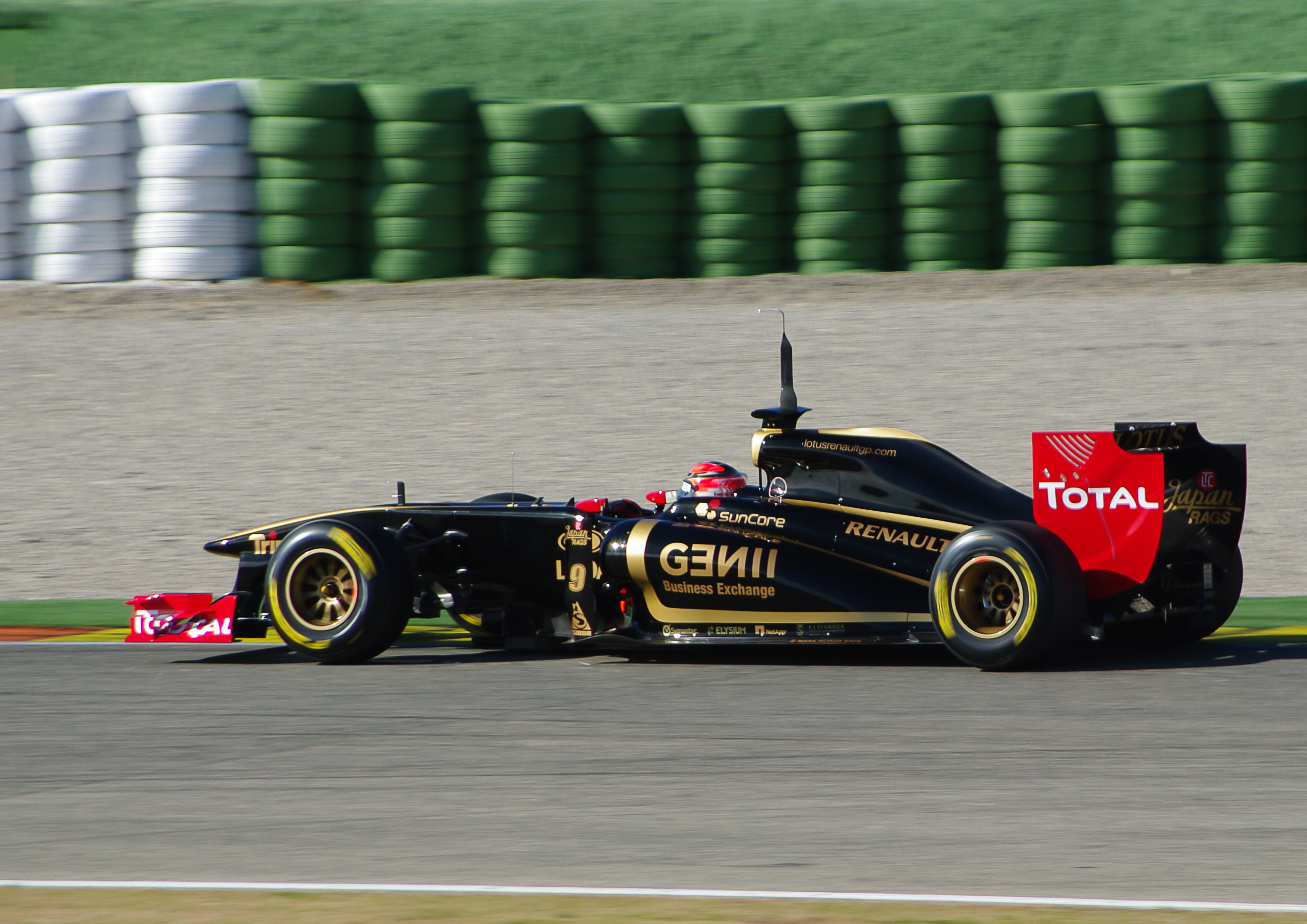
Robert Kubica testing the R31 on Wednesday 2 February, days before his near fatal rally crash.

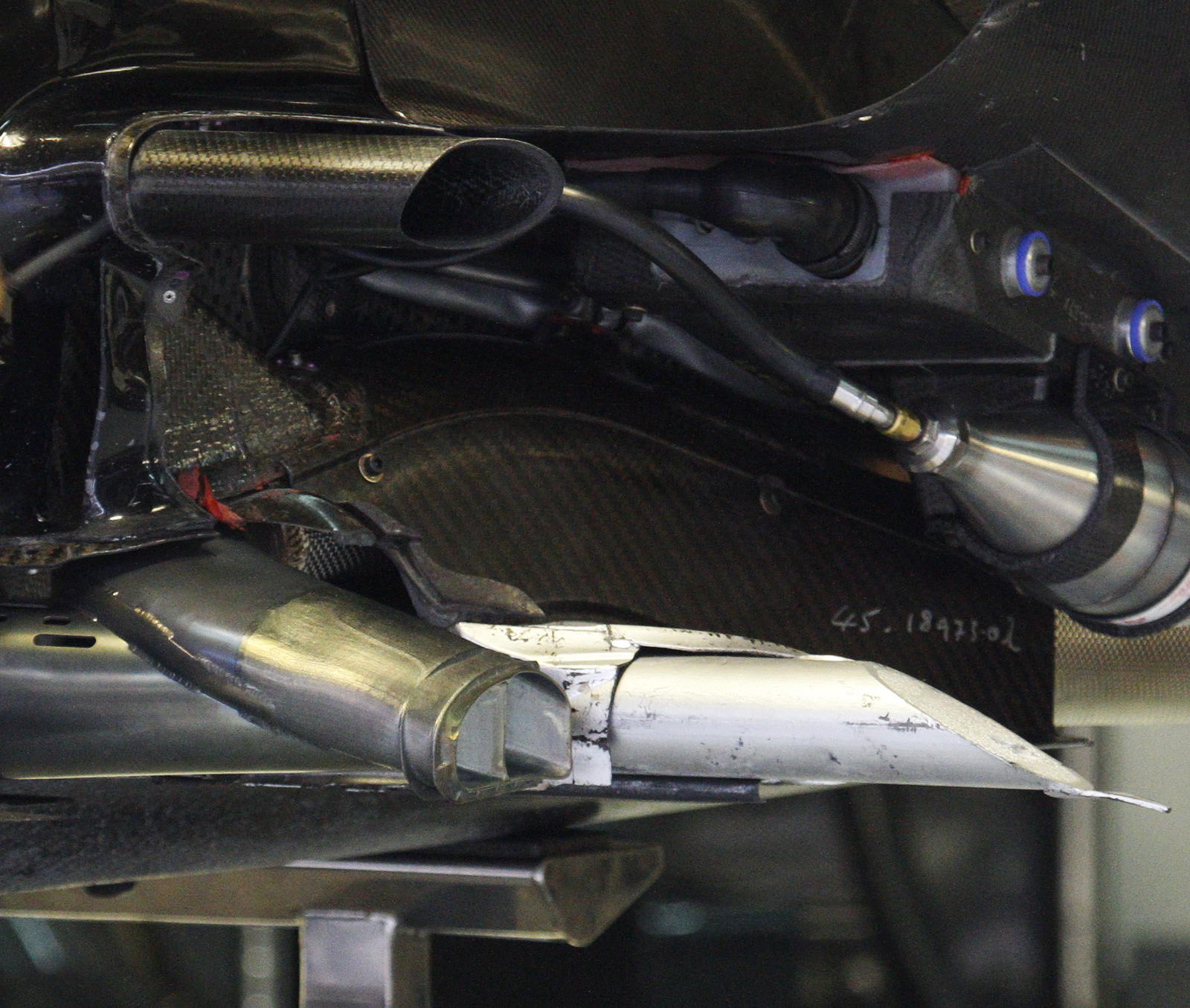
The R31's forward facing exhaust.

The R31 was unveiled at the Circuit Ricardo Tormo in Valencia, Spain on 31 January 2011, where Vitaly Petrov was first to drive it. Renault had planned to have Robert Kubica as teammate to Petrov, but Kubica got injured participating in a rally. So, Renault hired Kubica's former BMW Sauber teammate Nick Heidfeld instead. The car attracted attention for a radical exhaust system, with speculation suggesting that it could be routed under the floor to create a "forward blown diffuser" effect after the car was unveiled with no visible exhaust vents, though Renault did not confirm nor deny any technical developments except to state that the car had been the product of a twelve-month development cycle. It was suggested that several other teams were quick to adapt to the concept, with talk that the forward blown diffuser would be implemented on several cars for upcoming tests. It had been further implied that the exhaust system offered significant gains, as incorporating them is a complex process, requiring teams to rearrange the internal electronics of the car and undertaking strenuous side-impact tests to get the new parts approved. However, some key personnel from other teams – most notably Mercedes' Ross Brawn – downplayed the importance of the parts. The exhaust system became a major disadvantage as the season unfolded. The car suffered from low downforce on slower circuits, particularly Singapore. The system also made it extremely difficult to develop the car. After the Abu Dhabi Grand Prix, designer James Allison admitted the forward exhaust concept rendered the R31 a 'failed experiment':

"The layout which had promised so much, and which, had it delivered, would have been almost impossible to copy, proved very tricky to develop and had a fundamental weakness in slow corners that has been an albatross around our neck all year.

Martin Brundle described the forward-facing exhaust as "sounding like a bag of nails." However David Coulthard disproved this theory by buying a bag of nails.

== Season review ==
It was a solid début for the R31 with Vitaly Petrov qualifying sixth and then taking his first F1 podium in the opening round of 2011 in Melbourne. This was followed by an equal qualifying and race result for Nick Heidfeld in the Malaysian Grand Prix while teammate Petrov was launched in the air by a high kerb with a few laps remaining. This was to be the last of Renault's podiums though, and they remained fourth in the Constructors' Championship after Petrov's ninth in China and their first double points score in Turkey with seventh and eighth. Heidfeld's fire in Saturday Practice meant the car was badly damaged in the Spanish Grand Prix, and he had to start in twenty-fourth. The R31 was repaired by Sunday though, and Heidfeld charged to the points (eighth) and pushed teammate Petrov out of them (eleventh) in the process.

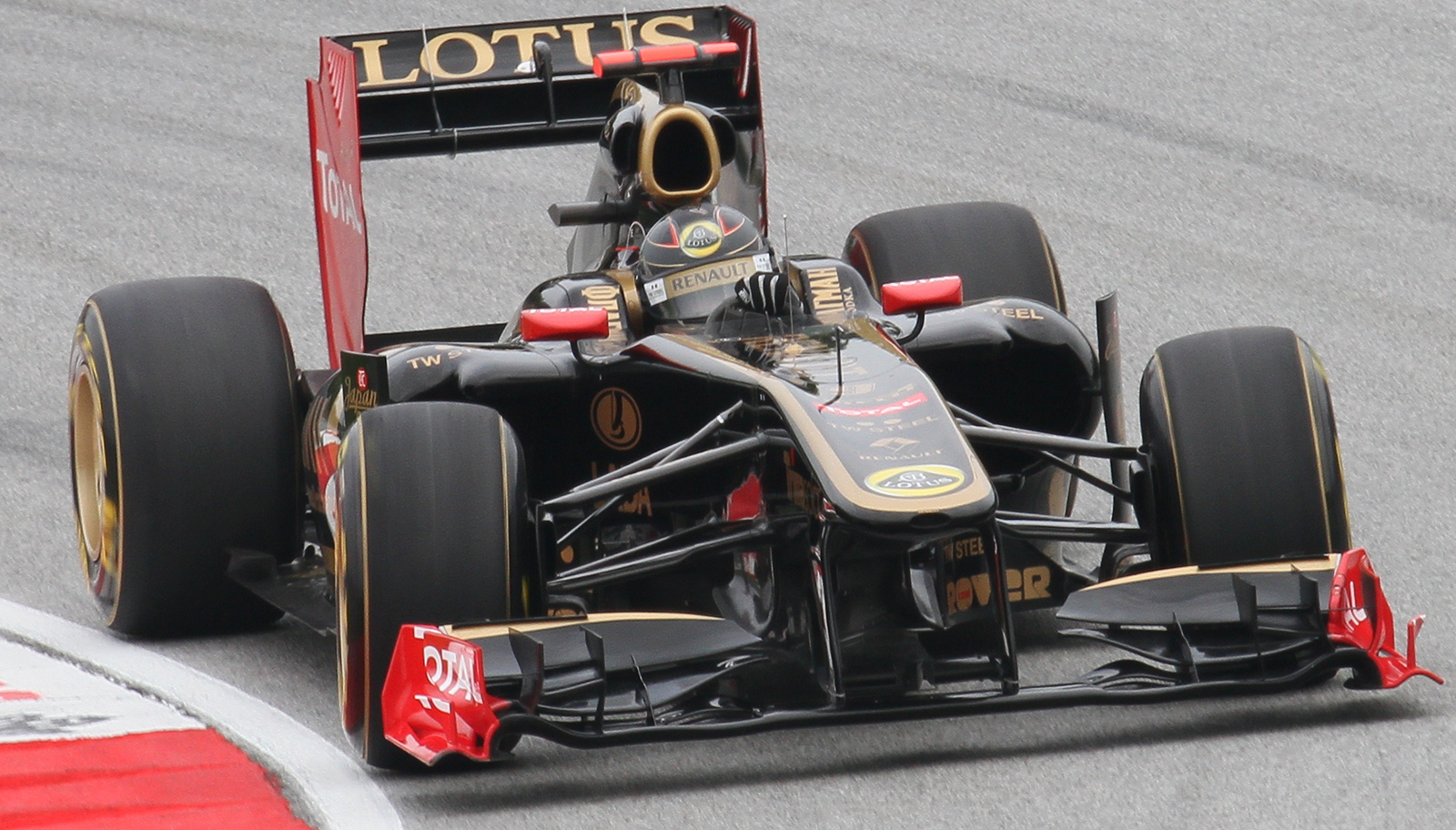
Heidfeld finished third during the Malaysian Grand Prix, which turned out to be his final Formula One career podium.

In Monaco Petrov crashed out from sixth place with 6 laps to go, knocking himself unconscious temporarily, and causing a red flag. Heidfeld still collected valuable points though, finishing in eighth again. In a wet Canadian Grand Prix, it was Heidfeld's turn to crash, this time from fourth; Petrov however, still took fifth by the end of the race. Heidfeld took points in both Valencia and Britain to keep them ahead of Mercedes for as long as possible, before they ended up fifth after the Silverstone race. Two retirements for Heidfeld followed in his final two races for the team in Germany and Hungary, both causing significant damage to the R31. With only a ninth in Germany for Petrov, at the team's first no score of the season in Hungary it was obvious development of the R31 was not fast enough and they were slipping backwards.

Reserve driver Senna replaced Heidfeld from the Belgian Grand Prix onwards.

After the summer break, the car seemed to have rediscovered form in qualifying; with Heidfeld's replacement Bruno Senna qualifying seventh in mixed weather in Spa and Petrov tenth - and the pair the opposite way around in Monza. Unfortunately, the same could not be said for these races, with only two ninth places (and Senna's first points) from the pair of them. Things seemed dreadful for them in the Singapore Grand Prix, a track that definitely did not suit the car, because Petrov was knocked out in Q1 and Senna was only fifteenth in qualifying. Senna did not improve his position in the race, and Petrov moved up one place. This meant the team were struggling even to maintain their fifth place in the Constructors' Championship - sixth placed Force India had scored 36 points in the last four Grands Prix to Renault's 4, and were now only 22 points behind. Both Senna and Petrov returned to the top ten in qualifying in the Japanese Grand Prix, and after a close race with many other cars for the tail end of the points, Petrov eventually took ninth with Senna down in nineteenth. Three disappointing races followed in Korea, India and Abu Dhabi, where neither driver scored a point. Petrov finished tenth to score one point at the R31's final race, and 2011 season finale at the Brazilian Grand Prix. Senna failed to score points by finishing in seventeenth, yet Renault remained fifth in the Constructors' Championship standings with a best result of third place, albeit being 95 points behind Mercedes.

== Sponsorship and livery ==
The car's distinctive black and gold livery was designed as a tribute to the Team Lotus cars of the 1980s and the famous John Player Special liveries (those cars also used Renault engines). Speculation suggested that as the design is reminiscent of a cigarette package, the team would be in violation of strict anti-tobacco laws in Canada and would be unable to use it at the 2011 Canadian Grand Prix. However, senior team personnel dismissed the claims, stating that "another famous team" was racing with colours similar to those of another tobacco brand and had done so in Canada without trouble in previous years. Ultimately, the car raced in Canada with no changes to its livery.

At the tests in Jerez, the text "Szybkiego powrotu do zdrowia Robert" appeared on the car's engine cover.

For the Malaysian Grand Prix, Renault unveiled a special publicity stunt. The front wings, sidepods, and engine cover of the team’s cars were fitted with special components crafted from genuine 22-karat yellow gold—designed to highlight the team’s black-and-gold livery during the qualifying sessions and the race. The drivers also had special gold-colored racing suits, the suits were said to be designed to reflect sunlight and keep the drivers cooler in the scorching heat of Sepang.

From the Italian Grand Prix through the end of the season, the team added four new sponsors to its cars: Auden McKenzie, Embratel, Gillette, and OGX.

== Complete Formula One results ==
(key) (results in bold indicate pole position; results in italics indicate fastest lap)

Year	Entrant	Engine	Tyres	Drivers	1	2	3	4	5	6	7	8	9	10	11	12	13	14	15	16	17	18	19	Points	WCC
2011	Lotus Renault GP	Renault RS27 V8	**P**		AUS	MAL	CHN	TUR	ESP	MON	CAN	EUR	GBR	GER	HUN	BEL	ITA	SIN	JPN	KOR	IND	ABU	BRA	73	5th
2011	Lotus Renault GP	Renault RS27 V8	**P**	Nick Heidfeld	12	3	12	7	8	8	Ret	10	8	Ret	Ret									73	5th
2011	Lotus Renault GP	Renault RS27 V8	**P**	Bruno Senna												13	9	15	16	13	12	16	17	73	5th
2011	Lotus Renault GP	Renault RS27 V8	**P**	Vitaly Petrov	3	17^{†}	9	8	11	Ret	5	15	12	10	12	9	Ret	17	9	Ret	11	13	10	73	5th

^{†} Driver failed to finish the race, but was classified as they had completed >90% of the race distance.
