= Lotus E21 =

Formula One racing car

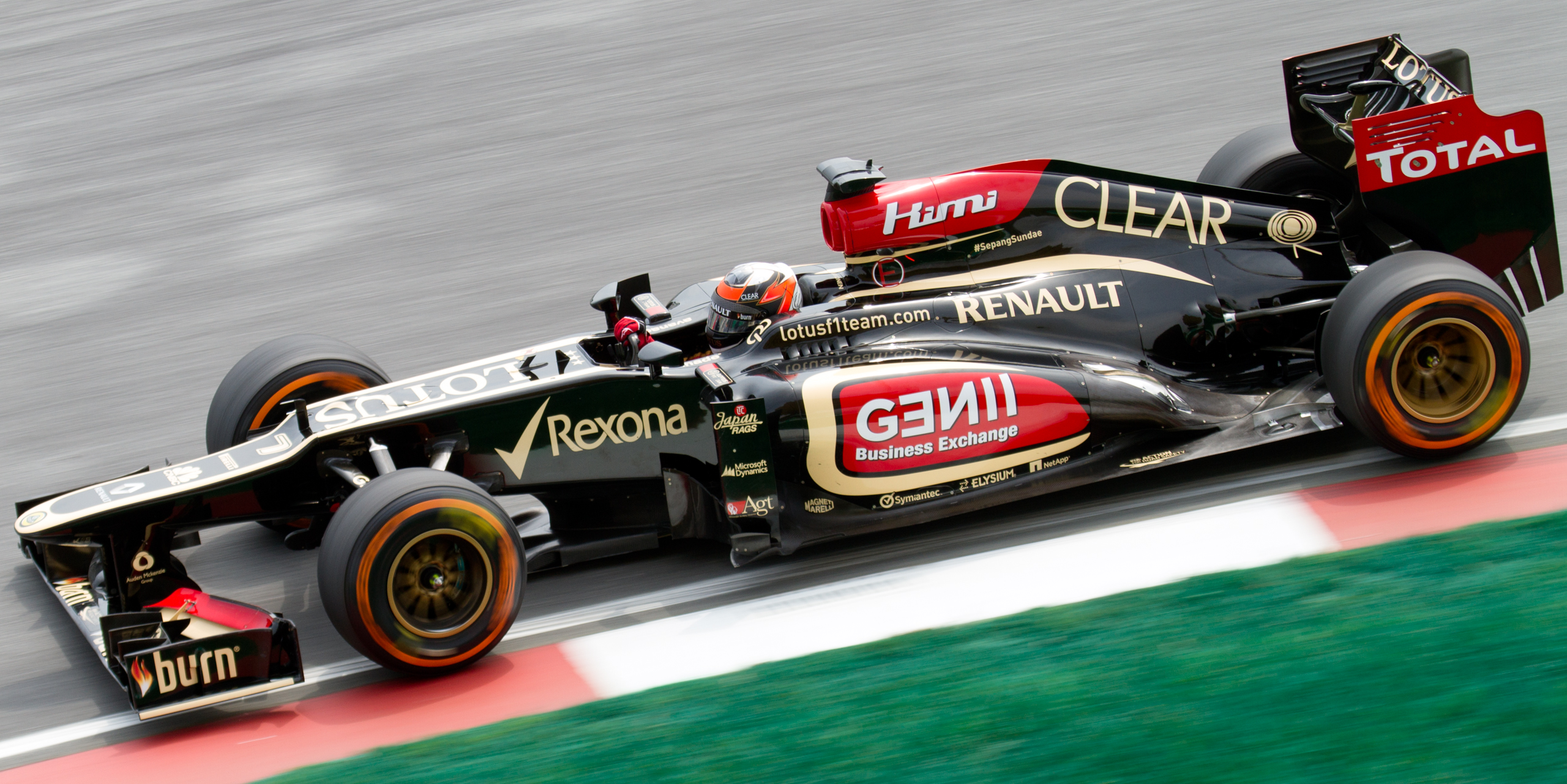
- Kimi Räikkönen driving the E21 during the free practice session at the Malaysian Grand Prix
- Category: Formula One
- Constructor: Lotus
- Designers: James Allison (Technical Director); Nick Chester (Deputy Technical Director); Martin Tolliday (Chief Designer); Simon Virrill (Deputy Chief Designer); Daniele Casanova (Head of Performance Systems); Dirk de Beer (Head of Aerodynamics); David Wheater (Deputy Head of Aerodynamics)
- Predecessor: Lotus E20
- Successor: Lotus E22

Technical specifications
- Chassis: Moulded carbon fibre and aluminium honeycomb composite monocoque, manufactured by Lotus F1 Team and designed for maximum strength with minimum weight. Installing the engine as a fully stressed member.
- Suspension (front): Carbon fibre top and bottom wishbones operate an inboard rocker via a pushrod system. This is connected to a torsion bar and damper units which are mounted inside the front of the monocoque.
- Suspension (rear): Carbon fibre top and bottom wishbones with pull rod operated torsion springs and transverse-mounted damper units mounted in the top of the gearbox casing.
- Engine: Renault RS27-2013 2.4 L (146 cu in) V8 (90°). Naturally aspirated, 18,000 RPM limited with KERS, mid-mounted.
- Transmission: Lotus 7-speed semi-automatic sequential titanium gearbox + 1 reverse.
- Power: 750 hp (560 kW) @ 18,000 rpm
- Weight: 642 kg (1,415.4 lb), with driver, cameras and ballast
- Fuel: Total; Kevlar-reinforced rubber fuel cell by ATL.
- Tyres: Pirelli P Zero (dry), Cinturato (wet); OZ Wheels (front and rear): 13"

Competition history
- Notable entrants: Lotus F1 Team
- Notable drivers: 7. (Finland) Kimi Räikkönen; 7. (Finland) Heikki Kovalainen; 8. (France) Romain Grosjean
- Debut: 2013 Australian Grand Prix
- First win: 2013 Australian Grand Prix
- Last win: 2013 Australian Grand Prix
- Last event: 2013 Brazilian Grand Prix
Races	Wins	Podiums	Poles	F/Laps
19	1	14	0	2

The Lotus E21 is a Formula One racing car designed and built by the Lotus F1 team for use in the 2013 championship. The chassis was designed by James Allison, Nick Chester, Martin Tolliday, Daniele Casanova and Dirk de Beer with Renault supplying the team's engines. The car was driven by 2007 World Champion Kimi Räikkönen and Romain Grosjean, both of whom remained with the team after competing in 2012. The E21 was the first of the 2013 season cars to be launched.

== Design ==
Despite the perpetual troubles the team experienced with the "passive Drag Reduction System" device on the E20 chassis, which spent most of the 2012 season in development without ever being raced, the E21 was launched with a passive DRS device of its own.

Following criticism of the cars raced in 2012 for being "ugly" because of a visible step in the design of the nose, the 2013 technical regulations allowed teams to use a "modesty panel", or a small piece of carbon fibre designed to cover the nose of the car for aesthetic purposes. However, the E21 was launched without a modesty panel, as the team felt that it offered no aerodynamic benefit, and that the aesthetic qualities it offered were not worth the added weight, however slight the weight gain might be.

== Season summary ==
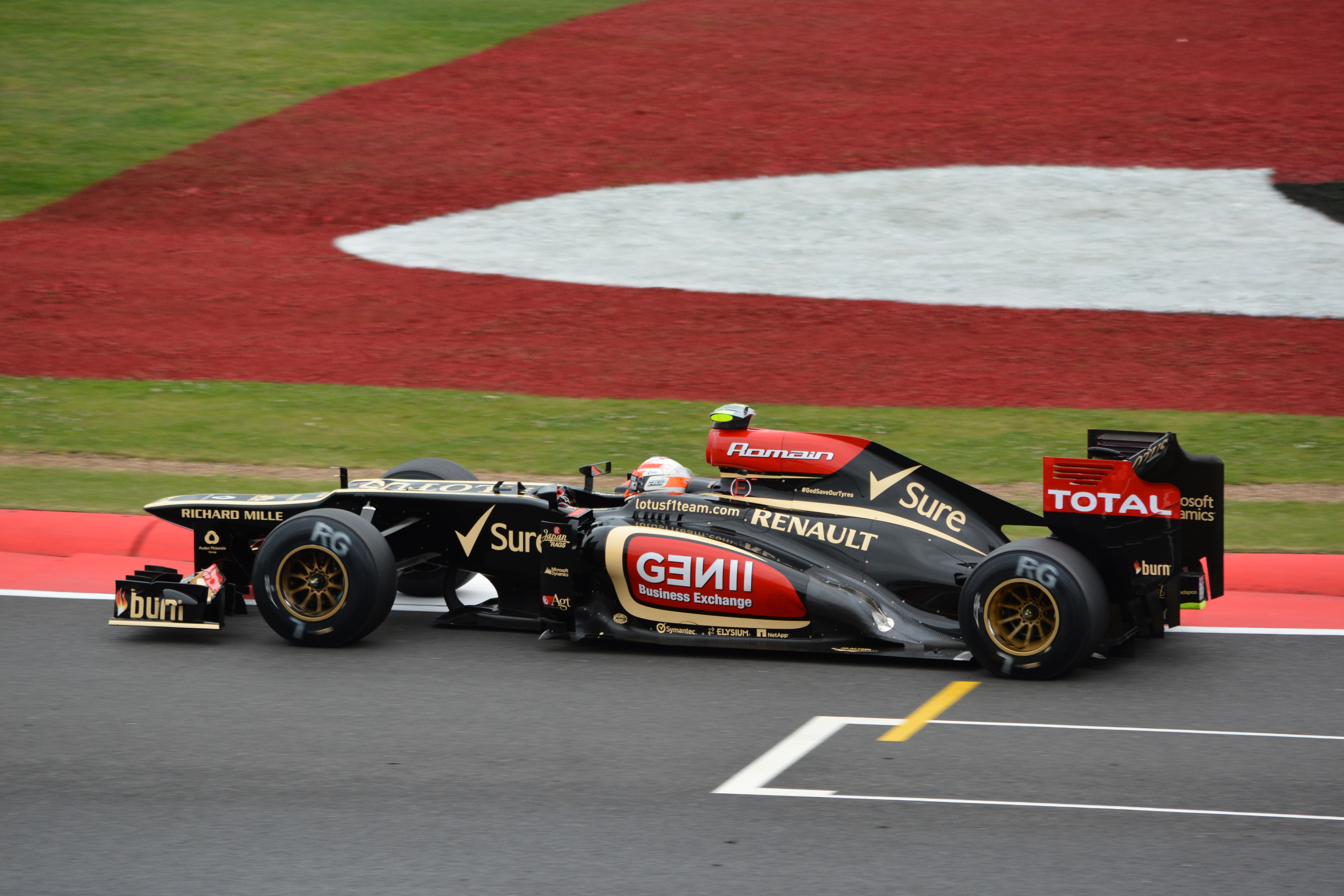
Romain Grosjean driving the E21 at the British Grand Prix

The E21 proved to be a competitive car across the 2013 season with one victory at the season opener at Australia, and the car would claim 14 podiums by the end of the season. Eventually, the team finished 4th in the Constructors' Championship with 315 points.

== Sponsorship and livery ==
Lotus went into the 2013 season with subtle livery changes. While the overall design was similar, the only difference was additional red accents.

At the Chinese Grand Prix, the "Renault" branding traditionally seen on the sides of the car and on the engine cover was replaced with the Chinese characters 雷诺. In Monaco, the team collaborated with Daft Punk to promote their latest album, Random Access Memories. The Daft Punk logo appeared on the rear wing, while the chassis sported their helmet designs as they appear on the album cover on each side of the car. In Korea, the Renault logos were badged as Renault Samsung. At the United States and Brazilian Grands Prix, the Expo 2020 logo was seen on the sides of the cars.

The car also notably featured a different hashtag at every race, often referencing food of the visited country or other pop culture elements through puns. In pre-season testing in Jerez, the hashtag was "#SexyAndIKnowIt". In Australia, the hashtag was "#WeMissedYou". In Malaysia, the hashtag was "#SepangSundae". In China, the hashtag was "#F1Fortunecookie". In Bahrain, the hashtag was "#LongerLastingRubber". In Spanish, the hashtag was "#CatchTheBull". In Monaco, the hashtag was "#GetLucky". In Canada, the hashtag was "#PunchLine". In British, the hashtag was "#GodSaveOurTyres". In German, the hashtag was "#EinsZweiDrive". In Hungary, the hashtag was "#HungaroKings". In Belgium, the hashtag was "#SPArtacus". In Monza, the hashtag was "#Monzarella". In Singapore, the hashtag was "#ExplicitContent". In Korea, the hashtag was "#UpForAFreeRide". In Japanese, the hashtag was "#TrackOfTheRisingFun". In India, the hashtag was "#ChicaneTandoori". In Abu Dhabi, to tie in with the Halloween festivities, the hashtag was "#AlloWin?" with a pumpkin design, referring to a pun in french: "Allô Win? Ici Trouille!". In United States, the hashtag was "#GetWellSoonKimi". In Brazil, the hashtag was "#FullBrazilian".

== Complete Formula One results ==
(key) (results in bold indicate pole position; results in italics indicate fastest lap)

Year	Entrant	Engine	Tyres	Drivers	Grands Prix																			Points	WCC
Year	Entrant	Engine	Tyres	Drivers	AUS	MAL	CHN	BHR	ESP	MON	CAN	GBR	GER	HUN	BEL	ITA	SIN	KOR	JPN	IND	ABU	USA	BRA	Points	WCC
2013	Lotus F1 Team	Renault RS27-2013	**P**	Kimi Räikkönen	1	7	2	2	2	10	9	5	2	2	Ret	11	3	2	5	7	Ret			315	4th
2013	Lotus F1 Team	Renault RS27-2013	**P**	Heikki Kovalainen																		14	14	315	4th
2013	Lotus F1 Team	Renault RS27-2013	**P**	Romain Grosjean	10	6	9	3	Ret	Ret	13	19†	3	6	8	8	Ret	3	3	3	4	2	Ret	315	4th

^{†} Driver failed to finish the race, but was classified as they had completed greater than 90% of the race distance.
