= Renault RS engine =

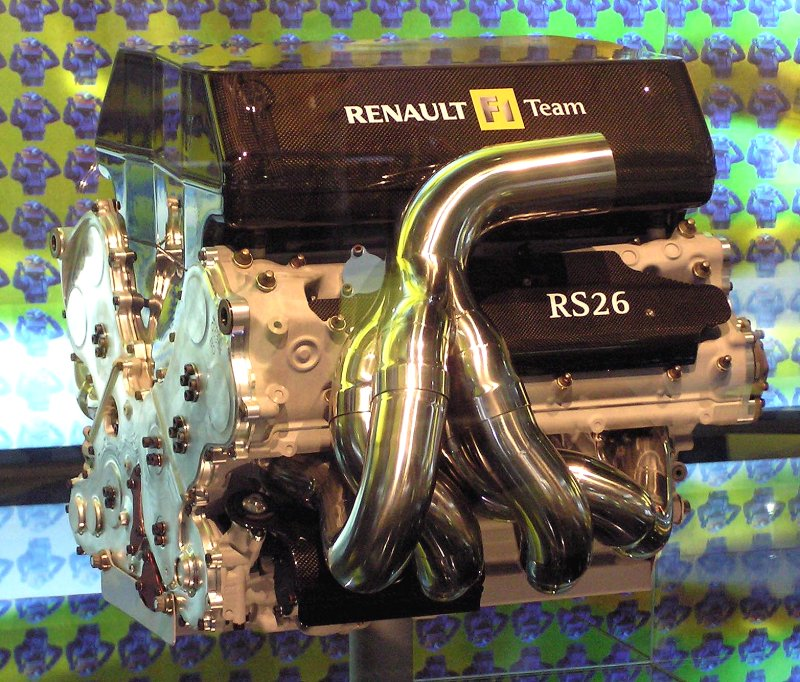

Overview
- Manufacturer: (France) Renault Sport; Mecachrome (1998 only); Playlife (1998–2000); Supertec (1999–2000)
- Designer: Bernard Dudot (RS1–RS9)
- Production: 1989–2013

Layout
- Configuration: 67°/71°/111°/72° V10; 90° V8
- Displacement: 3.5 L (3,498 cc); 3.0 L (2,992 cc); 3.0 L (2,998 cc); 2.4 L (2,398 cc)
- Cylinder bore: 93 mm (3.7 in) (RS3); 94 mm (3.7 in) (RS6); 91 mm (3.6 in) (RS7); 92 mm (3.6 in) (RS8); 93.5 mm (3.7 in) (RS9); 95 mm (3.7 in) (RS22); 98 mm (3.9 in) (RS25)
- Piston stroke: 51.5 mm (2.0 in) (RS3); 50.4 mm (2.0 in) (RS6); 46 mm (1.8 in) (RS7); 45.1 mm (1.8 in) (RS8); 43.67 mm (1.7 in) (RS9); 42.3 mm (1.7 in) (RS22); 39.75 mm (1.6 in) (RS25)

Combustion
- Fuel system: Electronic multi-point indirect fuel injection
- Fuel type: Gasoline
- Cooling system: Water-cooled

Output
- Power output: 650–900 hp (485–671 kW; 659–912 PS)
- Torque output: 221–340 lb⋅ft (300–461 N⋅m)

Dimensions
- Dry weight: 90–141 kg (198.4–310.9 lb)

Chronology
- Predecessor: EF
- Successor: E-Tech

The RS series is a family of naturally-aspirated Grand Prix racing engines, designed, developed and manufactured jointly by Mecachrome and Renault Sport for use in Formula One, and used by Arrows, BAR, Williams, Ligier, Lotus, Caterham, Benetton, Renault, and Red Bull, from 1989 until 2013. The engines came in both the original V10, and later V8 configurations, and engine displacement ranged from 2.4 L (150 cu in) to 3.5 L (210 cu in) over the years. Power figures varied; from 650 hp (480 kW) at 12,500 rpm, to later over 900 hp (670 kW) at 19,000 rpm. The 2.4-litre RS26 V8 engine, used in 2006, is one of the highest revving Formula One engines in history, at 20,500 rpm. Between 1998 and 2000, the RS9 engines were badged as Mecachrome, Supertec, and Playlife.

== Formula One engine specifications ==
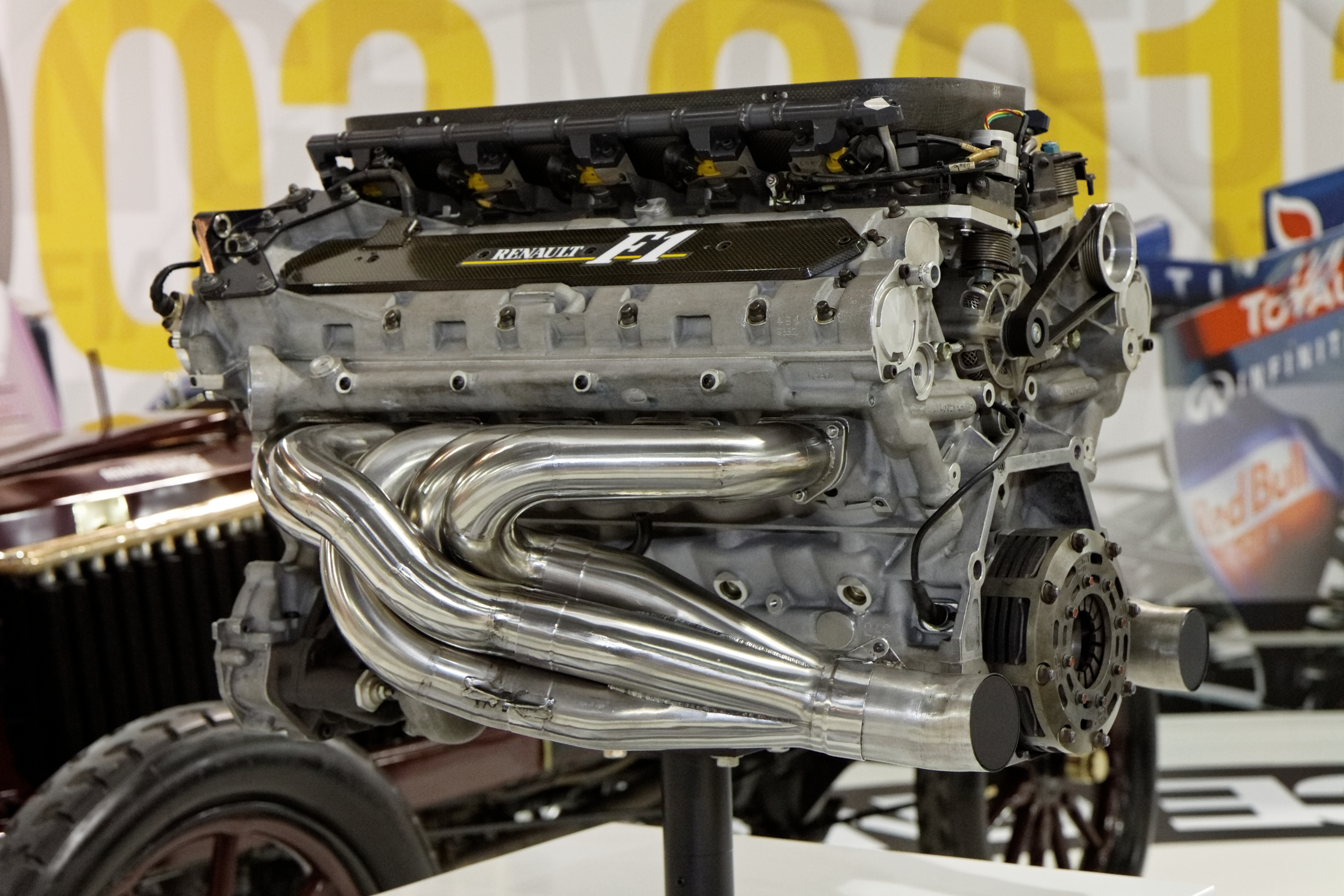
Renault RS2 3.5 V10 engine saw two wins in the Williams FW13B in 1990.

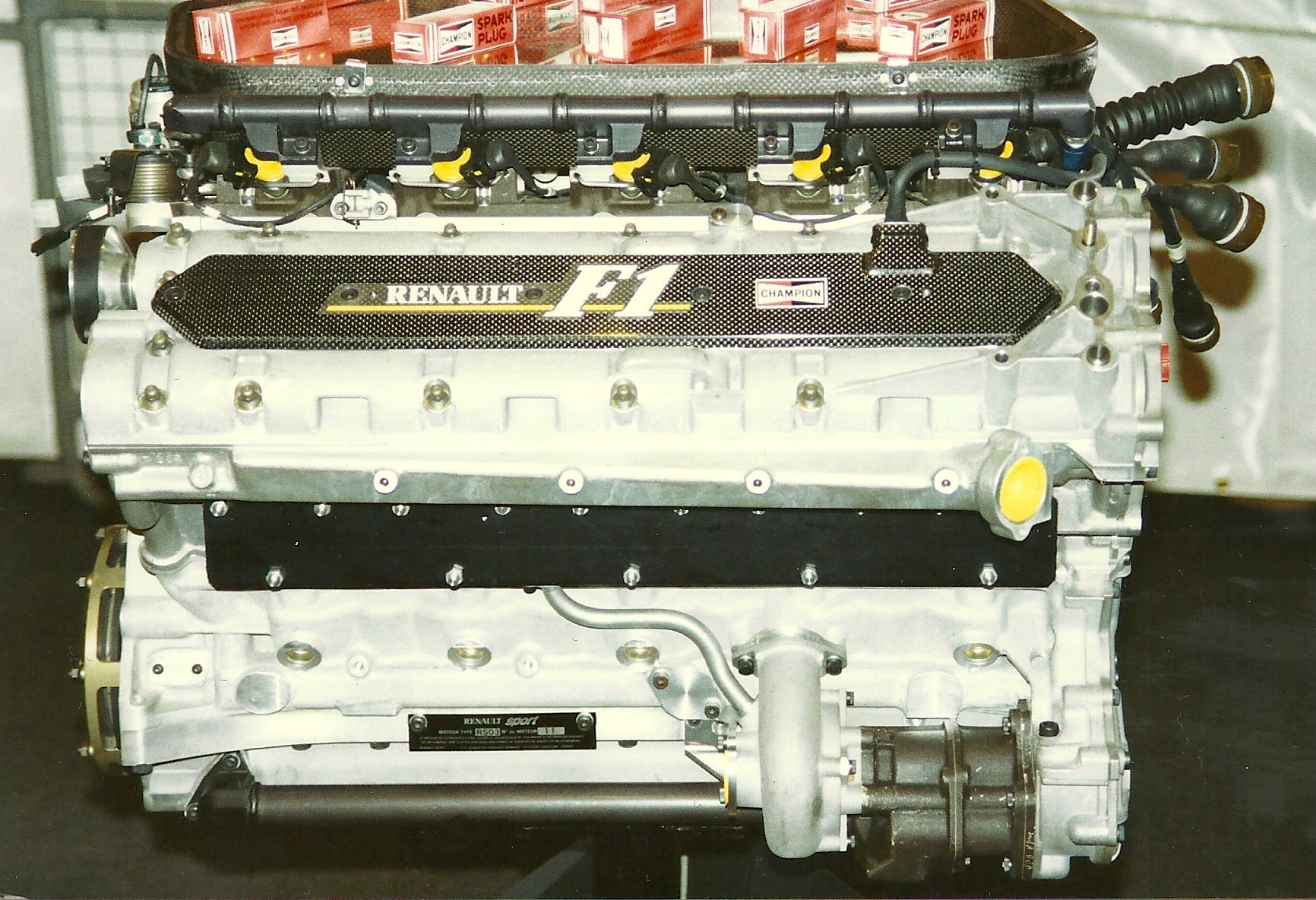
Renault RS3 3.5 V10 engine; used in the Williams FW14 (1991–1992). The RS3 saw Renault's first World Drivers' (Nigel Mansell) and Constructors' Championship (Williams) wins in 1992.

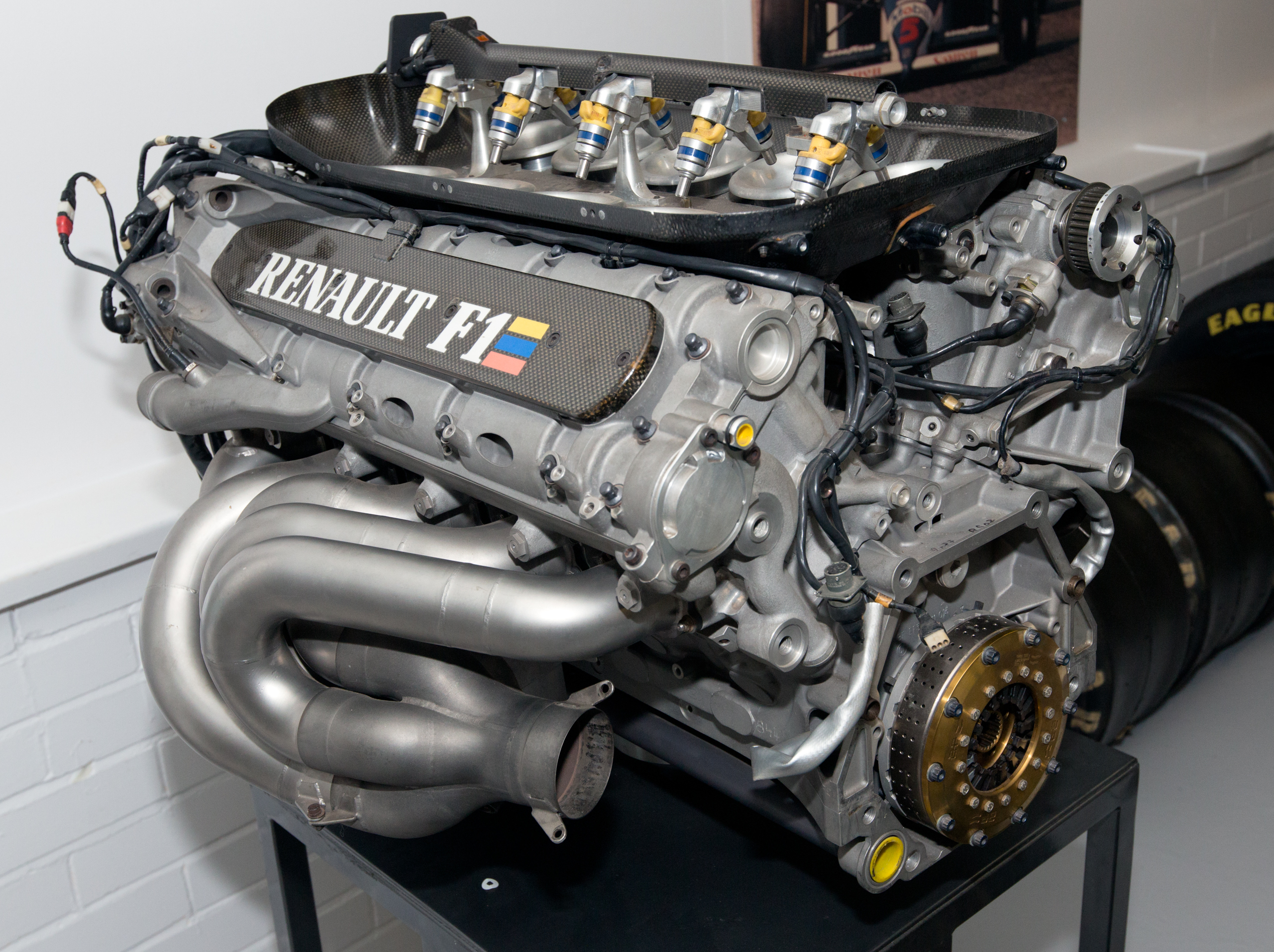
1995 Renault RS7 3.0 V10 engine; used in Williams FW17 and Benetton B195.

=== Naturally-aspirated V10 engines ===
Engine name	Bank angle (°)	Configuration	Displacement (L)	Aspiration	Output	Year	Wins
RS1	67	V10	3.5	Naturally-aspirated	650 hp at 12,500 rpm	1989	CAN, AUS
RS2	67	V10	3.5	Naturally-aspirated	660 hp at 12,800 rpm	1990	SMR, HUN
RS3	67	V10	3.5	Naturally-aspirated	700 hp at 12,500 rpm	1991	MEX, FRA, GBR, GER, ITA, POR, ESP
RS4	67	V10	3.5	Naturally-aspirated	750 hp at 13,000 rpm	1992	RSA, MEX, BRA, ESP, SMR, FRA, GBR, GER, POR, JPN; Nigel Mansell (World Drivers' Championship (WDC)); Williams-Renault (World Constructors' Championship (WCC))
RS5	67	V10	3.5	Naturally-aspirated	760–780 hp at 13,800 rpm	1993	RSA, SMR, ESP, CAN, FRA, GBR, GER, HUN, BEL, ITA; Alain Prost (WDC); Williams-Renault (WCC)
RS6/RS6B/RS6C	67	V10	3.5	Naturally-aspirated	790–830 hp at 14,300 rpm	1994	ESP, GBR, BEL, ITA, POR, JPN, AUS; Williams-Renault (WCC)
RS7	67	V10	3.0	Naturally-aspirated	675–700 hp at 15,200–15,600 rpm	1995	BRA, ARG, SMR, ESP, MON, FRA, GBR, GER, HUN, ITA, EUR, PAC, JPN, AUS; Michael Schumacher (WDC); Benetton-Renault (WCC)
RS8	67	V10	3.0	Naturally-aspirated	700–760 hp at 14,500–16,000 rpm	1996	AUS, BRA, ARG, EUR, SMR, CAN, FRA, GBR, GER, HUN, POR, JPN; Damon Hill (WDC); Williams-Renault (WCC)
RS9	71	V10	3.0	Naturally-aspirated	730–760 hp at 14,600–16,000 rpm	1997	BRA, ARG, SMR, ESP, GBR, GER, HUN, AUT, LUX; Jacques Villeneuve (WDC); Williams-Renault (WCC)
Mecachrome/Playlife GC37-01 (Renault RS9)	71	V10	3.0	Naturally-aspirated	750–775 hp at 14,000–15,600 rpm	1998	N/A
Supertec/Playlife FB01 (Renault RS9)	71	V10	3.0	Naturally-aspirated	750–780 hp at 14,000–15,800 rpm	1999	N/A
Supertec/Playlife FB02 (Renault RS9)	71	V10	3.0	Naturally-aspirated	780 hp at 15,800 rpm	2000	N/A
RS21	111	V10	3.0	Naturally-aspirated	780 hp at 17,400 rpm	2001	N/A
RS22	111	V10	3.0	Naturally-aspirated	825 hp at 17,500 rpm	2002	N/A
RS23	111	V10	3.0	Naturally-aspirated	830–850 hp at 18,000 rpm	2003	HUN
RS24	72	V10	3.0	Naturally-aspirated	880–900 hp at 19,000 rpm	2004	MON
RS25/RS25B/RS25C/RS25D/RS25E	72	V10	3.0	Naturally-aspirated	900+ hp at 19,000 rpm	2005	AUS, MAL, BAH, SMR, EUR, FRA, GER, CHN; Fernando Alonso (WDC); Renault (WCC)

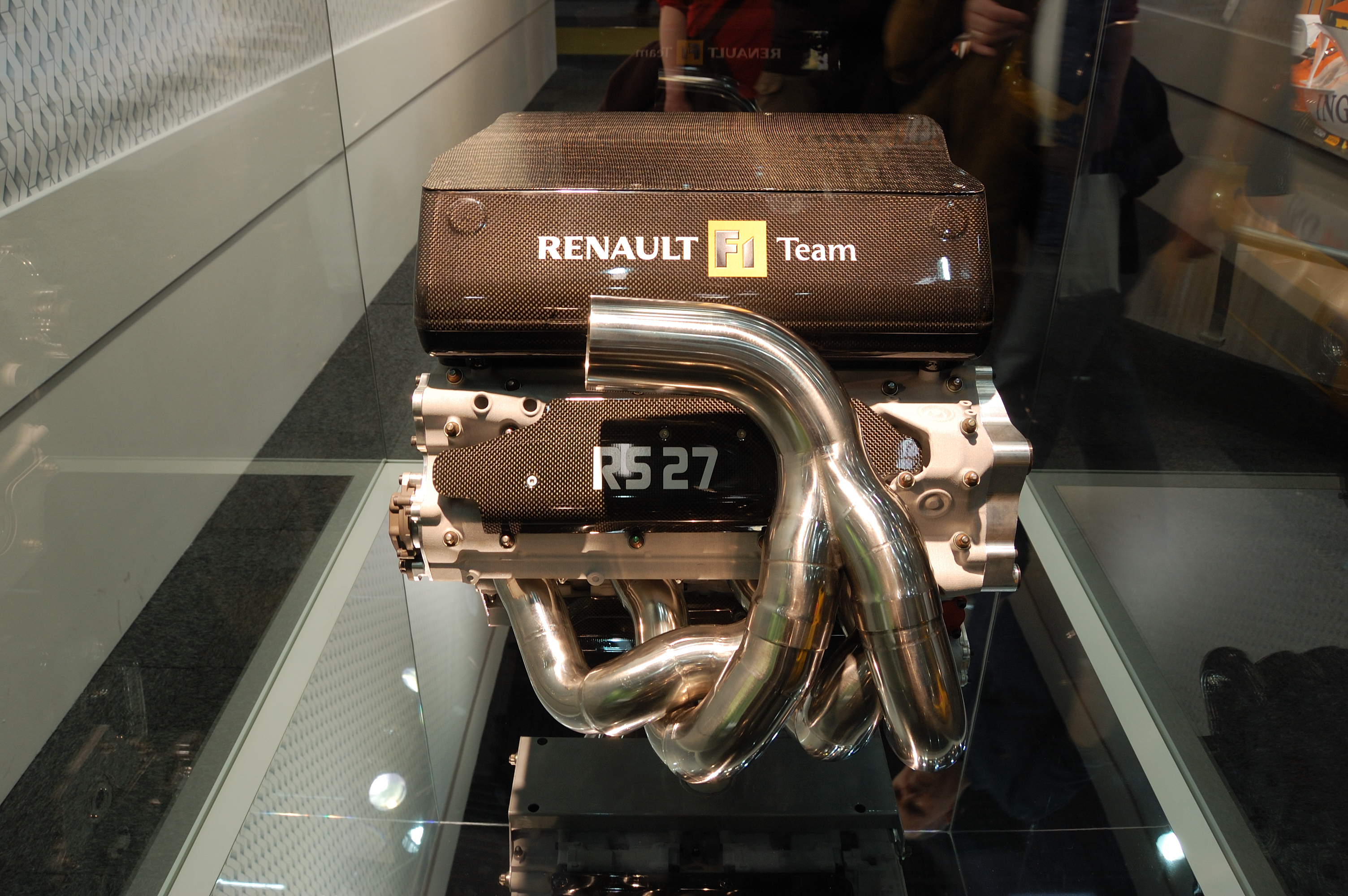
Renault RS27

=== Naturally-aspirated V8 engines ===
Engine name	Bank angle (°)	Configuration	Displacement (L)	Aspiration	Output	Year	Wins
RS26	90	V8	2.4	Naturally-aspirated	775–800 hp at 20500 rpm	2006	Fernando Alonso (World Drivers' Championship) Renault (World Constructors' Championship)
RS27	90	V8	2.4	Naturally-aspirated	770 hp at 19000 rpm	2007	N/A
RS27	90	V8	2.4	Naturally-aspirated	>770 hp at 19000 rpm	2008	N/A
RS27	90	V8	2.4	Naturally-aspirated	>750 hp at 18000 rpm	2009	N/A
RS27	90	V8	2.4	Naturally-aspirated	>750 hp at 18000 rpm	2010	Sebastian Vettel (World Drivers' Championship) Red Bull-Renault (World Constructors' Championship)
RS27	90	V8	2.4	Naturally-aspirated	>750 hp at 18000 rpm	2011	Sebastian Vettel (World Drivers' Championship) Red Bull-Renault (World Constructors' Championship)
RS27	90	V8	2.4	Naturally-aspirated	>750 hp at 18000 rpm	2012	Sebastian Vettel (World Drivers' Championship) Red Bull-Renault (World Constructors' Championship)
RS27	90	V8	2.4	Naturally-aspirated	>750 hp at 18000 rpm	2013	Sebastian Vettel (World Drivers' Championship) Red Bull-Renault (World Constructors' Championship)

== Applications ==
=== Formula One racing cars ===
==== Badged as Renault ====
- Williams FW12C
- Williams FW13
- Williams FW14
- Williams FW14B
- Williams FW15C
- Williams FW16
- Williams FW17
- Williams FW18
- Williams FW19
- Benetton B195
- Benetton B196
- Benetton B197
- Benetton B201
- Renault R202
- Renault R23
- Renault R24
- Renault R25
- Renault R26
- Renault R27
- Renault R28
- Renault R29
- Renault R30
- Renault R31
- Lotus T128
- Lotus E20
- Lotus E21
- Red Bull RB3
- Red Bull RB4
- Red Bull RB5
- Red Bull RB6
- Red Bull RB7
- Red Bull RB8
- Red Bull RB9
- Ligier JS37
- Ligier JS39
- Caterham CT01
- Caterham CT03

==== Badged as Mecachrome ====
- Williams FW20

==== Badged as Supertec ====
- Williams FW21
- Arrows A21
- BAR 01

==== Badged as Playlife ====
- Benetton B198
- Benetton B199
- Benetton B200

=== Other applications ===
- Renault Espace F1

== Renault RS Formula One engine World Championship results ==
- 12 World Constructors' Championships.
- 11 World Drivers' Championships.
- 149 race wins.
- 160 pole positions.
- 409 podium finishes.

== See also ==
- Judd F1 Engine
- Yamaha F1 engine
- Honda V10 engine
- Peugeot F1 engine
- Ilmor 2175 engine
- Mercedes-Benz FO engine
- Hart 1035 engine
- Ferrari V10 engine
- Cosworth JD / VJ engine
- Petronas F1 engine
- Cosworth CR engine
