= Naoki Tokunaga =

- Born: 1966; Tokyo, Japan

Naoki Tokunaga (徳永 直紀, born 1966) is the Japanese former technical director of Renault Sport F1.

== Career ==
Tokunaga studied in Japan and graduated Chuo University. He was a motorsport engineer at Nissan. In 2000, he started working at Enstone as a vehicle dynamics engineer in the Benetton Formula team. In 2002, he was promoted to the position of head of systems control. He designed the electronic systems that are used by the Renault F1 team. He worked in the KERS system development program. In 2010, he became deputy technical director at Lotus, but in 2012 he moved to Renault Sport F1, where he became technical director. He supervised the design and development of new V6 units for the 2014 season. He left Renault in July 2022.

In April 2024, he revealed that he is serving as a senior strategic advisor to Andretti Global.
