= Dirk de Beer =

South African aerodynamicist

- Born: Dirk Laurie de Beer; 2 June 1963 (age 62); Pretoria, South Africa
- Citizenship: South African
- Occupation: Aerodynamicist
- Title: Head of aerodynamics
- Predecessor: Pete Machin

Dirk Laurie de Beer (born 2 June 1963) is a South African Formula One aerodynamicist. He was most recently the head of aerodynamics at the Alpine team until March 2024.

== Biography ==
De Beer joined Renault in 2008, where he worked under Dino Toso until the latter was forced to stand down because of illness. He was head of aerodynamics at the Enstone team from 2008 to 2013. He remained in his post as the team became Lotus F1 from 2012, working with technical directors Bob Bell and James Allison.

He left the British team in 2013 to take on the role of aerodynamics chief at Ferrari, following James Allison who had previously switched from Lotus to the Italian team. De Beer then left Ferrari in 2016 and was replaced by David Sanchez after the departure of Allison.

He joined the Williams team in 2017, taking up the head of aero position as at the start of March. At Williams, he worked alongside David Wheater, who was temporarily responsible for the team's aerodynamic performance after Jason Somerville's departure in late 2016. He started working for the British team on 1 March 2017. After a season start considered below expectations, the Williams team announced his resignation on 30 May 2018.

In early November 2019, Renault announced that de Beer would replace Pete Machin as Head of Aerodynamics.

He continued in the role when the Renault team was rebranded as Alpine in 2021. He resigned from Alpine in March 2024.

== Career timeline ==
- Principal aerodynamicist – Sauber (2002–2005)
- Head of aerodynamics – Renault (2008–2011)
- Head of aerodynamics – Lotus F1 (2012–2013)
- Chief aerodynamicist – Ferrari (2013–2016)
- Head of aerodynamics – Williams (2017–2018)
- Head of aerodynamics – Renault (2019–2020)
- Head of aerodynamics – Alpine F1 (2021–2024)
