= Nick Chester =

British engineer

- Born: 22 March 1969 (age 57); Ripon, England
- Education: Cambridge University
- Occupation: Engineer
- Years active: 1994–present
- Employer: Cadillac
- Known for: Formula One engineer

Nick Chester (born 22 March 1969) is a British Formula One motorsport engineer. Since 2025, he has been the Chief Technical Officer of the Cadillac Formula One Team and was formerly the Technical Director of the Renault Formula One Team.

== Early life ==
Chester graduated in engineering from Cambridge University in 1991.

== Career ==
Chester joined Simtek Research in vehicle simulation, moving to their Formula One entry in 1994. He moved on to Arrows in 1995, first for vehicle simulation, and then to suspension design. He became performance engineer for Damon Hill and Pedro Diniz, then race engineer for Mika Salo and Pedro de la Rosa.

In 2000, Chester joined Benetton as test engineer to Alexander Wurz, Giancarlo Fisichella, and Mark Webber. He became performance engineer for Fisichella in 2001 and Jarno Trulli from 2002 to 2004, overseeing the Italian's only F1 victory (Monaco 2004).

Chester took on the position of head of Renault's Vehicle Performance Group (VPG) in 2005, contributing towards Renault's double championship wins of 2005 and 2006 (F1 Constructors' Championship and Drivers' Championship for Fernando Alonso). Chester oversaw the development of the tuned mass damper system, which was a major innovation. In 2010 Chester was made head of performance systems.

In 2012, Chester was appointed engineering director of Lotus, playing a major part in the race winning E20 and E21 F1 cars. A year later, he replaced James Allison as the team's Technical Director, therefore being responsible for the design and development of every Formula One car to come out of Enstone from May 2013 until January 2020.

In January 2020 Chester was replaced by Pat Fry at Renault. Chester joined the Mercedes-Benz EQ Formula E Team as technical director in July 2020.

In March 2023, Chester joined Andretti Global as the technical director for its Formula 1 project. Since January 2025, Chester has been the Chief Technical Officer of the Cadillac Formula 1 Team.

== Career timeline ==
- Performance engineer – Arrows Grand Prix (1995–2000)
- Performance engineer – Benetton Formula (2000–2001)
- Performance engineer – Renault F1 (2002–2005)
- Head of vehicle Performance Group – Renault F1 (2005–2010)
- Head of performance systems – Renault F1 (2010–2012)
- Engineering director – Lotus F1 (2012–2013)
- Technical director – Lotus F1 (2013–2015)
- Chassis technical director – Renault F1 (2016–2019)
- Technical director – Mercedes-Benz Formula E (2020–2022)
- Technical director – McLaren Formula E (2022–2023)
