= Formula One coverage on ITV =

UK sports television series

ITV-F1
- ITV F1 Logo 1999–2005
- Genre: Sports
- Presented by: Jim Rosenthal (1997–2005); Steve Rider (2006–2008)
- Starring: Louise Goodman (1997–2008); James Allen (1997–2001); Ted Kravitz (2001–2008); Simon Taylor (1997); Tony Jardine (1997-2005); Mark Blundell (2001-2008)
- Narrated by: Murray Walker (1997–2001); James Allen (2001–2008); Martin Brundle (1997–2008)
- Opening theme: "F1" by Jamiroquai (1997–1999) "Blackbeat" by Apollo 440 (2000–2002) "You Ain't Seen Nothing Yet (Arnon Woolfson Remix)" by Bachman-Turner Overdrive (2003–2005) "Catch Me If You Can" by Louise Griffiths (2004) "Lift Me Up" by Moby (2006–2008)
- Country of origin: United Kingdom
- Original language: English

Production
- Production location: Worldwide
- Production company: North One Television

Original release
- Network: ITV; ITV2; ITV3; ITV4
- Release: 8 March 1997 – 2 November 2008

Related
- Grand Prix

ITV held the broadcasting rights for the Formula One coverage in the United Kingdom between 8 March 1997 and 2 November 2008. ITV gained the rights for Formula One coverage for 1997 in late 1995 from the BBC and focused on more in-depth coverage, conducting more interviews and gaining access to better camera angles. The coverage was initially presented by Jim Rosenthal with veteran commentator Murray Walker and former racing driver Martin Brundle being the initial commentators before Walker's retirement after the 2001 United States Grand Prix and was succeeded by pit-lane reporter James Allen. Rosenthal left in 2005 and was succeeded by Steve Rider who presented the coverage until ITV ceased to broadcast Formula One after 2008. Formula One coverage returned to the BBC in 2009 for ITV to focus on more extensive coverage of UEFA Champions League football matches.

The programme was successful in collecting three consecutive BAFTA awards for sporting coverage but also garnered criticism for showing advertisements during their coverage along with their handling of competitions held by the broadcaster. In December 2015, ITV was rumoured to take over the broadcasting rights from BBC from 2016 onwards, after BBC had terminated its broadcasting contract three years early. However, on 21 December 2015 it was announced that Channel 4 would broadcast F1 alongside Sky.

== History ==
=== 1997–2008 ===
ITV F1 logo from 1997-1998

ITV Sport's logo, which was used in F1 broadcasts from 2006-2008.

When the BBC lost their rights to broadcast Formula One in late 1995, ITV gained the coverage for 1997. The deal worth £60 million was negotiated by FOM president Bernie Ecclestone. ITV chose to bid for the rights due to constantly being beaten at weekends while the Grand Prix coverage was on.

ITV's first broadcast was at the 1997 Australian Grand Prix and was hosted by Jim Rosenthal along with Simon Taylor and Tony Jardine as expert analysts and Murray Walker and Martin Brundle as the commentators. The pitlane reporters James Allen and Louise Goodman stayed on for the whole of ITV's coverage over 11 years. ITV had set about focusing their efforts into more in-depth pre- and post-race analysis, better camera angles and conducting more interviews. Rosenthal, Taylor and Jardine all presented from a studio with a view of the paddock and the studio was transported to all the races. One feature for 1997 was known as 'Inside F1' where a driver would demonstrate a certain piece of equipment on a Formula One car and would summarise what operations the equipment performed along with its effects. There was also a track guide using a computer simulation provided by Psygnosis also for 1997. Taylor was primarily hired as a technical analyst during 1997 and was also widely considered to be ITV's main backup for lead commentator in case Walker became ill or unavailable but this would only last one season on ITV's F1 coverage leaving it at the end of 1997 allegedly unhappy over the broadcasters desire to cut down technical analysis segments in order to appeal to a broader audience and to allow for more advertising breaks.The post-race qualifying and race coverage was mainly a discussion between the presenter and the experts going over the key facts of what occurred. In the same year, Simon Taylor was left unable to broadcast live after feeling seasick during the Monaco Grand Prix when the team were presenting on a yacht that kept moving around. Sometimes the presenters hosted from the ITV studios for the Asian races due to costs of travelling.

In the early years, ITV also showed Murray & Martin's F1 Special, which usually aired on Saturday teatimes at each Grand Prix weekend. Introduced by Murray Walker and Martin Brundle, the programmes featured detailed reports on the day's qualifying session, along with interviews and features with the drivers and team personnel. The programme was slowly phased out in 1999, with fewer specials airing, before being dropped altogether at the end of 2000. However Brundle and Walker continue to co-present the end of season review under the title of Murray & Martin's F1 Christmas Special from 1997 until Walker's last season in 2001.

ITV also introduced Martin Brundle's hugely popular gridwalk at the 1997 British Grand Prix, where roughly 10–15 minutes before the start of the race Brundle would walk around the grid interviewing drivers, team personnel, celebrities and whoever else he could find. Brundle had elected not to commentate from some races such as the Canadian Grand Prix in 1997 where he raced at Le Mans and missed the race in 1998. He also elected not to attend the Hungarian Grand Prix on several occasions. When Brundle was absent, different people would stand in the commentary booth, including Derek Warwick, Jody Scheckter, Anthony Davidson and 1996 champion Damon Hill. Mark Blundell also stood in for Brundle on several occasions, prior to becoming a permanent member of the ITV team in 2001 and then continued to do so until 2005.

Steve Rider took over presenting duties in 2006 and would remain presenter until ITV's Formula One coverage concluded at the end of 2008

ITV were not able to show the qualifying for the 1999 French Grand Prix due to a dispute with Formula One Management. FOM President Bernie Ecclestone asked ITV if they wanted live coverage with the broadcaster refusing stating they would show coverage at a later time. Ecclestone apologised in the Sunday Express and the race coverage was unaffected.

In a one-off move for the return of the United States Grand Prix in 2000, ITV moved the coverage over to ITV2 as the schedule of the main channel could not occupy the coverage of the race. The 2001 United States Grand Prix was Murray Walker's last in the ITV commentary booth, having missed four other races that season. James Allen moved up from his former role as pitlane reporter to replace Walker in the commentary box with Brundle still commentating as usual with Ted Kravitz who had previously served as research assistant inheriting Allen's old role of pit lane reporter.

In October 2002, the BBC had prepared pay £175 million to gain the rights off ITV when their contract was to expire at the end of 2004. In April 2004, ITV signed a six-year extension to their contract worth £150 million. In that same year, the coverage dropped its trackside studio and the presenters and analysts provided the coverage directly from within the paddock, allowing them to be at every race location for the first time – in previous years, for certain races, particularly for those held in Asia, the trackside studio was based in London, using satellite link-up to broadcast the race. Despite mostly covering races on sit from 2004 to 2008, ITV would revert to using a London Studio for the 2006 Japanese Grand Prix. With the advent of new anti-tobacco advertising laws in the United Kingdom that were placed in force on 31 July 2005, it was feared that Formula One coverage would be blacked out because with the showing of tobacco company logos on television, the broadcaster would face extra charges even in a country where tobacco sponsorship was permitted. ITV was the UK's live television broadcaster at the time of one of F1's most controversial races in the form of the farcical 2005 United States Grand Prix at which 7 of the 10 planned team entrants on Michelin tyres withdrew on the formation lap due to tyre safety concerns leaving just 3 teams using Bridgestone tyres (Minardi, Jordan and Ferrari (6 cars) to compete in the race, the broadcasting team received widespread praise for how they handled the unique and farcical situation as it unfolded. In September 2005, it was reported that ITV had secured Steve Rider's services and would replace Rosenthal from 2006 onwards to present coverage of Formula One. Rider made his debut broadcast covering ITV F1 coverage at the 2006 Bahrain Grand Prix. Jardine also left the ITV coverage at the end of the 2005 season, leaving Blundell as the sole expert analyst.

ITV extended their contract with North One Television for a further five years in an agreement that started at the first round of the 2006 season and would produce over 100 hours of content which also included qualifying and the highlight shows. ITV were the host broadcasters for the British Grand Prix.

In March 2008, ITV announced the coverage would be transferred to the BBC from the 2009 season so that the broadcaster could focus more on coverage on the UEFA Champions League. The contract to show the sport at the time of announcement was worth £25 million. ITV later announced that they had enacted a clause within their contract enabling them to leave F1 coverage after the 2008 season.

At the 2008 Japanese Grand Prix, Martin Brundle stood in as the lead presenter as Steve Rider was unavailable due to his commitments hosting England international football on the same weekend. This wasn't the first time that ITV's main F1 presenter had missed a race for such a reason, Rosenthal had missed the 2005 Belgian Grand Prix to be part of ITV's live coverage of boxing on that particular weekend, he was replaced in the role for that race by Angus Scott. Similarly, Rider missed the 2006 United States Grand Prix as he was in Germany presenting ITV's coverage of the 2006 FIFA World Cup, with Scott again presenting that race in his absence. Damon Hill has appeared as a commentator twice, filling in for Brundle at the Hungarian Grand Prix in 2007 and 2008.

Ironically, ITV F1's highest ever broadcast rating came in its final race, the 2008 Brazilian Grand Prix, which attracted 8.8 million viewers, peaking at 12.5 million viewers and saw Lewis Hamilton win his first Formula One Drivers' World Championship title. On 17 November 2008, BBC announced that Martin Brundle would continue his commentary role alongside Jonathan Legard during the 2009 season, while Ted Kravitz would continue his pit-lane reporter role alongside Lee McKenzie.

== Features ==
=== Theme music ===
ITV's F1 coverage used five different themes throughout its lifespan. The first theme was a special, untitled, track performed by Jamiroquai which lasted from 1997 to 1999. This theme was commissioned in February 1997 and cost £100,000 to compose. Neil Duncanson, who worked for Chrysalis Sport and was ITV-F1's producer, was a friend of frontman Jay Kay, who is a fan of Formula One.

In 2000, Jamiroquai's theme was replaced by "Blackbeat" by Apollo 440 which lasted until 2002, replaced the following year by a remixed version by Arnon Woolfson of "You Ain't Seen Nothing Yet" by Bachman–Turner Overdrive. Throughout 2004, ITV incorporated the song "Catch Me If You Can" which was written specifically for the programme by Woolfson and performed by singer-songwriter Louise Griffiths, who at the time was engaged to BAR driver Jenson Button. The final theme was "Lift Me Up" by Moby which ran from 2006 until 2008.

=== Website ===
The ITV-F1 website was launched in March 1998 as a joint venture between ITV, F1 Racing and Business Net at a cost of £700,000 for the year. Initial content was provided by F1 Racing with news updates from Murray Walker and Martin Brundle. The site was revamped in July 1999 with the addition of a superstore selling Formula One merchandise along with a multimedia content area and a loyalty club. The website was closed in January 2012 citing the joint televised deal between the BBC and Sky as the reason.

=== Sponsorship ===
Between 1997 and 2001, ITV's coverage was sponsored by Texaco, who outbid RAC in December 1996. For the first year, the sponsorship promotion was created by Steve Pickard and directed by David Harris who were both from IMP. The sponsorship credits were based upon the speed and excitement of a Formula One team refuelling one of their racing cars with a circular theme involving the Texaco logo. Texaco placed £12 million in the first three years of their contract with ITV. The credits were directed by Darryl Goodrich and produced by Nicolas Unsworth.

Coverage of the 2002 and 2003 seasons was sponsored by Toyota, who signed a four-year deal worth £25 million in September 2001, seeing off competition from Fosters, who previously sponsored the ITV-F1 website. The car manufacturer pulled out at the end of 2003 to focus on brand advertising.

The Daily Telegraph signed a one-year £4.5 million deal to take over the sponsorship in 2004.

In 2005, LG took over the sponsorship with a £3.5 million contract for a year. Their sponsorship included the promotion of the LG Mobile brand among the aim for younger viewers to watch the programming.

For a period in 2006, Swiftcover.com sponsored the coverage from that year's San Marino Grand Prix. The screening of their sponsorship included Formula One drivers who were frustrated whilst speaking over the team radio to chickens in the pit lane.

For 2007, Honda took over as the main sponsor which also included Honda's logo being placed onto the ITV-F1 website with the aim to attract younger viewers. The idents for Honda's sponsorship were produced by Honda's creative agency Wieden and Kennedy which built upon the car manufacturers indisputable passion for motor racing.

For 2008, Sony signed a deal that was negotiated by OMD UK as the final sponsor of the network's coverage. The amount of sponsorship money was unpublished but was thought to be around £5 million. The idents were developed by fallon with digital and mobile assets developed by Dare.

== Scheduling ==
All races were broadcast live with occasional reruns in races where the start time was considered early for fans who had elected not to watch at an earlier time. Originally, qualifying sessions for races held in North America were not shown live and were instead screened as delayed coverage, usually beginning at 11:00pm. From 2005, these sessions were shown live, but on ITV2 and ITV3 and in 2006 and 2007 the sessions were screened live on ITV3 and ITV4, with it being repeated on ITV later that night. In 2008, all qualifying sessions were screened live on the ITV network.

When qualifying was split into two sessions from 2003, ITV broadcast the Friday session as delayed coverage in a late night slot, usually at around midnight, except for the British Grand Prix, in which the Friday session was shown live. The Saturday session was broadcast live as normal. In 2004, when both qualifying sessions were held on Saturday, only the second session was shown live, with only brief highlights from the first session shown in the build-up. When qualifying for the Japanese Grand Prix that year was postponed to Sunday owing to a typhoon alert, neither session was shown live. For 2005, when qualifying was split into a Saturday–Sunday format, only the Saturday session was shown live, with brief highlights of the Sunday session shown in the race build-up. This format proved unpopular with fans and was scrapped following the first six races that year, with qualifying for the rest of that year reverting to just a single one-lap session on Saturday.

The highlights programme lasted for one hour and would normally have started at around 11:35pm depending on the schedule.

== Production ==
ITV's coverage was originally produced by Mach 1 Productions from 1997 to 1999. In 2000, production was taken over by Chrysalis Sport in association with United Productions. Prior to the start of the 2002 season, United Productions was taken over by Granada Media, making the coverage a Chrysalis/Granada co-production. Chrysalis became North One Television in 2004, which continued to co-produce the coverage with Granada until the end of 2005, before becoming the sole production company from 2006.

== Awards ==
ITV were awarded three consecutive BAFTA awards for the Best Sports Programme for their coverage of the 2006 Hungarian Grand Prix, 2007 Canadian Grand Prix and the 2008 Brazilian Grand Prix.

== Criticism ==
=== Showing of advertisements ===
A major criticism of ITV's coverage was they were permitted to show advertisements during the coverage which promoted a number of complaints from viewers. Many key events in races were not shown as live as a result over the years of the coverage, some of these included: Damon Hill overtaking Michael Schumacher for the race lead at the 1997 Hungarian Grand Prix (where he eventually finished second due to a hydraulic failure), Schumacher's retirement at the 1998 Japanese Grand Prix which handed the drivers' championship to Mika Häkkinen, Schumacher's crash at the 1999 Canadian Grand Prix, Schumacher's engine failures at the 2000 French Grand Prix and 2006 Japanese Grand Prix, Fernando Alonso's engine failure at the 2006 Italian Grand Prix, Lewis Hamilton's gearbox troubles at the 2007 Brazilian Grand Prix which cost him the championship to Kimi Räikkönen, and Räikkönen's engine failure at the 2008 European Grand Prix.

Prior to the 2006 season it was reported by Pitpass that ITV was considering merging its advert breaks with continuing race coverage using a split screen method to show both adverts and live race pictures simultaneously. However, these reports proved unfounded with ITV retaining conventional advert breaks and would continue to do so until ITV's coverage ended in 2008.

==== 2005 San Marino Grand Prix coverage controversy ====
The most egregious incident however occurred at the 2005 San Marino Grand Prix when the broadcaster cut to a commercial break during the closing moments of the race whilst Michael Schumacher and Fernando Alonso were engaged in a close on track duel for the race victory. This decision garnered 126 complaints from viewers. Ofcom ruled that ITV breached section 6.7 of the Rules on the Amount and Scheduling of Advertising. The broadcasters also had not shown the post-race press conference segment featuring Jenson Button's comments about the race. ITV repeated the last three laps after the race and as a result of these complaints, the server on their website crashed. An on-air apology was made by Jim Rosenthal before the start of the next race in Spain two weeks later.

In a 2022 interview on The Race's Bring Back V10s podcast looking back retrospectively at this particular race Ted Kravitz (who was ITV's pitlane reporter at the event) stated ITV held off going to the final commercial break because Jenson Button had been leading the race at certain points and the assumption that Schumacher would pass Alonso relatively quickly as the reason for the channel delaying an advert break until the closing laps and also criticised Ofcom for their response to complaints.

=== Coverage ===
Many fans of the sport criticised the coverage of the 2007 Canadian Grand Prix when the programme had ended just after the race concluded. ITV made arrangements for the next race that if coverage overran, the show would continue to be shown on ITV4.

=== Competition ===
In 2009, Ofcom ruled that ITV's handling of the competition for their last race broadcast had broken competition rules when 139,000 viewers rang a premium phone line charging £1 for a chance of winning the prize. The competition organiser Eckoh was not overseen by the broadcaster. In July 2009, ITV awarded the winner of the competition the prize that was not awarded because the winner's name was not published at the required time.

== International sub-licensing distributions ==
In Indonesia, Formula One coverage on ITV was a trusted direct relay broadcasting sub-license supplier since 2002 when TPI (now MNCTV) took over from RCTI (under sub-license with ESPN Star Sports Singapore and Hong Kong partnership) as official free-to-air broadcast partner until 2004 season and later switched to Global TV from 2005 to 2008 seasons. Although using a direct relay broadcasting format during live qualifying and race sessions, the localized content segments including pre-race dialogues, quizzes and studio segments were retained.

The only exceptions were 2002 Italian Grand Prix and 2008 Canadian Grand Prix races and also 2007 British Grand Prix and 2007 European Grand Prix qualifyings that shown on recorded tape delay formats due to avoid clash with selected live football matches.

== Legacy ==
ITV's F1 coverage helped to pave the way on how motor sport would be broadcast in the modern era. Many of the features such as Martin Brundle's gridwalk and the pre- and post-race analysis were all transferred when the coverage returned to the BBC.

== See also ==
- Grand Prix – The BBC's Formula One programme from 1978 to 1996 and from 2009 to 2015
- Sky Sports F1 – Sky's television channel created for coverage of Formula One since 2012
- Channel 4 F1 – Channel 4's coverage of Formula One since 2016
- Sports broadcasting contracts in the United Kingdom
- Broadcasting of sports events
