= Grand Prix (TV programme) =

British television sports programme (1978–2015)

- 1994–1995 opening titles
- Presented by: Murray Walker (1978–1996); Steve Rider (1985–1996); Harry Carpenter (1978–1980); Des Lynam (1980–1985); Sue Barker (1994–1996); Jake Humphrey (2009–2012); Suzi Perry (2013–2015)
- Starring: Jonathan Palmer (1990–1993); Tony Jardine (1994–1996); Ted Kravitz (2009–2011); Lee McKenzie (2009–2015); Gary Anderson (2012–2013); Tom Clarkson (2013–2015); Murray Walker(2009–2015)
- Narrated by: Murray Walker (1978–1996); James Hunt (1979–1993); Jonathan Palmer (1993–1996); Jonathan Legard (2009–2010); Martin Brundle (1995, 2009–2011); David Coulthard (2011–2015); Ben Edwards (2012–2015); Allan McNish (2012–2015)
- Opening theme: "The Chain" by Fleetwood Mac
- Country of origin: United Kingdom

Production
- Running time: First run: Qualifying: 80 minutes Pre-race: 5 to 15 minutes Race: 1.5 to 2 hours (depending on race length) Highlights 25 to 50 minutes; Second run: Qualifying: 90–150 minutes Pre-race: 40–60 minutes Race: 2 hours (depending on race length) Post Race 15–60 minutes Highlights 45–75 minutes

Original release
- Network: BBC One; BBC Two; BBC Three; BBC HD; BBC News; BBC Red Button
- Release: 7 May 1978 – 13 October 1996
- Release: 27 March 2009 – 29 November 2015

Grand Prix, (also simply referred to as Formula One on the BBC or BBC F1 during its second run from 2009 to 2015) is a British television programme based on the Formula One World Championship, had three main presenters during its history: Murray Walker from 1978 to 1996, Jake Humphrey from 2009 to 2012 and Suzi Perry from 2013 to 2015. Among the more occasional hosts were Steve Rider, Des Lynam, Sue Barker and Lee McKenzie.

== Production ==
In the early days of the programme, all races apart from the British Grand Prix were commentated at BBC Television Centre in London due to the high costs of travelling to races with live broadcasts done on location. The team would not usually travel to non-European races to commentate unless another broadcaster paid for the travel expenses. Murray Walker would usually be flown to the location of the tracks to record a short scene before returning to England to watch the race from London with some broadcasts having commentary live with highlights aired or recorded commentary in highlights. On occasions the BBC employed a "ghost commentator" which was someone who would be in touch with the production team in London and gained access to timing monitors so that cameras could record what was occurring off the track. The first "ghost commentator" was Mark Fogarty with Joe Saward taking over in the early 1990s.

== Conception ==
Following the excitement and interest of the 1976 Formula One season, the BBC decided to cover all races from 1978. The BBC originally wanted to have Raymond Baxter as commentator but his commitments with Tomorrow's World and air shows that aired on BBC taking his priority, BBC had Murray Walker on their list as well and Walker got the job.

The corporation had initially shown the odd race that featured on the calendar from 1959 till 1977 either live in segments or in highlights (these mostly being Monaco, Belgian, British (BBC being host broadcaster), German, Dutch and Italian Grands Prix) but elected to go with as many races as possible from 1978.

== History ==
=== 1978–1996 ===
The first broadcast of the programme came at the 1978 Monaco Grand Prix and the show featured one of the most iconic theme tunes in sport, with Fleetwood Mac's "The Chain".

In 1978, the BBC showed 11 races, Monaco, Belgium, Spain, France, Britain, Germany, Austria, Holland, Italy, United States and Canada. Most of their highlight shows were aired on BBC2 late at night although the British Grand Prix was shown live and they aired highlights of the Canadian Grand Prix on the Wednesday after the race on Sportsnight and also the first race in Argentina on the Wednesday after again on Sportsnight both on BBC1. The South Africa, Brazil, USA West Long Beach (both as highlights the week later) and Sweden races were also shown on ITV.

1979 saw Monaco and Britain live on BBC1, highlights of all their races were shown on BBC2 except Brazil which was aired on the Wednesday after the race on Sportsnight, and the Austrian Grand Prix which was not aired due to a TV dispute with host broadcaster ORF and the race promoters. From the Italian Grand Prix onwards saw James Hunt join the commentary booth alongside Walker after Hunt announced his retirement from racing that year.

1980 saw Monaco and Britain live on BBC1, highlights of all their races were shown on BBC2 except Brazil.

From 1981 onwards, the BBC showed some of the races live in Sunday Grandstand and the rest as highlights in Grand Prix with all of the European races shown live in segments on Sunday Grandstand. Some races were shown only as highlights in Grand Prix due to either race times in the morning/evening or because Grandstand was showing another major events at the same time. The last race of the season in 1981, the Las Vegas Grand Prix, and 1986, Australian Grand Prix, both due to being last race title deciders, were shown live, as was the 1982 Las Vegas Grand Prix with John Watson being in title contention at the last race of the season was not shown live (this was due to BBC2 showing live Darts coverage while the race was on). The final race title deciders in 1983 South Africa and 1984 Portugal were both live on Grandstand as in these first 4 years of regular live BBC coverage (1981–84) the title went to the last race of the season.

1992 saw Jonathan Palmer join as a pit reporter for the live races but following the 1993 Canadian Grand Prix, Hunt died from a heart attack and was replaced in the commentary box by Palmer. For the following race in France, BBC aired a tribute show to Hunt following their highlights show. In 1995, all the races were shown live and all qualifying sessions were shown live in 1996 - previously qualifying was covered as a brief report during Grandstand, apart from qualifying for the British Grand Prix which was generally shown live and in full. Many of these live races were fronted by either Steve Rider or Sue Barker.

=== End of Grand Prix (first run) ===
In 1995 it was announced that the BBC had lost the television broadcast rights to Formula One to ITV for the 1997 season. Murray Walker would continue in his role as the lead commentator. The final race broadcast by the programme was the 1996 Japanese Grand Prix in which viewers saw Damon Hill win his only world championship.

=== 2009–2011 ===
BBC Sport's logo, which was used in F1 broadcasts from 2009 to 2015.

In March 2008, ITV announced the coverage would be transferred to the BBC from the 2009 season to allow ITV to focus on its UEFA Champions League football coverage. The BBC would air all races Live on BBC One with BBC Two being used if clashes occurred. Practice sessions were aired on BBC Red Button with commentary provided from BBC Radio 5 Live. Highlights of the races on BBC Three at 7:00pm on Sunday evenings (except for races such as Brazil, Canada, America and Bahrain from 2014, where later start times meant the highlights were aired late at night or Australia, Japan, China and Malaysia which were shown late Sunday afternoon on BBC One or BBC Two).

Lee McKenzie presented Inside F1 at 18:45 on Friday and Saturday on the BBC News (UK feed), with a short highlight package and the latest news.

McKenzie made her debut as the main presenter at the 2010 Japanese Grand Prix however the qualifying was postponed until Sunday morning, resulting in the qualifying highlights being scrapped on Saturday afternoon. She remarked when facing a similar situation in 2019 for Channel 4 F1 podcast, 'I was grabbing people to fill air time', before the session was postponed on Friday night.

The 2010 Korean Grand Prix had a delay of the start by 10 minutes, then a red flag stoppage after three laps which lasted 45 minutes both in rain. That resulted in coverage initially delaying The Andrew Marr Show which was scheduled at 9:15am, before the rest of the race was moved from BBC One to BBC Two at 9:30am. This channel switch resulted in 273 viewers complaining that they had set their PVRs to record the race but had missed out on its climax, when most of the exciting incidents occurred. BBC spokesman said to The Guardian "Sunday's Korean Grand Prix was delayed due to extreme weather. The subsequent disruption to the schedule was flagged up to the audience throughout via the commentary and was also made clear again just prior to switching the coverage to BBC Two. However, the BBC also has a responsibility to reflect a wide range of interests and therefore the decision was taken to switch the F1 coverage to BBC Two until its conclusion."

The 2011 Canadian Grand Prix saw a red flag that lasted 120 minutes, that resulted in coverage initially cancelling Antiques Roadshow which was scheduled to air at 8:00pm before coverage of the Grand Prix switched to BBC Two and BBC HD at 9:00pm, that resulted in 700 fans complaining about the cancellation of Antiques Roadshow in favour of the Grand Prix.

=== 2012–2015 ===
In July 2011, BBC announced that half their races would be live from 2012 and got a contract to 2018 with Sky Sports covering all races. Highlights of the live races continued to be shown on BBC Three, whereas the races shown by live Sky Sports were shown on BBC One or BBC Two.

From the 2013 season, live practice sessions moved from BBC Red Button and BBC iPlayer to BBC Two or BBC Three.

Martin Brundle and Ted Kravitz left BBC for Sky at the end of 2011 and were replaced by Ben Edwards as lead commentator and former Jordan Grand Prix designer Gary Anderson joining as reporter and technical analyst. Jake Humphrey continued to host, Eddie Jordan analysed on live races and David Coulthard stayed as colour commentator. Humphrey was forced to skip Canada and Europe due to him hosting Euro 2012 for BBC's Match of the Day and skipped Germany and Hungary due to him hosting the 2012 Olympics for BBC. Lee McKenzie filled in for him at these races and her role was taken by Tom Clarkson. Humphrey left at the end of 2012 to join BT Sport and was replaced by Suzi Perry. Allan McNish joined as analyst and Clarkson joined full time. BBC aired all three practice session for their live races on BBC Two or BBC Three. Anderson left at the end of 2013. The BBC kept their remaining staff for 2014 and 2015.

=== End of BBC F1 television coverage ===
In late 2015, BBC wanted a budget cut of £21 million to the sports department. In December 2015, BBC axed Grand Prix as part of their budget cuts and was replaced by Channel 4 from 2016. Coulthard, Jordan, Walker, Edwards and McKenzie all joined Channel 4 in the same roles.

Some episodes are still available but hidden on the BBC's website.

As of 2025, despite the BBC's loss of Formula One television rights BBC Radio continues to provide radio coverage of Grand Prix through BBC Radio 5 live and its sister station BBC Radio 5 Sports Extra. The BBC currently radio coverage rights for Formula One until the end of the 2027 season.

== Broadcast history ==
=== Presenters ===
Year	Name	Roles
1978–96; 2009-15	Murray Walker	Presenter / Commentator / Analysis/ Guest Feature contributor
2009-12	Jake Humphrey	Main Presenter
2013-15	Suzi Perry	
1980-96	Steve Rider	Relief presenter
1994-96	Sue Barker	
2012-15	Jennie Gow	
2009-15	Lee McKenzie	Main Presenter (Inside F1) / Relief Presenter

=== Races ===
Below is a summary of the BBC's broadcasts on BBC1 and BBC2.

Year	Grand Prix	Coverage	Channel	Host	Lap-by-lap	Colour commentators	Pit reporter
1995	(Brazil) Brazilian	Live	BBC2	Steve Rider	Murray Walker	Jonathan Palmer; Martin Brundle	Tony Jardine
1995	(Brazil) Brazilian	Highlights	BBC2	Murray Walker	Murray Walker	Jonathan Palmer; Martin Brundle	Tony Jardine
1995	(Argentina) Argentine	Live	BBC2	Dougie Donnelly	Murray Walker	Jonathan Palmer; Martin Brundle	Tony Jardine
1995	(Argentina) Argentine	Highlights	BBC2	Murray Walker	Murray Walker	Jonathan Palmer; Martin Brundle	Tony Jardine
1995	San Marino	Live	BBC2	Steve Rider (Note: 1995 San Marino Grand Prix aired live on Sunday Grandstand, Steve Rider hosted at Imola and Sue Barker hosted from BBC Television Centre in London.)	Murray Walker	Jonathan Palmer; Martin Brundle	Tony Jardine
1995	San Marino	Highlights	BBC2	Murray Walker	Murray Walker	Jonathan Palmer; Martin Brundle	Tony Jardine
1995	(Spain) Spanish	Live	BBC2	Sue Barker	Murray Walker	Jonathan Palmer	Tony Jardine
1995	(Spain) Spanish	Highlights	BBC2	Murray Walker	Murray Walker	Jonathan Palmer	Tony Jardine
1995	Monaco	Live	BBC2	Steve Rider	Murray Walker	Jonathan Palmer	Tony Jardine
1995	Monaco	Highlights	BBC1	Murray Walker	Murray Walker	Jonathan Palmer	Tony Jardine
1995	(Canada) Canadian	Live	BBC2	Steve Rider	Murray Walker	Jonathan Palmer	Tony Jardine
1995	(Canada) Canadian	Highlights	BBC1	Murray Walker	Murray Walker	Jonathan Palmer	Tony Jardine
1995	(France) French	Live	BBC2	Steve Rider	Murray Walker	Jonathan Palmer	Tony Jardine
1995	(France) French	Highlights	BBC2	Murray Walker	Murray Walker	Jonathan Palmer	Tony Jardine
1995	(United Kingdom) British	Live	BBC2	Steve Rider	Murray Walker	Jonathan Palmer	Tony Jardine
1995	(United Kingdom) British	Highlights	BBC2	Steve Rider	Murray Walker	Jonathan Palmer	Tony Jardine
1995	(Germany) German	Live	BBC1	Sue Barker	Murray Walker	Jonathan Palmer; Martin Brundle	Tony Jardine
1995	(Germany) German	Highlights	BBC2	Murray Walker	Murray Walker	Jonathan Palmer; Martin Brundle	Tony Jardine
1995	(Hungary) Hungarian	Live	BBC1	Steve Rider	Murray Walker	Jonathan Palmer	Tony Jardine
1995	(Hungary) Hungarian	Highlights	BBC2	Murray Walker	Murray Walker	Jonathan Palmer	Tony Jardine
1995	(Belgium) Belgian	Live	BBC1	Sue Barker	Murray Walker	Jonathan Palmer	Tony Jardine
1995	(Belgium) Belgian	Highlights	BBC2	Murray Walker	Murray Walker	Jonathan Palmer	Tony Jardine
1995	(Italy) Italian	Live	BBC2	Steve Rider	Murray Walker	Jonathan Palmer	Tony Jardine
1995	(Italy) Italian	Highlights	BBC2	Murray Walker	Murray Walker	Jonathan Palmer	Tony Jardine
1995	(Portugal) Portuguese	Live	BBC2	Steve Rider; Sue Barker (Note: 1995 Portuguese Grand Prix aired live on Sunday Grandstand, Steve Rider hosted from BBC Television Centre in London and Sue Barker hosted from Ascot Racecourse where there was two horse races shown live at Ascot after the Grand Prix.)	Murray Walker	Jonathan Palmer	Tony Jardine
1995	(Portugal) Portuguese	Highlights	BBC2	Murray Walker	Murray Walker	Jonathan Palmer	Tony Jardine
1995	(Europe) European	Live	BBC1	Steve Rider	Murray Walker	Jonathan Palmer	Tony Jardine
1995	(Europe) European	Highlights	BBC2	Murray Walker	Murray Walker	Jonathan Palmer	Tony Jardine
1995	(Japan) Pacific	Live	BBC2	Steve Rider	Murray Walker	Jonathan Palmer; Martin Brundle	Tony Jardine
1995	(Japan) Pacific	Highlights	BBC2	Murray Walker	Murray Walker	Jonathan Palmer; Martin Brundle	Tony Jardine
1995	(Japan) Japanese	Live	BBC2	Steve Rider	Murray Walker	Jonathan Palmer	Tony Jardine
1995	(Japan) Japanese	Highlights	BBC2	Murray Walker	Murray Walker	Jonathan Palmer	Tony Jardine
1995	(Australia) Australian	Live	BBC2	Steve Rider	Murray Walker	Jonathan Palmer; Alan Jones	Barry Sheene
1995	(Australia) Australian	Highlights	BBC2	Murray Walker	Murray Walker	Jonathan Palmer; Alan Jones	Barry Sheene
1996	(Australia) Australian	Live	BBC2	Steve Rider	Murray Walker	Jonathan Palmer	Tony Jardine
1996	(Australia) Australian	Highlights	BBC2	Murray Walker	Murray Walker	Jonathan Palmer	Tony Jardine
1996	(Brazil) Brazilian	Live	BBC2	Steve Rider	Murray Walker	Jonathan Palmer	Tony Jardine
1996	(Brazil) Brazilian	Highlights	BBC2	Murray Walker	Murray Walker	Jonathan Palmer	Tony Jardine
1996	(Argentina) Argentine	Live	BBC2	Sue Barker	Murray Walker	Jonathan Palmer	Tony Jardine
1996	(Argentina) Argentine	Highlights	BBC2	Murray Walker	Murray Walker	Jonathan Palmer	Tony Jardine
1996	(Europe) European	Live	BBC2	Sue Barker	Murray Walker	Jonathan Palmer	Tony Jardine
1996	(Europe) European	Highlights	BBC2	Murray Walker	Murray Walker	Jonathan Palmer	Tony Jardine
1996	San Marino	Live	BBC2	Sue Barker	Murray Walker	Jonathan Palmer	Tony Jardine
1996	San Marino	Highlights	BBC2	Murray Walker	Murray Walker	Jonathan Palmer	Tony Jardine
1996	Monaco	Live	BBC1	Sue Barker	Murray Walker	Jonathan Palmer	Tony Jardine
1996	Monaco	Highlights	BBC2	Murray Walker	Murray Walker	Jonathan Palmer	Tony Jardine
1996	(Spain) Spanish	Live	BBC2	Steve Rider	Murray Walker	Jonathan Palmer	Tony Jardine
1996	(Spain) Spanish	Highlights	BBC2	Murray Walker	Murray Walker	Jonathan Palmer	Tony Jardine
1996	(Canada) Canadian	Live	BBC2	Sue Barker	Murray Walker	Jonathan Palmer	Tony Jardine
1996	(Canada) Canadian	Highlights	BBC2	Murray Walker	Murray Walker	Jonathan Palmer	Tony Jardine
1996	(France) French	Live	BBC2	Steve Rider	Murray Walker	Jonathan Palmer	Tony Jardine
1996	(France) French	Highlights	BBC2	Murray Walker	Murray Walker	Jonathan Palmer	Tony Jardine
1996	(United Kingdom) British	Live	BBC2	Steve Rider	Murray Walker	Jonathan Palmer	Tony Jardine
1996	(United Kingdom) British	Highlights	BBC2	Murray Walker	Murray Walker	Jonathan Palmer	Tony Jardine
1996	(Germany) German	Live	BBC1	Steve Rider	Murray Walker	Jonathan Palmer	Tony Jardine
1996	(Germany) German	Highlights	BBC2	Murray Walker	Murray Walker	Jonathan Palmer	Tony Jardine
1996	(Hungary) Hungarian	Live	BBC1	Steve Rider	Murray Walker	Jonathan Palmer	Tony Jardine
1996	(Hungary) Hungarian	Highlights	BBC2	Murray Walker	Murray Walker	Jonathan Palmer	Tony Jardine
1996	(Belgium) Belgian	Live	BBC1	Sue Barker	Murray Walker	Jonathan Palmer	Tony Jardine
1996	(Belgium) Belgian	Highlights	BBC2	Murray Walker	Murray Walker	Jonathan Palmer	Tony Jardine
1996	(Italy) Italian	Live	BBC2	Steve Rider (Note: 1996 Italian Grand Prix aired live on Sunday Grandstand, Steve Rider hosted at Monza and Sue Barker hosted from BBC Television Centre in London.)	Murray Walker	Jonathan Palmer	Tony Jardine
1996	(Italy) Italian	Highlights	BBC2	Steve Rider	Murray Walker	Jonathan Palmer	Tony Jardine
1996	(Portugal) Portuguese	Live	BBC2	Steve Rider (Note: 1996 Portuguese Grand Prix aired live on Sunday Grandstand, Steve Rider hosted at Estoril and Sue Barker hosted from BBC Television Centre in London.)	Murray Walker	Jonathan Palmer	Tony Jardine
1996	(Portugal) Portuguese	Highlights	BBC2	Steve Rider	Murray Walker	Jonathan Palmer	Tony Jardine
1996	(Japan) Japanese	Live	BBC2	Steve Rider	Murray Walker	Jonathan Palmer	Tony Jardine
1996	(Japan) Japanese	Highlights	BBC2	Steve Rider	Murray Walker	Jonathan Palmer	Tony Jardine

=== Documentaries ===
Date	Documentary	Channel	Host	Guests	Programme Information
26 December 1991	1991 Season Review	BBC2	Steve Rider	Ayrton Senna; Nigel Mansell; Eddie Jordan; Patrick Head	Ayrton Senna vs Nigel Mansell for the 1991 championship.
25 December 1992	Nigel Mansell 1992	BBC2	Steve Rider	Nigel Mansell; Frank Williams	Nigel Mansell's Dominance in 1992 driving for Williams.
4 July 1993	James Hunt Tribute	BBC2	Murray Walker	Lord Hesketh; Niki Lauda; Nigel Mansell; Ayrton Senna; Sir Jackie Stewart	Tribute to 1976 World Champion and BBC's Grand Prix commentator James Hunt following his death.
4 May 1994	Ayrton Senna Tribute	BBC2	Murray Walker; Steve Rider	Richard West; Ron Dennis; Sir Jackie Stewart; Nigel Mansell	Tribute to Ayrton Senna after his death at the San Marino Grand Prix.
30 December 1995	Schumacher	BBC2	Steve Rider	Damon Hill; Flavio Briatore; Martin Brundle; Murray Walker; Michael Schumacher; John Watson; David Coulthard; Heinz-Harald Frentzen; Ross Brawn; Jochen Mass; John Postlethwaite; Mary Spillane; Johnny Herbert; Jonathan Palmer; Willi Weber	Michael Schumacher's dominance in 1995 driving for Benetton.
15 October 1996	Damon Hill World Champion	BBC2	Steve Rider	Damon Hill; Eddie Jordan; Bette Hill; Johnny Herbert; Jon Nicholson; George Harrison; Nigel Mansell; Patrick Head; Frank Williams; Alain Prost; David Coulthard	Damon Hill's Dominance in 1996 driving for Williams.
