= Legends of F1 =

- Genre: Sport
- Presented by: Steve Rider
- Country of origin: United Kingdom
- Original language: English
- No. of series: 3
- No. of episodes: 20

Production
- Running time: 30 minutes (episodes 1-4, 6, 8-9); 60 minutes (episodes 5, 7, 10-) (incl. adverts)

Original release
- Network: Sky Sports F1
- Release: 9 March 2012 – 21 September 2014

Legends of F1, also known as F1 Legends, is a British television programme shown on Sky Sports F1. Steve Rider presents the series of interviews with Formula One legends of the past and present. Sky Sports F1 have also produced a similar series titled Architects of F1, with five episodes featuring Max Mosley, Gordon Murray, Jo Ramírez, John Barnard and Flavio Briatore.

== Episode list ==
Series 1 (2012)

#	Airdate	Legend	Notes
1	9 March 2012	Emerson Fittipaldi	Won the championship in 1972 and 1974.
2	9 March 2012	Sir Jackie Stewart	Won the championship in 1969, 1971, and 1973.
3	18 March 2012	Nigel Mansell	Won the championship in 1992.
4	25 March 2012	Jody Scheckter	Won the championship in 1979.
5	15 April 2012	Mario Andretti	Won the championship in 1978. This was the first episode in the series to be an hour long, instead of the normal 30 minutes.
6	22 April 2012	Alan Jones	Won the championship in 1980.
7	13 May 2012	John Surtees	Won the championship in 1964. (60 minutes)
8	27 May 2012	Sir Jack Brabham	Won the championship in 1959, 1960 and 1966.
9	10 June 2012	Murray Walker	A look at the career of the former F1 commentator. This episode was presented by Georgie Thompson, rather than the usual host Steve Rider.
10	24 June 2012	Mika Häkkinen	Won the championship in 1998 and 1999. (60 minutes)
11	8 July 2012	Sir Stirling Moss	World Championship runner-up in 1955, 1956, 1957 and 1958. (60 minutes)

Series 2 (2013)

#	Airdate	Legend	Notes
1	14 April 2013	Tony Brooks	Nicknamed 'the racing dentist', Brooks was described by Stirling Moss as "the greatest unknown racing driver there has ever been". (60 minutes)
2	26 May 2013	Gerhard Berger	A look at the career of the Austrian driver. A winner of ten grands prix, the former Ferrari and McLaren driver also claimed Benetton's first and last victories. (60 minutes)
3	30 June 2013	Sir Frank Williams	A look at the illustrious career of the founder and team principal of Williams, which won the constructors' championship nine times between 1980 and 1997. (60 minutes)
4	8 September 2013	Alain Prost	Won the championship in 1985, 1986, 1989 and 1993. (60 minutes)
5	22 September 2013	Eddie Irvine	A look at the career of the former Jordan, Ferrari and Jaguar racer that missed out on the 1999 world championship by just three points. (60 minutes)
6	24 November 2013	John Watson	A look at the career of the former Brabham, Lotus and McLaren racer who finished a career-high third in the 1982 season. (60 minutes)

Series 3 (2014)

#	Airdate	Legend	Notes
1	16 March 2014	Juan Pablo Montoya	A look at the career of the Colombian driver who drove for both Williams and McLaren, achieving two third place finishes in the drivers' championship with the former. (60 minutes)
2	1 May 2014	Ayrton Senna	A special episode of the series, shown as part of Sky Sports F1's Senna Week. The Brazilian driver won the championship in 1988, 1990 and 1991. (60 minutes)
3	21 September 2014	Niki Lauda	Won the championship in 1975, 1977 and 1984. (60 minutes)
