= Steve Rider =

British sports journalist and presenter (born 1950)

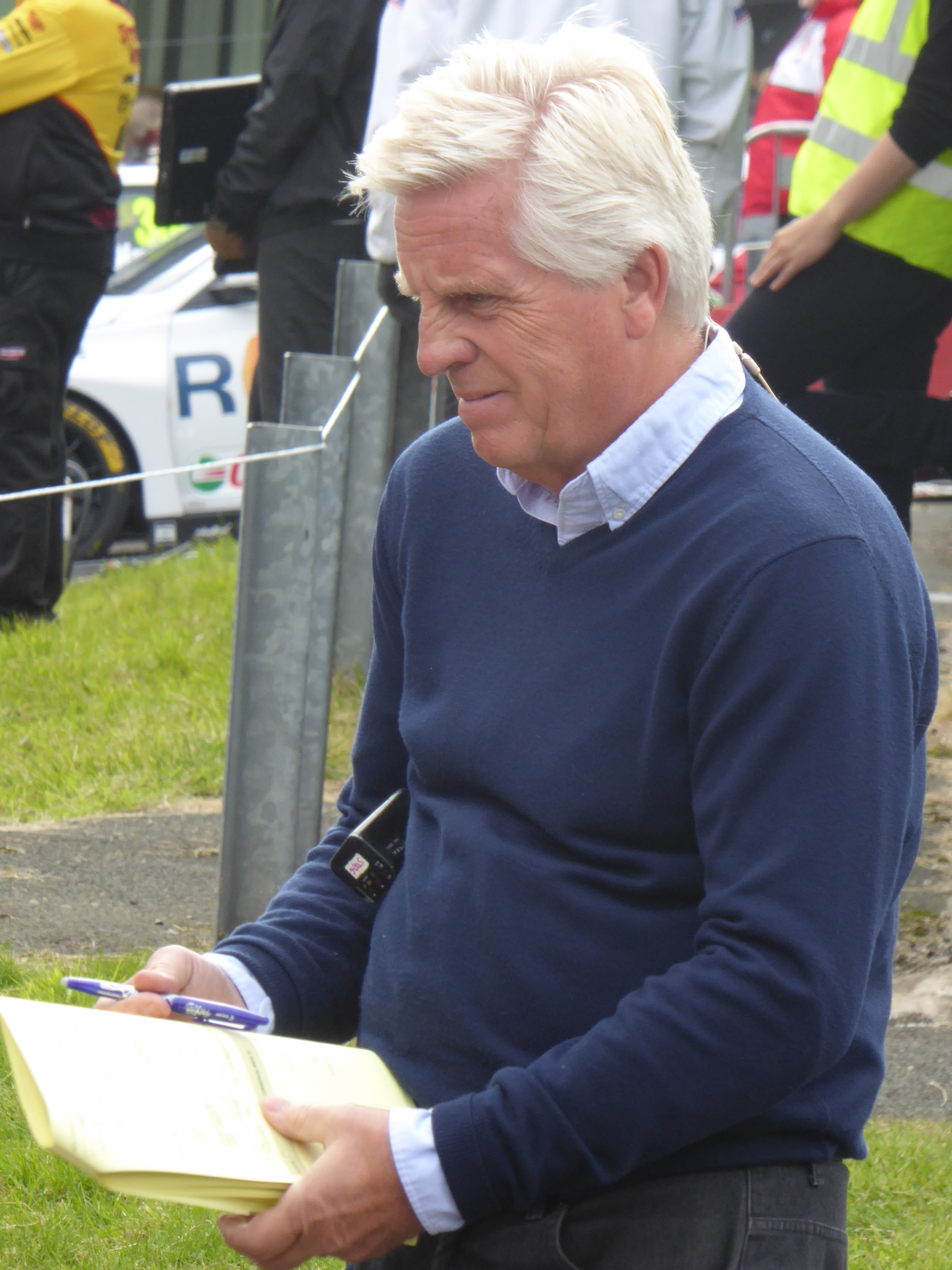
- Rider in 2017
- Born: 28 April 1950 (age 76); Dartford, Kent, England
- Occupation: Broadcaster
- Years active: 1980–2025
- Employer(s): ITV (1980–85; 2006–2025); BBC (1985–2005); BSkyB (2012–2014)
- Spouse: Jane Eydmann (m. 1985)
- Children: 2

Steve Rider (born 28 April 1950) is a retired English sports presenter. Between 1985 and 2005, Rider presented a variety of BBC Sport programmes including Sportsnight, Rally Report and Grandstand. He was the anchorman of ITV's football coverage between 2006 and April 2010, and anchored ITV's Formula One coverage from 2006 to 2008. He was the lead presenter for ITV's coverage of the 2011 Rugby World Cup in New Zealand. From 2009 to 2025, he was ITV's main presenter for the British Touring Car Championship. He announced in May 2025 that he would be retiring from presenting in June 2025.

== Early life and education ==
Born in Dartford, Kent, Rider attended the John Roan Boys' Grammar School on Maze Hill in Blackheath. He began his career working for a newspaper in south-east London, the South East London Mercury, followed by writing for sports news agency Hayters.

== Broadcasting career ==
=== ITV ===
Early in his career he was a sports reporter for LBC and also covered motor racing for Anglia Television, who he joined full time in 1977. In 1979 he became the presenter for Anglia's local ITV football highlights show Match of the Week. He hosted the programme from the 1979–80 season until the end of weekly regional football highlights on ITV at the end of the 1982–83 season. Later he became Head of Sport on the regional news programme About Anglia.

Rider got his big break reporting from the 1980 Summer Olympics for ITV, after the regional companies could not decide who of their senior reporters should to go to Moscow. He worked for both ITV Sport and ITN for several years providing reports for, and occasionally anchoring, the World of Sport programme and presenting for ITV's coverage of the 1982 World Cup. While anchoring World of Sport he was reprimanded for making a flippant remark about a wrestler, who had broken his collarbone, for not reading the script properly. He was also a presenter for some of the golf coverage on Channel 4 and presented some live European football for ITV.

=== BBC ===
Rider joined BBC Sport in July 1985, and his first role was to replace Harry Carpenter on the network's Sportsnight programme, which he presented for six years. In 1991 he became the main presenter of Grandstand, having previously deputised for Des Lynam. He also co-presented BBC Sports Personality of the Year and anchored most of the BBC's motorsports, rugby and golf coverage. Rider, along with Murray Walker and Tiff Needell, convinced the BBC to show regular coverage of the British Touring Car Championship and the British Formula 3 Championship on Grandstand. Rider was anchoring BBC's Formula 1 coverage when Ayrton Senna lost his life at Imola, where he described Senna's condition just after the accident as grave.

He also anchored the channel's coverage of the University Boat Race until 2005, every Olympic Games between 1988 and 2004 and every Commonwealth Games between 1986 and 2002. In 1996 ITV attempted to recruit Rider, when it was announced that Formula One coverage would move from the BBC to ITV. However, he chose to remain with the BBC and the ITV F1 frontman role was handed to Jim Rosenthal. In addition to sport, Rider also presented BBC's coverage of the London International Boat Show. His last assignment for the corporation came at the World Rowing Championships in Japan in the autumn of 2005. He was succeeded by Gary Lineker and Hazel Irvine in golf, John Inverdale for the rowing and rugby union and Clare Balding for rugby league.

In 2006 Rider said of the rumoured cancellation of Grandstand:

It was always felt to be a fundamental gesture about (BBC) commitment to sport if Grandstand were to be abolished

Rider was also critical of the BBC's selection of Gary Lineker to present golf:

For four years, the R&A and most other observers knew that Gary was the wrong man for the job. Golf presentation especially at Augusta, is seat of the pants, unpredictable and demanding

=== Return to ITV ===
In September 2005 it was reported that ITV had secured Rider's services and he would replace Jim Rosenthal from 2006 onwards to present coverage of Formula One. He later said that a factor in his decision to move network was the BBC's unwillingness to agree his long-term future. He told The Times,

I went...to the BBC and said Look, you know me as a presenter, you know the way I work, the way I want to work, I want to make a long-term commitment to encompass 2012. They did not feel able to do that and it was easy to make a decision [about my future] from that point on.

In March 2006 Rider made his coverage debut on ITV, appearing on a Formula One preview show for the new season. Later that year he was chosen over Gabby Logan to be the main presenter of ITV's coverage of the 2006 World Cup.

ITV's early withdrawal from its F1 contract was announced on 24 November 2008, handing the coverage back to the BBC. Rider commented on the contract cancellation,

But the explanation when it came was cold and brutal. At ITV, overall advertising revenue had taken a dive as the recession drew closer, and in terms of sports rights, the company had to prioritise its targets. [..] In order to pay for the [Champions League football] bid, something had to go. Formula One.

Rider was not offered a contract to return to the BBC in 2009. The anchorman duties on BBC Sport were given to Jake Humphrey.

Rider started to present coverage of the British Touring Car Championship in 2009, which he continued to host until 2025. Rider said of the BTCC in 2012,

The viewers not only have a wide variety of car to look forward to but also, in 2012, the increased spectacle that the latest Next Generation Touring Car regulations will bring with turbocharged engines and flaming exhausts,” he said. “In some ways it's taking an element of the iconic RS500 days with their turbos and performance in the early Nineties – an era which people still recall with great affection – and adding it to the modern-day BTCC with its many great different makes and models of car.

With Adrian Chiles's arrival as the channel's main football anchor in May 2010, it was announced that Rider was leaving ITV. His last presenting role as the football anchor on ITV was the 2010 Champions League semi-final between Lyon and Bayern Munich. However, he returned as the main presenter of ITV's coverage of the Rugby World Cup 2011.

=== Sky ===
In December 2011, it was announced that Rider had joined Sky Sports to present F1 Legends for Sky Sports F1; the channel debuted in March 2012.

=== Other work ===
Rider was the main host of the Autosport Awards for 28 years before stepping down in 2017.

Rider set up Racing Past Media, and in 2022 agreed a deal with ITV to organise and make available significant volume of F1 coverage from the first 30 years of the sport.

=== Books ===
In 2003 he wrote the official BBC book, BBC Sports Personality of the Year – a 50-year history of the awards programme. Rider further released his 2006 book Europe at the Masters, which was an insight into European success at the Major event. During 2012, Rider released his autobiography My Chequered Career: Thirty-five years of televising motorsport.

=== Retirement ===
In an interview with Talksport in May 2025, Rider announced that he would be retiring in June 2025. His last broadcast was the fifth round of the 2025 British Touring Car Championship at Oulton Park. In his interview he joked: "It'll be smoother than Gary Lineker's exit."

== Broadcasting style ==
On his style, he has said

[I'm not] that bothered about the environment that should surround a presenter at the beginning of a programme, of the "if we get you in this location it will look as though you are close to the action" sort of thing. That is meaningless for an audience, it is just a macho thing for a production team. We used to have these discussions: wouldn't it look great if you were standing by the 18th green as Nick Faldo putted out and you would say "No, that would get in the way of everybody's enjoyment of the event".

Punch magazine said of Rider on Grandstand in 1985: "Young Steve Rider is as scrubbed and gleaming as a Colgate ad."

In 2000, Rider was described as TV's Mister Charisma by the industry publication Broadcast. At the 2006 Royal Television Society Television Sports Awards, Grandstand won the Judges Awards with Steve Rider called "Mr Calm". In 2007, The Telegraph said Rider's presenting style had the "unflustered air of a man opening his morning paper". However, Rider was criticised in 2009 by Charlie Brooker, who called him "the blandest of the lot".

=== Bloopers ===
Rider said his biggest blooper was at the 1988 Summer Olympics where he said,

Welcome to Olympic Breakfast. The big news of the morning is that Ben Johnson's urine sample tasted positive

Another blooper was when he said,

If you don't want to know the result, look away now as we show you Tony Adams lifting the cup for Arsenal

== Awards ==
Rider has twice won the Royal Television Society's Sports Presenter of the Year award, in 1994 and 1996, as well as being nominated on numerous occasions. At the 2004 RTS Sports Television Awards, the BBC coverage of the Coxless Fours at the Athens Olympics was awarded Sports Programme of the Year which was described as having "superb contributions from Steve Rider and Sir Steve Redgrave in particular." Rider won a BAFTA TV award for ITVs coverage of the 2008 F1 Brazilian Grand Prix.

== Personal life ==
Rider has two children with his wife Jane. The family have a second home in East Portlemouth, Devon. It was reported in 2009 that Rider was one of a number of people who had objected to the building of affordable housing within East Portlemouth. The objections were quashed by South Hams council. Rider said he was supportive of affordable housing, but the location of East Portlemouth was "not appropriate", stating it threatened the community's "peace and solitude".

Rider supports Charlton Athletic.

In October 1985, Rider navigated for Pentti Airikkala at the final round of the Audi Sport National Rally, where they finished top of Class 4 in an Vauxhall Astra GTE. He had previously navigated for Harry Hockly in a Vauxhall Nova in the 1984 rally.

In November 2007, a birthday party held by Rider for his son Jack at Wycombe Air Park was disturbed when a canister of CS gas was set off. The building was evacuated and police initiated an investigation. Rider said of the alleged gas attack: "We are confident it was not one of the guests as they were all behaving themselves very well indeed."

In October 2023, Rider stated on BBC Breakfast that he was receiving treatment for prostate cancer. In January 2025, Rider said that he had only been tested after a friend had been diagnosed. In his interview with the BBC, he confirmed that it had been caught early and had not spread.

== Charity interests ==
Rider is patron of the South Buckinghamshire charity Headway South Bucks, which raises money for people with head injuries, and also of children's cancer charity CLIC Sargent. He is also vice-president of United Response, a national charity that supports people with learning disabilities, physical and mental health needs.

Rider has also become the patron of Children and Families Across Borders (CFAB), a charity dedicated to reuniting children who have been separated from their families. Since 2008 Rider has been the patron of Exeter Leukaemia Fund. In addition, Rider is vice-president of the DEBRA Golf Society, which raises funds for individuals and families affected by epidermolysis bullosa (EB) – a painful genetic skin blistering condition which, in the worst cases, can be fatal.

Rider has run the London Marathon on numerous occasions for charity, including Action Research and the Seve Ballesteros Foundation.
