= Tony Jardine =

English rally driver and motorsport pundit

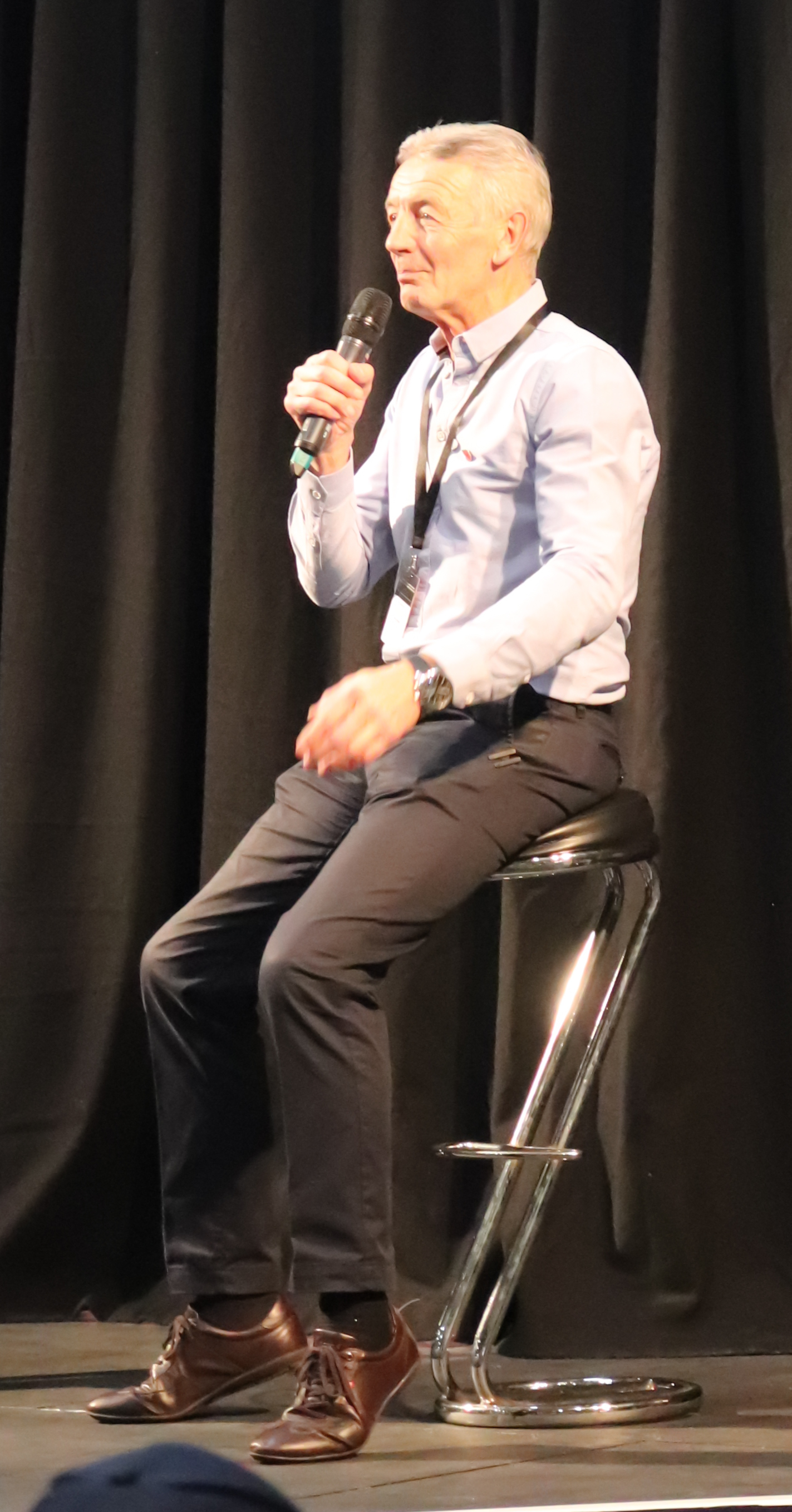
- Jardine at the 2018 NEC Classic Car Show
- Born: Anthony Thomas Jardine; 5 March 1952 (age 74); Liverpool, Merseyside, England
- Occupations: Motorsport journalist, commentator Public relations
- Employers: Brabham; McLaren; Team Lotus; ITV

Anthony Thomas Jardine (born 5 March 1952) is an English rally driver, motorsport pundit and former Formula One (F1) assistant team manager. He has done broadcasting work as an F1 pit lane reporter for the BBC and as a pundit for ITV in its television coverage of the sport from 1997 to 2005. Jardine has worked with the Brabham, McLaren and Team Lotus teams and run his own sports public relations company. He has competed in rallies on both an amateur and a semi-professional basis.

== Early life ==
Jardine was born on 5 March 1952, at Oxford Street Maternity Hospital in Liverpool, England. He is the son of the Royal Navy pilot Eric Percy Jardine. His family moved to South Africa when he was an infant, before returning to Wirral, Merseyside, when he was nine years old. Jardine and his family returned to England in 1962 upon the death of his father.

== Motorsport career ==
Following his leaving the University of Warwick where he studied psychology and sociology, and majored in art, Jardine began his career as a art teacher for a year at Woodchurch High School in Bebington, and for one year, he was head of the art department at the New English School in Kuwait. He later became a political cartoonist for the Kuwait Times, working in the evenings. His motorsport career started in single seater racing cars, raising the money to go racing by working on holidays and on both building sites and in bars. He was competing in a Palliser Formula Ford car in 1973. While in Kuwait, he took up rally driving for the local Datsun importers in his spare time after an accident in which he crashed his own Formula Ford car meant he was unable to pay for it to be repaired. He was comparatively successful, finishing eighth on the Kuwait International Rally in 1975. He discovered the lack of funding prevented him from getting more involved in racing.

Outside his later Formula One (F1) management career, Jardine has continued to race in rallying on an amateur and semi-professional basis, mainly in the United Kingdom but also overseas. Jardine has competed in four Arctic Rallies and 27 Wales Rally GBs, finishing second in class in 2001. He was a three-time recipient of the journalists' award. Jardine also tested a Tyrrell 026 at Donington Park in 1998. He competed in the 2013 Wales Rally GB and the 2016 Wales Rally GB with co-driver Amy Williams, the Winter Olympic gold medallist.

== Formula One career ==
Jardine decided to leave his teaching job and moved into F1 by earning a HGV1 truck drivers license. He got a job working for Goodyear's Grand Prix Team, driving trucks and fitting tyres at races across Europe in 1977. He was appointed a temporary engineer by Goodyear, and then his next role was with the Brabham F1 team as its race co-coordinator from October 1977 after an approach from the Brabham family. Jardine worked with racing driver Niki Lauda and designer Gordon Murray in Murray's drawing office through his training in art. After Brabham he moved to McLaren in 1980, being identified and approached to fill the position of Assistant Team Manager to team principal Teddy Mayer at a time when the drivers of the team were Alain Prost and John Watson.

Jardine then left F1 because he had reached the peak within the sport's administration sector to work for an American promotions company to learn about marketing, feeling it would give him some commercial abilities for use within F1's financial sector. However, within eighteen months he was back in F1 working for Lotus through CSS Promotions; colleagues here included racing drivers Nigel Mansell, Elio de Angelis and Ayrton Senna. In 1985 he formed his own sports public relations company, Jardine Communications Ltd, in which future ITV co-presenter Louise Goodman worked. In 2012, Jardine International was taken over by the HPS Group, becoming HPS Jardine. Jardine became the director of communications of the classic rally company HERO/ERA in 2019.

== Media career ==
In 1982, Jardine began working in broadcasting when the commercial radio service Independent Radio News (IRN) were unable to locate their reporter to cover the drivers' strike at the 1982 South African Grand Prix, so Jardine took up those duties. This led to him working for IRN more often and he eventually became its F1 correspondent. Jardine started working for the BBC in the 1980s, including standing in for Murray Walker, as main commentator, at the 1985 German Grand Prix when Walker had a clash between the 1985 British motorcycle Grand Prix and the German Grand Prix and was asked by the BBC to cover the motorcycle event. He was also a race commentator for the South African Broadcasting Corporation.

He presented the 1988, 1989, and 1990 official F1 season review videos produced by the Formula One Constructors' Association. Following the death of James Hunt in 1993, Jonathan Palmer moved to become co-commentator alongside Walker and Jardine became the BBC's full time pit lane reporter. He was the presenter of Opposite Lock on Sky Sports in the 1990s. When the F1 coverage switched to ITV in 1997, he became one of their main pundits, appearing on-screen before and after races. Jardine fulfilled the role until he was dropped by ITV after the 2005 season. He covered A1 Grand Prix and has also done broadcasting for the pay-TV broadcaster Sky TV, Sky Sports News previewing each F1 Grand Prix in the Sky studio, Talksport, TalkTV and BeIN Sports, analysing F1 races for Africa and the Middle East.

== Personal life ==
He also does a considerable amount of after-dinner speaking for clients including Toyota, Heineken and Toshiba. In 2007, Jardine's wife Jeanette was badly injured in a car crash, in which she was an innocent bystander. She had to have her right arm amputated. The couple have been married since October 1978.
