= 2008 Brazilian Grand Prix =

Formula One motor race

Coordinates: 23°42′13″S 46°41′59″W

Race 18 of 18 in the 2008 Formula One World Championship
← Previous race	Next race →

Race details
- Date: 2 November 2008
- Official name: Formula 1 Grande Prêmio do Brasil 2008
- Location: Autódromo José Carlos Pace, São Paulo, Brazil
- Course: Permanent racing facility
- Course length: 4.309 km (2.677 miles)
- Distance: 71 laps, 305.909 km (190.083 miles)
- Weather: Rain at beginning and end, otherwise drying

Pole position
Driver	(Brazil) Felipe Massa	Ferrari
- Time: 1:12.368

Fastest lap
Driver	(Brazil) Felipe Massa	Ferrari
- Time: 1:13.736 on lap 36

Podium
First	(Brazil) Felipe Massa	Ferrari
Second	(Spain) Fernando Alonso	Renault
Third	(Finland) Kimi Räikkönen	Ferrari

The 2008 Brazilian Grand Prix (formally the Formula 1 Grande Prêmio do Brasil 2008) was a Formula One motor race held on 2 November 2008 at the Autódromo José Carlos Pace (Interlagos) in São Paulo, Brazil. It was the eighteenth and final race of the 2008 Formula One World Championship. Ferrari driver Felipe Massa won the 71-lap race from pole position; this was the last of Massa's 11 Grand Prix wins. Fernando Alonso finished second in a Renault, and Massa's teammate Kimi Räikkönen finished third.

Massa started the race alongside Toyota driver Jarno Trulli. Massa's teammate Räikkönen began from third next to McLaren driver Lewis Hamilton. Rain fell minutes before the race, delaying the start, and as the track dried Massa established a lead of several seconds. More rain late in the race made the last few laps treacherous for the drivers, but could not prevent Massa from winning the Grand Prix. Sebastian Vettel of Toro Rosso finished in fourth place behind Alonso and Räikkönen. Hamilton passed Toyota's Timo Glock in the final corners of the race to finish fifth, securing him the points needed to take the Drivers' Championship.

Hamilton received praise from many in the Formula One community, including former champions Damon Hill and Michael Schumacher. The McLaren driver also received official congratulations from Queen Elizabeth II and British prime minister Gordon Brown. Massa's win and Räikkönen's third place helped Ferrari win the Constructors' Championship. The Grand Prix was 13-time Grand Prix winner David Coulthard's final race; the Scot retired after 246 race starts.

== Background ==
The 2008 Brazilian Grand Prix was the 18th and final round of the 2008 Formula One World Championship and was held on 2 November 2008, at the 4.309 km (2.677 mi) Autódromo José Carlos Pace, in São Paulo, Brazil. Heading into the final race of the season, McLaren driver Lewis Hamilton was leading the Drivers' Championship with 94 points; Ferrari driver Felipe Massa was second with 87 points, seven points behind Hamilton. A maximum of ten points were available for the final race, which meant that Massa could still win the title if Hamilton finished in sixth place or lower. Otherwise, Hamilton would be champion. In the event of a points tie, Massa would win the championship on a count-back, having more wins. Behind Hamilton and Massa in the Drivers' Championship, Robert Kubica was third with 75 points in a BMW, and Massa's Ferrari teammate Kimi Räikkönen was fourth with 69 points.

In the Constructors' Championship, Ferrari were leading with 156 points and McLaren–Mercedes were second with 145 points, 11 points behind, with a maximum of 18 points available. If the two Ferrari drivers finished in the top six, the team would secure the Constructors' Championship, even if the McLaren drivers were to finish as the top two. Prior to this race, Hamilton was criticised by many pundits for not maintaining his composure at the Japanese Grand Prix. The Times columnist Edward Gorman said that Hamilton should win the championship, but commented:

Alternatively Hamilton may suffer another one of his rushes of blood to the head and do something utterly unnecessary at Interlagos, just as he did in Japan eight days ago and in Brazil last year, and throw it all away ... Suddenly defending even a seven-point lead sounds a tall order.

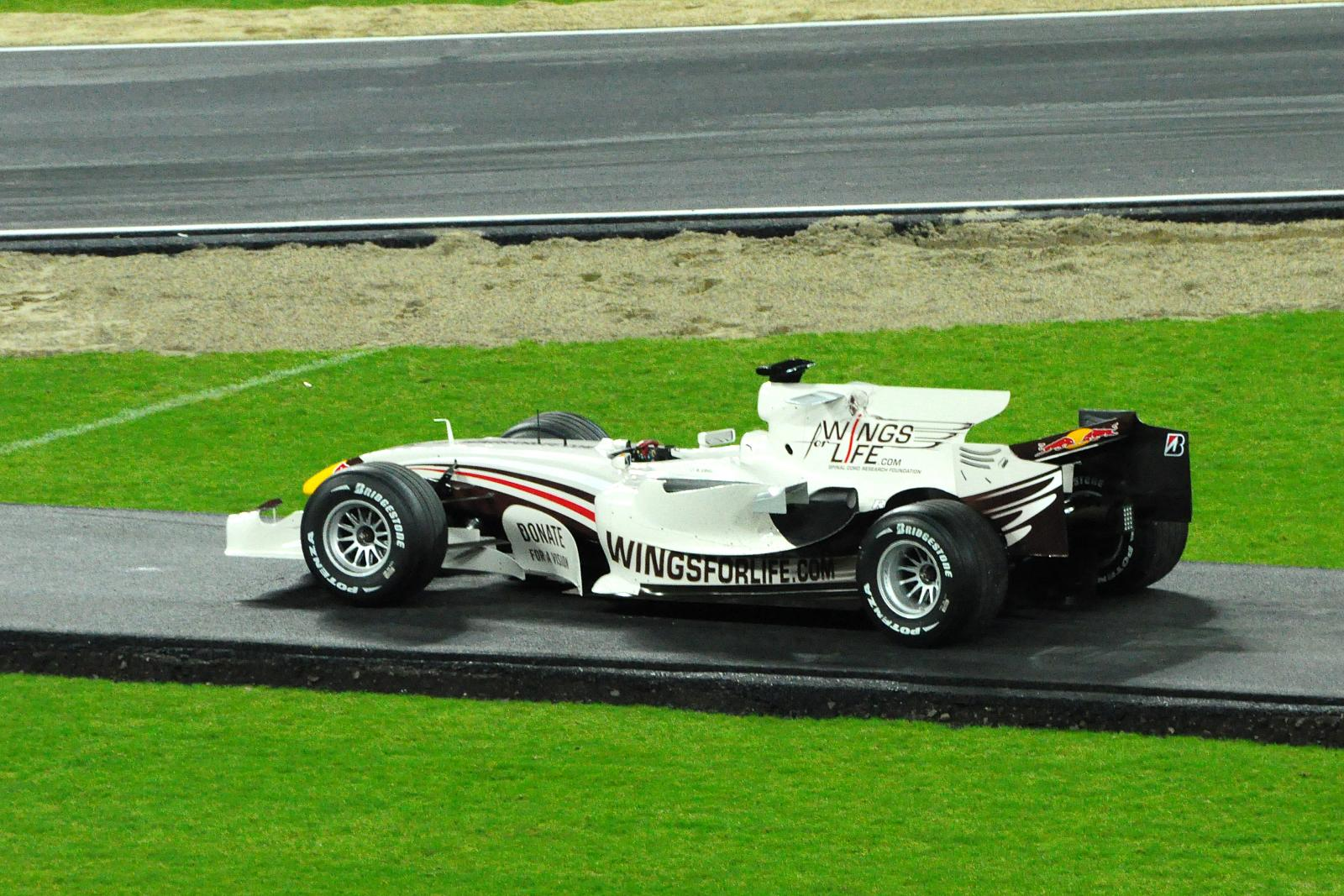
David Coulthard's car from the 2008 Brazilian Grand Prix, pictured at the 2008 Race of Champions

Former Formula One team owner Eddie Jordan created controversy when he said that "if Massa tries to take him out as he did in Japan in order to steal the title then Lewis has to be ready for it", adding: "If he tries that on then Lewis has to turn his wheel into Massa to ensure he does not finish the race either – he has to take his wheel off." Both Hamilton and Massa rejected the comments, with Massa saying: "Playing dirty has never been part of my game. I don't want anything to do with it. The only thing on my mind is winning the race."

The weekend marked David Coulthard's final race. Coulthard's Red Bull RB4 was decorated in the colours of "Wings for Life", a charity dedicated to raising awareness of spinal cord injuries. Coulthard said: "I'm dedicating my last race to the vision of making paraplegia curable." Red Bull Racing received approval from the Fédération Internationale de l'Automobile, Formula One's governing body, to run Coulthard's car in different colours than his teammate Mark Webber. This was the last Formula One race broadcast by ITV in the United Kingdom and Telecinco in Spain; the rights went to the BBC and La Sexta, respectively, for 2009. It was also the last race for the Honda team before they withdrew from Formula One due to the 2008 financial crisis.

=== Championship permutations ===
After losing the championship to Kimi Räikkönen by one point at the same venue the previous season, Hamilton found himself in his second championship battle in just his second season. Prior to the race, he led the championship by seven points from Massa, meaning that he only needed a fifth place to succeed. If he won the championship, he would become the youngest World Drivers' Champion aged 23 years and 300 days. Meanwhile, Massa also had the opportunity to win his first drivers' championship and become the first Brazilian World Champion since Ayrton Senna in 1991.

The championship would have been won by either of the top two drivers in the following manners:

	Hamilton would have won if:	
	(United Kingdom) Lewis Hamilton	(Brazil) Felipe Massa
Pos.	5th or better	Any position
Pos.	6th	2nd or lower
Pos.	7th	2nd or lower
Pos.	8th	3rd or lower
Pos.	lower than 8th	3rd or lower

	Massa would have won if:	
	(Brazil) Felipe Massa	(United Kingdom) Lewis Hamilton
Pos.	1st	6th or lower
Pos.	2nd	8th or lower

== Practice ==
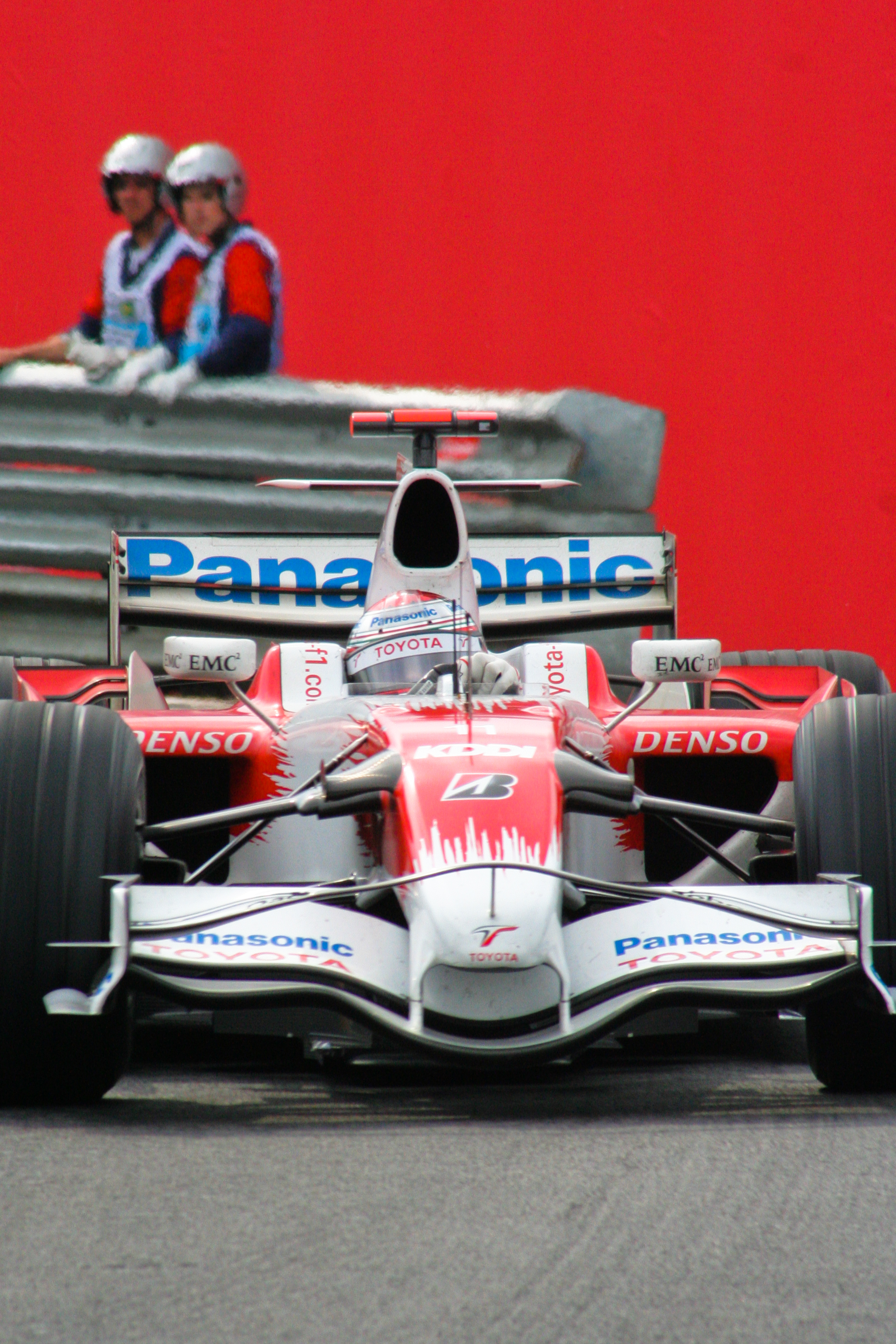
Jarno Trulli qualified in second for Toyota

Three practice sessions were held before the race; the first on Friday morning and the second on Friday afternoon. Both sessions lasted 90 minutes. The third session was held on Saturday morning and lasted an hour. The two sessions on Friday were affected by occasionally damp conditions, which made the track moderately slippery. Massa was quickest with a time of 1:12.305 in the first session, less than two-tenths of a second faster than Hamilton. Räikkönen was just off Hamilton's pace, followed by Kubica, Heikki Kovalainen, and Fernando Alonso. Webber was seventh, still within a second of Massa's time. In the second practice session, Alonso was fastest with a time of 1:12.296, less than six-hundredths of a second quicker than second-placed Massa. Jarno Trulli took third place, ahead of Räikkönen, Webber and Sebastian Vettel. Hamilton only managed ninth place, locking his McLaren's wheels and struggling for grip. Kovalainen was only quick enough for fifteenth position. The Saturday morning session was held on a much warmer track, which reached temperatures as high as 36 °C (97 °F). Alonso was again quickest, posting a time of 1:12.141, narrowly faster than both McLaren drivers. Massa, Vettel, and Nick Heidfeld rounded out the top six positions. Räikkönen only managed twelfth, failing to improve on his times set early in the session.

== Qualifying ==
The qualifying session on Saturday afternoon was split into three parts. The first part ran for 20 minutes and eliminated the cars from qualifying that finished the session 16th or lower. The second part of qualifying lasted 15 minutes and eliminated cars that finished in positions 11 to 15. The final part of qualifying determined the positions from first to tenth, and decided pole position. Cars which competed in the final session of qualifying were not allowed to refuel before the race, and therefore carried more fuel than in the previous sessions.

Tomorrow, I will be focusing on my own race: it will be a tough afternoon but I'm comfortable with the fuel strategy we chose; the guys in front are probably on a different strategy. But we're in a good position to finish in the same place as we are today – and that's got to be our aim. We don't need to do anything spectacular.

— Lewis Hamilton, following the third qualifying session.

Massa clinched his sixth pole position for the season, and his third consecutive pole at Interlagos, with a time of 1:12.368. He was joined on the front row of the grid by Trulli, in his best qualifying performance of the season. Räikkönen qualified third, though he was happy with beginning the race on the racing line behind his teammate. Hamilton qualified fourth, half a second behind Massa, having battled both Ferrari drivers for time during the first two qualifying sessions. Hamilton's slow pace in the final qualifying session compared to the first two suggested he was carrying more fuel than his title challengers. Hamilton's teammate Kovalainen qualified fifth. Alonso, Vettel, Heidfeld, Sébastien Bourdais and Timo Glock rounded out the top ten. Kubica only managed 13th, having struggled with overall grip for much of the day. Coulthard, in his final Formula One race, qualified 14th; Rubens Barrichello, in 15th, was quicker than Honda teammate Jenson Button in 17th. The Williams and Force India drivers qualified at the back of the grid, covering positions 16 to 20 with Button.

=== Qualifying classification ===
Pos	No	Driver	Constructor	Q1	Q2	Q3	Grid
1	2	(Brazil) Felipe Massa	Ferrari	1:11.830	1:11.875	1:12.368	1
2	11	(Italy) Jarno Trulli	Toyota	1:12.226	1:12.107	1:12.737	2
3	1	(Finland) Kimi Räikkönen	Ferrari	1:12.083	1:11.950	1:12.825	3
4	22	(United Kingdom) Lewis Hamilton	McLaren-Mercedes	1:12.213	1:11.856	1:12.830	4
5	23	(Finland) Heikki Kovalainen	McLaren-Mercedes	1:12.366	1:11.768	1:12.917	5
6	5	(Spain) Fernando Alonso	Renault	1:12.214	1:12.090	1:12.967	6
7	15	(Germany) Sebastian Vettel	Toro Rosso-Ferrari	1:12.390	1:11.845	1:13.082	7
8	3	(Germany) Nick Heidfeld	BMW Sauber	1:12.371	1:12.026	1:13.297	8
9	14	(France) Sébastien Bourdais	Toro Rosso-Ferrari	1:12.498	1:12.075	1:14.105	9
10	12	(Germany) Timo Glock	Toyota	1:12.223	1:11.909	1:14.230	10
11	6	(Brazil) Nelson Piquet Jr.	Renault	1:12.348	1:12.137		11
12	10	(Australia) Mark Webber	Red Bull-Renault	1:12.409	1:12.289		12
13	4	(Poland) Robert Kubica	BMW Sauber	1:12.381	1:12.300		13
14	9	(United Kingdom) David Coulthard	Red Bull-Renault	1:12.690	1:12.717		14
15	17	(Brazil) Rubens Barrichello	Honda	1:12.548	1:13.139		15
16	8	(Japan) Kazuki Nakajima	Williams-Toyota	1:12.800			16
17	16	(United Kingdom) Jenson Button	Honda	1:12.810			17
18	7	(Germany) Nico Rosberg	Williams-Toyota	1:13.002			18
19	21	(Italy) Giancarlo Fisichella	Force India-Ferrari	1:13.426			19
20	20	(Germany) Adrian Sutil	Force India-Ferrari	1:13.508			20

== Race ==
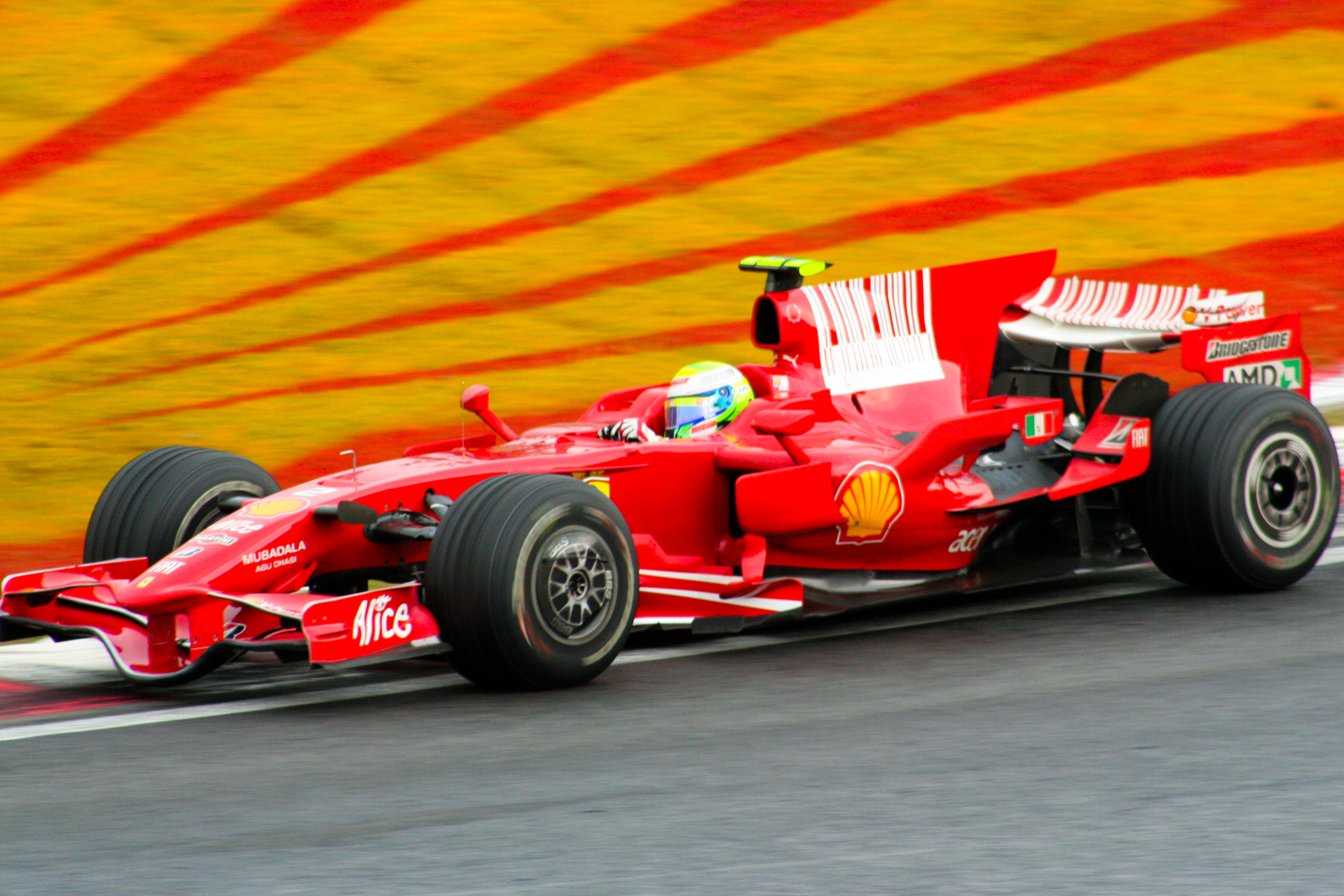
Grand Prix winner Felipe Massa.

The conditions on the grid were damp before the race, the air temperature at 28 °C (82 °F); rain or thunderstorms were expected. The Grand Prix, which had a race day attendance of 149,600, was due to begin at 15:00 local time (UTC-2), but was delayed by ten minutes when heavy rain hit the track at 14:56. Every team but one changed the tyres on both their cars from dry-weather tyres to intermediate tyres. Kubica's car was the exception, remaining on the dry set-up. Following the formation lap, Kubica returned to the pit lane, his team changing the car's tyres to intermediates. This meant the driver would start the race from the pit-lane.

Massa retained his pole position lead into the first corner, followed by Trulli, Räikkönen, Hamilton and Kovalainen. Coulthard was hit from behind by Nico Rosberg into turn two, spinning him around. The Red Bull car then collided with Rosberg's Williams teammate Kazuki Nakajima. This damaged the suspension and forced Coulthard to retire in his final race. Piquet spun off at the next corner, his car hitting the barriers. Kovalainen was passed by Alonso and Vettel mid-lap, dropping him to seventh. The accidents of Coulthard and Piquet prompted the deployment of the safety car at the end of the first lap. The track conditions began to dry early on; Force India's Giancarlo Fisichella was the first driver to stop for dry-weather tyres, pitting at the end of lap two. He remained in 18th position. Racing resumed on lap five when the safety car pulled into the pit-lane. Rosberg and Button both made pit stops on lap seven, each changing to dry-weather tyres. Bourdais, Glock, Adrian Sutil and Nakajima followed a lap later. By lap 11, the rest of the field had changed to dry-weather tyres. Fisichella benefited from pitting the earliest for dry tyres, moving up the order to a high of fifth position.

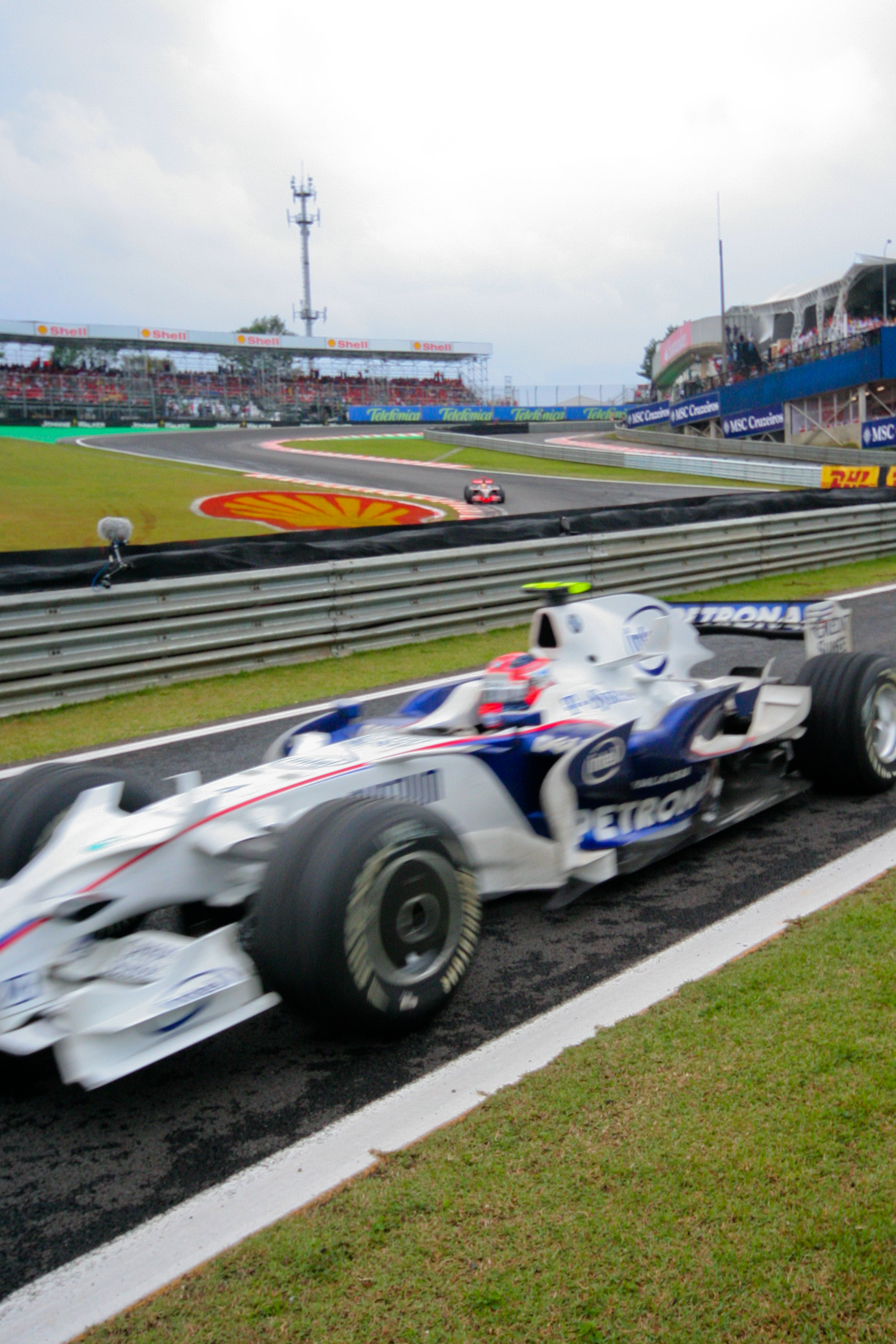
By finishing the race in eleventh place, Robert Kubica ceded third place in the championship to Räikkönen

Nakajima spun on lap 13, losing five seconds on the lap. On lap 15, Massa set a new fastest lap of 1:16.888, and extended his lead over Vettel. Hamilton remained behind Fisichella, and though his McLaren car appeared quicker, he was unable to pass the Force India driver until lap 18. Glock passed Fisichella two laps later. Trulli and Bourdais collided on lap 20 into turn one, sending the Toro Rosso driver across the grass. Bourdais lost six places and rejoined in 13th place. Trulli's Toyota teammate, Timo Glock, passed Fisichella later on in the same lap for sixth. Massa and Sebastian Vettel traded fastest lap times; Vettel's 1:14.214 on lap 25 was surpassed by Massa's 1:14.161 a lap later. However, Vettel made a pit stop soon after, having been lighter-fuelled than his Ferrari opponent. He rejoined in sixth position, behind Glock. Kovalainen passed Trulli and Fisichella in separate manoeuvres, gaining seventh position. On lap 36 Massa set the fastest lap of the race, a 1:13.736.

Timo Glock was fuelled so he could complete the race without stopping again at his pit stop on lap 36. Massa was the first of the championship frontrunners to pit, on lap 38; Alonso and Hamilton made pit stops two laps after. When Räikkönen made a pit stop on lap 43, Massa had regained the lead, ahead of Alonso. Räikkönen rejoined ahead of Hamilton in third place. Fisichella's stop was marred by transmission problems, dropping him to 18th position when he resumed. Vettel made a pit stop again on lap 51, his team fuelling him to the finish. He rejoined in fifth. By lap 54, Massa had extended his already comfortable lead over Alonso to 9.6 seconds. Vettel was closing in quickly on Hamilton, the McLaren driver needing to finish no lower than fifth to win the championship.

ALLEN: [Massa] has done everything he needed to do and we wait now to find out who will be the World Champion of 2008. Can Hamilton do anything? Can he run it up the inside of Vettel? Only a few corners to go now, and desperation starts to creep into Lewis Hamilton.
BRUNDLE: Räikkönen's third and... is that Glock? Is that Glock going slowly?
ALLEN: It is! BRUNDLE: That's Glock!
ALLEN: Oh my goodness me, Hamilton's back in position again! A hundred thousand local hearts sink in the grandstand. It's handed the place back to Hamilton. He comes through, and if I'm absolutely right, I'm sure, he's going to claim fifth place, which is all he needs to do to become the 2008 Formula One World Champion.

— James Allen's and Martin Brundle's commentary of the final few corners.

Light rain began to fall on lap 63. Heidfeld made a pit stop and his BMW pit crew changed his tyres to intermediates, echoing their strategy at the Belgian Grand Prix which had granted the German a podium position. Kovalainen made a pit stop on lap 65; Alonso and Räikkönen made a pit stop a lap later. Hamilton and Vettel halted their battle for fourth position when they came into the pit lane to change onto intermediate tyres on lap 66. Glock chose to remain on his dry-weather tyres and rose from seventh to fourth place as those ahead of him made pit stops. Massa made a pit stop on lap 67, meaning that all of the frontrunners, with the exception of Glock, were now on intermediate tyres.

The rain began to fall heavily on lap 69 and Hamilton ran wide, which allowed Vettel to take fifth position. As Massa crossed the finish line to win the race, Hamilton battled Vettel for the crucial point needed to win the championship. Hamilton did not know of his position upon beginning the final lap and was told over the radio to overtake Glock during the fifth-place battle. Vettel and Hamilton passed Glock in the final corners, the Toyota driver struggling for grip as his dry-weather tyres slid on the wet track. Premature joy in the Ferrari garage soon turned to disappointment as Hamilton finished the race in fifth position, clinching the championship by a single point and becoming Formula One's youngest championship winner until Vettel in 2010. Räikkönen's third-place finish behind Alonso secured Ferrari the constructors' title. After the race, Button's car caught fire in the pit lane.

=== Post-race ===
Before it started to rain I was quite comfortable, and I was just focused on having a clean race. Then it started to drizzle and I didn't want to take any risks – but Sebastian [Vettel] got past me and I was told that I had to get back in front of him. I couldn't believe it. Then at the very last corner I managed to get past Timo [Glock] – it was just amazing. This was one of the toughest races of my life, if not the toughest. I was shouting, 'Do I have it? Do I have it?' on the radio. It was only when I took the chequered flag and got to turn one that the team told me I was world champion. I was ecstatic.

— Hamilton, speaking after the race about the final lap.

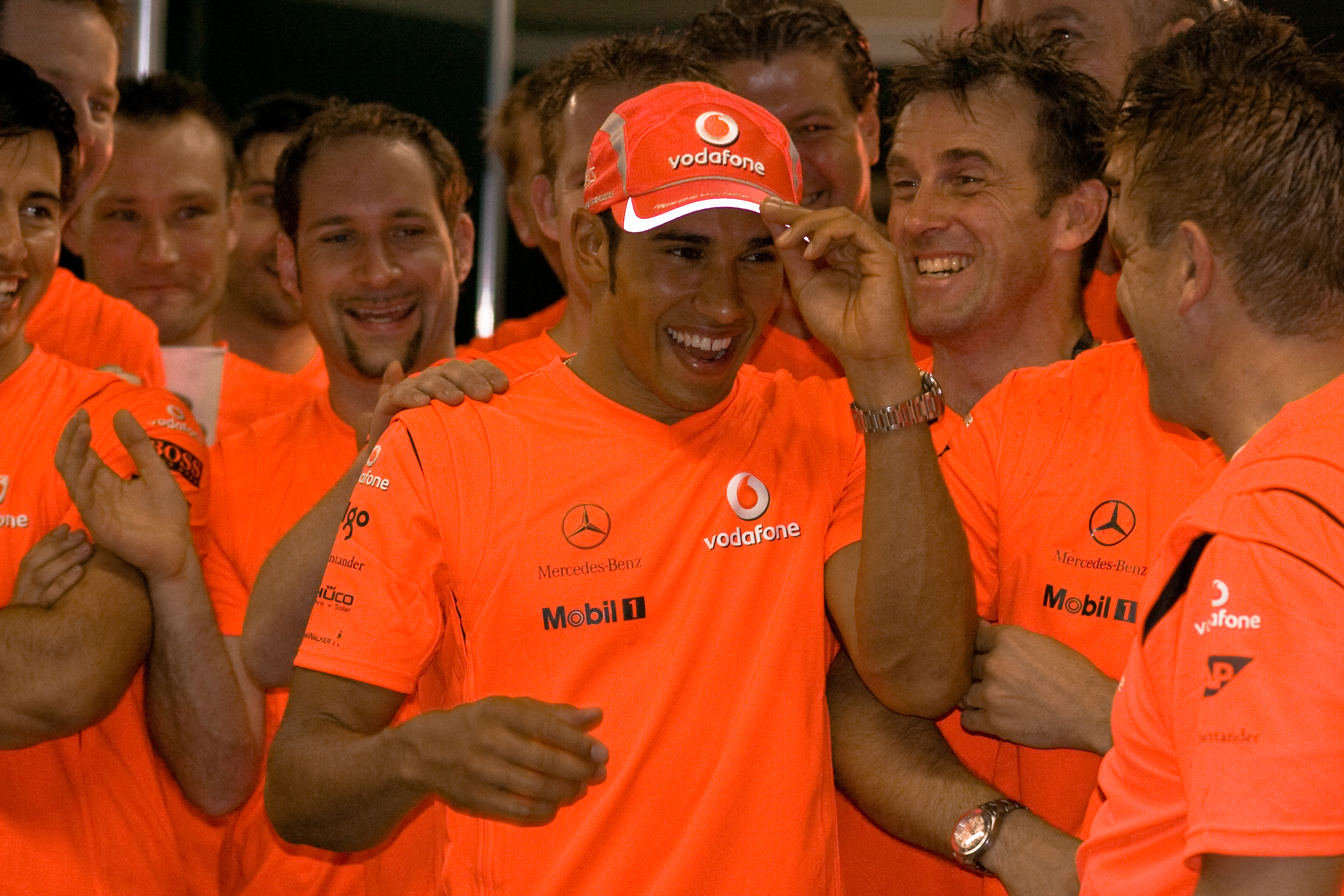
Hamilton celebrating with his team after the race

The top three finishers appeared on the podium and in the subsequent press conference. Massa said that he had "almost done everything perfectly", and expressed his disappointment that despite winning the race he had not won the championship. He gave his congratulations to Hamilton for his title win, commenting:

We need to congratulate Lewis because he did a great championship and he scored more points than us, so he deserves to be champion. I know how to lose and I know how to win and as I said before it is another day of my life from which I am going to learn a lot.

Massa's Ferrari teammate Kimi Räikkönen expressed disappointment in the outcome of the Drivers' Championship, but acknowledged the support of his team, saying "we won at least the team championship". Ferrari president Luca di Montezemolo was reportedly so angry with the result, however, that he destroyed the television he was viewing the race on. McLaren boss Ron Dennis praised Hamilton, saying: "He just keeps delivering and, at the end of the day, he's just two years into his career. So there's a long way to go."

Hamilton received official congratulations from Queen Elizabeth II, following similar plaudits from the prime minister of the United Kingdom Gordon Brown and the Leader of the Opposition David Cameron. Former Formula One champions also congratulated Hamilton. 1996 champion Damon Hill called the McLaren driver "one of the greatest drivers we have had in this country", and multiple champion Michael Schumacher praised both Hamilton and Massa, saying the Ferrari driver's performance indicated his winning abilities. Massa was praised for his sportsmanship after the race, with Joe Saward of GrandPrix.com commenting: "He took defeat with a grace and a style that one rarely sees in modern sport."

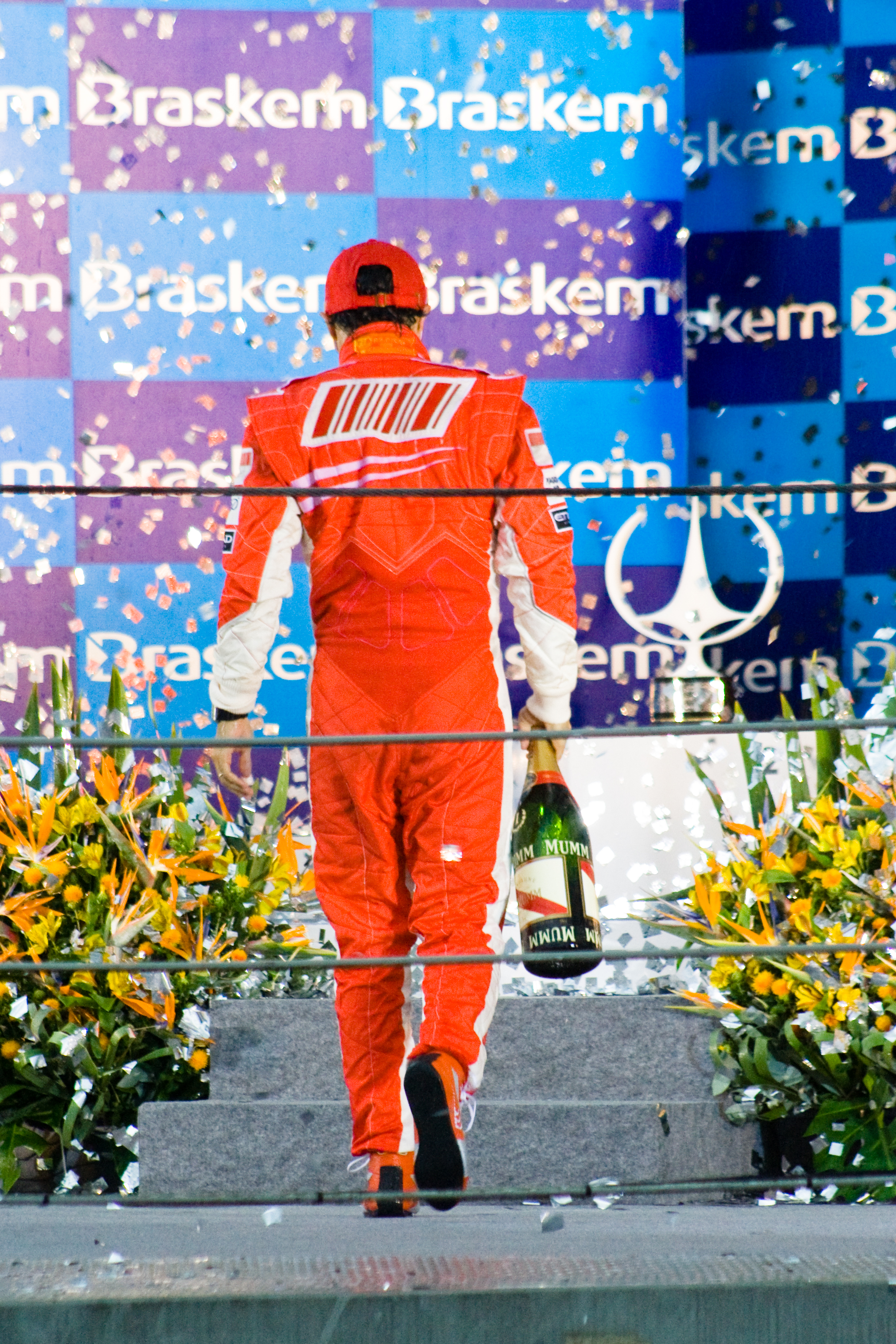
Massa on the podium after the race

Eddie Jordan said that Hamilton "didn't really give himself the best chance of winning the championship – and was very lucky". The former team boss called McLaren's strategy "a disaster". GrandPrix.com expressed disbelief in the outcome: "It was a showdown so improbable that even Hollywood would not have made a film of it. The scriptwriters would have been laughed out of the studios." Autosport magazine writer Adam Cooper called the race "epic". After considering other Formula One title finales, Cooper concluded "nothing has ever matched what we saw [in Brazil]".

Timo Glock remained certain the decision to stay on dry-weather tyres, when other teams were pitting for wet-weather tyres, was a correct one: "We were running seventh before the rain came and we would have probably finished there if it had been totally dry. Instead we finished sixth so that shows the strategy was the right one." Glock added that the conditions were so poor "I didn't even know that Lewis had overtaken me until after the race". His family would receive hate mail from fans and he was particularly heavily criticised by Italian journalists who held the perception that he assisted in helping Hamilton win the championship.

Kubica's finish in 11th position meant that he lost third place in the championship to Räikkönen (on win countback due to Räikkönen having scored two wins during the season to Kubica's one). After the race, Kubica said: "We made too many mistakes during the weekend and this is the result." His team said that they had received the wrong information about track conditions at the start of the race, which led them to keep the Polish driver's car on dry-weather tyres when the rest of the field had changed to intermediates.

David Coulthard expressed his disappointment in his early exit from his final Formula One race, saying: "I'm pretty gutted, it's not how I wanted to end my career." The Scottish driver said that he had planned to perform doughnuts for the crowd, a celebration discouraged in Formula One at the time. Coulthard left Formula One after 15 years with 246 race starts and 13 wins. Red Bull team principal Christian Horner said: "It's a great shame for David to be eliminated from his last Grand Prix at the first corner, but he can look back on a long and illustrious career where he's achieved a great deal." Coulthard continued to work for Red Bull Racing in 2009 as a testing and development consultant.

=== Race classification ===
Pos	No	Driver	Constructor	Laps	Time/Retired	Grid	Points
1	2	(Brazil) Felipe Massa	Ferrari	71	1:34:11.435	1	10
2	5	(Spain) Fernando Alonso	Renault	71	+13.298	6	8
3	1	(Finland) Kimi Räikkönen	Ferrari	71	+16.235	3	6
4	15	(Germany) Sebastian Vettel	Toro Rosso-Ferrari	71	+38.011	7	5
5	22	(United Kingdom) Lewis Hamilton	McLaren-Mercedes	71	+38.907	4	4
6	12	(Germany) Timo Glock	Toyota	71	+44.368	10	3
7	23	(Finland) Heikki Kovalainen	McLaren-Mercedes	71	+55.074	5	2
8	11	(Italy) Jarno Trulli	Toyota	71	+1:08.433	2	1
9	10	(Australia) Mark Webber	Red Bull-Renault	71	+1:19.666	12	
10	3	(Germany) Nick Heidfeld	BMW Sauber	70	+1 lap	8	
11	4	(Poland) Robert Kubica	BMW Sauber	70	+1 lap	PL^{1}	
12	7	(Germany) Nico Rosberg	Williams-Toyota	70	+1 lap	18	
13	16	(United Kingdom) Jenson Button	Honda	70	+1 lap	17	
14	14	(France) Sébastien Bourdais	Toro Rosso-Ferrari	70	+1 lap	9	
15	17	(Brazil) Rubens Barrichello	Honda	70	+1 lap	15	
16	20	(Germany) Adrian Sutil	Force India-Ferrari	69	+2 laps	20	
17	8	(Japan) Kazuki Nakajima	Williams-Toyota	69	+2 laps	16	
18	21	(Italy) Giancarlo Fisichella	Force India-Ferrari	69	+2 laps	19	
Ret	6	(Brazil) Nelson Piquet Jr.	Renault	0	Accident	11	
Ret	9	(United Kingdom) David Coulthard	Red Bull-Renault	0	Collision	14	

Notes

- ^1 – Robert Kubica started the race from the pitlane.

== Final Championship standings ==
Drivers' Championship standings

+/−	Pos.	Driver	Points
	1	(United Kingdom) Lewis Hamilton*	98
	2	(Brazil) Felipe Massa	97
1	3	(Finland) Kimi Räikkönen	75
1	4	(Poland) Robert Kubica	75
1	5	(Spain) Fernando Alonso	61

Constructors' Championship standings

+/−	Pos.	Constructor	Points
	1	(Italy) Ferrari*	172
	2	(United Kingdom) McLaren-Mercedes	151
	3	(Germany) BMW Sauber	135
	4	(France) Renault	80
	5	(Japan) Toyota	56

- Note: Only the top five positions are included for both sets of standings.
- Bold text and an asterisk indicates the World Champions.

Previous race: 2008 Chinese Grand Prix	FIA Formula One World Championship; 2008 season	Next race: 2009 Australian Grand Prix
Previous race: 2007 Brazilian Grand Prix	Brazilian Grand Prix	Next race: 2009 Brazilian Grand Prix
Awards
Preceded by New award	Autosport; Moment of the Year; 2008	Succeeded by 2010 Singapore Grand Prix
