= James Allen (journalist) =

British radio/TV commentator (born 1966)

- Born: 5 November 1966 (age 60); Liverpool, England
- Education: Merchant Taylors' School, Crosby; Oxford University
- Occupations: Journalist, commentator
- Known for: Formula One commentator and journalist

James Allen (born 5 November 1966) is a British former TV commentator and journalist who is the President, F1 at Right Formula, a leading sponsorship company. He was previously President, Autosport Business, and F1 of Motorsport Network. He worked as lead Formula One commentator for ITV from 2000 to 2008, and subsequently as BBC Radio 5 Live's Formula One commentator, Formula One correspondent for the BBC and the Financial Times, and presenter for Ten Sport in Australia. He presented the podcast James Allen on F1 on the Autosport podcast network. Allen has been a trustee of the Grand Prix Trust, F1's benevolent fund, for over 25 years.

== Early life and education ==
Allen was born in Liverpool, England, and was a pupil at Merchant Taylors' School, Crosby, and student of English and Modern Languages at Lady Margaret Hall, Oxford, gaining a master's degree. His father Bill organised the first historic racing championships in the 1970s and sat for many years in the sport's administration, serving as a commission chair on the RAC motor sports council. He was also a professional racing driver who raced for Lotus in the 1960s and was a Class Winner in 1961 at the 24 Hours of Le Mans.

== Career ==
=== Early career ===
Allen started his Formula One career with the Brabham team in 1990. In 1991, he worked with future TV colleagues Mark Blundell and Martin Brundle. He was news editor at Autosport from 1992 to 1994, and in parallel worked as Formula One pit lane reporter for American network ESPN from 1993 to 1996.

=== ITV ===
With Nigel Mansell's move to the Champ Car World Series in 1993, Allen was hired by ITV in 1994 to help present coverage of the season. When ITV gained the rights to broadcast the Formula One championship in 1997, he worked with Chrysalis TV CEO Neil Duncanson to win the production contract and joined the ITV Sport team as pit lane reporter. With Murray Walker unable to commentate at the 2000 French Grand Prix, Allen took over as one of the main commentators alongside Martin Brundle. Walker wound down his career the next year by missing five races (Brazil, Europe, France, Germany, and Japan), all of which Allen covered. ITV had considered trying a number of guest commentators to decide who would be best suited to replace Walker but instead opted to keep Allen on board full-time. He took over permanently after the 2001 United States Grand Prix and commentated on every subsequent Grand Prix while the sport was broadcast on ITV, winning a number of Royal Television Society and BAFTA Awards. The 2007 Canadian Grand Prix was Allen's 100th as a commentator and he did 129 in total in the role. His last commentary for ITV was the 2008 Brazilian Grand Prix when ITV's F1 broadcast contract ended. The race was watched by over 11 million people in the United Kingdom. Allen also wrote "James Allen's Analysis" for the ITV website.

=== BBC ===
Between 2012 and 2015, Allen was the BBC's Formula One correspondent and lead commentator for BBC Radio 5 Live. He edited his own Formula One website providing insight and analysis of the sport and managed a digital media business, working with sponsors and brands in Formula One that leveraged the site. He made an appearance on Celebrity Mastermind, answering questions on Roald Dahl books. He won the competition, with a score of 23 points.

=== Writing ===
Allen has written four books, the first of which was his ghost-written autobiography of Nigel Mansell published by HarperCollins. He has also written two books on Michael Schumacher: Quest for Redemption (also published in paperback as Driven to Extremes) and The Edge of Greatness. In July 2023, he published Ferrari: From Inside and Outside with ACC Art Books.

Allen was the Formula One correspondent of the Financial Times from 1999 to 2026. In this capacity in April 2011, he wrote the first story revealing the plan to create a new all-electric racing series that became known as Formula E.

=== Formula One Management ===
Allen hosted the official Formula One Management World TV Feed interviews post-qualifying and post-race, beginning this role at the 2009 British Grand Prix. He also moderated the official FIA press conference sessions with drivers and team principals during Formula One race weekends from 2009 to 2018. From 2013 to 2020, he served as the moderator of the annual FIA Sport Conference and has become one of the principal moderators of thought leadership events around motorsport.

=== Motorsport Network ===
In 2017, Allen joined the United States-owned Motorsport Network. In April 2018, he moved into an executive role as president of EMEA. In September 2018, he became president, based in London, helping the business to diversify from digital media into e-sports, gaming, and lifestyle motoring. Among other activities, Allen led the Global Fan Survey project in 2021, 2022, and 2023, conducting major surveys with Formula One, IndyCar, FIA World Endurance Championship, and MotoGP in multiple languages, reaching over 350,000 respondents. He hosts the Financial Times Business of F1 Forum events at selected Formula One Grands Prix. In July 2023, the media assets of Motorsport Network, including Motorsport.com in 15 languages, Autosport, and Motorsport-Total were placed into a new company Motorsport Network Media (MSNM), which was acquired by GMF Capital. In August 2023, GMF appointed Allen as president, Motorsport Business, and F1 Liaison and responsible for MSNM's business in Formula One.

Allen created the thought leadership video podcast strand #ThinkingForward in 2020, which ran on all editions of Motorsport.com in fifteen languages. Allen spoke to leaders from across motorsport about topics like sustainability, diversity, and inclusion and future technologies, aimed at giving enthusiasts an understanding of the future direction of the sport. In 2024 he launched a new podcast James Allen on F1 on the Autosport channel, featuring interviews with people who shape the sport with studio analysis from journalists from Autosport and outside. In May 2024 he interviewed Greg Maffei, CEO of Liberty Media, the owners of F1. In 2026 he left the company to take up a new role on the commercial side of the sport as President, F1 at Right Formula, a leading sponsorship agency.

Allen has appeared in many documentary films about motorsport. In 2019, he appeared in the 2019 Formula E film And We Go Green, directed by Fisher Stevens. That same year, he was the executive producer on the feature film Motorsport Heroes written and directed by Manish Pandey, writer of the acclaimed movie Senna. Allen was featured as one of the principal narrative voices in the hit Netflix 2021 documentary film Schumacher, directed by Michael Wech. He was billed as Schumacher's biographer. In 2023, he played a similar role in the Mansell documentary Williams & Mansell: Red 5 made by Wiser Films for Sky. In 2026 he again appeared as one of the main narrative voices in the Netflix documentary Schumacher '94, directed by Christin Freitag.

== Awards ==
Along with former co-commentator Martin Brundle, Allen picked up the Autosport award for best moment of the year that recognised the pair's commentary in the closing moments of the 2008 Brazilian Grand Prix. The Brazil coverage also won a third consecutive BAFTA award for Allen, Brundle, and the ITV team. His website JamesAllenOnF1 was voted "Best F1 Blog" by fans in the annual Silverstone Media Awards in 2012 and 2013. In 2022, Allen was appointed as a judge on the BAFTA Sports Programme of the Year panel.

== Personal life ==
Allen lives in North West London with his wife Pip. They have two adult sons, Enzo and Emerson.
