= Simon Taylor (journalist) =

- Born: 8 August 1944 (age 82)
- Occupations: Motoring and motor sport journalist, Author
- Known for: Chairman Haymarket Magazines
- Children: 2

Simon Taylor (born 8 August 1944) is a motor sports journalist who writes for several publications. Taylor is a writer, historian, radio and TV commentator and a keen loyal supporter of historic racing. He is editor-at-large of Classic & Sports Car magazine. and contributes a monthly column under the title "Full Throttle". He is particularly known for the in-depth interviews of motor sports personalities past and present which he contributed to Motor Sport magazine between 2006 and 2016, under the title "Lunch with...."

== Career ==
Taylor joined the weekly motor racing magazine Autosport straight from university in 1966 as an editorial assistant. In 1967, the magazine was taken over by the Haymarket Publishing Group and he was promoted to editor in 1968, still aged only 23. In 1971, he forsook writing for publishing management, and went on to devise and launch several new magazines, including What Car? in 1973 and Classic & Sports Car in 1982. In 1984, Haymarket purchased Autocar (the world's oldest motoring magazine) from IPC and successfully relaunched it. Taylor's career progressed to become managing director of Haymarket Magazines.

In 1976, he began doing motor race commentaries on radio, and became BBC Radio's Formula 1 correspondent until 1997, when he spent a year as part of ITV's F1 presentation team. He did further motor-racing commentary work for ITV until 2000 including F3000 and FIA GT. For many years he narrated the official Formula One season review videos produced by the Formula One Constructors Association. He retired as chairman of Haymarket Magazines in 2000 and became a freelance writer, mainly about motor sports history.

His two-volume, 528-page history of the HWM team, John, George and the HWMs, was published in 2019. In 2015 he co-wrote Sir Stirling Moss' autobiography Stirling Moss - My Racing Life. He completed and prepared for publication My View from the Pit Wall, the posthumous autobiography of Lotus F1 team manager Peter Warr. Motor Sport Greats in Conversation is a hardback collection of his "Lunch With..." series of articles from Motor Sport. He is also an after-dinner speaker and interviewer at motor sports functions.

He had a small part, playing himself as the English-language BBC commentator, in the 2013 Ron Howard-directed film Rush about the battle between Niki Lauda and James Hunt in the 1976 F1 season, and also helped with editing the film and scripting some of the dialogue spoken by the broadcast commentators in other languages. According to Fraser Masefield Ranking the Top 10 Formula 1 Commentators he takes the number 9 rank in this list.

He is married with two grown-up children and lives in Chiswick, London. He has a small collection of classic cars and competes regularly in historic motor sport with his unique 1950 HWM sports-racing car The Stovebolt Special.
