= Lee McKenzie =

Scottish sports broadcaster

- McKenzie in 2019
- Born: 1 December 1977 (age 48); Ayr
- Occupations: Journalist, presenter
- Employer(s): BBC, Channel 4
- Known for: Motorsport journalism
- Parent: Bob McKenzie
- Website: leemckenzie.tv

Lee McKenzie (born 1 December 1977) is a journalist and presenter who is a reporter and deputy presenter for Channel 4's F1 coverage and Channel 4 Rugby. McKenzie also works on a variety of sports on the BBC and Channel 4, including tennis, rugby and equestrian, as well as the Olympic, Paralympic and Commonwealth Games. McKenzie has also worked as a presenter for the BBC's F1 coverage, Sky Sports and Sky Sports News.

Lee is the daughter of Bob McKenzie, a Daily Express sports journalist for 35 years.

== Broadcasting career ==
McKenzie has presented for ITV, and also launched the horse racing channel At the Races. McKenzie has also presented Lookaround for Border Television, and covered many high-profile stories including the Lockerbie Trial. McKenzie has been a journalist since she was 15 years old. In 2007, McKenzie won the Jim Clark Memorial Award for contributions to motorsport. McKenzie competed in several rounds of the World Rally Championship in 2004, and the Norwegian Mountain rally in 2005.

McKenzie has hosted several programmes, including three seasons of Sky Sports' A1 Grand Prix coverage, as well as the world feed coverage. A lifelong motorsport and "any sports" fan, McKenzie has presented several programmes on ITV, Channel 4 as well as Sky Sports, including the live Sunday afternoon show Speed Sunday and the British Superbike Championship (BSB). In 2006, McKenzie travelled over 150,000 miles (240,000 km) – five times round the world – covering both the Formula One and the A1 Grand Prix.

McKenzie has covered most major sports events from the Rugby World Cup to Wimbledon and the Derby, from Netball, Grand Prix and Football. McKenzie has presented for At the Races, covering horse racing for Sky Sports, and presenting the 6 o'clock news. McKenzie covered many big news stories including the Lockerbie trial. McKenzie starred in a TV advert for Nokia, presenting award ceremonies including Formula One and other events. McKenzie presented for the Sony PlayStation, the F1 Regent Street display in front of 300,000 people and was asked by Nigel Mansell and Carl Fogarty to host the launch of their magazine for whom she was the on-track editor and columnist.

=== BBC ===
From 2009 to 2015, McKenzie was a pit lane reporter on the BBC's Formula One Coverage. She was the main presenter of Inside F1 for BBC News and McKenzie was the lead presenter for the BBC's F1 programme at the Japanese Grand Prix weekend in October 2010 whilst Jake Humphrey presented the Commonwealth Games and presented the Canadian, German and Hungarian Grands Prix in 2012 whilst Jake Humphrey was presenting Euro 2012 and the 2012 Olympic Games. This was the first time a woman had taken on the main anchor role in F1 on British TV.

She was also reported to be on the BBC's shortlist of possible anchors to replace departing host Jake Humphrey for their F1 coverage across the 2013 season. In December 2012 it was announced Suzi Perry would take over the role.

McKenzie started as a presenter on BBC Inspire in April 2014. Since the BBC lost the F1 rights to Channel 4 she has continued to work for the corporation presenting and reporting on the Commonwealth Games, the Olympics, the Winter Olympics, Wimbledon, The Olympia Horse Show, Equestrian, the 6 Nations, the Women's 6 Nations Championships and the Rugby Union Autumn Internationals.

For the Glasgow 2014 Commonwealth Games, McKenzie presented daytime coverage of events for BBC Three. Whilst at the Rio 2016 Olympics, McKenzie presented the equestrian events for the BBC.

Since 2021, in a departure from normal practice (other than at the Singles Finals), McKenzie regularly conducts immediate post-match interviews with winning players in front of the crowd on Centre Court at Wimbledon - rather than off-court under the Royal Box.

It has endeared her to players and fans alike, including Nick Kyrgios as she explained during a wide-ranging appearance on the Fuelling Around Podcast.

“He is fascinating. I did a lot of interviews with him at Wimbledon last year (in 2022). I was the first person on court," she said. "I stood back and actually Nick noticed this and he looked over from his chair and just sort of gave me a little nod and waved me on. That was perfect and I went on and we did a great interview. I just think he respected the fact that I had given him space and we just did this lovely interview.”

She joined co-hosts Jason Plato and David Vitty in a debate about the future of motorsport and whether Formula E would ever be as popular as F1.

McKenzie explained: "I love motorsport. I watch all forms of motorsport, it doesn’t really matter what’s on, I get excited about what it is. And I dip in and out every year, and I will watch Formula E. I’ve got friends who race in it, I’ve got friends who commentate on it, I know the teams, I know the drivers, and I still can’t quite get as excited about it as I would a Formula 1 race. And I don’t know why that is, and I’m hoping that I’m wrong."

=== Channel 4 ===
On 8 March 2016, it was announced that McKenzie would be joining Channel 4's F1 coverage following BBC's decision to no longer broadcast live F1 on TV. She continues to report on races in the same role she used to have on the BBC and presents F1 Meets.. (also known as Lee Meets) as well as practice sessions. She was Channel 4's lead presenter for the 2020 Tuscan Grand Prix and 2021 Azerbaijan Grand Prix. It was announced she would be the presenter for the channel's highlights of the FIA World Endurance Championship after they gained the rights with immediate effect in June 2016.

McKenzie was announced as the channel's main anchor and reporter for the Paralympics Breakfast show for Rio. McKenzie missed the Austrian, British and Hungarian GP in 2017 as she was part of Channel's 4 UEFA Women's Euro 2017 and 2017 World Para Athletics Championships presenting teams. McKenzie also presented highlights from the winter Paralympic games from London as well as being one of the main presenters of the Winter Paralympics Today and Winter Paralympics Highlights.

In 2018 McKenzie co-presented the Paralympic Winter Games in PyeongChang, South Korea. She also became Channel 4's main presenter for Rugby Union and Wales mid-year Internationals, European Rugby Champions Cup For the 2021 Paralympics it was announced McKenzie would be part of Channel 4's small on site team as reporter due to the coronavirus pandemic.

She will again be part of Channel 4's 2024 Summer Paralympics presenting team and its lead commentator for Equestrian.

== Racing career ==
McKenzie competes as an international co-driver in the World Rally Championship. She started after a challenge by ITV to train and become a World Rally Championship co-driver in just three months, and saw her qualifying for an international licence, right through until she won her class at 2004 Wales Rally GB. Since then McKenzie has competed in the Norwegian Rally Championship for the X-Power MG ZR. McKenzie owns and runs a driver management company that looks after drivers from GP2 to World Rally.
