= Murray Walker =

British commentator and journalist (1923–2021)

Murray Walker OBE
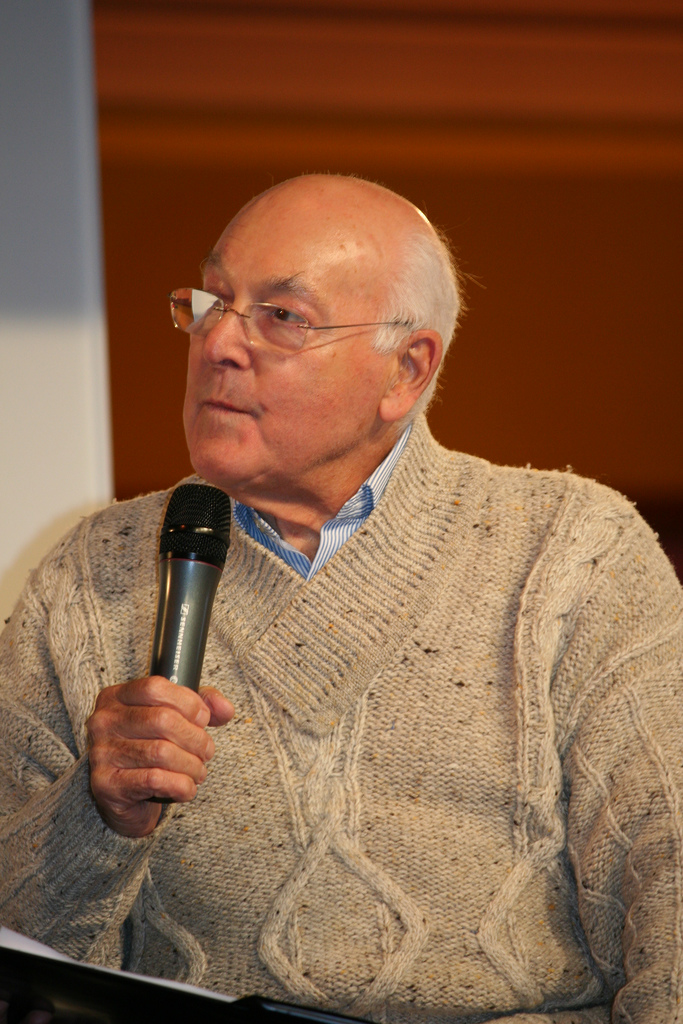
- Walker in 2009
- Born: Graeme Murray Walker; 10 October 1923; Hall Green, Birmingham, England
- Died: 13 March 2021 (aged 97); Fordingbridge, Hampshire, England
- Education: Highgate School
- Alma mater: Royal Military College, Sandhurst
- Occupations: Presenter; commentator; journalist; advertising agent
- Years active: 1948–2020
- Employers: BBC Sport (1963–1996, 2009‍–‍2015); ITV Sport (1997–2001); Channel 4 (2016–2020)
- Spouse: Elizabeth Walker (m. 1960)
- Father: Graham Walker
- Military career
- Branch: British Army
- Service years: 1942–1946
- Rank: Captain
- Service number: 14406224
- Units: Royal Scots Greys, 4th Armoured Brigade
- Conflicts: Battle of the Reichswald

Graeme Murray Walker (10 October 1923 – 13 March 2021) was an English motorsport commentator and journalist. He provided television commentary of live Formula One coverage for the BBC between 1976 and 1996, and for ITV between 1997 and 2001.

During his 23-year run as full-time commentator, Walker became known for his animated enthusiasm, authoritative voice and comical blunders – dubbed "Murrayisms" by fans – during live races. His commentary voice has been likened to a "screech and resembles a 500cc engine being revved up". He retired from full-time commentary after the 2001 United States Grand Prix, but returned to broadcasting part-time in 2005 and made occasional appearances on the BBC, Channel 4, Network 10 and Sky Sports F1.

== Early life ==
Graeme Murray Walker was born at 214 Reddings Lane in Hall Green, Birmingham, England, on 10 October 1923. His family is of Scottish descent. His father Graham Walker was a despatch rider and works motorcyclist for the Norton Motorcycle Company who participated in the Isle of Man TT. His mother, Elsie Spratt, was the daughter of Harry Spratt, a businessman from Leighton Buzzard, Bedfordshire. Walker was an only child. In 1925 Walker and his family moved to Wolverhampton when Graham became the Competition Manager for Sunbeam. The family later moved to Coventry in 1928, when Graham worked as the Sales and Competition Director for Rudge-Whitworth.

Walker's education began with a governess at the family home, followed by spells at preparatory schools around the country. He attended Highgate School, gaining a Distinction in Divinity. While at Highgate he joined the School Corps, learning to play the bugle. Walker was at a trials event with his father in Austria when the outbreak of the Second World War occurred in September 1939. Upon returning to Britain, the Highgate School governors became concerned about the possible extent of bombing raids on London, and so Walker and his fellow pupils were evacuated to Westward Ho! in Devon, staying there until 1941. During this time, Walker rose to the rank of Company Sergeant Major of the School Corps.

Walker was later conscripted into the armed forces and applied to volunteer for tanks, but was required to wait until a training place became available. In the meantime, he worked with the Dunlop Rubber Company, which offered 12 scholarships annually and was based at Fort Dunlop in Erdington, Birmingham. Walker had been evacuated to Erdington and lived with the Bellamy family at 58 Holly Lane. On 1 October 1942 he travelled to Wool in Dorset, where he reported to the 30th Primary Training Wing at Bovington, the headquarters of the Royal Armoured Corps.

Walker later attended and graduated from the Royal Military College, Sandhurst, and was commissioned as a second lieutenant into the Royal Scots Greys on 16 April 1944. The salute at his commissioning parade was taken by American General Dwight D. Eisenhower, the Supreme Allied Commander for the upcoming Allied invasion of Normandy. Walker went on to command a Sherman tank and to participate in the Battle of the Reichswald with the 4th Armoured Brigade. He left the Army in 1946, having attained the rank of captain.

Following the war, Walker briefly followed in his father's footsteps by taking up motorcycle racing, competing against, among others, a young John Surtees. After limited success, he switched to competing in motorcycle trials, where he made a greater mark, including taking a gold at the International Six Days Trial and winning a first-class award at the Scottish Six Days Trial.

After briefly attending Roehampton Technical Institute to study shipping management, Walker worked in advertising for Dunlop and Aspro. He was then headhunted by McCann Erickson, where he worked on the firm's account with Esso. Following this, he was employed as an accounts director by the Masius advertising agency, with clients including British Rail, Vauxhall and Mars, for whom the agency created the slogan "A Mars a day helps you work rest and play"; Walker repeatedly denied the attribution of the slogan to himself, saying that he was only an administrator on the project. He did not make the decision to retire from his job in advertising until 1982, long after he had gained fame as a commentator.

Walker created the slogan "Trill makes budgies bounce with health" – an advertising slogan for bird seed in the 1960s – as well as the slogan "Opal Fruits, made to make your mouth water." He is credited with the naming of the late 1960s Vauxhall Ventora, with the car's original proposed name, Ventura, being rejected by General Motors.

== Career as a commentator ==
Walker made his first public broadcast at Shelsley Walsh hillclimb in 1948. He was given a recorded audition for the BBC at the 1949 Easter Monday Goodwood race. Walker later commentated on races alongside the tennis commentator Max Robertson, with his first radio broadcasting coming at the 1949 British Grand Prix for the BBC. He and Robertson were positioned at Stowe corner for the event. His debut television broadcast came in the same year when he commentated on hill-climbing at the Knatts Valley motorcycle venue in Kent. His first regular broadcasting work was on radio coverage of the Isle of Man annual Tourist Trophy motorcycle race alongside his father. Walker and his father were the single father and son sports commentary pair within the BBC from 1949 to 1962. After the death of his father in 1962, he became the BBC's chief motorcycling commentator.

Walker did occasional Formula 1 commentaries during the 1970s before going full-time for the 1978 season. Walker was asked by the head of BBC Sport Paul Fox to commentate on the Commonwealth Weightlifting Championships in Bristol, and he asked the weightlifter Oscar Slate to educate him on the sport. He covered the 24 Hours of Le Mans in 1967, motocross (initially for ITV and BBC) during the 1960s and rallycross in the 1970s and early 1980s. He occasionally commentated on scrambling (now motocross) motorcycle racing and rallying during the 1960s through to the 1980s. Walker covered the British Touring Car Championship (BTCC) for the BBC between 1969 and 1971 and also 1988 and 1997, and the Macau Grand Prix for Hong Kong TV on nine occasions. He joined the Channel 7 commentary team of the Bathurst 1000 Australian touring car race in 1997 and 1998. As the BBC began to broadcast additional forms of motor racing, he commented on Formula 3, Formula Ford and truck racing.

On Formula One coverage from the 1980 Monaco Grand Prix to the 1993 Canadian Grand Prix, Walker struck up a surprisingly successful, and extremely popular, double act with 1976 World Champion James Hunt. Initially, they did not get on, as Hunt's interests, personality and private life appeared to have little in common with Walker's. However, the pair eventually became good friends. Walker and Hunt were to work together for more than a decade at the BBC, until Hunt's death from a heart attack two days after the 1993 Canadian Grand Prix, aged 45.

When in the commentary booth together, Walker would provide his animated descriptions of the action, with Hunt bringing in his expert knowledge, which included inside information from the pit lane, typically from his former team McLaren, and often opinionated nature, in his co-commentary role. The pair did not always get along in the commentary box. Typically, they had to share one microphone which meant passing it back and forth to each other. On one occasion early in their partnership, Walker would not hand the microphone over after repeated requests by Hunt for him to do so. In frustration, Hunt stood and grabbed the microphone from him, which caused the normally cool Walker to grab the former World Champion by the collar and raise his fist to hit his partner before a producer intervened.

After Hunt died, former F1 driver and BBC pit lane reporter Jonathan Palmer joined Walker in the commentary box until the end of 1996, though in 1993 individuals such as three-time world champion Jackie Stewart took the role as Walker's partner for the 1993 British Grand Prix and 1980 World Champion Alan Jones commented alongside Walker in Australia at the end of the season following a request by Nine's Wide World of Sports. The following year, the television rights of the UK television coverage transferred to ITV, and Walker followed. His co-commentator from the 1997 season until his retirement from commentating was another former F1 driver, Martin Brundle.

Jonathan Martin, the head of BBC Sport, retained Walker's services for the corporation's coverage of the BTCC after the latter's rolling contract expired with them in May 1997. Walker opted not to renew his contract with the BBC in 1998 to focus on ITV's broadcasting on Formula One and he did not want to frequently commute to London to record commentary of the BTCC. There were a few Grands Prix between 1978 and 1996 that Walker did not commentate on while employed by the BBC, usually as a result of his commentating elsewhere. Some of these included the 1979 Belgian Grand Prix and 1988 Hungarian Grand Prix (when Simon Taylor deputised for him), the German Grands Prix of 1981 and 1984 (both commentated on by Barrie Gill), and the 1985 German Grand Prix (Tony Jardine).

In 1988, Walker appeared in two television advertisements opposite actor Eric Idle, who played the part of a salesman attempting to persuade Walker and racing driver Nigel Mansell to purchase an Austin Metro. In 1996, as part of Pizza Hut's global advertising strategy using celebrities, he and Formula One driver Damon Hill advertised the chain's new stuffed-crust pizza. Walker also wrote a series of annuals for the Grand Prix season, Murray Walker's Grand Prix Year. He presented a six-part radio series called "Murray Walker's Grand Prix World" on BBC Radio 5 Live from May to June 1997, detailing the history and development of Formula One. Walker had a column in the F1 Racing monthly magazine.

Walker broke his hip at the 2000 Goodwood Festival of Speed and was replaced for the French Grand Prix by pit lane reporter James Allen. At the 2000 German Grand Prix, Walker erroneously said that Ferrari driver Rubens Barrichello had crashed when it actually was his teammate Michael Schumacher. This led to criticism about his frequent errors in an article published by the Daily Mail on the following day, and it prompted Walker to speak to his bosses at ITV Sport about his future. He told the broadcaster's head of sport Brian Barwick that he would retire. Barwick told Walker he did not believe that retirement was ideal and suggested to Walker he commentate for another season to wind down his career. Walker announced to the press his retirement from Formula One commentary in December 2000. He would commentate on 12 Grands Prix by skipping Brazil, Europe, France, Germany and Japan before continuing to work for ITV in a reduced role entering 2002. Bernie Ecclestone, the owner of Formula One's commercial rights, had suggested to Walker that he commentate on his world feed television coverage, which was declined. His final full-time Formula One television commentary was the 2001 United States Grand Prix and he was awarded an original brick from "The Brickyard" by track president Tony George.

Walker was appointed an OBE in the 1996 Birthday Honours for services to broadcasting and motor sports. In November 1997, Walker was awarded an honorary Doctor of Letters degree from Bournemouth University. He was later honoured, in July 2005, with an honorary doctorate from the Middlesex University, London. He was the subject of This Is Your Life in November 1997. Walker was named the winner of the Gregor Grant Award from the motor racing magazine Autosport in 1993. In 2000, he won the Royal Television Society Lifetime Achievement Award, and was named the recipient of the BAFTA Special Award for Contribution to Television in 2002.

== Later years ==
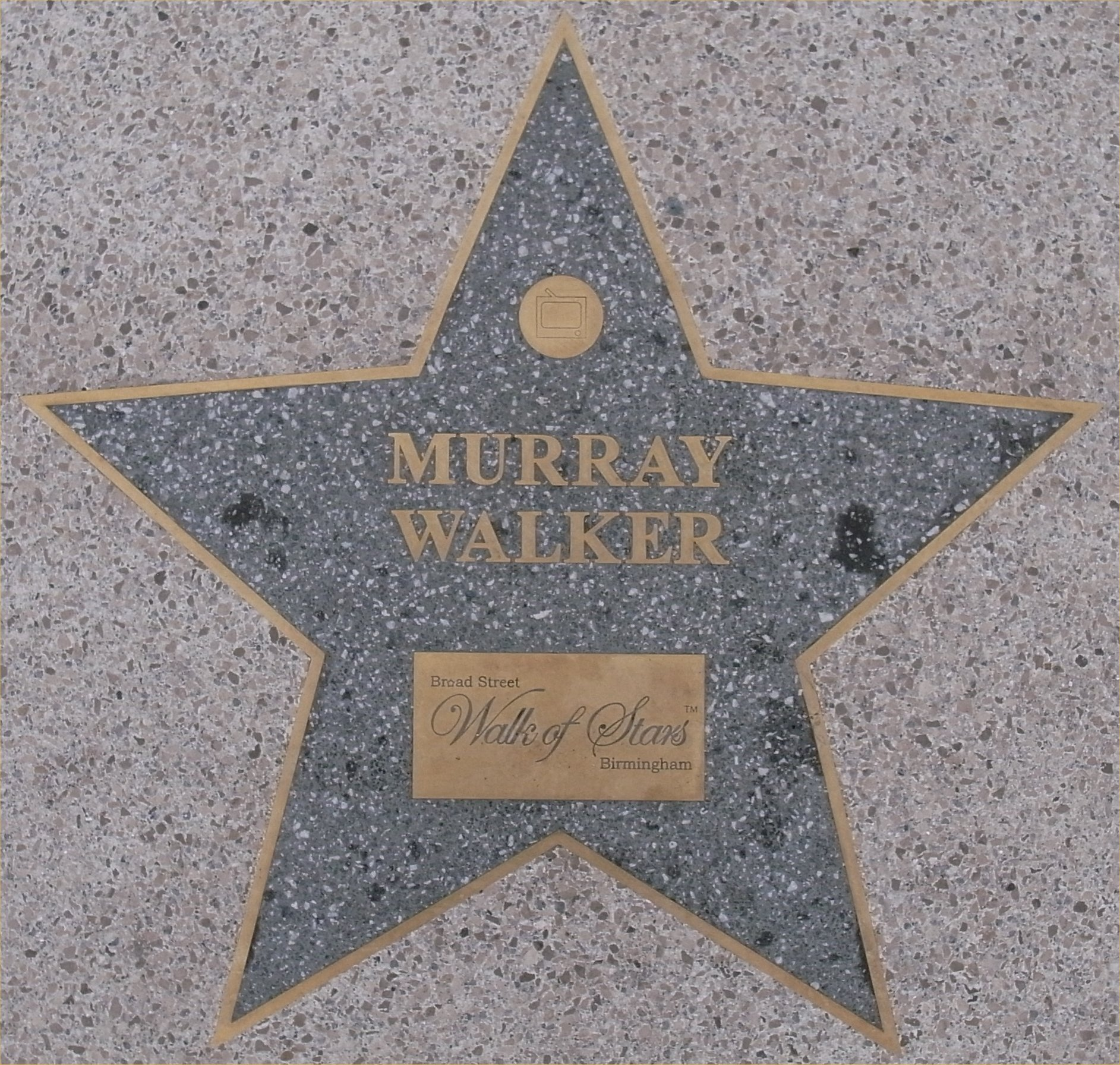
Murray Walker's star on the Birmingham Walk of Stars

Walker ontinued to work in the media as an F1 expert. He was retained by ITV on a part-time role reviewing the 2002 season at various points, and presented the multimedia service, the Murray Walker race review, after each Grand Prix for Orange. Walker's autobiography, Unless I'm Very Much Mistaken, was published in late 2002. He had eight publishers who wanted to put out the book, and he began to compose it in early 2001. Walker negotiated payment of the book sales with the publishers HarperCollins, and he ventured to various worldwide locations to promote it. (Note: One appearance was on the Late Show with David Letterman in late 2002.) He competed in Australia's Targa Tasmania tarmac rally road race as navigator to driver Colin Bond in a Toyota Team Racing-entered Toyota Camry Sportivo in May 2003, finishing second in their class and 44th overall. Walker navigated former Grand Prix competitor Chris Amon in a Toyota Camry Sportivo at the Targa New Zealand that took place five months later, where they finished eighth in their class and 114th outright.

In October 2005, it was announced that Walker would be returning to the microphone as the BBC's voice of the new Grand Prix Masters series. After providing the commentary for the inaugural race in South Africa, in January 2006 BBC Radio 5 Live announced that Walker would be part of their team for their coverage of subsequent races. He also conducted interviews and special features for the radio station throughout the 2006 Formula One World Championship.

Years of exposure to loud engines and age-related hearing problems had left Walker with hearing loss in both ears. In 2006, he became chief ambassador for David Ormerod Hearing Centres, a high-street audiology chain that fitted his hearing aids.

In March 2006, the Honda Racing F1 Team, formerly British American Racing, announced that Walker would become its team ambassador for half of the 2006 season's 18 Grands Prix, starting with the San Marino Grand Prix in April. Walker welcomed Honda Racing's VIP guests and entertained them with his F1 commentary. He was Sky Sports' commentator for their coverage of Grand Prix Masters, performed commentary duties of the Australian Grand Prix for the Australian television broadcaster Network Ten in 2006 and 2007, and voiced the Clipsal 500 V8 Supercars race in Adelaide.

In June 2007, Walker visited the Isle of Man to celebrate the Centenary of the Isle of Man TT, and work on a DVD documentary about the event, TT: Centenary Celebration with Murray Walker. In July 2007, Walker commentated on the European Grand Prix for BBC Radio 5 Live. This was a one-off in lieu of regular commentator David Croft who was on paternity leave. He commented on the qualifying session, the race and presented the phone-in programme 606 to answer listeners' questions.

Walker and writer Philip Porter authored a book called Murray Walker Scrapbook on his memories and photographic memorabilia concerning his career with contributions from members of the Formula One community, which was published on 2 May 2008. On 28 June 2008, Walker was honoured by the people of his hometown and presented with a "Star" on the Walk of Stars on Broad Street, Birmingham.

Walker became a freelance website columnist for the BBC's recovered coverage of Formula One in 2009. He voiced the part of his own character in two episodes of the Five children's television programme Roary the Racing Car in late 2009. Walker made a further appearance on the programme as a professional skateboarder the following year. In early 2011, he lent his voice as a racing commentator to the touring theatre production of Roary the Racing Car entitled Champion of Champions in an animated portion of the programme. A television documentary called Life in the Fast Lane centred on Walker's life and advertising and commentary career was broadcast on BBC Two on 5 June 2011.

In May 2013, while on holiday, Walker had a fall, breaking his pelvis. During treatment for the fall, Walker was diagnosed with the early stages of lymphatic system cancer. His condition was mild and treatable. In June 2013, it was reported that Walker was to receive chemotherapy in the coming months, and had cancelled plans to attend the 2013 British Grand Prix at Silverstone. Walker did not need chemotherapy anymore by July 2013. He was the guest star on BBC Radio 4's Desert Island Discs on 16 March 2014, where he selected Chris McNab's How to Survive Anything, Anywhere: A Handbook of Survival Skills for Every Scenario and Environment as his choice of book, and a hammock and pillow as his luxury items.

In 2015, it was announced Walker would present a new Formula One programme for BBC Two with Suzi Perry. The show called Formula 1 Rewind involved Walker looking back at some of the BBC's archives. In November 2015 he appeared on BBC's game show Pointless, paired with Nigel Mansell.

In 2016, Walker moved with many other BBC F1 staff to Channel 4 to present a series of interviews with the sport's key players. Walker also provided continuity announcements to Formula One programming and races. Walker withdrew from Channel 4's commentary for the 2018 British Grand Prix due to ill health but appeared in recorded features.

== Commentary style ==
Walker chose to stand while commentating during races rather than sitting down, allowing him to speak louder due to his lungs being inflated and his shoulders pushed back. He was uncritical of drivers who had made errors, preferring to let that judgement pass to his co-commentators. Walker was articulate in his speech, and he was a good reader of mood after an on-track incident. He sometimes made humorous verbal errors known as "Murrayisms" that ranged from "simple misidentifications" to "lovely, labyrinthian, effortlessly complex acrobatic displays of linguistic virtuosity." According to Stephen Moss of The Guardian, they were "the hallmark of his commentary over the years" and noted that they made him "the fan who happened to have been given the keys to the commentary box: he couldn't control his enthusiasm and that seemed naturally to lead to catastrophe." Moss likened Walker's commentary voice to a "screech and resembles a 500cc engine being revved up" because he required "a harsh, aggressive, noisy, fast-moving voice" to comment on a constantly changing landscape.

Walker prepared himself for every piece of commentary work by meticulously researching facts and statistics on every driver and race track, updating and rewriting them for the following event. George Tamayo described Walker as having an "encyclopedic" knowledge of Grand Prix racing, and one who held enough authority amongst the press that members of the Formula One community would rarely decline to be interviewed by him. Before the introduction of reliable satellite broadcast equipment, he was obliged by his superiors at the BBC to prepare for television broadcasts by venturing to a circuit two days before a race to prepare for a broadcast in London, where he would watch the day's events on a satellite feed and then commentate on it during the evening highlights programme. Walker was voted "the greatest sports commentator of all time" in a poll conducted by British sports fans in late 2009.

== Personal life ==
Despite his love of cars, Walker never took a driving test. He was given a tank driving licence in the British Army and that was considered valid to qualify for a civilian driving licence. He married his wife Elizabeth, a secretary, at Edmonton Registry Office on 22 January 1960; the couple had no children.

In December 1992, Walker had surgery but twisted his hip the day after surgery.

In June 2013, aged 89, Walker was diagnosed with lymphoma and received chemotherapy. Walker died of fraility of old age at Allenbrook Nursing Home, Fordingbridge, on 13 March 2021, aged 97. He was memorialised by the Williams team at the 2021 Bahrain Grand Prix, where a sticker on the car's halo featured a quote from Walker's commentary, "And I've got to stop, because I've got a lump in my throat", on the 1996 Japanese Grand Prix, when Damon Hill secured the Drivers' Championship. Walker did not have a funeral or memorial service, as per the instructions he made in his will.

== Legacy ==
The Murray Walker Award was established by Motorsport UK in 2023 and is awarded in recognition of "outstanding excellence in broadcast journalism."

== Bibliography ==
=== Autobiography ===
- Unless I'm Very Much Mistaken (Collins Willow, 2002) ISBN 9780007126965
- Murray Walker Scrapbook (with Philip Porter, Porter Press International, 2008) ISBN 9780955656453
- Murray Walker's Formula One Heroes (with Simon Taylor, Virgin Books, 2000) ISBN 9781852279455
- Bedside Wheels (Willow Books, 1986) ISBN 0002182270

=== References ===
- Murray Walker's Grand Prix Year 1987 (First Formula Publishing, 1987) ISBN 9781870066044
- Murray Walker's Grand Prix Year 1988 (First Formula Publishing, 1988) ISBN 9781870066099
- Murray Walker's Grand Prix Year 1989 (First Formula Publishing, 1989) ISBN 9781870066228
- Murray Walker's 1990 Grand Prix Year (Hazleton Publishing Ltd, 1990) ISBN 9780905138824
- Murray Walker's 1991 Grand Prix Year (Hazleton Publishing Ltd, 1991) ISBN 9780905138909
- Murray Walker's 1992 Grand Prix Year (Hazleton Publishing Ltd, 1992) ISBN 9780905138992
- Murray Walker's 1993 Grand Prix Year (Hazleton Publishing Ltd, 1993) ISBN 9781874557302
- Murray Walker's 1994 Grand Prix Year (Hazleton Publishing Ltd, 1994) ISBN 9781874557012
- Murray Walker's 1995 Grand Prix Year (Hazleton Publishing Ltd, 1995) ISBN 9781874557562
- Murray Walker's 1996 Grand Prix Year (Hazleton Publishing Ltd, 1996) ISBN 9781874557173

== See also ==
- Colemanballs
