= 2019 PDC World Youth Championship =

2019 PDC Unicorn World Youth Championship

Tournament information
- Dates: 4 November 2019; 24 November 2019 (final)
- Venue: Butlin's Minehead
- Location: Minehead
- Country: England
- Organisation(s): PDC
- Format: Legs; First to 5 (group stage); First to 6 (knockout phase)
- Prize fund: £60,000
- Winner's share: £10,000

Champion(s)
- (England) Luke Humphries

The 2019 PDC Unicorn World Youth Championship was the ninth edition of the PDC World Youth Championship, a tournament organised by the Professional Darts Corporation for darts players aged between 16 and 23.

The group stage and knock-out phase from the last 32 to the semi-finals were played at Robin Park Centre, Wigan, on 4 November 2019. The final took place on 24 November 2019 at Butlin's Minehead, before the final of the 2019 Players Championship Finals.

Belgium's Dimitri Van den Bergh was the two-time defending champion after defeating Martin Schindler of Germany 6–3 in the 2018 final, but he was unable to defend his title, as he was over the age limit.

Luke Humphries won the tournament for the first time with a 6–0 win over Adam Gawlas in the final.

== Prize money ==
| Position (no. of players) | | Prize money (Total: £60,000) |
|---|---|---|
| Winner | (1) | £10,000 |
| Runner-up | (1) | £5,000 |
| Semi-finalists | (2) | £2,500 |
| Quarter-finalists | (4) | £1,600 |
| Last 16 | (8) | £1,000 |
| Last 32 | (16) | £500 |
| Second in group | (32) | £300 |
| Third in group | (32) | £250 |

== Qualifiers ==
72 players from the final 2019 PDC Development Tour Order of Merit were set to qualify, as were 23 international qualifiers and Max Hopp, who was ranked in the top 32 of the main PDC Order of Merit at the start of the year and therefore took the top seeding place. Christian Bunse, Liam Gallagher, Brad Phillips, Martin Schindler and Jurjen van der Velde qualified through the Development Tour Order of Merit as well as through an International Qualifier, while Development Tour #15 Corey Cadby and International Qualifiers Jaime Nunez and Sarthak Patel withdrew prior to the event, meaning the players ranked 73 to 80 qualified as well.

PDC Order of Merit Qualifiers:

1. (Germany) Max Hopp

Development Tour Qualifiers:

2. (England) Ted Evetts
3. (England) Luke Humphries
4. (Netherlands) Geert Nentjes
5. (England) Ryan Meikle
6. (Republic of Ireland) Ciaran Teehan
7. (Republic of Ireland) Shane McGuirk
8. (Northern Ireland) Nathan Rafferty
9. (England) Callan Rydz
10. (Republic of Ireland) Keane Barry
11. (Netherlands) Jeffrey de Zwaan
12. (Scotland) Greg Ritchie
13. (England) Bradley Brooks
14. (Scotland) Andrew Davidson
15. (Scotland) William Borland
16. (England) Harry Ward
17. (Netherlands) Kevin Doets
18. (Netherlands) Owen Roelofs
19. (Netherlands) Danny van Trijp
20. (Wales) Justin Smith
21. (England) Ben Cheeseman
22. (Scotland) Nathan Girvan
23. (England) Lewis Pride
24. (England) Jarred Cole
25. (Belgium) Mike De Decker
26. (Netherlands) Mike van Duivenbode
27. (Netherlands) Wessel Nijman
28. (Austria) Rusty-Jake Rodriguez
29. (Netherlands) Justin van Tergouw
30. (Netherlands) Berry van Peer
31. (Germany) Christian Bunse
32. (Wales) Rhys Griffin
33. (England) George Killington
34. (England) Aiden Cope
35. (England) Jack Main
36. (Netherlands) Niels Zonneveld
37. (England) Joe Davis
38. (England) Thomas Lovely
39. (England) Keelan Kay
40. (England) Tom Lonsdale
41. (Republic of Ireland) Dylan Powell
42. (England) Owen Maiden
43. (Czech Republic) Adam Gawlas
44. (Czech Republic) Roman Benecký
45. (England) Dan Read
46. (England) Carl Batchelor
47. (Wales) Hywel Manuel
48. (England) Callum Matthews
49. (England) Dom Taylor
50. (England) Jacob Gwynne
51. (England) Danny Key
52. (Netherlands) Jurjen van der Velde
53. (Wales) Benjamin Smith
54. (Netherlands) Marvin van Velzen
55. (England) Bradley Clark
56. (England) Tommy Lishman
57. (England) Connor Arberry
58. (Germany) Martin Schindler
59. (England) James Beeton
60. (Belgium) Seppe Giebens
61. (England) Andy Kent
62. (Wales) Matthew Holbrook
63. (Netherlands) Patrick van den Boogaard
64. (England) Kieran Brignell
65. (England) Alex Jacques
66. (Republic of Ireland) Liam Gallagher
67. (Republic of Ireland) Stephen Rosney
68. (Netherlands) Henk Snijder
69. (England) Brad Phillips
70. (England) John Brown
71. (England) Joshua Burksfield
72. (England) Charlie Symons
73. (Netherlands) Wesley van Trijp
74. (England) Lennon Cradock
75. (England) Adam Paxton
76. (England) Bradley Coltman
77. (England) Connor Scutt
78. (England) Conor Mayes
79. (England) Connor Pickett
80. (England) Jim Moston

International qualifiers:

- (Russia) Maxim Aldoshin
- (Netherlands) Gauke van der Boon
- (Australia) Tremaine Gallagher
- (Japan) Tomoya Goto
- (Republic of Ireland) Kieran Guina
- (Netherlands) Jamai van den Herik
- (Gibraltar) Justin Hewitt
- (Hungary) Patrik Kovács
- (Denmark) Axel Ljungquist
- (Sweden) Hampus Norrström
- (New Zealand) Erik Pu
- (Australia) Jamie Rundle
- (Canada) Evan Suderman
- (Philippines) Dolreich Tongcopanon
- (United States) Jacob Womack
- (China) Zong Xiao Chen

== Draw ==
=== Group stage ===
==== Group 1 ====
| Pos. | Player | P | W | L | LF | LA | +/− | Pts | Status |
|---|---|---|---|---|---|---|---|---|---|
| 1 | (Germany) Max Hopp (1) | 2 | 2 | 0 | 10 | 3 | 7 | 4 | Q |
| 2 | (England) Joe Davis | 2 | 1 | 1 | 6 | 5 | 1 | 2 | Eliminated |
| 3 | (Netherlands) Jurjen van der Velde | 2 | 0 | 2 | 1 | 10 | -9 | 0 | Eliminated |

| Joe Davis (England) | 5-0 | (Netherlands) Jurjen van der Velde |
| Max Hopp (Germany) | 5-2 | (Netherlands) Jurjen van der Velde |
| Max Hopp (Germany) | 5-1 | (England) Joe Davis |

==== Group 2 ====
| Pos. | Player | P | W | L | LF | LA | +/− | Pts | Status |
|---|---|---|---|---|---|---|---|---|---|
| 1 | (Czech Republic) Adam Gawlas | 2 | 2 | 0 | 10 | 6 | 4 | 4 | Q |
| 2 | (England) Dan Read | 2 | 1 | 1 | 7 | 8 | -1 | 2 | |
| 3 | (Wales) Rhys Griffin (32) | 2 | 0 | 2 | 7 | 10 | -3 | 0 | |

| Dan Read (England) | 2-5 | (Czech Republic) Adam Gawlas |
| Rhys Griffin (Wales) | 4-5 | (Czech Republic) Adam Gawlas |
| Rhys Griffin (Wales) | 3-5 | (England) Dan Read |

==== Group 3 ====
| Pos. | Player | P | W | L | LF | LA | +/− | Pts | Status |
|---|---|---|---|---|---|---|---|---|---|
| 1 | (England) Harry Ward (16) | 2 | 2 | 0 | 10 | 4 | 6 | 4 | Q |
| 2 | (England) Jacob Gwynne | 2 | 1 | 1 | 7 | 7 | 0 | 2 | Eliminated |
| 3 | (England) Alex Jacques | 2 | 0 | 2 | 4 | 10 | -6 | 0 | Eliminated |

| Jacob Gwynne (England) | 5-2 | (England) Alex Jacques |
| Harry Ward (England) | 5-2 | (England) Alex Jacques |
| Harry Ward (England) | 5-2 | (England) Jacob Gwynne |

==== Group 4 ====
| Pos. | Player | P | W | L | LF | LA | +/− | Pts | Status |
|---|---|---|---|---|---|---|---|---|---|
| 1 | (England) Andy Kent | 2 | 1 | 1 | 7 | 5 | 2 | 2 | Q |
| 2 | (Netherlands) Kevin Doets (17) | 2 | 1 | 1 | 7 | 7 | 0 | 2 | Eliminated |
| 3 | (England) Bradley Clark | 2 | 1 | 1 | 5 | 7 | -2 | 2 | Eliminated |

| Andy Kent (England) | 5-0 | (England) Bradley Clark |
| Kevin Doets (Netherlands) | 2-5 | (England) Bradley Clark |
| Kevin Doets (Netherlands) | 5-2 | (England) Andy Kent |

==== Group 5 ====
| Pos. | Player | P | W | L | LF | LA | +/− | Pts | Status |
|---|---|---|---|---|---|---|---|---|---|
| 1 | (Northern Ireland) Nathan Rafferty (8) | 2 | 2 | 0 | 10 | 4 | 6 | 4 | Q |
| 2 | (Czech Republic) Roman Benecký | 2 | 1 | 1 | 8 | 9 | -1 | 2 | Eliminated |
| 3 | (Belgium) Seppe Giebens | 2 | 0 | 2 | 5 | 10 | -5 | 0 | Eliminated |

| Roman Benecký (Czech Republic) | 5-4 | (Belgium) Seppe Giebens |
| Nathan Rafferty (Northern Ireland) | 5-1 | (Belgium) Seppe Giebens |
| Nathan Rafferty (Northern Ireland) | 5-3 | (Czech Republic) Roman Benecký |

==== Group 6 ====
| Pos. | Player | P | W | L | LF | LA | +/− | Pts | Status |
|---|---|---|---|---|---|---|---|---|---|
| 1 | (Belgium) Mike De Decker (25) | 2 | 2 | 0 | 10 | 3 | 7 | 4 | Q |
| 2 | (England) Thomas Lovely | 2 | 1 | 1 | 6 | 6 | 0 | 2 | Eliminated |
| 3 | (Wales) Benjamin Smith | 2 | 0 | 2 | 3 | 10 | -7 | 0 | Eliminated |

| Benjamin Smith (Wales) | 1-5 | (England) Thomas Lovely |
| Mike De Decker (Belgium) | 5-1 | (England) Thomas Lovely |
| Mike De Decker (Belgium) | 5-3 | (Wales) Benjamin Smith |

==== Group 7 ====
| Pos. | Player | P | W | L | LF | LA | +/− | Pts | Status |
|---|---|---|---|---|---|---|---|---|---|
| 1 | (England) Callan Rydz (9) | 2 | 2 | 0 | 10 | 5 | 5 | 4 | Q |
| 2 | (England) Jack Main | 2 | 1 | 1 | 9 | 6 | 3 | 2 | Eliminated |
| 3 | (England) Tom Lonsdale | 2 | 0 | 2 | 2 | 10 | -8 | 0 | Eliminated |

| Jack Main (England) | 5-1 | (England) Tom Lonsdale |
| Callan Rydz (England) | 5-1 | (England) Tom Lonsdale |
| Callan Rydz (England) | 5-4 | (England) Jack Main |

==== Group 8 ====
| Pos. | Player | P | W | L | LF | LA | +/− | Pts | Status |
|---|---|---|---|---|---|---|---|---|---|
| 1 | (England) Jarred Cole (24) | 2 | 2 | 0 | 10 | 6 | 4 | 4 | Q |
| 2 | (Japan) Tomoya Gano | 2 | 1 | 1 | 9 | 5 | 4 | 2 | Eliminated |
| 3 | (Australia) Tremaine Gallagher | 2 | 0 | 2 | 2 | 10 | -8 | 0 | Eliminated |

| Tremaine Gallagher (Australia) | 0-5 | (Japan) Tomoya Goto |
| Jarred Cole (England) | 5-4 | (Japan) Tomoya Goto |
| Jarred Cole (England) | 5-2 | (Australia) Tremaine Gallagher |

==== Group 9 ====
| Pos. | Player | P | W | L | LF | LA | +/− | Pts | Status |
|---|---|---|---|---|---|---|---|---|---|
| 1 | (England) Ryan Meikle (5) | 2 | 2 | 0 | 10 | 3 | 7 | 4 | Q |
| 2 | (England) Callum Matthews | 2 | 1 | 1 | 6 | 9 | 3 | 2 | Eliminated |
| 3 | (Australia) Jamie Rundle | 0 | 0 | 2 | 6 | 10 | -4 | 0 | Eliminated |

| Jamie Rundle (Australia) | 4-5 | (England) Callum Matthews |
| Ryan Meikle (England) | 5-1 | (England) Callum Matthews |
| Ryan Meikle (England) | 5-2 | (Australia) Jamie Rundle |

==== Group 10 ====
| Pos. | Player | P | W | L | LF | LA | +/− | Pts | Status |
|---|---|---|---|---|---|---|---|---|---|
| 1 | (Austria) Rusty-Jake Rodriguez (28) | 2 | 2 | 0 | 10 | 3 | 7 | 4 | Q |
| 2 | (Netherlands) Jamai van den Herik | 2 | 1 | 1 | 7 | 7 | 0 | 2 | Eliminated |
| 3 | (England) Conor Mayers | 2 | 0 | 2 | 3 | 10 | -7 | 0 | Eliminated |

| Conor Mayes (England) | 2-5 | (Netherlands) Jamai van den Herik |
| Rusty-Jake Rodriguez (Austria) | 5-2 | (Netherlands) Jamai van den Herik |
| Rusty-Jake Rodriguez (Austria) | 5-1 | (England) Conor Mayes |

==== Group 11 ====
| Pos. | Player | P | W | L | LF | LA | +/− | Pts | Status |
|---|---|---|---|---|---|---|---|---|---|
| 1 | (Scotland) Greg Ritchie (12) | 2 | 1 | 1 | 7 | 6 | 1 | 2 | Q |
| 2 | (England) John Brown | 2 | 1 | 1 | 7 | 7 | 0 | 2 | Eliminated |
| 3 | (Republic of Ireland) Stephen Rosney | 2 | 1 | 1 | 6 | 7 | -1 | 2 | Eliminated |

| John Brown (England) | 2-5 | (Republic of Ireland) Stephen Rosney |
| Greg Ritchie (Scotland) | 5-1 | (Republic of Ireland) Stephen Rosney |
| Greg Ritchie (Scotland) | 2-5 | (England) John Brown |

==== Group 12 ====
| Pos. | Player | P | W | L | LF | LA | +/− | Pts | Status |
|---|---|---|---|---|---|---|---|---|---|
| 1 | (England) Ben Cheeseman (21) | 2 | 2 | 0 | 10 | 7 | 3 | 4 | Q |
| 2 | (England) Connor Scutt | 2 | 1 | 1 | 8 | 5 | 3 | 2 | Eliminated |
| 3 | (England) Dom Taylor | 2 | 0 | 2 | 4 | 10 | -6 | 0 | Eliminated |

| Dom Taylor (England) | 0-5 | (England) Connor Scutt |
| Ben Cheeseman (England) | 5-3 | (England) Connor Scutt |
| Ben Cheeseman (England) | 5-4 | (England) Dom Taylor |

==== Group 13 ====
| Pos. | Player | P | W | L | LF | LA | +/− | Pts | Status |
|---|---|---|---|---|---|---|---|---|---|
| 1 | (Netherlands) Geert Nentjes (4) | 2 | 2 | 0 | 10 | 2 | 8 | 4 | Q |
| 2 | (Russia) Maxim Aldoshin | 2 | 1 | 1 | 7 | 8 | -1 | 2 | Eliminated |
| 3 | (Canada) Evan Suderman | 2 | 0 | 2 | 3 | 10 | -7 | 0 | Eliminated |

| Maxim Aldoshin (Russia) | 5-3 | (Canada) Evan Suderman |
| Geert Nentjes (Netherlands) | 5-0 | (Canada) Evan Suderman |
| Geert Nentjes (Netherlands) | 5-2 | (Russia) Maxim Aldoshin |

==== Group 14 ====
| Pos. | Player | P | W | L | LF | LA | +/− | Pts | Status |
|---|---|---|---|---|---|---|---|---|---|
| 1 | (Netherlands) Justin van Tergouw (29) | 2 | 2 | 0 | 10 | 3 | 7 | 4 | Q |
| 2 | (England) Charlie Symons | 2 | 1 | 1 | 6 | 6 | 0 | 2 | Eliminated |
| 3 | (England) Connor Pickett | 2 | 0 | 2 | 3 | 10 | -7 | 0 | Eliminated |

| Charlie Symons (England) | 5-1 | (England) Connor Pickett |
| Justin van Tergouw (Netherlands) | 5-2 | (England) Connor Pickett |
| Justin van Tergouw (Netherlands) | 5-1 | (England) Charlie Symons |

==== Group 15 ====
| Pos. | Player | P | W | L | LF | LA | +/− | Pts | Status |
|---|---|---|---|---|---|---|---|---|---|
| 1 | (Germany) Martin Schindler | 2 | 2 | 0 | 10 | 2 | 8 | 4 | Q |
| 2 | (England) Bradley Brooks (13) | 2 | 1 | 1 | 7 | 6 | 1 | 2 | Eliminated |
| 3 | (New Zealand) Erik Pu | 2 | 0 | 2 | 1 | 10 | -9 | 0 | Eliminated |

| Martin Schindler (Germany) | 5-0 | (New Zealand) Erik Pu |
| Bradley Brooks (England) | 5-1 | (New Zealand) Erik Pu |
| Bradley Brooks (England) | 2-5 | (Germany) Martin Schindler |

==== Group 16 ====
| Pos. | Player | P | W | L | LF | LA | +/− | Pts | Status |
|---|---|---|---|---|---|---|---|---|---|
| 1 | (Wales) Jim Moston | 2 | 2 | 0 | 10 | 4 | 6 | 4 | Q |
| 2 | (England) Justin Smith (20) | 2 | 1 | 1 | 9 | 6 | 3 | 2 | Eliminated |
| 3 | (Netherlands) Marvin van Velzen | 2 | 0 | 2 | 1 | 10 | -9 | 0 | Eliminated |

| Jim Moston (England) | 5-0 | (Netherlands) Marvin van Velzen |
| Justin Smith (Wales) | 5-1 | (Netherlands) Marvin van Velzen |
| Justin Smith (Wales) | 4-5 | (England) Jim Moston |

==== Group 17 ====
| Pos. | Player | P | W | L | LF | LA | +/− | Pts | Status |
|---|---|---|---|---|---|---|---|---|---|
| 1 | (England) Ted Evetts (2) | 2 | 2 | 0 | 10 | 2 | 8 | 4 | Q |
| 2 | (Republic of Ireland) Kieran Guina | 2 | 1 | 1 | 6 | 7 | -1 | 2 | Eliminated |
| 3 | (Wales) Hywel Manuel | 2 | 0 | 2 | 3 | 10 | -7 | 0 | Eliminated |

| Hywel Manuel (Wales) | 2-5 | (Republic of Ireland) Kieran Guina |
| Ted Evetts (England) | 5-1 | (Republic of Ireland) Kieran Guina |
| Ted Evetts (England) | 5-1 | (Wales) Hywel Manuel |

==== Group 18 ====
| Pos. | Player | P | W | L | LF | LA | +/− | Pts | Status |
|---|---|---|---|---|---|---|---|---|---|
| 1 | (Germany) Christian Bunse (31) | 2 | 2 | 0 | 10 | 2 | 8 | 4 | Q |
| 2 | (England) Owen Maiden | 2 | 1 | 1 | 6 | 8 | -2 | 2 | Eliminated |
| 3 | (England) Tommy Lishman | 2 | 0 | 2 | 4 | 10 | -6 | 0 | Eliminated |

| Owen Maiden (England) | 5-3 | (England) Tommy Lishman |
| Christian Bunse (Germany) | 5-1 | (England) Tommy Lishman |
| Christian Bunse (Germany) | 5-1 | (England) Owen Maiden |

==== Group 19 ====
| Pos. | Player | P | W | L | LF | LA | +/− | Pts | Status |
|---|---|---|---|---|---|---|---|---|---|
| 1 | (Scotland) William Borland (15) | 2 | 2 | 0 | 10 | 4 | 6 | 4 | Q |
| 2 | (England) George Killington | 2 | 1 | 1 | 8 | 6 | 2 | 2 | Eliminated |
| 3 | (Netherlands) Patrick van den Boogaard | 2 | 0 | 2 | 2 | 10 | -8 | 0 | Eliminated |

| George Killington (England) | 5-1 | (Netherlands) Patrick van den Boogaard |
| William Borland (Scotland) | 5-1 | (Netherlands) Patrick van den Boogaard |
| William Borland (Scotland) | 5-3 | (England) George Killington |

==== Group 20 ====
| Pos. | Player | P | W | L | LF | LA | +/− | Pts | Status |
|---|---|---|---|---|---|---|---|---|---|
| 1 | (England) Connor Arberry | 2 | 2 | 0 | 10 | 3 | 7 | 4 | Q |
| 2 | (Netherlands) Owen Roelofs (18) | 2 | 1 | 1 | 7 | 6 | 1 | 2 | Eliminated |
| 3 | (England) Lennon Cradock | 2 | 0 | 2 | 2 | 10 | -8 | 0 | Eliminated |

| Connor Arberry (England) | 5-1 | (England) Lennon Cradock |
| Owen Roelofs (Netherlands) | 5-1 | (England) Lennon Cradock |
| Owen Roelofs (Netherlands) | 2-5 | (England) Connor Arberry |

==== Group 21 ====
| Pos. | Player | P | W | L | LF | LA | +/− | Pts | Status |
|---|---|---|---|---|---|---|---|---|---|
| 1 | (England) James Beeton | 2 | 2 | 0 | 10 | 7 | 3 | 4 | Q |
| 2 | (Republic of Ireland) Shane McGuirk (7) | 2 | 1 | 1 | 9 | 6 | 3 | 2 | Eliminated |
| 3 | (England) Brad Phillips | 2 | 0 | 2 | 4 | 10 | -6 | 0 | Eliminated |

| Brad Phillips (England) | 3-5 | (England) James Beeton |
| Shane McGuirk (Republic of Ireland) | 4-5 | (England) James Beeton |
| Shane McGuirk (Republic of Ireland) | 5-1 | (England) Brad Phillips |

==== Group 22 ====
| Pos. | Player | P | W | L | LF | LA | +/− | Pts | Status |
|---|---|---|---|---|---|---|---|---|---|
| 1 | (Netherlands) Mike van Duivenbode (26) | 2 | 2 | 0 | 10 | 1 | 9 | 4 | Q |
| 2 | (Wales) Matthew Holbrook | 2 | 1 | 1 | 5 | 5 | 0 | 2 | Eliminated |
| 3 | (Netherlands) Gauke van der Boon | 2 | 0 | 2 | 1 | 10 | -9 | 0 | Eliminated |

| Matthew Holbrook (Wales) | 5-0 | (Netherlands) Gauke van der Boon |
| Mike van Duivenbode (Netherlands) | 5-1 | (Netherlands) Gauke van der Boon |
| Mike van Duivenbode (Netherlands) | 5-0 | (Wales) Matthew Holbrook |

==== Group 23 ====
| Pos. | Player | P | W | L | LF | LA | +/− | Pts | Status |
|---|---|---|---|---|---|---|---|---|---|
| 1 | (Republic of Ireland) Keane Barry (10) | 2 | 2 | 0 | 10 | 4 | 6 | 4 | Q |
| 2 | (England) Aiden Cope | 2 | 1 | 1 | 7 | 6 | 1 | 2 | Eliminated |
| 3 | (Hungary) Patrik Kovács | 2 | 0 | 2 | 3 | 10 | -7 | 0 | Eliminated |

| Patrik Kovács (Hungary) | 1-5 | (England) Aiden Cope |
| Keane Barry (Republic of Ireland) | 5-2 | (England) Aiden Cope |
| Keane Barry (Republic of Ireland) | 5-2 | (Hungary) Patrik Kovács |

==== Group 24 ====
| Pos. | Player | P | W | L | LF | LA | +/− | Pts | Status |
|---|---|---|---|---|---|---|---|---|---|
| 1 | (Netherlands) Wesley van Trijp | 2 | 2 | 0 | 10 | 3 | 7 | 4 | Q |
| 2 | (England) Lewis Pride (23) | 2 | 1 | 1 | 7 | 5 | 2 | 2 | Eliminated |
| 3 | (Denmark) Axel Ljungquist | 2 | 0 | 2 | 1 | 10 | -9 | 0 | Eliminated |

| Wesley van Trijp (Netherlands) | 5-1 | (Denmark) Axel Ljungquist |
| Lewis Pride (England) | 5-0 | (Denmark) Axel Ljungquist |
| Lewis Pride (England) | 2-5 | (Netherlands) Wesley van Trijp |

==== Group 25 ====
| Pos. | Player | P | W | L | LF | LA | +/− | Pts | Status |
|---|---|---|---|---|---|---|---|---|---|
| 1 | (Netherlands) Henk Snijder | 2 | 1 | 1 | 9 | 6 | 3 | 2 | Q |
| 2 | (United States) Jacob Womack | 2 | 1 | 1 | 8 | 9 | -1 | 2 | Eliminated |
| 3 | (Republic of Ireland) Ciaran Teehan (6) | 2 | 1 | 1 | 6 | 8 | -2 | 2 | Eliminated |

| Jacob Womack (United States) | 5-4 | (Netherlands) Henk Snijder |
| Ciaran Teehan (Republic of Ireland) | 1-5 | (Netherlands) Henk Snijder |
| Ciaran Teehan (Republic of Ireland) | 5-3 | (United States) Jacob Womack |

==== Group 26 ====
| Pos. | Player | P | W | L | LF | LA | +/− | Pts | Status |
|---|---|---|---|---|---|---|---|---|---|
| 1 | (Netherlands) Wessel Nijman (27) | 2 | 2 | 0 | 10 | 3 | 7 | 4 | Q |
| 2 | (England) Kieran Brignell | 2 | 1 | 1 | 8 | 8 | 0 | 2 | Eliminated |
| 3 | (Sweden) Hampus Norrström | 2 | 0 | 2 | 3 | 10 | -7 | 0 | Eliminated |

| Kieran Brignell (England) | 5-3 | (Sweden) Hampus Norrström |
| Wessel Nijman (Netherlands) | 5-0 | (Sweden) Hampus Norrström |
| Wessel Nijman (Netherlands) | 5-3 | (England) Kieran Brignell |

==== Group 27 ====
| Pos. | Player | P | W | L | LF | LA | +/− | Pts | Status |
|---|---|---|---|---|---|---|---|---|---|
| 1 | (Netherlands) Jeffrey de Zwaan (11) | 2 | 2 | 0 | 10 | 2 | 8 | 4 | Q |
| 2 | (Republic of Ireland) Dylan Powell | 2 | 1 | 1 | 6 | 9 | -3 | 2 | Eliminated |
| 3 | (England) Joshua Burksfield | 2 | 0 | 2 | 5 | 10 | -5 | 0 | Eliminated |

| Joshua Burksfield (England) | 4-5 | (Republic of Ireland) Dylan Powell |
| Jeffrey de Zwaan (Netherlands) | 5-1 | (Republic of Ireland) Dylan Powell |
| Jeffrey de Zwaan (Netherlands) | 5-1 | (England) Joshua Burksfield |

==== Group 28 ====
| Pos. | Player | P | W | L | LF | LA | +/− | Pts | Status |
|---|---|---|---|---|---|---|---|---|---|
| 1 | (Scotland) Nathan Girvan (22) | 2 | 2 | 0 | 10 | 6 | 4 | 4 | Q |
| 2 | (Gibraltar) Justin Hewitt | 2 | 1 | 1 | 8 | 9 | -1 | 2 | Eliminated |
| 3 | (England) Adam Paxton | 2 | 0 | 2 | 7 | 10 | -3 | 0 | Eliminated |

| Justin Hewitt (Gibraltar) | 5-4 | (England) Adam Paxton |
| Nathan Girvan (Scotland) | 5-3 | (England) Adam Paxton |
| Nathan Girvan (Scotland) | 5-3 | (Gibraltar) Justin Hewitt |

==== Group 29 ====
| Pos. | Player | P | W | L | LF | LA | +/− | Pts | Status |
|---|---|---|---|---|---|---|---|---|---|
| 1 | (England) Luke Humphries (3) | 2 | 2 | 0 | 10 | 4 | 6 | 4 | Q |
| 2 | (China) Xiaochen Zong | 2 | 1 | 1 | 6 | 8 | -2 | 2 | Eliminated |
| 3 | (England) Keelan Kay | 2 | 0 | 2 | 6 | 10 | -4 | 0 | Eliminated |

| Keelan Kay (England) | 3-5 | (China) Xiaochen Zong |
| Luke Humphries (England) | 5-1 | (China) Xiaochen Zong |
| Luke Humphries (England) | 5-3 | (England) Keelan Kay |

==== Group 30 ====
| Pos. | Player | P | W | L | LF | LA | +/− | Pts | Status |
|---|---|---|---|---|---|---|---|---|---|
| 1 | (Netherlands) Berry van Peer (30) | 2 | 2 | 0 | 10 | 6 | 4 | 4 | Q |
| 2 | (Philippines) Dolreich Tongcopanon Jr. | 2 | 1 | 1 | 8 | 9 | -1 | 2 | Eliminated |
| 3 | (England) Bradley Coltman | 2 | 0 | 2 | 7 | 10 | -3 | 0 | Eliminated |

| Bradley Coltman (England) | 4-5 | (Philippines) Dolreich Tongcopanon Jr. |
| Berry van Peer (Netherlands) | 5-3 | (Philippines) Dolreich Tongcopanon Jr. |
| Berry van Peer (Netherlands) | 5-3 | (England) Bradley Coltman |

==== Group 31 ====
| Pos. | Player | P | W | L | LF | LA | +/− | Pts | Status |
|---|---|---|---|---|---|---|---|---|---|
| 1 | (England) Carl Batchelor | 2 | 2 | 0 | 10 | 3 | 7 | 4 | Q |
| 2 | (Republic of Ireland) Liam Gallagher | 2 | 1 | 1 | 8 | 9 | -1 | 2 | Eliminated |
| 3 | (Scotland) Andrew Davidson (14) | 2 | 0 | 2 | 4 | 10 | -6 | 0 | Eliminated |

| Liam Gallagher (Republic of Ireland) | 3-5 | (England) Carl Batchelor |
| Andrew Davidson (Scotland) | 0-5 | (England) Carl Batchelor |
| Andrew Davidson (Scotland) | 4-5 | (Republic of Ireland) Liam Gallagher |

==== Group 32 ====
| Pos. | Player | P | W | L | LF | LA | +/− | Pts | Status |
|---|---|---|---|---|---|---|---|---|---|
| 1 | (Netherlands) Niels Zonneveld | 2 | 2 | 0 | 10 | 4 | 6 | 4 | Q |
| 2 | (Netherlands) Danny van Trijp (19) | 2 | 1 | 1 | 6 | 5 | 1 | 2 | |
| 3 | (England) Danny Key | 2 | 0 | 2 | 3 | 10 | -7 | 0 | |

| Niels Zonneveld (Netherlands) | 5-3 | (England) Danny Key |
| Danny van Trijp (Netherlands) | 5-0 | (England) Danny Key |
| Danny van Trijp (Netherlands) | 1-5 | (Netherlands) Niels Zonneveld |

=== Knockout Phase ===
Last 32 (best of 11 legs); 4 November
1 | (Germany) Max Hopp 77.63 | 4
(Czech Republic) Adam Gawlas 87.41 | 6
16 | (England) Harry Ward 82.79 | 6
(England) Andy Kent 85.48 | 4
8 | (Northern Ireland) Nathan Rafferty 89.75 | 6
25 | (Belgium) Mike De Decker 91.36 | 5
9 | (England) Callan Rydz 100.60 | 6
24 | (England) Jarred Cole 79.82 | 2
5 | (England) Ryan Meikle 103.71 | 6
28 | (Austria) Rusty-Jake Rodriguez 92.22 | 1
12 | (Scotland) Greg Ritchie 83.56 | 5
21 | (England) Ben Cheeseman 88.63 | 6
4 | (Netherlands) Geert Nentjes 86.45 | 2
29 | (Netherlands) Justin van Tergouw 90.70 | 6
(Germany) Martin Schindler 82.46 | 6
(England) Jim Moston 73.24 | 1
2 | (England) Ted Evetts 90.14 | 6
31 | (Germany) Christian Bunse 86.38 | 3
15 | (Scotland) William Borland 84.22 | 6
(England) Connor Arberry 82.28 | 2
(England) James Beeton 76.94 | 2
26 | (Netherlands) Mike van Duivenbode 83.83 | 6
10 | (Republic of Ireland) Keane Barry 90.05 | 6
(Netherlands) Wesley van Trijp 79.00 | 1
(Netherlands) Henk Snijder 91.05 | 3
27 | (Netherlands) Wessel Nijman 99.47 | 6
11 | (Netherlands) Jeffrey de Zwaan 96.97 | 6
22 | (Scotland) Nathan Girvan 79.30 | 2
3 | (England) Luke Humphries 100.87 | 6
30 | (Netherlands) Berry van Peer 104.50 | 5
(England) Carl Batchelor 85.56 | 2
(Netherlands) Niels Zonneveld 93.10 | 6

Last 16 (best of 11 legs); 4 November
(Czech Republic) Adam Gawlas 96.36 | 6
16 | (England) Harry Ward 94.39 | 2
8 | (Northern Ireland) Nathan Rafferty 94.82 | 5
9 | (England) Callan Rydz 95.10 | 6
5 | (England) Ryan Meikle 93.73 | 6
21 | (England) Ben Cheeseman 89.72 | 3
29 | (Netherlands) Justin van Tergouw 88.92 | 2
(Germany) Martin Schindler 92.92 | 6
2 | (England) Ted Evetts 90.00 | 5
15 | (Scotland) William Borland 88.95 | 6
26 | (Netherlands) Mike van Duivenbode 87.75 | 4
10 | (Republic of Ireland) Keane Barry 94.50 | 6
27 | (Netherlands) Wessel Nijman 92.71 | 5
11 | (Netherlands) Jeffrey de Zwaan 102.68 | 6
3 | (England) Luke Humphries 95.50 | 6
(Netherlands) Niels Zonneveld 86.10 | 3

Quarter-finals (best of 11 legs); 4 November
(Czech Republic) Adam Gawlas 88.11 | 6
9 | (England) Callan Rydz 84.14 | 2
5 | (England) Ryan Meikle 91.57 | 6
(Germany) Martin Schindler 87.90 | 2
15 | (Scotland) William Borland 89.33 | 3
10 | (Republic of Ireland) Keane Barry 90.93 | 6
11 | (Netherlands) Jeffrey de Zwaan 97.74 | 5
3 | (England) Luke Humphries 95.77 | 6

Semi-finals (best of 11 legs); 4 November
(Czech Republic) Adam Gawlas 91.43 | 6
5 | (England) Ryan Meikle 88.58 | 3
10 | (Republic of Ireland) Keane Barry 84.85 | 2
3 | (England) Luke Humphries 94.41 | 6

Final (best of 11 legs); 24 November
(Czech Republic) Adam Gawlas 78.42 | 0
3 | (England) Luke Humphries 92.97 | 6
