= List of Formula One broadcasters =

Formula One, the highest class of open-wheel, single-seater formula race cars sanctioned by the Fédération Internationale de l'Automobile (FIA), can be seen live or tape delayed on television in almost every country and territory around the world. Formula One attracts one of the largest global TV audiences after the FIFA World Cup and the Olympic Games, with a total global audience of about 352 million people for the 2017 season.

This is a list of Formula One broadcasters and 'World Feed' producers.

== History of Formula One on television ==
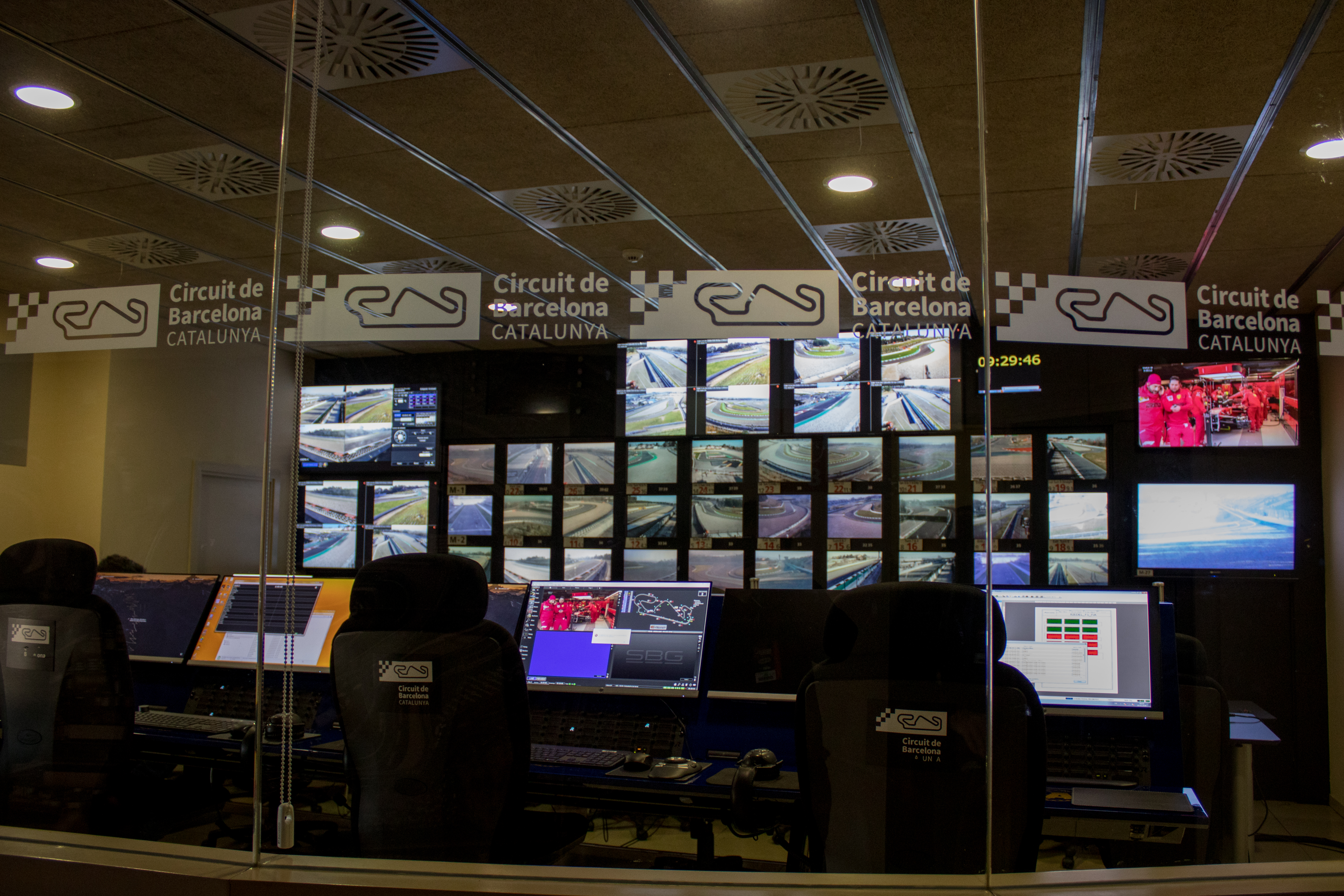
Media centre at the Circuit de Barcelona-Catalunya during 2020 pre-season testing

Television and other media broadcasters all take what is known as the World Feed, the live broadcast of a Formula 1 Grand Prix, which, since the first TV rights were sold in the 1970s, has been produced by a host broadcaster from each nation for their home race. Such examples include TF1 for the French Grand Prix, the BBC for the British Grand Prix, RAI for the Italian Grand Prix, and so on.

Starting with select races in the 2004 Formula One World Championship, the World Feed has been gradually produced by FOM (Formula One Management) television production, the in-house media company of Formula One Group (now owned by Liberty Media), for every round of the F1 World Championship.

=== F1 Digital+ ===
Originally, FOM started producing an enhanced digital version of the World Feed from the 1996 season, when the F1 Digital+ service (also known as Bernie Vision) was launched via satellite on a subscription base. The service offered additional features to the standard, single analogue television feed of the sport, which digital broadcasters had the option of taking up and broadcasting on their own digital interactive television platforms (at a higher price than the standard television feed, which often necessitated the broadcasters charging viewers for), such as channels dedicated to onboard cameras, cameras in the pit area, additional cameras focusing on action involving cars lower down the running order and live timing data.

This led to a two-tier system between 1996 through 2002, which was unique in the sports' industry, where F1 races could be watched simultaneously for free via the World Feed produced by the local broadcaster and on pay-per-view or subscription base via the enhanced digital satellite World Feed produced by FOM for F1 Digital+.

The race coverage shown on regular terrestrial TV was produced by a local broadcaster (the host broadcaster) and provided to all other broadcasters around the world. By comparison, the majority of the coverage shown on the F1 Digital+ service was produced on-site at each Grand Prix venue by Formula One Management. The operation involved transporting around 200 tons of equipment to each race. To transport the equipment required 18 trucks for European rounds or two Boeing 747 jumbo jets for fly-away races. At the race venue, a 1200 sq m air-conditioned tent was set up containing the majority of the equipment. The service was run by Eddie Baker, and the tent was colloquially referred to as Bakersville.

=== Modernising the broadcast ===
When the F1 Digital+ pay-per-view service was shut down by Ecclestone at the end of the 2002 season, due to financial failure, FOM gradually started taking over the production of the World Feed in select races where the local broadcaster could not guarantee a consistent production on international level.

In 2004 new television overlays were introduced which closely reflected those of F1 Digital+, reintroducing elements such as the lap counter, track status indicators and rev counters. Team Radio was broadcast at the 2004 Chinese Grand Prix and was available at every race from the 2006 season onwards.

The biggest innovation of pay per view was a permanent production team at every Grand Prix, establishing consistent quality over the variable nature of host broadcasters. The success of F1 Digital+ in this area resulted in Formula One Management gradually taking control of the World Feed in the subsequent seasons. From the 2007 season Formula One Management directed the TV coverage of all but three races, and for the 2008 season this number was reduced to two: the Monaco Grand Prix, produced by Télé Monte Carlo, and the Japanese Grand Prix, produced by Fuji Television. From 2023 onwards, FOM started producing coverage of the Monaco Grand Prix, thus completing the World Feed production takeover of all F1 races started with select races in 2004.

=== Technical information ===
From a technical standpoint, the World Feed has been produced in 16:9 widescreen since the 2007 Australian Grand Prix. Host Broadcasters trialled widescreen broadcasts for local viewers sporadically prior to the 2007 season – FujiTV and Australia are some of the broadcasters who did.

From 2006, Fuji Television filmed and broadcast the Japanese Grand Prix in high definition for their domestic audience. For the 2011 season, FOM released a high definition feed to broadcasters for the first time, and for 2012, the footage was filmed with 5.1 channel Dolby Digital surround sound audio. From 2017, footage began being broadcast in 4K ultra-high definition.

Alongside the main World Feed, formerly known as Super-Signal Feed during the F1 Digital+ era, FOM also produce a Pit-lane channel, showing shots from the pitlane and alternative camera angles, along with detailed weather and tyre information, and extra team radio. FOM also produce Onboard channels, showing live video from cameras installed on the drivers' cars. The channels switch between different cars throughout the session. FOM also make available a Driver tracker channel, showing live positions of all the cars on the track during a session, as well as a timing screen showing live lap-times and circuit sector information. In addition to the 20 driver onboard streams, viewers will also be able to experience the Battle Channel, a split-screen co-produced by FOM and Sky Sports UK, focusing on a battle between up to three cars. Furthermore, FOM produce a Data Channel, giving live timing and live data relating to pit-stops, tyres status, weather updates, FIA statements and other information about the session, as well as a Highlights Channel, rolling highlights up to the current point in the race.

== Broadcasters ==
Currently, broadcasters offering the enhanced coverage of these FOM-produced extra channels include Sky Sports F1 (UK), Fox Sports (Australia), Sky Sport F1 (Italy), Movistar F1 (Spain), Sky Sport (Germany), Play Sports (Belgium) and Art Sport (Kosovo), thus reaching a total of twelve countries (United Kingdom, Ireland, Belgium, Germany, Austria, Switzerland, Italy, San Marino, Vatican City, Spain, Kosovo Australia). Out of the 9 on board channels, Fox Sports Australia only shows the Master onboard channel to its viewers, whereas Sky Sports F1 makes all the on board channels available. The Pit lane, Driver Tracker and Live Timing channels are available to Sky viewers in the United Kingdom.

In 2018, FOM launched an over-the-top streaming platform known as F1 TV, providing live commercial-free coverage of all races including access to all on-board cameras. The service launched initially in Germany, France, the United States, Mexico, Belgium, Austria, Hungary and parts of Latin America.

=== United Kingdom and Ireland ===
In 2011, Sky Sports signed a seven-year deal with the BBC (who had already had broadcasting rights for several years), to show live Formula One on Sky in the United Kingdom for the first time. The deal which ran between 2012 and 2015 saw Sky Sports show live coverage of every session of the season on their own F1 dedicated channel, Sky Sports F1. Sky Sports F1 show all races and qualifying sessions live. In 2016, Sky extended their contract to 2024, and will be the exclusive live rights holders in the UK and Ireland from 2019; the British Grand Prix and highlights of all other races will be shown free-to-air, on a channel which has "90% technical availability". At the same time it was announced that Sky will broadcast all events in ultra-high-definition (UHD) from 2017. Sky Sports F1 have broadcast every practice, qualifying and race since 2017 in 4K Ultra-HD, exclusively for Sky Q 2TB customers.

The BBC had shown Formula One until 1996, after which the rights moved to ITV. In 2009 they returned to the BBC after ITV decided to exit Formula One. The BBC showed all races live for the next three seasons until the commencement of their deal with Sky which saw the BBC broadcast live coverage of half the races and all 20 races had "extended highlights". They also showed live coverage of practice and qualifying sessions from their live races. The deal set that the British Grand Prix and the final race had to be shown live on the BBC.

For each Grand Prix (even if live) the BBC showed "extended highlights" of the race just a few hours after it had been broadcast. Late afternoon for early hours races and/or early evening. Late evening races were shown on the day and repeated on Monday evening. The BBC Radio 5 Live coverage was unaffected.

Due to financial pressures, the BBC ended their television contract early after the 2015 season, transferring their rights to Channel 4 until the end of the 2018 season. Sky Sports F1 remained unaffected and BBC Radio 5 Live and Sports Extra's coverage was extended until 2021.

Channel 4, like the BBC before them, always shows the British Grand Prix and the final race live. Non-live races have "extended highlights" of the race shown a few hours after it has taken place. Highlights of races held early morning are broadcast mid-afternoon, with afternoon races shown early evening and late evening races shown later in the evening. Their live broadcasts for 2016 until 2018 were Bahrain, Spain, Europe, Britain, Hungary, Belgium, Italy, Malaysia, Mexico and Abu Dhabi. In July 2018, it was understood that Channel 4 were in final negotiations with Sky and Liberty Media to continue with the free-to-air rights. Channel 4 shows sprint qualifying and races; Grand Prix qualifying and races as extended highlights. From 2019 to 2022 Channel 4 airs the British Grand Prix live plus the remaining races as highlights. In 2021, Sky Sports F1 partnered with Channel 4 to broadcast the season-concluding Abu Dhabi Grand Prix live and free-to-air. In 2022, Sky recently extended their contract to 2029, and Channel 4 until 2023. In July 2023, Channel 4 extended their contract to 2026. In May 2026, Sky signed a £1bn deal to secure their Formula 1 rights to 2034.

=== United States ===
Cable television network ESPN aired Formula One races in the United States between 1984 and 1997. From 1998 to 2000, coverage was split between Speedvision (full live coverage) and Fox Sports Net (usually taped delayed). From 2001 to 2012, Speedvision (later renamed Speed) had full coverage of the championship, with select races also airing on broadcast networks (ABC in early years, CBS in 2005, Fox from 2007 to 2012).

On 14 October 2012, NBC Sports signed a four-year deal to broadcast Formula One races in the United States. The majority of its coverage (including most races, and all practice/qualifying sessions) was broadcast by the pay channel NBCSN (with CNBC as an overflow channel), while four races were aired by the free-to-air NBC network per-season. The network also streamed additional camera feeds through its digital platforms.

On 4 October 2017, ESPN announced that it had acquired rights to Formula One under a multi-year deal beginning in 2018. ESPN had previously broadcast Formula One from 1984 to 1997. The majority of coverage will be carried by ESPN2, but two races (Monaco, Britain) will be carried on the main ESPN channel, and three races (Canada, United States and Mexico; it would later air the Miami Grand Prix starting in 2023), as well as an afternoon encore of the Monaco Grand Prix (following its Indianapolis 500 telecast in 2018), will be broadcast free-to-air on ABC. Unlike the previous contract with NBC Sports, Formula One will retain over-the-top rights, ESPN will reportedly not pay a traditional rights fee, and it was originally announced that the broadcasts would rely primarily on the world feed. However, it was later announced that ESPN would utilize Sky Sports' coverage. On 22 October 2022, ESPN recently extended their deal until 2025. Starting in 2023, five races will be aired on ABC, with Monaco to be aired live on the network for the first time.

Apple TV obtained five-year exclusive streaming rights in the United States from 2026 onward. In February 2026, IMAX and Apple announced that the Miami, Monaco, British, Italian and United States Grands Prix would be broadcast live in IMAX theatres in the United States. Apple also announced that as part of a licensing deal with Netflix to bring the eighth season of Drive to Survive to the service in the United States, Netflix would also broadcast the Canadian Grand Prix alongside Apple TV.

=== Australia ===
The Nine Network began airing Formula One races in Australia in 1981, initially with delayed race highlights. This was followed by their first live F1 telecast via satellite of the 1981 Belgian Grand Prix at Zolder.

Nine's coverage continued until 2002. They used the BBC commentary team until 1996, and then the ITV commentary team from 1997 to 2002.

In 2000, and not being happy with the coverage Australian viewers were getting of international races (see Australian Grand Prix from 1985 to 2006 paragraph below), FOM boss Bernie Ecclestone struck a deal with Fox Sports Australia to show the Malaysian GP live and uninterrupted. Viewers were concerned when the Channel 9 intro was shown but were relieved when a different host (Cameron Williams) appeared, Peter McKay was the co-host. Fox Sports showed the usual short highlights of qualifying, followed by the full qualifying results. Then instead of returning to the studio and they went live to the uninterrupted local feed for the pre-race coverage. This was the first time Australian viewers would see the traditional 5 minute FOM FIA Formula One intro with its iconic music. After that, the ITV commentary was connected. The entire race including the cars doing their slow down lap and the action in parc ferme were shown. The podium was shown with ITV comments - unfortunately there was interference with the satellite (due to the weather between Malaysia and Australia) causing artifacts to appear, the host apologized when ITV went to a break. The English press conference was shown in full. This was a one-off however until 2015.

In 2001, Digital TV arrived in Australia, and the Australian Grand Prix was produced and broadcast in native widescreen (16:9) on Channel 9 Digital for 2001 and 2002. For National Viewers watching on Analogue TV, they received a letterbox (14:9 feed in a 4:3 frame) version of the Feed, while international viewers got a standard 4:3 feed. As a result of Digital TV, the fatality of Graham Beveridge in 2001 was captured on the widescreen cameras, which lead to very few replays or analysis being shown.

In 2003, Network 10 started broadcasting the Formula One World Championship after the Nine Network dropped the rights in 2002 after 22 years of coverage. Network 10 used the ITV commentary team and then the BBC team, when they got the rights back. After BBC left F1 in 2015, Channel 10 started using Channel 4's coverage. For 2003 only, the Australian Grand Prix was produced and broadcast nationally in native widescreen (16:9) on Channel 10 Digital (2003). The same set up as Channel 9 was used for Analogue TV and international viewers.

When FOM took over the broadcast in 2004, the local coverage was reverted to 4:3 – from 2004 to 2006, only the Channel Ten studio, pit lane reporters cameras and support races' onboard cameras were in widescreen. This caused digital TV viewers to get a bright red or yellow border to fill the 16:9 blank space when the FOM cameras were being shown.

The Australian Grand Prix from 1985 to 2006 was the only event that had all sessions shown live in Australia. All other races were either shown live or tape delayed depending on other commitments and time zone differences (some events were delayed up to seven hours after the scheduled race start, while others were delayed by thirty minutes. Also, it dependent on where in the country you are watching from, as some states got races live while others had to wait), with only short highlights of qualifying or major incidents during practice shown in the lead up to the race coverage.

During the Channel 9 era, BBC commentary was complemented with Australian motorsport commentary experts at the Australian Grand Prix (1985 - 1995), then used the BBC for 1996 and ITV commentary teams from 1997 to 2002 without any Australian motorsport commentary experts alongside.

During the Channel 10 era, Channel 10 used their own in house commentary to allow the optimisation of ad breaks at the Australian Grand Prix only.

In 2007, all qualifying sessions were shown in full either live or on tape delay.

In 2009, the Australian F1 telecast moved to One SD and HD. When One HD was rebranded, the coverage returned to Channel 10.

On February 13, 2015, Network 10 and Fox Sports signed a five-Year Deal starting in 2015 until 2019, Network 10 broadcast 10 races live including Australian Grand Prix and the remaining races shown Highlights, while Fox Sports broadcast all Practices, Qualifying and Races.

On September 30, 2017, Network 10 dropped its remaining Formula One international live races; it retained the broadcast rights of Formula One Australian Grand Prix live races and rest of the races being highlights, beginning with the Malaysian Grand Prix. Fox Sports live coverage continued unchanged for the next five years, until 2022.

On March 23, 2022, Fox Sports extended their contract to 2026.

In 2023, Network 10 quietly dropped the highlights packages due to poor reception (being shown late night Mondays). They however were committed to broadcasting live coverage of the Australian Grand Prix only until 2026. Also in 2023, Foxtel users were able to get F1 TV Pro for free.

On 3 March 2026, ahead of the season-opening race in Melbourne, Foxtel and Kayo Sports announced their contract extension for the 2027 season and beyond. Network 10 remained as free-to-air partner for Australian Grand Prix.

=== Russia and Belarus ===
In March 2022, following Russia's invasion of Ukraine, Formula 1 management terminated the contract of Match TV, the Russian broadcasting rights holder, and blocked access to F1 TV broadcasts from Russian and Belarusian territories.

=== F1 TV ===
In 2018, Formula 1 launched a subscription service called F1 TV with live streams of every F1 session and support series. The service includes many other features including live telemetry, on-demand views of each car and replays of historic F1 races, as well as exclusive shows. As of 2019, F1 TV restricts viewing to the country of residence or the EU, and requires the user to have a valid credit card in that same country. Due to rights restrictions, if outside the EU, it is not possible to watch F1 TV from outside one's home country. Starting in 2026, as a result of Apple acquiring the Formula 1 broadcasting rights, F1 TV users in the United States are required to obtain an Apple TV Subscription to watch F1 TV's live sessions with the exception of archived footages, exclusive shows, and other live telemetry. While the F1 TV platform is available worldwide, it remains closed in Russia and Belarus due to Russia's invasion of Ukraine.

=== 2026 broadcasters ===
These are the broadcasters for the 2026 Formula One World Championship.

2026 TV broadcasters
Country	TV network	Free-to-air / Free-to-view / Pay	Practice 1	Practice 2	Practice 3	Qualifying	Race	Notes
Albania	SuperSport	Pay	No	No	No	Live	Live	HDTV.
Argentina	Fox Sports	Pay	Live/Delayed	Live/Delayed	Live/Delayed	Live/Delayed	Live/Delayed	Some races live. 16:9 SD/HDTV feed. Can also watch on Disney+. Rights until 2028.
Armenia	Fast Sports	Pay	No	No	No	Live	Live	16:9 SD/HD feed
Australia	Network 10	Free	Live	Live	Live	Live	Live	SD/HD Feed, Australian Grand Prix only. Multi-year deal from 2023 until 2026, extended from 2027 onwards.
Australia	Fox Sports	Pay	Live	Live	Live	Live	Live	Sky Sports F1 coverage. Available in 4K. 'Multi-year' rights deal from 2023 until 2026, extended from 2027 onwards.
Austria	ORF	Free	Live	Live	Live	Live	Live/Delayed	HDTV. 12 races live. Rights until 2026.
Austria	Servus TV	Free	Live	Live	Live	Live	Live/Delayed	HDTV. 12 races live. Rights until 2029.
Austria	Sky Sport F1	Pay	Live	Live	Live	Live	Live	Ultra HD. Rights until 2027.
Azerbaijan	Idman Azerbaijan TV	Free	No	No	No	Live	Live	
Azerbaijan	Setanta Sports	Pay	No	No	No	Live	Live	16:9 SD/HD feed
Belgium	Play Sports	Pay	Live	Live	Live	Live	Live	HDTV. *Some qualifiers on Play6. Rights until 2027.
Belgium	VRT	DVB-C Free in Belgium, DVB-S on Astra 23.5°E (EU)	No	No	No	Live	Live	HDTV. Belgian Grand Prix only. Highlights of other races.
Belgium	Tipik	DVB-C and DVB-T Free in Belgium, DVB-S on Hotbird 13°E (EU)	Live	Live	Live	Live*	Live*	HDTV. Practice sessions for the Belgian Grand Prix are broadcast live. *Some races on La Une. Rights until 2027.
Bosnia and Herzegovina	Arena Sport	Pay	Live	Live	Live	Live	Live	Rights until 2028.
Brazil	TV Globo	Free	No	No	No	No	Live	Up to 15 races live on TV Globo, while all sessions live on SporTV, available in 4K. Rights until 2028.
Brazil	SporTV	Pay	Live	Live	Live	Live	Live	Up to 15 races live on TV Globo, while all sessions live on SporTV, available in 4K. Rights until 2028.
Brunei	beIN Sports	Pay	Live	Live	Live	Live	Live	Sky Sports F1 coverage. Rights until 2030.HDTV 1080i.
Bulgaria	Diema Sport	Pay	Live	Live	Live	Live	Live	16:9 SD/HD/4K feed. Rights until 2027.
Canada	RDS	Pay	No	No	No	Live	Live	HDTV. All practices live for Canadian Grand Prix.
Canada	TSN	Pay	App	Live	App	Live	Live	HDTV, Sky Sports F1 coverage, Side-by-Side coverage during the race (live broadcasts only).
Canada	CTV/Noovo	Free	No	No	No	No	Live	HDTV. Canadian Grand Prix only.
Cambodia	beIN Sports	Pay	Live	Live	Live	Live	Live	Sky Sports F1 coverage. Rights until 2030. HDTV 1080i.
Caribbean	ESPN	Pay	Live	Live	Live	Live	Live	16:9 SD/HDTV feed. Rights until 2028.
Caribbean	Rush Sports	Pay	Live	Live	Live	Live	Live	16:9 SD/HD feed.
Central Asia	Setanta Sports	Pay	No	No	No	Live	Live	16:9 SD/HD feed
China	Great Sports	Free	No	No	No	Live	Live	Broadcast in Shanghai only.
China	Guangdong Sports	Free	No	No	No	Sometimes delayed	Sometimes delayed	Broadcast in Guangdong only.
China	CCTV-5/CCTV-5+	Free	No	No	No	Sometimes delayed	Sometimes delayed	Nationwide broadcasting.
Croatia	RTL/RTL 2	Free	Live	Live	Live	Live	Live	Practice sessions and qualifying are broadcast on RTL 2. Race is broadcast on RTL. Rights until 2028.
Croatia	Voyo	Pay	Live	Live	Live	Live	Live	Practice sessions and qualifying are broadcast on RTL 2. Race is broadcast on RTL. Rights until 2028.
Cyprus	Omega Channel	Free	No	No	No	Live	Live	Rights until 2028.
Czech Republic	Nova Sport	Pay	Live	Live	Live	Live	Live	Multiyear deal from 2024.
Denmark	TV3+	Pay	Live	Live	Live	Live	Live	HD 16:9 – Some sessions on TV3 SPORT 1/2 or TV3 Puls, all other remaining races on Viaplay. Rights until 2029.
East Timor	beIN Sports	Pay	Live	Live	Live	Live	Live	Sky Sports F1 coverage. Rights until 2030. HDTV 1080i.
Estonia	Go3 Sport	Pay	Live	Live	Live	Live	Live	HDTV. Rights until 2024.
Finland	V Sport	Pay	Live	Live	Live	Live	Live	HDTV. Rights until 2029.
France	Canal+	Pay	No	No	No	only once	Live	Race available in UHD. Rights until 2029.
France	Canal+ Sport	Pay	Live	Live	Live	Live	Delayed	FPs and Qualification in HD only
Georgia	Setanta Sports	Pay	No	No	No	Live	Live	16:9 SD/HD feed
Germany	RTL Television	Free	No	No	No	Live	Live	7 Races live: China, Emilia-Romagna, Spain, Canada, Belgium, Dutch GP, and Las Vegas. Saturday Sprints or Qualifyings Live. Rights until 2025.
Germany	Sky Sport F1	Pay	Live	Live	Live	Live	Live	Available in Ultra HD. Exclusive coverage from 2021. Rights until 2027.
Greece	ANT1	DVB-T Free in Greece, DVB-S2 on Eutelsat HotBird 13°B, Eutelsat 9B 9°E and Hellas Sat 3 39°E (EU)	Live	Live	Live	Live	Live	HDTV 1080i. Qualifying and free practice sections are now streaming on ΑΝΤ1+ with Races, including Sprint Races, aired on ΑΝΤ1. Rights until 2028.
Hong Kong	beIN Sports	Pay	Live	Live	Live	Live	Live	Sky Sports F1 coverage. Rights until 2030. HDTV 1080i. Available in Ultra HD (Main Race only).
Hungary	M4 Sport	DVB-T Free in HU, DVB-S2 FTV on Eutelsat 9B 9°E (EU)	Live	Live	Live	Live	Live	HDTV 1080i. Rights until 2027.
Iceland	Viaplay Group	Pay	Live	Live	Live	Live	Live	HDTV. Rights until 2029.
India	FanCode	Pay	Live	Live	Live	Live	Live	Rights until 2028.
Indonesia	beIN Sports	Pay	Live	Live	Live	Live	Live	Sky Sports F1 coverage. Rights until 2030. HDTV 1080i.
Ireland	Channel 4 UK	DVB-T Free in UK, DVB-S FTA on Astra 28.2°E (UK)	Live	Live	Live	Live/Highlights	Live/Highlights	HDTV, Live for British Grand Prix only (including all of the practices), Highlights for all other races.
Ireland	Sky Sports F1	Pay	Live	Live	Live	Live	Live	Available in Ultra HD. Rights until 2034.
Israel	Sport 5	Pay	No	No	No	Live	Live	Ultra HD only for races.
Italy	Sky Sport F1	Pay	Live	Live	Live	Live	Live	Choice of different perspectives. Available in Ultra HD. Rights until 2032.
Italy	TV8	DVB-T FTA in Italy, DVB-S2 FTV on Eutelsat Hot Bird 13°E (EU)	No	No	No	Live/Delayed	Live/Delayed	HDTV. 2 races (Emilia-Romagna & Italy) & All Sprints live.
Japan	Fuji TV	Free	No	No	No	No	Highlights	Race highlights of up to five rounds in 2026.
Japan	Fuji TV Next	Pay	Live	Live	Live	Live	Live	HDTV. Rights until 2030.
Kosovo	Sport	Pay	No	No	No	Live	Live	HDTV. Choice of different perspectives.
Laos	beIN Sports	Pay	Live	Live	Live	Live	Live	Sky Sports F1 coverage. Rights until 2030. HDTV 1080i.
Latin America (except Brazil and Mexico)	ESPN	Pay	Live	Live	Live	Live	Live	16:9 SD/HDTV feed. Exclusive rights until 2028.
Latvia	Go3 Sport	Pay	Live	Live	Live	Live	Live	HDTV. Rights until 2024.
Liechtenstein	SRG SSR	DVB-T Free in Switzerland, DVB-S Encrypted on Eutelsat Hot Bird 13°E (EU)	No	No	No	Live	Live	The qualifyings and the races are broadcast on RSI La 2, RTS Deux and SRF zwei. Rights until 2021.
Liechtenstein	Sky Sport F1	Pay	Live	Live	Live	Live	Live	Available in Ultra HD. Rights until 2027.
Lithuania	Go3 Sport	Pay	Live	Live	Live	Live	Live	HDTV. Rights until 2024.
Luxembourg	RTL	Free	Live	Live	Live	Live	Live	Rights until 2026.
Luxembourg	Sky Sport	Pay	Live	Live	Live	Live	Live	HDTV. Rights until 2027.
Malta	TVMSport+	Free	Live	Live	Live	Live	Live	Rights until 2027.
Malaysia	RTM	Free	Live	Live	Live	Live	Live	Bahrain Grand Prix held in Malaysia only in 2026, live on both Okey and Sukan+.
Malaysia	beIN Sports	Pay	Live	Live	Live	Live	Live	Sky Sports F1 coverage. Rights until 2030. HDTV 1080i.
Mexico	Sky Sports	Pay	Live	Live	Live	Live	Live	16:9 SD/HDTV feed. Exclusive TV rights from remaining of 2025 season until 2028.
Mexico	Canal 5	Free	Live	Live	Live	Live	Live	HDTV. 16:9 feed. Mexican Grand Prix only.
Middle East and North Africa	beIN Sports	Pay	Live	Live	Live	Live	Live	Rights until 2033.
Moldova	Setanta Sports	Pay	No	No	No	Live	Live	16:9 SD/HD feed
Monaco	Canal+	Pay	Live	Live	Live	Live	Live	Rights until 2029.
Montenegro	Arena Sport	Pay	Live	Live	Live	Live	Live	Rights until 2028.
Myanmar	Canal+	Pay	Live	Live	Live	Live	Live	Rights until 2025.
Netherlands	Viaplay	Pay	Live	Live	Live	Live	Live	HDTV. Rights until 2029.
Netherlands	Viaplay TV	Free	Live	Live	Live	Live/Highlights	Live/Highlights	Some races Live, Highlights of other races. HDTV. Rights until 2029.
Netherlands	NOS	Free	No	No	No	Live/Highlights	Live/Highlights	HDTV. Live: Dutch Grand Prix; Highlights of other races.
New Zealand	Sky Sport	Pay	Live	Live	Live	Live	Live	Rights until 2028.
New Zealand	Sky Open	Free	No	No	No	No	Highlights	FTA 1hr highlights package on Monday evening (usually 6pm). Live coverage of Australian Grand Prix.
North Macedonia	Arena Sport	Pay	Live	Live	Live	Live	Live	Rights until 2028.
Norway	V Sport	Pay	Live	Live	Live	Live	Live	Available in Ultra HD. Always Norwegian during race. Partly Swedish during some P and Q. Rights until 2029.
Pacific Islands and Papua New Guinea	Digicel	Pay	Live	Live	Live	Live	Live	
Philippines	beIN Sports	Pay	Live	Live	Live	Live	Live	Sky Sports F1 coverage. Rights until 2030. HDTV 1080i.
Poland	Eleven Sports	Pay	Live	Live	Live	Live	Live	HDTV. Rights until 2028. Available in Ultra HD (Main Race only). 6 races to be broadcast on Super Polsat TV channel (incl. Japan and Emilia Romagna).
Portugal	DAZN	Pay	Live - Free	Live - Free	Live - Free	Live	Live	Practice sessions are free to watch on DAZN's website and DAZN's app. HD feed. Rights until 2030.
Romania	Antena	Free	Live	Live	Live	Live	Live	HDTV. Rights until 2026. Free Practice sessions only on digital platform.
San Marino	Sky Sport F1	Pay	Live	Live	Live	Live	Live	Choice of different perspectives. Available in Ultra HD. Rights until 2032.
Serbia	Arena Sport	Pay	Live	Live	Live	Live	Live	Rights until 2028.
Singapore	beIN Sports	Pay	Live	Live	Live	Live	Live	Sky Sports F1 coverage. Rights until 2030. HDTV 1080i.
Singapore	Mediacorp Channel 5	Free	Live	Delayed	Live	Live	Live	Singapore Grand Prix only. All sessions are also available on MeWATCH.
Slovakia	Nova Sport	Pay	Live	Live	Live	Live	Live	Multiyear deal from 2024.
Slovenia	Kanal A	Pay	No	No	No	Live	Live	Rights until 2028.
Slovenia	Voyo	Pay	Live	Live	Live	Live	Live	Rights until 2028.
South Korea	Coupang Play	Pay	Live	Live	Live	Live	Live	Extended multiyear rights from 2026.
Spain and Andorra	DAZN	Pay	Live	Live	Live	Live	Live	Rights until 2026.
Spain and Andorra	Mediaset	Free	Live	Live	Live	Live	Live	Only Spanish GP and Barcelona-Catalunya Grand Prix.
Sub-Saharan Africa	SuperSport	Pay	Live	Live	Live	Live	Live	HDTV, Sky Sports F1 coverage.
Sub-Saharan Africa	Canal+ Sport	Pay	Live	Live	Live	Live	Live	HDTV
Suriname	ATV	Free	Live	Live	Live	Live	Live	HDTV.
Suriname	QN Sport	Free	Live	Live	Live	Live	Live	HDTV.
Sweden	V Sport	Pay	Live	Live	Live	Live	Live	Available in Ultra HD. Rights until 2029.
Switzerland	SRG SSR	DVB-T Free in Switzerland, DVB-S Encrypted on Eutelsat Hot Bird 13°E (EU)	Live	Live	Live	Live	Live	The qualifyings and the races are broadcast on RSI La 2, RTS Deux and SRF zwei. Rights until 2021.
Switzerland	Canal+	Pay	Live	Live	Live	Live	Live	Rights until 2029.
Switzerland	Sky Sport F1	Pay	Live	Live	Live	Live	Live	Available in Ultra HD. Rights until 2027.
Taiwan	CTS	Pay	No	No	No	Live/Delayed	Live/Delayed	Terrestrial and cable TV broadcast.
Taiwan	Videoland	Pay	No	No	No	Live	Live	Cable TV broadcast. Rights until 2029.
Taiwan	ELTA	Pay	No	No	No	Live/Delayed	Live/Delayed	Chunghwa Telecom MOD broadcast. Rights until 2029.
Tajikistan	Varzish TV	Free	No	No	No	sometimes delayed	sometimes delayed	
Thailand	beIN Sports	Pay	Live	Live	Live	Live	Live	Sky Sports F1 coverage. Rights until 2030. HDTV 1080i.
Turkey	beIN Sports	Pay	Live	Live	Live	Live	Live	Rights until 2033.
Ukraine	Setanta Sports	Pay	No	No	No	Live	Live	SD/HD Feed.
United Kingdom (including Gibraltar)	Channel 4	DVB-T Free in UK, DVB-S FTA on Astra 28.2°E (UK)	Live	Live	Live	Live	Live	HDTV complete British Grand Prix Weekend, highlights of all other qualifying and races
United Kingdom (including Gibraltar)	Sky Sports F1	Pay	Live	Live	Live	Live	Live	Available in Ultra HD. Rights until 2034.
United States (including Puerto Rico)	Apple TV	Partial	Live	Live	Live	Live	Live	All practice sessions and select race weekends are free to watch on Apple TV app and all other sessions on via F1 TV. Rights until 2030.
Vietnam	TV360	Pay	Live	Live	Live	Live	Live	Rights until 2028.

=== Radio broadcasters ===
Country	Network	Language	Notes
Brazil	BandNews FM	Portuguese	
Belgium	Grand Prix Radio Belgium	Dutch	
Denmark	Danmarks Radio	Danish	
Hungary	Kossuth Rádió	Hungarian	
Italy	Rai Radio 1	Italian	
Netherlands	NPO Radio 1	Dutch	
Netherlands	Grand Prix Radio Netherlands	Dutch	
Slovenia	Val 202	Slovene	
Spain	Radio Marca	Spanish	
Spain	Cadena SER	Spanish	
Spain	Cadena COPE	Spanish	
United Kingdom	BBC Radio 5 Live	English	Rights until the end of 2027
United Kingdom	BBC Radio 5 Sports Extra	English	Rights until the end of 2027
United States	SiriusXM	English	Simulcast from BBC Radio 5 Live. Rights until 2027.
Canada	SiriusXM	English	Simulcast from BBC Radio 5 Live. Rights until 2027.

=== Official internet broadcasters ===
Country	Website	Free/pay	Practice 1	Practice 2	Practice 3	Qualifying	Race	Notes
Worldwide	F1 TV	Pay	Live	Live	Live	Live	Live	Live video of all races in select regions only. In the United States, access to races on F1 TV are only available via an Apple TV subscription.
Worldwide	YouTube	Free	Highlights	Highlights	Highlights	Highlights	Highlights	F1 TV Commentary with race highlights.
Worldwide	Formula One App	Free	Live	Live	Live	Live	Live	Audio only; with BBC Sport commentary
Asia^{1}	BeIN Sports Connect	Pay	Live	Live	Live	Live	Live	Rights until 2030.
Australia	Network 10	Free	Live	Live	Live	Live	Live	Australian Grand Prix only
Australia	Foxtel Now	Pay	Live	Live	Live	Live	Live	All races live
Australia	Kayo Sports	Pay	Live	Live	Live	Live	Live	All races live
Brazil	Globoplay	Free	Live	Live	Live	Live	Live	Rights until 2028.
Canada	TSN+	Pay	Live	Live	Live	Live	Live	
Canada	RDS Direct	Pay	No	No	No	Live	Live	All practices live for Canadian Grand Prix
China	Tencent Sports	Partial	Live	Live	Live	Live	Live	All practice, most races free; all qualifying paywalled
France	MyCanal	Pay	Live	Live	Live	Live	Live	
Germany	Sky Go	Pay	Live	Live	Live	Live	Live	Rights until 2027. Exclusive coverage from 2021.
Greece	ΑΝΤ1+	Pay	Live	Live	Live	Live	Live	Only for viewers in Greece. Rights until 2025.
Hungary	Mediaklikk	Free	Live	Live	Live	Live	Live	All races live
India	FanCode	Pay	Live	Live	Live	Live	Live	Rights until 2028
Italy	Sky Go	Pay	Live	Live	Live	Live	Live	
Italy	Now	Pay	Live	Live	Live	Live	Live	
Japan	Fuji TV On Demand	Pay	Live	Live	Live	Live	Live	Available in Ultra HD. Rights until 2030.
Latin America^{2}	Disney+	Pay	Live	Live	Live	Live	Live	16:9 SD/HDTV feed. Exclusive TV rights until 2028. Available in Mexico and Argentina as well
Malaysia	RTMKlik	Free	Live	Live	Live	Live	Live	Bahrain Grand Prix held in Malaysia only in 2026.
Mexico	Sky+	Pay	Live	Live	Live	Live	Live	Rights until 2028.
Mexico	Izzi Go	Pay	Live	Live	Live	Live	Live	Rights until 2028.
New Zealand	Sky Go	Pay	Live	Live	Live	Live	Live	
New Zealand	Sky Sport Now	Pay	Live	Live	Live	Live	Live	
Nordic countries, Baltic countries, Netherlands^{3}	Viaplay	Pay	Live	Live	Live	Live	Live	Viaplay streams the broadcast of Viasat Motor HD and Viasat Sport. Viaplay is available on web-apps, PS3, PS4, Xbox 360, Xbox One, Windows 8.x, smart-TV, Android and iOS (phones and tablets). One hour with highlights from Viasat Motor (via Viasat's Viafree). Commercials every 15 min.
Portugal	DAZN	Pay	Live	Live	Live	Live	Live	
Romania	AntenaPLAY	Pay	Live	Live	Live	Live	Live	Rights until 2026.
Spain	DAZN	Pay	Live	Live	Live	Live	Live	
Sub-Saharan Africa	DStv Stream	Pay	Live	Live	Live	Live	Live	SuperSport (Sky Sports F1) coverage
Taiwan	ELTA OTT	Pay	No	No	No	Live	Live	Only for viewers in Taiwan. Commercial-free Sky Sports F1 Coverage on ELTA Sports MAX channels; Broadcast replay on ELTA OTT last for 48 hours.
Taiwan	Chunghwa Telecom Hami Video	Pay	No	No	No	Live	Live	Only for viewers in Taiwan. Commercial-free Sky Sports F1 Coverage on ELTA Sports MAX channels; Broadcast replay on ELTA OTT last for 48 hours.
United Kingdom	Channel 4	Free	Live	Live	Live	Live	Live	British Grand Prix only; highlights streamed as live broadcast and available for 7 days
United Kingdom	Sky Go	Pay	Live	Live	Live	Live	Live	
United Kingdom	Now	Pay	Live	Live	Live	Live	Live	
United Kingdom	BBC Sounds	Free	Live	Live	Live	Live	Live	audio only; UK only
United States	Apple TV	Partial	Live	Live	Live	Live	Live	All practice sessions and select race weekends are free to watch on Apple TV app. All other sessions paywalled via F1 TV with Apple TV Subscription. Rights until 2031.
Vietnam	TV360	Pay	Live	Live	Live	Live	Live	Rights until 2028.

^1– Rights in Brunei, Cambodia, Hong Kong, Indonesia, Laos, Malaysia, Philippines, Singapore, Thailand and Timor Leste.
^2– Rights in Central America, South America (except Brazil) and the Caribbean.
^3– Rights in Denmark, Estonia, Finland, Iceland, Latvia, Lithuania, Netherlands, Norway and Sweden.

== World Feed producers ==
=== Current producers ===
Since the 2023 season, all of the races are produced by FOM.

Grand Prix	Circuit	Broadcaster	Year
Bahrain	Sakhir	FOM	2004–2010, 2012–
Saudi Arabian	Jeddah Corniche	FOM	2021–
Australian	Melbourne	FOM	2004–2019, 2022–
Japanese	Suzuka	FOM	2012–2019, 2022–
Chinese	Shanghai	FOM	2004–2019, 2024–
Miami	Miami	FOM	2022–
Emilia Romagna	Imola	FOM	2020–2022, 2024–
Monaco	Monte Carlo	FOM	2023–
Canadian	Montreal	FOM	2005–2008, 2010–2019, 2022–
Spanish	Catalunya	FOM	2007–
Austrian	Red Bull Ring	FOM	2014–
British	Silverstone	FOM	2007–
Hungarian	Hungaroring	FOM	2007–
Belgian	Spa-Francorchamps	FOM	2007–
Dutch	Zandvoort	FOM	2021–
Italian	Monza	FOM	2007–
Azerbaijan	Baku	FOM	2017–2019, 2021–
Singapore	Marina Bay	FOM	2008–2019, 2022–
United States	Circuit of the Americas	FOM	2012–2019, 2021–
Mexico City	Mexico City	FOM	2021–
São Paulo	Interlagos	FOM	2021–
Las Vegas	Las Vegas Strip	FOM	2023–
Qatar	Losail	FOM	2021, 2023–
Abu Dhabi	Yas Marina	FOM	2009–

=== Former producers (1950–2022) ===
Below are the previous World Feed Producers for Grands Prix from 1950 until 2022.

- Between 1997 and 1999 the Brazilian GP World Feed was produced by FOM. What was shown was a reduced version of the F1 Digital+ main feed, mainly lacking onboard angles and without the pay per view graphics. Rede Globo continued to produce an alternative National Feed for Brazilian viewers.
- In 2001 and 2002 the US Grand Prix was broadcast locally by ABC Sports. However, they did not ever produce the World Feed.
- In 1991, the French GP was broadcast in France by La Cinq, which held rights for F1.

Grand Prix	Circuit	Broadcaster	Years
Australian	Adelaide	Nine Network	1985–1995
Australian	Melbourne	Nine Network	1996–2002
Australian	Melbourne	Network 10	2003
Argentine	Buenos Aires	Canal 7	1972, 1974-1975, 1977-1981
Argentine	Buenos Aires	Telefe	1995–1998
Austrian	Red Bull Ring	ORF	1970–1978, 1980–1987, 1997–2003
Austrian	Red Bull Ring	WIGE	1997–2003
Belgian	Spa-Francorchamps	RTBF	1965, 1985–2002, 2004–2005
Belgian	Spa-Francorchamps	BRT	1966, 1983
Belgian	Nivelles-Baulers	RTBF	1972, 1974
Belgian	Circuit Zolder	RTBF	1973, 1975, 1977–1978
Belgian	Circuit Zolder	BRT	1976, 1979–1982, 1984
Brazilian	Interlagos	Globo	1973–1977, 1979, 1990–1996, 2000–2007
Brazilian	Interlagos	FOM	1997–1999, 2008–2019
Brazilian	Interlagos	Band	1980
Brazilian	Jacarepaguá	Globo	1978, 1981–1989
British	Silverstone	BBC Sport	1953–1954, 1956, 1958, 1971, 1973, 1975, 1977, 1979, 1981, 1983, 1985, 1987–1996
British	Silverstone	ITV Sport	1960, 1963, 1965, 1967, 1969, 1997–2006
British	Brands Hatch	ITV Sport	1968, 1970
British	Brands Hatch	BBC Sport	1964, 1966, 1972, 1974, 1978, 1980, 1982, 1984, 1986
British	Aintree	BBC Sport	1957, 1959, 1961–1962
Canadian	Circuit Mont-Tremblant	CTV	1968, 1970
Canadian	Mosport Park	CTV	1969
Canadian	Montreal	CTV	1978–1982
Canadian	Montreal	CBC	1983–1986, 1988–2004
Caesars Palace	Caesars Palace	NBC Sports	1981–1982
Dallas	Dallas	CBS Sports	1984
Detroit	Detroit	ABC Sports	1982
Detroit	Detroit	CBS Sports	1983–1988
Dutch	Zandvoort	NTS	1955, 1960–1963
Dutch	Zandvoort	NOS	1965–1966, 1971, 1973–1985
Dutch	Zandvoort	Nederland 1	1967, 1969–1970
European	Brands Hatch	BBC Sport	1983, 1985
European	Donington Park	BBC Sport	1993
European	Nürburgring	ARD	1984
European	Nürburgring	RTL Television	1995–1996, 1999–2006
European	Nürburgring	WIGE	1995–1996, 1999–2006
European	Nürburgring	FOM	2007
European	Jerez	Telecinco	1994, 1997
European	Valencia	FOM	2008–2012
European	Baku	FOM	2016
French	Reims-Gueux	ORTF	1960–1961, 1963, 1966
French	Rouen-Les-Essarts	ORTF	1962, 1964
French	Circuit de Charade	ORTF	1965, 1969–1970, 1972
French	Circuit de la Sarthe	ORTF	1967
French	Paul Ricard	FR2	1971
French	Paul Ricard	ORTF	1973
French	Paul Ricard	TF1	1975–1976, 1978, 1980, 1982–1983, 1985–1990
French	Paul Ricard	FOM	2018–2019, 2021–2022
French	Dijon-Prenois	TF1	1974, 1977, 1979, 1981, 1984
French	Magny-Cours	TF1	1991–2006
French	Magny-Cours	FOM	2007–2008
German	Nürburgring	ARD	1962, 1964–1967, 1969, 1971–1975
German	Nürburgring	ZDF	1963, 1985
German	Nürburgring	FOM	2009, 2011, 2013
German	Hockenheimring	ZDF	1970, 1978, 1980–1981, 1984, 1988–1989
German	Hockenheimring	ARD	1977, 1979, 1982–1983, 1986–1987
German	Hockenheimring	RTL Television	1990–2006
German	Hockenheimring	WIGE	1990–2006
German	Hockenheimring	FOM	2008, 2010, 2012, 2014, 2016, 2018–2019
Hungarian	Hungaroring	Magyar Televízió	1986–2001
Hungarian	Hungaroring	RTL Television	2002–2006
Hungarian	Hungaroring	WIGE	2002–2006
Indian	Buddh	FOM	2011–2013
Italian	Monza	RAI	1953–1956, 1959, 1961–1979, 1981–2006
Italian	Imola	RAI	1980
Japanese	Fuji	TBS	1976–1977
Japanese	Fuji	Fuji Television	2007–2008
Japanese	Suzuka	Fuji Television	1987–2006, 2009–2011
Korean	Korea	FOM	2010–2013
Luxembourg	Nürburgring	RTL Television	1997–1998
Luxembourg	Nürburgring	WIGE	1997–1998
Malaysian	Sepang	TV3	1999–2003
Malaysian	Sepang	RTM	1999–2003
Malaysian	Sepang	FOM	2004–2017
Mexican	Mexico City	Canal 2	1963–1970
Mexican	Mexico City	Imevisión	1986–1992
Mexican	Mexico City	FOM	2015–2019
Monaco	Monte Carlo	TMC	1959–2019, 2021–2022
Pacific	TI Circuit	Fuji Television	1994–1995
Portuguese	Estoril	RTP	1984–1996
Portuguese	Algarve	FOM	2020–2021
Russian	Sochi	FOM	2014– 2021
San Marino	Imola	RAI	1981–2006
South African	Kyalami	SABC	1976–1980, 1982–1985
South African	Kyalami	DStv	1992–1993
Spanish	Jarama	TVE	1968, 1970, 1972, 1974, 1976–1979, 1981
Spanish	Montjuïc	TVE	1969, 1971, 1973, 1975
Spanish	Jerez	TVE	1986–1989
Spanish	Jerez	TV3	1990
Spanish	Catalunya	TV3	1991–2006
Tuscan	Mugello	FOM	2020
Turkish	Istanbul	FOM	2005–2011, 2020–2021
United States	Watkins Glen	ABC Sports	1961, 1966-1967, 1974
United States	Watkins Glen	CBS Sports	1962-1966, 1975–1978
United States	Watkins Glen	Mizlou	1979–1980
United States	Phoenix	ESPN	1989–1991
United States	Indianapolis	Fox Sports Net	2000
United States	Indianapolis	F1 Digital+	2002
United States	Indianapolis	FOM	2002, 2005–2007
United States	Indianapolis	Speed Channel	2003–2004
United States West	Long Beach	CBS Sports	1976–1981

== Commentators ==
Language	Broadcasters	Lap-by-lap commentator	Co-commentator(s)	Reporter(s)	Studio host(s)	Studio analyst(s)
Arabic	(Middle East and North Africa) beIN Sports	Ayman Abdel Wahed	—N/a	Stephany Saad	Paul Fadel	Khalil Beschir
Azerbaijani	(Azerbaijan) Idman TV	Siyavush Aliyev	Rahim Aliyev			
Chinese	(China) Tencent Sports	Jin Haonan	Chao Yiwen; Liu Yao			
Chinese	(China) CCTV	Li Chenming	Maiziyan			
Chinese	(China) Great Sports	Li Bing	Ye Fei; Zhou Haoran; Pan Yongyong			
Croatian	(Croatia) RTL	Ivan Blažičko	Neven Novak; Anđelko Kecman; Ante Vetma		Filip Brkić	Ivan Blažičko, Neven Novak
Cyprus	Omega TV Cyprus	Demetris Yiokkas	Frixos Masouras			
Czech	(Czech Republic) Nova Sport	Števo Eisele	Josef Král; Pavel Fabry			
Danish	(Denmark) Viaplay	Jens Hansen	Tom Kristensen	—N/a	Peter Palshøj	Nicolas Kiesa, Jason Watt
Dutch	(Belgium) Play Sports	Kris Wauters	Sam Dejonghe; Gert Vermersch			
Dutch	(Netherlands) Viaplay	Nelson Valkenburg	Melroy Heemskerk	Chiel van Koldenhoven	Amber Brantsen	Christijan Albers, Tom Coronel, Mike Hezemans, Ho-Pin Tung, Giedo van der Garde
English	F1 TV	Alex Jacques	David Coulthard; Jolyon Palmer	Ariana Bravo; Chris Medland; Lawrence Barretto	Laura Winter; Betty Glover; James Hinchcliffe	Ruth Buscombe, Alex Brundle, Sam Collins, James Hinchcliffe, Juan Pablo Montoya, Alice Powell, Davide Valsecchi
English	(United Kingdom) Channel 4	Alex Jacques	David Coulthard; Jolyon Palmer	Lee McKenzie; Ariana Bravo; Lawrence Barretto	Steve Jones; Lee McKenzie; Ariana Bravo; Alex Jacques (Sprint Qualifying)	Billy Monger, Alice Powell, Mark Webber
English	(United Kingdom) Sky Sports F1	David Croft (main); Harry Benjamin (fill-in)	Martin Brundle (main); Karun Chandhok (secondary); Anthony Davidson (secondary)	Ted Kravitz (pitlane); Craig Slater	Simon Lazenby; Natalie Pinkham	Jenson Button, Jamie Chadwick, Bernie Collins, Nico Rosberg, Naomi Schiff, Jacques Villeneuve
English	(United Kingdom) BBC Radio 5 Live & F1 Radio	Harry Benjamin (main); Ben Edwards (secondary)	Sam Bird; Damon Hill; Alice Powell; Marc Priestley	Rosanna Tennant; Jennie Gow	Steve Crossman	Andrew Benson
Finnish	(Finland) Viaplay	Niki Juusela	Toni Vilander	Mervi Kallio	Katariina Kiviranta	Heikki Kovalainen, Emma Kimiläinen, Mika Salo, Ossi Oikarinen
French	(Belgium) La Une/Tipik	Gaëtan Vigneron				
French	(Canada) RDS	Pierre Houde	Bertrand Houle; Patrick Carpentier			
French	(France) Canal+	Julien Febreau	Romain Grosjean; Jacques Villeneuve	Laurent Dupin; Pauline Sanzey	Margot Laffite	Jean Alesi, Éric Boullier, Loïc Duval, Franck Montagny, Julien Simon-Chautemps
French	(Switzerland) RTS 1/RTS 2	Fabrice Jaton	Luc Domenjoz			
German	(Austria) ORF	Ernst Hausleitner	Alexander Wurz	Alina Eberstaller		
German	(Austria) ServusTV	Andreas Gröbl	Mathias Lauda; Philipp Eng; Philipp Brändle	Daniel Goggi	Andrea Schlager	Christian Klien
German	(Germany) RTL	Heiko Waßer	Christian Danner	Kai Ebel	Florian König	Guenther Steiner
German	(Germany) Sky Sport	Sascha Roos	Ralf Schumacher; Timo Glock	Sandra Baumgartner	Peter Hardenacke	
German	(Switzerland) SRF zwei	Oliver Sittler	Marc Surer; Simona de Silvestro			
Greek	(Greece) ANT1	Takis Pournarakis	Panos Seitanides; Georgis Markogiannis			
Hungarian	(Hungary) M4 Sport	Gábor Wéber	Dániel Nagy	Máté Ujvári; Lőrinc Pattantyús-Ábrahám	Robert Bobák	Norbert Michelisz, Norbert Kiss
Icelandic	(Iceland) Viaplay	Kristján Einar Kristjánsson	Bragi Þórðarson			
Italian	(Italy) Sky Sport	Carlo Vanzini	Marc Gené; Roberto Chinchero	Mara Sangiorgio	Davide Camicioli	Vicky Piria, Ivan Capelli, Matteo Bobbi
Japanese	(Japan) Fuji TV NEXT	Ryosuke Horiike	Motoyasu Moriwaki; Ukyo Katayama	Kazuhito Kawai		
Korean	(South Korea) Coupang Play	Ahn Hyung-jin	Yoon Jae-soo	Jin Se-min (selected races)		
Norwegian	(Norway) Viaplay	Atle Gulbrandsen	Henning Isdal; Stein Pettersen; Thomas Schie			
Polish	(Poland) Eleven Sports	Michał Gąsiorowski	Mikołaj Sokół	Mikołaj Kamiński	Aldona Marciniak; Marcin Kuźbicki	Bartosz Budnik, Marcin Budkowski, Filip Kapica, Robert Smoczynski
Portuguese	(Brazil) TV Globo	Everaldo Marques	Luciano Burti; Mariana Becker	Marcelo Courrege; Julia Guimarães; Guilherme Pereira	Alessandro Jodar	Antonella Bassani, Caio Castro
Portuguese	(Brazil) SporTV	Bruno Fonseca	Christian Fittipaldi; Felipe Giaffone; Rafael Lopes	Marcelo Courrege; Julia Guimarães; Guilherme Pereira		
Portuguese	(Portugal) DAZN	Óscar Gois	Henrique Chaves; João Carlos Costa	Rui Chagas	João Amaral	Lourenço da Veiga, Nuno Pinto
Russian	Setanta Sports Eurasia	Elmir Valeev				
Serbian	(Serbia) Arena Sport	Srđan Erceg; Pavle Živković	—N/a	—N/a	Marina Sekulić	Srđan Erceg, Pavle Živković
Spanish	F1 TV	Luis Manuel López	Luis Díaz; Michel Jourdain Jr.			
Spanish	ESPN (Latin America)	Fernando Tornello	Juan Manuel López	Albert Fabrega; Juan Fossaroli	Alejandra Martínez	
Spanish	(Argentina) Fox Sports	Andrés Agulla	Adrian Puente; Florencia Andersen			
Spanish	(Mexico) Sky Sports	Sergio Rodríguez	Mario Domínguez; Manuel Barrera; Sam Reyes			
Spanish	(Spain) DAZN	Antonio Lobato	Pedro de la Rosa; Toni Cuquerella	Christine GZ; Diego Campoy	Melissa Jiménez; Tomás Slafer	Roldán Rodríguez, Pablo Lorente, Xesc Ripoll
Swedish	(Sweden) Viaplay	Janne Blomqvist	Björn Wirdheim; Rickard Rydell			
Turkish	(Turkey) beIN Sports	Serhan Acar	Jason Tahincioğlu	Elif Gökalp	Gökhan Telkenar	Korhan Savran
Ukrainian	Setanta Sports Eurasia	Maksym Podzigun				
Vietnamese	Viettel Telecom	Việt Phương	Hoàng Minh			

== Criticisms of the broadcasts ==
The World Feed produced by the local broadcaster was often criticised for focusing heavily on local drivers and teams, especially by international viewers and critics during the late 1980s and early 1990s, whilst missing key moments of the race. The FOM digital feed also came under criticism for missing key live moments, including the infamous crash at the start of the 1998 Belgian Grand Prix. In contrast, the local broadcaster managed to broadcast the entire incident. This is due to the nature of the FOM TV production style, which is story-based, tending to focus on a particular situation of the race (in order to 'tell a story' to the audience), thus delaying the cut to other live situations (like yellow flags, overtakes or incidents), and in that particular occasion in Spa 1998, the FOM broadcast was focusing on the lead of the race, completely missing one of the most iconic moments in the history of Formula One.

The differences between the local broadcaster and the FOM TV production styles could have been observed until the 2022 Monaco Grand Prix, which was the last F1 World Feed to be ever produced by a host broadcaster, Tele Monte Carlo. FOM tends to focus on story, while Tele Monte Carlo focused heavily on live situations, cutting very rapidly, sometimes erratically, from the lead of the race to the back of the field, even to the pit, depending on what was live happening in the race, using static cameras (most notably in the tunnel). One such instance in the 2021 race led to a replay of Lance Stroll hitting a kerb at the Piscine Pool being played over his teammate Sebastian Vettel's duel with Pierre Gasly on lap 32. The video became an internet meme. From the 2023 Monaco Grand Prix, FOM uses dynamic-zooming cameras, more story-focused segments and frequent pan-outs to the city skyline, depending on what was supposed to be the focus of the story to tell to the audience.

Being geographically based in the UK, FOM has been accused several times for focusing heavily on British drivers and UK-based teams, by increasing their team radio broadcasting and video coverage. This was particularly notable during the 2024 Abu Dhabi Grand Prix, where FOM only showed live cameras from McLaren as opposed to also showing Ferrari's.

More recently, the FOM World feed has been criticised for becoming too show-based (much like the Netflix series Formula 1: Drive to Survive) and less faithful to factual and action-based broadcasting. This was evident during the 2025 Chinese Grand Prix, where Ferrari team principal Fred Vasseur criticised FOM TV production for distorting and cutting radio communications between Lewis Hamilton and his engineer in order to add more drama to the event. On 24 March 2025, FOM denied the accusations, stating not all radio communications between Hamilton and his engineer were broadcast due to other situations in the race.
