= F1 Digital+ =

- The UK F1 Digital+ logo
- Country: Germany, France, Italy, Netherlands, Finland, Sweden, United Kingdom, Poland, Spain

Programming
- Picture format: 576i (PAL) 4:3

Ownership
- Owner: Formula One Management

History
- Launched: July 1996
- Closed: 12 December 2002

F1 Digital+ (also known as just F1 Digital) was the name of the enhanced world feed package for Formula One coverage that existed from 1996 to 2002.

The service offered additional features to the standard, single analogue television feed of the sport, which digital broadcasters had the option of taking up and broadcasting on their own digital interactive television platforms (at a higher price than the standard television feed, which often necessitated the broadcasters charging viewers for), such as channels dedicated to onboard cameras, cameras in the pit area, additional cameras focusing on action involving cars lower down the running order and live timing data. The programmes were all broadcast commercial-free. The service was also dubbed 'Bernie-Vision' as it was run by the former F1 commercial rights holder Bernie Ecclestone.

== Service launch ==
Another alternative F1 Digital+ logo that appears on broadcasts

The service launched at the 1996 German Grand Prix. Initially the service was only offered by the German-based DF1 service, broadcasting into Germany, Austria and Switzerland. The French broadcaster Canal Plus, also signed up for the service in 1996, with a ten-year contract estimated to be costing $60 million per year. Italian broadcaster TELE+ signed up at the beginning of the 1997 season. Spanish broadcaster Canal Satelite Digital joined at the beginning of the 1998 season. British broadcaster BSkyB however did not offer the service until later.

An initial investment of $35 million was made to set up the service. By the time the service closed, over $100 million had been spent on it.

The race coverage shown on regular terrestrial TV was produced by a local broadcaster (the host broadcaster) and provided to all other broadcasters around the world. By comparison, the majority of the coverage shown on the F1 Digital+ service was produced on-site at each Grand Prix venue by Formula One Management. The operation involved transporting around 200 tons of equipment to each race. To transport the equipment required 18 trucks for European rounds or two Boeing 747 jumbo jets for fly-away races. At the race venue, a 1200 sq m air-conditioned tent was set up containing the majority of the equipment. The service was run by Eddie Baker, and the tent was colloquially referred to as Bakersville.

Two hundred staff were employed to provide the coverage. A two-week turn around was required to dismantle and reassemble all the equipment. Dismantling would begin immediately following a race broadcast on Sunday and would be finished by Tuesday. It would then be transported to the next venue. Between Friday and Sunday the broadcast centre would be reassembled and all cameras and cabling around the circuit would be completed by Wednesday. The equipment was tested on Thursday in preparation for the first broadcast of a race meeting on Friday.

The initial offering consisted of five different channels, as well as a sixth "Super-Signal" channel, which combined footage from the first 4 individual channels listed below. This "Super-Signal" feed was similar in style to what was available on the regular terrestrial broadcasts, however it differed in that it had access to more cameras, had extra graphics including a lap counter and broadcast radio conversations conducted by the teams. Team radio was first heard at the 2000 Brazilian Grand Prix. The first channel showed action from the trackside cameras as well as onboard and pitlane. A second channel focused on showing action that was taking place involving cars lower down the running order. The third channel consisted entirely of material from the onboard cameras of the cars whilst the fourth consisted of material from the cameras located in the pit-lane running a highlights reel of action from the race up to that point, every 20 minutes. The fifth channel transmitted the data screens available to the teams at the circuit, showing timing information (positions, laptimes etc.)

From 1999, a new design for the graphic overlays was introduced to distinguish it from the standard coverage, and to incorporate new features such as race control updates. At the 2002 United States Grand Prix, the digital feed was available free on the normal channels, such as ITV. Although the option to change to a different camera was not available, the coverage was more extensive, featuring the overlays, additional cameras and team radio from the channel. The last race that F1 Digital+ showed live was the 2002 Japanese Grand Prix.

=== United States ===
ABC Sports used the service for its coverage of the 2001 United States Grand Prix and four grands prix in 2002 (the Monaco Grand Prix, Canadian Grand Prix, Italian Grand Prix, and United States Grand Prix). For its telecast of the 2001 US Grand Prix, ABC decided to supply its own commentary team of Bob Jenkins and Eddie Cheever. In 2002, ABC used the default UK commentary team of Ben Edwards and John Watson.

== Launch in the UK ==
After negotiations with BSkyB as far back as 1996 and with onDigital, the UK version of the service was launched in 2002 as a dedicated channel on Sky, as a joint venture between BSkyB and FOM originally contracted to run for two years. The service was commentated on by Ben Edwards and John Watson, with pit lane reports from Peter Windsor.

Take-up for the service, charged at £12 per race, was low with as little as 9,000 viewers subscribing to see some races, compared with audiences of 3 million viewers for some Formula One races on UK free-to-air television that season.

To increase the flagging take-up, F1 Digital+ ran a promotion where one could get the final six races of the season for only £50 compared with paying £72.

Although the service was at the cutting-edge of sports broadcasting, it was never financially viable and was terminated at the end of the 2002 season with the loss of 220 jobs. Technical limitations at the time also added to the problems. Sky+ boxes, which could record and time-shift other broadcasts, refused to do so with this – the transmission had to be viewed live.

=== Channels ===
The initial six channels was expanded to eight with the addition of a new UK exclusive Master channel, produced by FOM, incorporating additional studio programs before and after the on-track sessions, as well as cutting into the Super-Signal during the session, with in-vision interviews. An eighth dedicated highlights channel was added, showing rolling highlights up to the current point in the race.

- Master - A studio channel (produced exclusively for the United Kingdom by FOM at their studios in Biggin Hill), which was presented by Matt Lorenzo and featured discussion from guests including Damon Hill and Perry McCarthy and showing footage from the super-signal (the main FOM-produced Digital feed) during the track sessions, cutting away to show features such as in-vision interviews and live studio analysis during the race.
- Super-signal - Also abbreviated to 'Super', this was the main digital world feed produced by FOM for all of Europe, combining footage from the below two track feeds, the Pit lane channel and the onboard channel.
- Track A - Similar to the super-signal, but focusing on the leaders of the race.
- Track B - Again, similar to the super-signal, yet focusing on action involving cars lower down the running order.
- Data - Live timing and data screens
- Onboard - Consisted entirely of material from the cars' onboard cameras, without any commentary.
- Pitlane - Footage entirely from cameras in the pit-lane, without any commentary.
- Highlights - Rolling highlights up to the current point in the race.

== Impact ==
Although F1 Digital+ was a commercial failure, many of the innovations the service offered were gradually implemented on the main Formula One World Feed over the following seasons. In 2004 new television overlays were introduced which closely reflected those of F1 Digital+, reintroducing elements such as the lap counter, track status indicators and rev counters. Team Radio was broadcast at the 2004 Chinese Grand Prix and in 2005 at the Australian, Malaysian, Bahrain, Canadian, United States, Turkish and Chinese races before it became available at every race from the 2006 season onwards.

The biggest innovation of pay per view was a permanent production team at every Grand Prix, establishing consistent quality over the variable nature of host broadcasters. The success of F1 Digital+ in this area resulted in Formula One Management gradually taking control of the World Feed in the subsequent seasons. From the 2007 season Formula One Management directed the TV coverage of all but three races, and for the 2008 season this number was reduced to two: the Monaco Grand Prix, produced by Télé Monte Carlo, and the Japanese Grand Prix, produced by Fuji Television.

=== F1 TV Pro ===
In May 2018, 16 years after the end of F1 Digital+, the FOM launched its F1 TV Pro OTT service, starting from the 2018 Spanish Grand Prix under the new owner of Formula 1 Liberty Media. The service can be considered a direct successor to F1 Digital+. It includes access to FOM SuperSignal transmission from all TV stations. Exclusive are access to all onboard cameras of all drivers as well as three additional image signals and uncensored team radio (there had not been any since the end of F1 Digital+). The service is advertised exclusively over the Internet and can be booked through a monthly subscription or as an annual subscription to F1.com. The F1 TV Pro service has suffered from reliability issues that were reported in 2019 and 2020.

As of 2023, all the events are produced and directed by F1 TV, now owned by Liberty Media.

=== Other media ===
The overlays were used in the games Formula One 2002 and Formula One 2003 for the Spectator Mode option.

== Digital World Feed production ==
Grand Prix	Circuit	Years
(Argentina) Argentine Grand Prix	Autódromo Oscar Alfredo Galvez	1997–1998
(Australia) Australian Grand Prix	Melbourne Grand Prix Circuit	1997–2002
(Austria) Austrian Grand Prix	A1 Ring	1997–2002
(Brazil) Brazilian Grand Prix	Autódromo José Carlos Pace	1997–2002
(Belgium) Belgian Grand Prix	Circuit de Spa-Francorchamps	1996–2002
(United Kingdom) British Grand Prix	Silverstone Circuit	1997–2002
(Canada) Canadian Grand Prix	Circuit Gilles Villeneuve	1997–2002
(Europe) European Grand Prix	Circuito de Jerez	1997
(Europe) European Grand Prix	Nürburgring	1999–2002
(France) French Grand Prix	Circuit de Nevers Magny-Cours	1997–2002
(Germany) German Grand Prix	Hockenheimring	1996–2002
(Hungary) Hungarian Grand Prix	Hungaroring	1996–2002
(Italy) Italian Grand Prix	Autodromo Nazionale Monza	1996–2002
(Japan) Japanese Grand Prix	Suzuka Circuit	1996–2002
Luxembourg Grand Prix	Nürburgring	1997–1998
Monaco Grand Prix	Circuit de Monaco	1997–2002
(Malaysia) Malaysian Grand Prix	Sepang International Circuit	1999–2002
(Portugal) Portuguese Grand Prix	Autódromo do Estoril	1996
San Marino Grand Prix	Autodromo Enzo e Dino Ferrari	1997–2002
(Spain) Spanish Grand Prix	Circuit de Catalunya	1997–2002
United States Grand Prix	Indianapolis Motor Speedway	2000–2002
