= Oikarinen =

Oikarinen is a Finnish surname. Notable people with the surname include:

- Toivo Oikarinen (1924–2003), Finnish cross country skier
- Jarkko Oikarinen (born 1967), Finnish computer scientist
- Ossi Oikarinen (born 1970), Finnish engineer
