= Chautemps =

Chautemps is a surname. Notable people with the surname include:

- Camille Chautemps (1885–1963), French politician
- Émile Chautemps (1850–1918), French politician
- Jean-Louis Chautemps (1931–2022), French jazz saxophonist
- Julien Simon-Chautemps (born 1978), French motor racing engineer
