= Laura Winter =

British sports presenter

Laura Winter (born 31 March 1989) is a sports presenter, event host and commentator, specializing in Formula One, rugby and cycling, amongst a variety of other sports. As well as presenting British Cycling's road and cyclocross coverage on Eurosport, BBC and ITV4, she is Voxwomen's dedicated presenter for the monthly Voxwomen Cycling Show which is broadcast on multiple channels worldwide. She is also the NBC reporter and commentator for the Tour of California women's race.

== Education ==
She attended Loughborough University, where she obtained her bachelor's degree in English in 2010. She graduated from Pate's Grammar School in 2007.

== Career ==
Her first job was in social media and communications with the World Rowing Federation. She worked there for two years before becoming a freelance presenter. At the 2014 Commonwealth Games, Winter was a stadium presenter for netball. She also booked various gigs in women's cycling, cricket, tennis, football, and rugby, among other sports.

A former rower, Winter has been the Henley Royal Regatta's reporter for BT Sport since 2017.

In 2019, Winter presented four rounds of the World Rallycross Championship. From this role, she received a recommendation to Formula One Management to work as a track TV presenter.

In 2020, Winter started her own podcast called 'Lessons Learned', where she interviews notable figures in the sports industry.

She hosted the Tour de France Femmes for Eurosport in August 2024.

=== Formula One media ===
Winter made her debut in Formula One presenting at the 2019 Belgian Grand Prix. From 2020 to 2024, she made many appearances as a presenter for F1 TV's pre-race and post-race show with co-hosts Will Buxton and correspondent Lawrence Barretto. She is a lead presenter for the 2025 Formula One season on F1 TV alongside Barretto, Jolyon Palmer, Ruth Buscombe, James Hinchcliffe, and others.

Winter is an advocate for women in motorsport. In February 2024, former Red Bull Team Principal Christian Horner was investigated for inappropriate workplace behaviour and sexual misconduct with a female employee, which resulted in the complainant's suspension. Among tensions in the F1 environment, while presenting for the 2024 Saudi Arabian Grand Prix, Winter said, "To the women and girls in motorsport, to the huge and growing numbers of female fans in this sport, here is a very good reminder for all of us. We are here to stay and we are right where we belong." Her speech went viral on multiple social media platforms, including TikTok.

== Personal life ==
She was raised in Cheltenham, England. Winter was a competitive swimmer for twelve years.

On International Women's Day in 2019, Winter was violently attacked by her then boyfriend, ending up in hospital. As a result of the domestic violence, she experienced PTSD. She hopes speaking about her own struggle with trauma can help others talk about the repercussions of violence and abuse, and encourage them to come forward and seek help safely.

She is engaged to Louie-Paul Jaspal. They have one child together, a son.

== See also ==
- F1 TV
