= Formula One 2002 (video game) =

2002 video game

- Developer(s): Studio Liverpool
- Publisher(s): Sony Computer Entertainment
- Series: Formula One
- Platform(s): PlayStation 2
- Release: EU: 1 November 2002; JP: 20 February 2003
- Genre(s): Racing
- Mode(s): Single-player, multiplayer

Formula One 2002 is a racing video game developed by Studio Liverpool and published by Sony Computer Entertainment for the PlayStation 2. It is a sequel to the 2001 video game Formula One 2001 and was based on the 2002 Formula One World Championship.

The first issues of this game came with a DVD of the 2001 Formula One World Championship that was not commercially released which featured multi-angles and footage from the defunct F1 Digital+, a pay-per-view service which allowed the purchaser access to multiple camera shots, sessions and a choice to follow cars as the sessions progressed.

== Gameplay ==
The game features all the drivers and tracks from the 2002 Formula One World Championship, but does not represent the replacement driver that featured in the real 2002 Formula One World Championship, therefore Anthony Davidson is not featured. Although the Arrows team collapsed after the 2002 German Grand Prix in the real 2002 Formula One World Championship, players and AI can still drive Arrows cars in later Grands Prix in the game.

This marked the first Formula One game to feature the Launch Control and Traction Control despite the system being introduced prior to the 2001 Spanish Grand Prix.

== Development ==
Formula One 2002 was officially launched in November 2002, with model Gabrielle Richens acting as the face of the game.

== Alcohol related tobacco sponsors ==
All related tobacco sponsors are censored:

- Ferrari's Marlboro is completely censored.
- Jaguar's Beck's is replaced by "Best's".
- Williams' Veltins is replaced by the normal colour of the car.
- McLaren's West is replaced by "David" and "Kimi" (just as in real life).
- BAR's Lucky Strike is blocked out and replaced by "Look Alike".
- Jordan's Benson & Hedges is replaced by a bar code.
- Renault's Mild Seven is completely censored.

== Errors and mistakes ==
- On the "Race Select" mode, the A1-Ring section wrongly mentioned the 2001 pole position driver was Juan Pablo Montoya (in the real life Michael Schumacher).
- On the "Team Select" mode, the Sauber section pictured in wrong Red Bull Sauber Petronas logo instead of then-new logo.

== Reception ==
Reception

Aggregate score
Aggregator	Score
Metacritic	73/100

Review scores
Publication	Score
Computer and Video Games	6/10
Eurogamer	6/10
Famitsu	27/40
GamesMaster	67%
PlayStation Official Magazine – UK	8/10
PSM3	68%

The game received "average" reviews according to the review aggregation website Metacritic. In Japan, Famitsu gave it a score of 27 out of 40.
