= Ben Edwards (commentator) =

British motor racing commentator (born 1965)

- Born: 20 December 1965 (age 60)
- Education: Reigate Grammar School
- Occupations: Commentator, Journalist
- Employer(s): BBC, Channel 4, Formula One Management
- Spouse: Belinda

Benjamin Hugh Railton Edwards (born 20 December 1965) is a British motor racing commentator employed by Formula One, and formerly employed by Channel 4. In the past, he has voiced television coverage of Formula One, Superleague Formula and the British Touring Car Championship, in addition to Formula One DVD Reviews for Duke Video. After spending well over a decade working for networks including Eurosport, ESPN, ITV and F1 Digital +, he was named the BBC's lead TV commentator on its Formula One coverage from 2012 in December 2011. He is known for his enthusiastic and energetic commentary style. In 2022, Edwards was one of the commentators for F1TV’s Formula One racing coverage. As of June 2023, he will also assume a role as one of the main commentators in respect of Formula E.

Edwards is not to be confused with the Pick-up Truck racer of the same name.

== Career ==
=== Starting out ===
Brought up in Surrey, Edwards studied at Reigate Grammar School for five years. Edwards first started out in motorsport as a mechanic for Formula Ford teams in 1982, before beginning a career as a racing driver. He won the first Formula First championship, a now defunct championship for new drivers, and went to become champion in Caterham-Vauxhall sports cars. He also took part in the Euro Vauxhall Lotus championship where he raced against the likes of David Coulthard, who is now his co-commentator, and Mika Häkkinen.

Edwards contested the last ever Willhire 24 Hour in a Ford Escort in 1994.

Edwards first started commentating after enjoying his experience teaching racing at Brands Hatch and Snetterton. His first commentary position was for the BBC with Tiff Needell, but he became known to British viewers through his Formula One commentary on Eurosport. He was usually partnered with former Formula One race winner John Watson.

=== Champ Car ===
When Eurosport lost the rights to Formula One at the end of 1996, Edwards became the voice of Champ Car racing for viewers of Eurosport and ESPN International, also carried by Channel 5. His work alongside Jeremy Shaw was regarded as a big success.

Although Edwards was very popular with the viewers, he gradually became tired of commuting from Britain to the United States for every race. He considered moving permanently to the United States.

In 2001, Edwards was replaced by Guy Hobbs as the main Champ Car commentator, but he did commentate for the races in Japan, Detroit, Mid-Ohio, Germany, Houston and Australia when Hobbs had other commitments, and at the Rockingham Motor Speedway race.

=== Return to England ===
In 2002, Edwards joined ITV to commentate on the British Touring Car Championship. He also took on the role of lead commentator for F1 Digital +, and was reunited with his old colleague, John Watson. F1 Digital + finished at the end of the 2002 season, but since 2005, Watson and Edwards have been working together on Sky Sports and the international feed for A1 Grand Prix.

On occasions when British Touring Car Championship and A1 Grand Prix races clashed, Edwards was replaced on ITV by John Hindhaugh.

Edwards has also commentated on other motorsport events for Eurosport and British TV, including coverage of the British Formula Three Championship (alongside Martin Haven), and the Superleague Formula series.

=== BBC F1 ===
On 13 December 2011, it was confirmed that Edwards would replace Martin Brundle as the BBC's lead commentator for Formula One in 2012, working alongside David Coulthard. Toby Moody took Edwards' place for the BTCC in 2012. Edwards worked across BBC TV, Radio and online. Edwards made a one-off return to the BBC in 2021 for the 2021 Spanish Grand Prix, commentating on BBC Radio 5 Live, filling in for Jack Nicholls. He also replaced Nicholls for the 2021 French Grand Prix. Following Nicholls's departure from the BBC following allegations of inappropriate behaviour in 2023, Edwards has been one of the BBC's and F1 Radio rotating lead commentators.

=== Channel 4 F1 ===
In 2016, Edwards moved to Channel 4 to continue commentating on Formula 1, again working alongside David Coulthard. The move came after the BBC terminated its TV rights agreement early, and Channel 4 picked the deal up. Edwards stepped down from his commentary role at Channel 4 after the conclusion of the 2020 season. He was succeeded by Alex Jacques. However he subsequently filled in for Jacques at the 2021 Styrian Grand Prix and 2021 Austrian Grand Prix when Jacques had to self-isolate after Billy Monger tested positive for COVID-19.

=== F1TV ===
In 2022, Edwards rejoined the Formula One Media team at its Biggin Hill headquarters to lead the commentary for F1TV's worldwide output. In this role, he commentated alongside former Formula One driver Jolyon Palmer. For the 2023 and 2024 British Grands Prix he substituted for F1TV Live as Alex Jacques was commentating for Channel 4. However this did not happen in 2025 meaning the 2024 British Grand Prix is the last race he commentated on for F1TV.

== Personal life ==
Edwards, with his wife Belinda, runs Entreprix Ltd., a "motorsports specialist" company. Founded in 1987, the company has managed numerous motorsport championships, the most recent being the British GT Championship from 2003 to 2005. He currently resides in Wortham, Suffolk.

== Racing record ==
=== Complete British Saloon Car Championship results ===
(key) (Races in bold indicate pole position – 1980–1990 in class) (Races in italics indicate fastest lap – 1 point awarded ?–1989 in class)

Year	Team	Car	Class	1	2	3	4	5	6	7	8	9	DC	Pts	Class
1986	Brands Hatch Racing School	Ford Escort XR3i	**XR3i**	SIL	THR	SIL	DON	BRH	SNE	BRH ovr:18 cls:6	DON	SIL	NC	0	NC
