= 2019 Austrian Darts Open =

Tournament information
- Dates: 3–5 May 2019
- Venue: Premstättner Halle
- Location: Graz, Austria
- Organisation(s): PDC
- Format: Legs
- Prize fund: £140,000
- Winner's share: £25,000
- High checkout: 170 (Netherlands) Michael van Gerwen

Champion(s)
- (Netherlands) Michael van Gerwen

The 2019 Austrian Darts Open was the fifth of thirteen PDC European Tour events on the 2019 PDC Pro Tour. The tournament took place at Premstättner Halle in Graz, Austria, from 3–5 May 2019. It featured a field of 48 players and £140,000 in prize money, with £25,000 going to the winner.

Jonny Clayton was the defending champion after defeating Gerwyn Price 8–5 in the final of the 2018 tournament, but he was defeated 6–2 in the second round by Tytus Kanik.

Michael van Gerwen won his third Austrian Darts Open title (and his 32nd in total on the European Tour) with an 8–7 win over Ian White in the final.

== Prize money ==
This is how the prize money is divided:

Stage (num. of players)		Prize money
Winner	(1)	£25,000
Runner-up	(1)	£10,000
Semi-finalists	(2)	£6,500
Quarter-finalists	(4)	£5,000
Third round losers	(8)	£3,000
Second round losers	(16)	£2,000*
First round losers	(16)	£1,000
Total	£140,000	

- Seeded players who lose in the second round do not receive this prize money on any Orders of Merit.

== Qualification and format ==
The top 16 entrants from the PDC ProTour Order of Merit on 4 April will automatically qualify for the event and will be seeded in the second round.

The remaining 32 places will go to players from six qualifying events – 18 from the UK Tour Card Holder Qualifier (held on 12 April), six from the European Tour Card Holder Qualifier (held on 12 April), two from the West & South European Associate Member Qualifier (held on 2 May), four from the Host Nation Qualifier (held on 2 May), one from the Nordic & Baltic Associate Member Qualifier (held on 1 February) and one from the East European Associate Member Qualifier (held on 9 March).

From 2019, the Host Nation, Nordic & Baltic and East European Qualifiers will only be available to non-tour card holders. Any tour card holders from the applicable regions will have to play the main European Qualifier.

The following players will take part in the tournament:

Top 16

1. (Netherlands) Michael van Gerwen (champion)
2. (Wales) Gerwyn Price (quarter-finals)
3. (England) Ian White (runner-up)
4. (Northern Ireland) Daryl Gurney (semi-finals)
5. (England) Adrian Lewis (quarter-finals)
6. (England) Rob Cross (third round)
7. (Austria) Mensur Suljović (third round)
8. (Scotland) Peter Wright (quarter-finals)
9. (Wales) Jonny Clayton (second round)
10. (England) James Wade (semi-finals)
11. (England) Michael Smith (second round)
12. (England) Dave Chisnall (second round)
13. (England) Joe Cullen (second round)
14. (Germany) Max Hopp (second round)
15. (England) Ricky Evans (second round)
16. (England) Darren Webster (second round)

UK Qualifier
- (England) Mervyn King (second round)
- (England) Andrew Gilding (first round)
- (England) Steve Beaton (quarter-finals)
- (South Africa) Devon Petersen (first round)
- (England) Stephen Bunting (third round)
- (England) Conan Whitehead (first round)
- (Republic of Ireland) Steve Lennon (second round)
- (Scotland) Jamie Bain (first round)
- (Scotland) John Henderson (second round)
- (Wales) Mark Webster (third round)
- (England) Keegan Brown (third round)
- (England) Nathan Aspinall (third round)
- (England) Chris Dobey (second round)
- (England) Ross Smith (first round)
- (Scotland) Mark Barilli (first round)
- (England) Jamie Hughes (second round)
- (England) Ryan Searle (second round)
- (England) Mark Wilson (first round)

European Qualifier
- (Lithuania) Darius Labanauskas (third round)
- (Netherlands) Raymond van Barneveld (second round)
- (Netherlands) Dirk van Duijvenbode (first round)
- (Poland) Tytus Kanik (third round)
- (Netherlands) Jeffrey de Zwaan (second round)
- (Belgium) Kim Huybrechts (first round)

West/South European Qualifier
- (Netherlands) Patrick van den Boogaard (first round)
- (Brazil) Diogo Portela (first round)

Host Nation Qualifier
- (Austria) Dietmar Burger (first round)
- (Austria) Michael Rasztovits (first round)
- (Austria) Benjamin Fasching (first round)
- (Austria) Patrick Tringler (first round)

Nordic & Baltic Qualifier
- (Sweden) Johan Engström (first round)

East European Qualifier
- (Russia) Boris Koltsov (second round)

== Draw ==
First round (best of 11 legs); 3 May
(Scotland) Jamie Bain 79.17	1
(Republic of Ireland) Steve Lennon 88.53	6
(England) Stephen Bunting 87.20	6
(Netherlands) Patrick van den Boogaard 85.05	4
(England) Andrew Gilding 96.56	5
(England) Chris Dobey 95.76	6
(Austria) Dietmar Burger 83.19	2
(Poland) Tytus Kanik 90.41	6
(Brazil) Diogo Portela 78.11	1
(England) Ryan Searle 88.14	6
(Belgium) Kim Huybrechts 87.27	2
(England) Nathan Aspinall 87.69	6
(Russia) Boris Koltsov 91.37	6
(Sweden) Johan Engström 80.68	5
(Wales) Mark Webster 87.61	6
(Netherlands) Dirk van Duijvenbode 80.40	1
(England) Ross Smith 73.53	4
(Scotland) John Henderson 81.00	6
(Lithuania) Darius Labanauskas 103.98	6
(Austria) Michael Rasztovits 86.00	1
(Netherlands) Raymond van Barneveld 87.62	6
(England) Mark Wilson 80.77	1
(England) Mervyn King 89.31	6
(South Africa) Devon Petersen 84.21	4
(Netherlands) Jeffrey de Zwaan 87.33	6
(Austria) Benjamin Fasching 75.36	1
(Scotland) Mark Barilli 82.65	3
(England) Steve Beaton 88.47	6
(England) Jamie Hughes 79.65	6
(Austria) Patrick Tringler 78.69	3
(England) Conan Whitehead 89.86	4
(England) Keegan Brown 96.59	6

Second round (best of 11 legs); 4 May
1	(Netherlands) Michael van Gerwen 106.09	6
(Republic of Ireland) Steve Lennon 81.41	0
16	(England) Darren Webster 82.68	0
(England) Stephen Bunting 92.02	6
8	(Scotland) Peter Wright 89.17	6
(England) Chris Dobey 87.88	5
9	(Wales) Jonny Clayton 83.66	2
(Poland) Tytus Kanik 88.87	6
5	(England) Adrian Lewis 92.68	6
(England) Ryan Searle 86.87	5
12	(England) Dave Chisnall 100.78	4
(England) Nathan Aspinall 100.40	6
4	(Northern Ireland) Daryl Gurney 92.18	6
(Russia) Boris Koltsov 93.51	2
13	(England) Joe Cullen 92.06	5
(Wales) Mark Webster 85.20	6
2	(Wales) Gerwyn Price 91.67	6
(Scotland) John Henderson 91.67	3
15	(England) Ricky Evans 99.47	3
(Lithuania) Darius Labanauskas 102.85	6
7	(Austria) Mensur Suljović 93.62	6
(Netherlands) Raymond van Barneveld 97.19	4
10	(England) James Wade 94.88	6
(England) Mervyn King 88.72	2
6	(England) Rob Cross 93.32	6
(Netherlands) Jeffrey de Zwaan 93.88	5
11	(England) Michael Smith 96.09	4
(England) Steve Beaton 102.41	6
3	(England) Ian White 94.75	6
(England) Jamie Hughes 96.00	5
14	(Germany) Max Hopp 88.90	4
(England) Keegan Brown 88.14	6

Third round (best of 11 legs); 5 May
1	(Netherlands) van Gerwen 100.59	6
(England) Bunting 79.53	1
8	(Scotland) Wright 97.83	6
(Poland) Kanik 89.02	5
5	(England) Lewis 90.08	6
(England) Aspinall 87.39	1
4	(Northern Ireland) Gurney 93.54	6
(Wales) M. Webster 87.90	2
2	(Wales) Price 94.84	6
(Lithuania) Labanauskas 91.92	4
7	(Austria) Suljović 96.26	3
10	(England) Wade 102.88	6
6	(England) Cross 98.16	2
(England) Beaton 100.47	6
3	(England) White 86.45	6
(England) Brown 82.32	1

Quarter-finals (best of 11 legs); 5 May
1	(Netherlands) van Gerwen 89.28	6
8	(Scotland) Wright 92.29	5
5	(England) Lewis 85.71	5
4	(Northern Ireland) Gurney 84.75	6
2	(Wales) Price 96.06	4
10	(England) Wade 93.36	6
(England) Beaton 87.38	2
3	(England) White 101.53	6

Semi-finals (best of 13 legs); 5 May
1	(Netherlands) van Gerwen 102.60	7
4	(Northern Ireland) Gurney 95.33	3
10	(England) Wade 97.13	4
3	(England) White 101.15	7

Final (best of 15 legs); 5 May
1	(Netherlands) van Gerwen 101.22	8
3	(England) White 99.88	7
