= Alex Jacques =

Sports commentator (born 1989)

- Born: 28 March 1989 (age 37); Suffolk, United Kingdom
- Occupation: Sports Commentator
- Years active: 2015–present
- Known for: Sports commentator
- Website: https://alexjacques.co.uk/

Alex Jacques is a sports commentator and broadcaster who serves as the lead commentator for Formula One. He was formerly a commentator for the Formula 1 feeder series GP2 and FIA Formula 2 Championship until 2024. Jacques is the lead commentator on F1 TV and Channel 4, and won Commentator of the Year award in the 2022 Broadcast Sports. Jacques' voice has been used in the official Formula One video games since the 2022 edition and the Netflix documentary Drive to Survive.

== Career ==
He is from Ipswich, Suffolk. Prior to commentating, Jacques studied Politics in University and worked on his university's newspaper and radio station, as well as his local hospital's radio. His first break was with BBC covering local football. Eventually, he started taking on bigger games with teams such as Manchester United or Liverpool in the Premier League in Norwich City, and covered other sports such as Cricket and eventually, GP3. Additionally, he also worked a day job as a news reporter for the Times.

In 2015, Jacques got the opportunity to commentate in GP2 races after Will Buxton announced a surprise departure. In what Jacques describes as an 'extreme slice of luck', he was hired to join the commentary box alongside Jolyon Palmer and Davide Valsecchi. His commentary in the first few races he participated in was met with criticism, but eventually he was able to improve and fans warmed up to him. When GP2 rebranded to Formula 2, he continued commentating on it.

During this time, he also offered commentary in Formula Three (F3; the rebranded GP3 championship) and Esports, and also worked on the BBC Radio 5 Live. In 2018, Jacques started commentating on F1 races for F1TV, and covered the 2020 Indianapolis 500 for Sky Sports. In 2021, he took over Channel 4's chief commentating duties, replacing the retiring Ben Edwards. Jacques also provided commentary on the all-woman W Series championship from the 2021 and 2022 seasons and stopped commentating on F3 following the conclusion of the 2021 season. He was part of Discovery+'s commentary team that provided coverage of the 24 Hours of Le Mans in 2023 and 2024.

In 2024, Jacques announced that he would be retiring from F2 commentary after 10 years, citing the need to spend more time with his family and to focus on Formula One. In October 2025, Jacques published the book Grid To Glory: 75 Milestone Formula One Moments on 75 years of Formula One racing.

Following Channel 4 gaining the rights to broadcast The Boat Races in 2026, it was announced Jacques would take over as the lead commentator from Andrew Cotter.
