= Dare to Be Different (organisation) =

Nonprofit organization

Dare to be Different is a nonprofit organisation founded by former racing driver Susie Wolff and the CEO of the Motor Sports Association Rob Jones in 2016. The organisation aims to increase the participation of women in all forms of motor racing and change the views of women in perceived male-dominated industries. Dare to be Different holds events throughout the United Kingdom and invites local school girls between the ages of eight to fourteen to partake in motor racing related activities.

== History ==
Dare to be Different was founded by former racing driver Susie Wolff and the CEO of the Motor Sports Association Rob Jones after Wolff called Jones and the latter became enthusiastic over the project. The initiative was officially launched at the Autosport International show held at the National Exhibition Centre in Birmingham on 14 January 2016. At the time women made up 5% of racing drivers in the United Kingdom. Upon its launch, Wolff stressed to the press that the organisation was something that was to be expanded in the long term rather than being disbanded after a short period of time. In 2016, Dare to be Different held five events throughout the United Kingdom to promote their cause.

== Activities ==
Dare to be Different is a nonprofit organisation whose primary objective is aimed at increasing the participation of women in all forms of motor racing regardless of age and background. It also desires to change the views of women in perceived male-dominated industries. The organisation achieved this objective by establishing an online community through social media and its official website. Dare to be Different invites local school girls between the ages of eight to fourteen to its events and are educated by women involved in motor racing. Activities that attendees are allowed to partake include kart racing, the importance of fitness, nutrition and diet, engineering, media etiquette and a tyre switch pit stop challenge. The Science, Technology, Engineering and Mathematics Network Ambassadors charity assisted in helping Dare to be Different members in constructing a hovercraft in the organisation's first year. In 2019, Dare to Be Different teamed up with the FIA Women in Motorsport Commission to launch the grassroots FIA Girls on Track – Dare to be Different aiming to encourage and influence girls utilising educational activities on motor racing-related careers.

Ambassadors of Dare to be Different include Alice Powell, the first woman driver to score a point in the GP3 Series, the deputy team principal of Williams Grand Prix Engineering Claire Williams, Sky Sports News HQ reporter Rachel Brooks, and strategy engineer Ruth Buscombe.
