= Patrick van den Boogaard =

Dutch darts player (born 1995)

Personal information
- Nickname: "Boogie"
- Born: 10 March 1995 (age 31) Dordrecht, Netherlands
- Home town: 's-Gravendeel, Netherlands

Sport
- Sport: Darts
- Playing since: 2015
- Darts: 22g Unicorn James Wade
- Laterality: Right-handed
- Walk-on music: "Welcome to the Jungle" by Guns N' Roses

Organisation (see split in darts)
- BDO: 2014–2020
- PDC: 2019–

WDF major events – best performances
- Dutch Open: Last 32: 2023

Other tournament wins
- Tournament: Years
- Six Nations Cup: 2022

Patrick van den Boogaard (born 10 March 1995) is a Dutch professional darts player who plays in Professional Darts Corporation (PDC) events.

He reached a PDC Challenge Tour event final in 2019, where he lost to Stephen Burton. He qualified for his first PDC European Tour event that year too, when he qualified for the 2019 Austrian Darts Open, but lost in the first round to Stephen Bunting.
