= Toby Moody =

British motorsport announcer

Toby William John Moody is a British sports commentator focused on motor racing. He was for many years the worldwide voice of the MotoGP series on Eurosport TV, and in 2012, lead commentator on the British Touring Car Championship for ITV4. In 2014 he commentated for ITV4 on the British Superbike Championship. He has covered several seasons of the Dakar Rally.

In 2005, Outdoor Life Network picked up the American broadcasting rights to the event, but they opted for an American host. His commentating career began when he was 20 at the Shelsley Walsh Speed Hill Climb in the UK. It led to hosting the 1995 Goodwood Festival of Speed, and the 1996 500cc World Championship Grand Prix.

When not commentating, he is the MotoGP correspondent for the autosport.com website, and hosts many manufacturer events/ press conferences for both the two and four wheeled interests including some F1 work at Monaco and at Silverstone in 2009.

His background started as a former mechanic, starting out as one at the age of 16, working for the Benetton Formula One team and Prodrive during school holidays. This expanded to a PR job for WilliamsF1, and then running the PR for the Nissan Rally Team in the UK, who won the British title twice in three years.

In the United Kingdom, Moody is a member of the organising committee for the Shelsley Walsh hillclimb, runs the official website for the British Hill Climb Championship and drives a single seater when the time allows.

2009 saw Moody claim the 600cc class record at the Shelsley Walsh hillclimb, taking 0.08 seconds off the record, achieving a time of 29.31 seconds, but since then has lowered it slightly, to 29.14 on July 18.
