= Jack Main =

Australian rules footballer (1876–1945)

Personal information
- Full name: John Alfred Main
- Born: 22 June 1876; Geelong, Victoria
- Died: 16 December 1945 (aged 69); Northcote, Victoria

Playing career^{1}
Years	Club	Games (Goals)
1907	South Melbourne	1 (1)
1911	Sturt	6 (1)
- ^{1} Playing statistics correct to the end of 1911.

John Alfred Main (22 June 1876 – 16 December 1945) was an Australian rules footballer who played with South Melbourne in the Victorian Football League (VFL) and Sturt in the South Australian Football League (SAFL).
