= Play Sports =

- Country: Belgium
- Broadcast area: Belgium
- Headquarters: Mechelen

Programming
- Language: Dutch

Ownership
- Owner: Telenet (Liberty Global)
- Sister channels: Play More

History
- Replaced: Prime Sport (2005-2012); Sporting Telenet (2012-2015)

Links
- Website: www.playsports.be

Availability

Streaming media
- Yelo Play: Watch Live (Belgium only)

Play Sports, formerly called Prime Sport (2005–2012) and Sporting Telenet (2012–2015), is a brand name owned by the Belgian cable distributor Telenet, consisting of a bundle of television channels broadcasting sports competitions from various European football leagues, including the Belgian Pro League, through television stations. In addition, Play Sports includes American NBA Basketball, American Football, and golf.

In March 2014, it also acquired the rights to broadcast Formula 1 until 2019. In July 2015, the name changed from Sporting Telenet to Play Sports. At the same time, the offer of other sports was expanded extensively, including the acquisition of the rights to the Hansgrohe Superb and World Cup cyclo-cross bicycle racing, which were previously featured on VIER and Sporza. These competitions are free to watch for all Telenet customers, but it also lost several football competitions to the new group of Eleven Sports Network. As of December 5, 2015, the offer was eventually expanded with the new channels Eleven Sports 1 and Eleven Sports 2, which have the rights to Spanish, Italian and French football competitions, NBA, NFL and ATP tennis. These channels are also included in the paying sports subscriptions of the major Proximus competitor. From the football season 2016–2017, Play Sports made the full transition to HD for its 8 multisport channels. The golf channel is also broadcast in HD. Play Sports is the first sports package that makes the full transition to HD.

Since 2020–2021, Eleven Sports got the Belgian rights to Belgian football, so Play Sports 6, 7 and 8 were replaced by Eleven Pro League 1, 2 and 3 in August 2020.

== Channels ==
- Play Sports 1 (HD)
- Play Sports 2 (HD)
- Play Sports 3 (HD)
- Play Sports 4 (HD)
- Play Sports 5 (HD)
- Play Sports 6 (HD)
- Play Sports 7 (HD)
- Play Sports GOLF (HD)
- DAZN Pro League 1* (HD)
- DAZN Pro League 2* (HD)
- DAZN 1* (HD)
- DAZN 2* (HD)
- Extreme Sports*

The * indicates an extra channel in the package that is not owned by Telenet itself.

For French viewers, the Be Sport package is available, with the VOOsport option for the Belgian football.

== Programs ==
- Weekend Round-Up
- Play Sports Classic
- Saturday Round-up
- Hoogvliegers
- Studio Live
- Fanatico
- Premier League Monday
- Voetbalcarrousel
- Kick off

== Overview offer ==
Association football:

- Pro League, Belgian Cup, and Super Cup (Belgium)
- Premier League, FA Cup, The Championship (England)
- Bundesliga, DFB Pokal (Germany)
- Serie A (Italy)
- Eredivisie, KNVB Cup, and Johan Cruyff Shield (The Netherlands)
- Ligue 1 (France)
- Premiership, Scottish Cup, League Cup (Scotland)
- Série A (Brasil)
- La Liga (Spain)
- European League

Motorsport:

- Formula 1
- Formula E
- MXGP
- WRC
- Motorcross der Nation

Golf:

- European tour
- American tour
- 4 majors
- Ryder Cup

Basketball:

- Scooore League
- European Championship
- Euroleague
- NBA

Cyclo-cross:

- Hansgrohe Superprestige Cyclocross (8 matches)
- UCI World Cup Cyclocross (9 matches)
- Select Other Cyclocross (7 matches)

Tennis:

- ATP World Tour Masters 1000 (10 Tournaments)
- ATP World Tour 250
- ATP Finals

Cycling:

- Tour de Suisse
- Tour des Fjords

Volley-ball:

- Belgium competition
- Italian competition

Hockey:

- Belgium competition
- European Championship

Handball:

- EHF Champions League
- Bundesliga

American football:

- NFL
