= Ruth Buscombe =

British strategy engineer (born 1989)

- Born: Ruth Hazel Buscombe; 21 December 1989 (age 36)
- Education: University of Cambridge
- Occupation: Strategy engineer

Ruth Hazel Buscombe (born 21 December 1989) is a British motorsport engineer and presenter for F1 TV. A first class honours graduate of the University of Cambridge Department of Engineering, she began working in Formula One with Scuderia Ferrari at its headquarters in 2012 as a race strategist. Buscombe later moved to Haas F1 Team in November 2015 to become the team's strategy engineer. She left Haas in June 2016 and was employed by Sauber three months later, helping the team finish ahead of rival Manor Racing in the 2016 Constructors' Championship. She left her position of Head of Race Strategy at Sauber at the conclusion of the 2023 season. Buscombe moved into an F1 TV presenter role. Buscombe is an ambassador for Dare to be Different.

== Biography ==
=== Early life and education ===
In an interview with The Guardian in 2017, Buscombe describes her childhood as going from "wanting to be a princess, to being an astronaut to wanting to be in F1", having become interested in motor racing at age 11. She cited Formula One engineers James Allison and Paddy Lowe as her inspiration. Buscombe was brought up in the East End of London by her parents who were doctors. She was educated at Forest School, Walthamstow, enjoying mathematics and the problem-solving aspect of the subject. Buscombe's teachers attempted to discourage her from a career in engineering because they questioned why she wanted to work in a male-dominated industry. At age 18, she narrowly avoided being killed in a road accident. Buscombe went to the University of Cambridge Department of Engineering to study Aerospace and Aerothermal Engineering. Her master's thesis was on the effect of the drag reduction system overtaking aid and was conducted in conjunction with motorsport's governing body, the Fédération Internationale de l'Automobile, with supervision from former Jaguar team principal Tony Purnell and worked with the Fédération Internationale de l'Automobile's F1 race director Charlie Whiting. Buscombe graduated with a first class honours degree in 2012.

=== Career ===
Immediately after graduation, Buscombe entered Formula One with the Scuderia Ferrari team in 2012 as a simulation development engineer where she developed and implemented algorithms. She was promoted by Ferrari to the role of a race strategist in March 2013 and worked at Ferrari's headquarters in Maranello. Buscombe oversaw the strategic decisions for driver Felipe Massa and later Kimi Räikkönen from the factory's remote garage. She remained with Ferrari throughout 2015 before leaving at the end of the season to join first-year team Haas F1 in November as their strategy engineer. Buscombe was now working at the tracks and on the pitwall. She joined the Dare to be Different campaign in February 2016.

Buscombe's strategy allowed lead driver Romain Grosjean to claim two successive top six finishes in the season's first two races in Australia and Bahrain. Following speculation of a disagreement, she left Haas in June 2016. Following its purchase by Longbow Finance the following month, Sauber employed several new personnel as part of a recruitment drive with Buscombe being hired by the team in September and starting her new job at the Malaysian Grand Prix. She formulated a strategy to allow Felipe Nasr to finish ninth in the Brazilian race, which saw Sauber overtake Manor Racing tenth in the Constructors' Championship. At the 2017 Spanish Grand Prix, she was crucial in securing the team's first points of the season, with Pascal Wehrlein’s one-stop strategy securing him eighth place.

She left her position of Head of Race Strategy at Sauber at the conclusion of the 2023 season. Buscombe moved into an F1 TV presenter and strategy analyst "for [the] 2024 season" was announced in early May in 2024. Her first appearance was in the first practice session for the 2024 Miami Grand Prix. Her first book, The Inside Track, is set to be published in October 2026.

== Personal life ==
Buscombe married former Mercedes and now Cadillac mechanic, Nathan Divey, on 3 August 2024 at the Old Marylebone Town Hall in London.
