= Julien Simon-Chautemps =

French motor racing engineer (born 1978)

- Born: 14 May 1978 (age 48)
- Education: Aerospace engineer
- Alma mater: Institut polytechnique des sciences avancées
- Title: Owner of JSC7 Engineering Ltd

Julien Simon-Chautemps (born 14 May 1978) is a French motor racing engineer. He was a race engineer at various Formula One teams from 2007 to 2022.

== Career ==
Simon-Chautemps is a graduate of the French Institut polytechnique des sciences avancées (2002). He started his career as Technical Director of Prema Powerteam (2003-2007) and then to Trident Racing (2007). He moved to Formula One in 2007. From 2007 to 2010 he was race engineer to Jarno Trulli at Toyota and Lotus. In 2011 he moved to Renault, and was engineer to Vitaly Petrov, Kimi Räikkönen, Pastor Maldonado, Romain Grosjean and Jolyon Palmer.

In 2017, Simon-Chautemps moved to Sauber. which was rebranded to Alfa Romeo in 2019. When Räikkönen joined Alfa Romeo in 2019, Chautemps became his race engineer for the second time.

In 2022, Simon-Chautemps decided to leave the Sauber team and has made his own business called JSC7 Engineering Ltd.
