= Ossi Oikarinen =

Finnish engineer (born 1970)

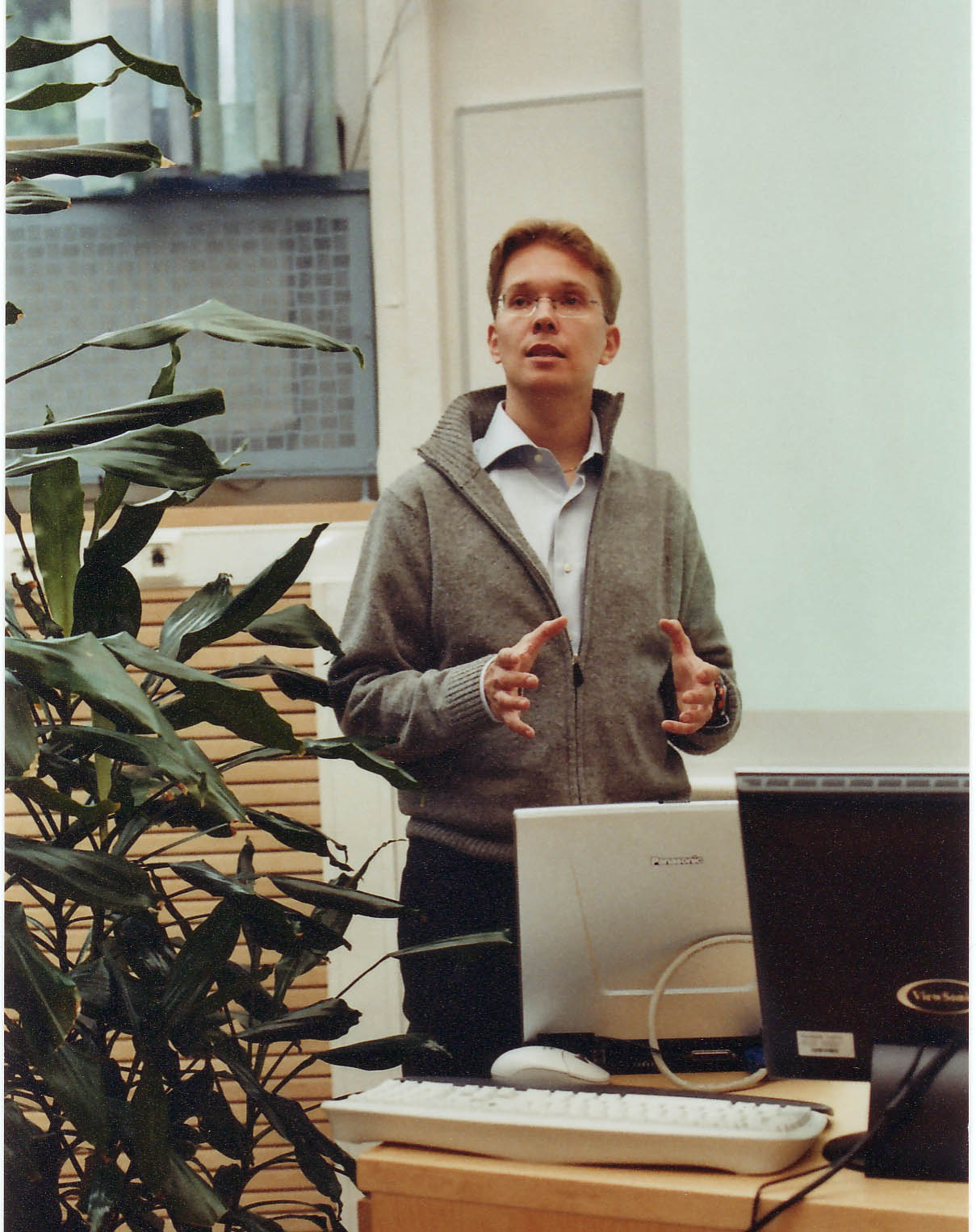
- Ossi Oikarinen in 2005
- Born: Ossi Johannes Oikarinen; 3 May 1970 (age 56)

Ossi Johannes Oikarinen (born 3 May 1970) is a Finnish engineer who works in Formula One.

== Career ==
Oikarinen began his Formula One career with Arrows in 1997 and continued in its employment until 2000. He worked at Toyota from 2001 to 2006 as race engineer for Cristiano da Matta and later Jarno Trulli and moved to BMW Sauber in 2007 and to Ferrari in 2009.
