= 2016 Spanish Grand Prix =

Formula One motor race held on 15 May 2016

Race 5 of 21 in the 2016 Formula One World Championship
← Previous race	Next race →
- Layout of the Circuit de Barcelona-Catalunya

Race details
- Date: 15 May 2016
- Official name: Formula 1 Gran Premio de España Pirelli 2016
- Location: Circuit de Barcelona-Catalunya; Montmeló, Spain
- Course: Permanent racing facility
- Course length: 4.655 km (2.892 miles)
- Distance: 66 laps, 307.104 km (190.826 miles)
- Weather: Partly cloudy 20–22 °C (68–72 °F) air temperature 39–41 °C (102–106 °F) track temperature 2 m/s (6.6 ft/s) wind from the north
- Attendance: 165,025 (Weekend)

Pole position
Driver	(United Kingdom) Lewis Hamilton	Mercedes
- Time: 1:22.000

Fastest lap
Driver	(Russia) Daniil Kvyat	Toro Rosso-Ferrari
- Time: 1:26.948 on lap 53

Podium
First	(Netherlands) Max Verstappen	Red Bull Racing-TAG Heuer
Second	(Finland) Kimi Räikkönen	Ferrari
Third	(Germany) Sebastian Vettel	Ferrari

The 2016 Spanish Grand Prix (formally known as the Formula 1 Gran Premio de España Pirelli 2016) was a Formula One motor race held on 15 May 2016 at the Circuit de Barcelona-Catalunya in Montmeló, Spain. The race was the fifth round of the 2016 FIA Formula One World Championship, and marked the forty-sixth running of the Spanish Grand Prix as a round of the Formula One World Championship. It was the twenty-sixth time that the race has been held at the circuit.

Nico Rosberg was the defending race winner and entered the round with a forty-three-point lead over teammate Lewis Hamilton in the Drivers' Championship. Their team, Mercedes, held an eighty-one point lead over Ferrari in the Constructors' Championship. Hamilton took pole position during qualifying, ahead of teammate Rosberg and Red Bull's Daniel Ricciardo.

Max Verstappen won the race upon his début for his new team Red Bull, having swapped his Toro Rosso seat with Daniil Kvyat ahead of the event. At the age of 18 years and 228 days, Verstappen became the youngest ever winner and the youngest driver to score a podium finish of a Formula One race, breaking the previous records held by Sebastian Vettel. In the process he also became the first Dutchman to win a Grand Prix and the first Grand Prix winner born in the 1990s. Both Mercedes drivers retired from the race following a collision with each other on the first lap, thus marking the only race of the 2016 season without a Mercedes driver on the podium, the first Mercedes double retirement since the 2011 Australian Grand Prix and the first time the team had not scored a point since the 2012 United States Grand Prix.

== Report ==
=== Background ===
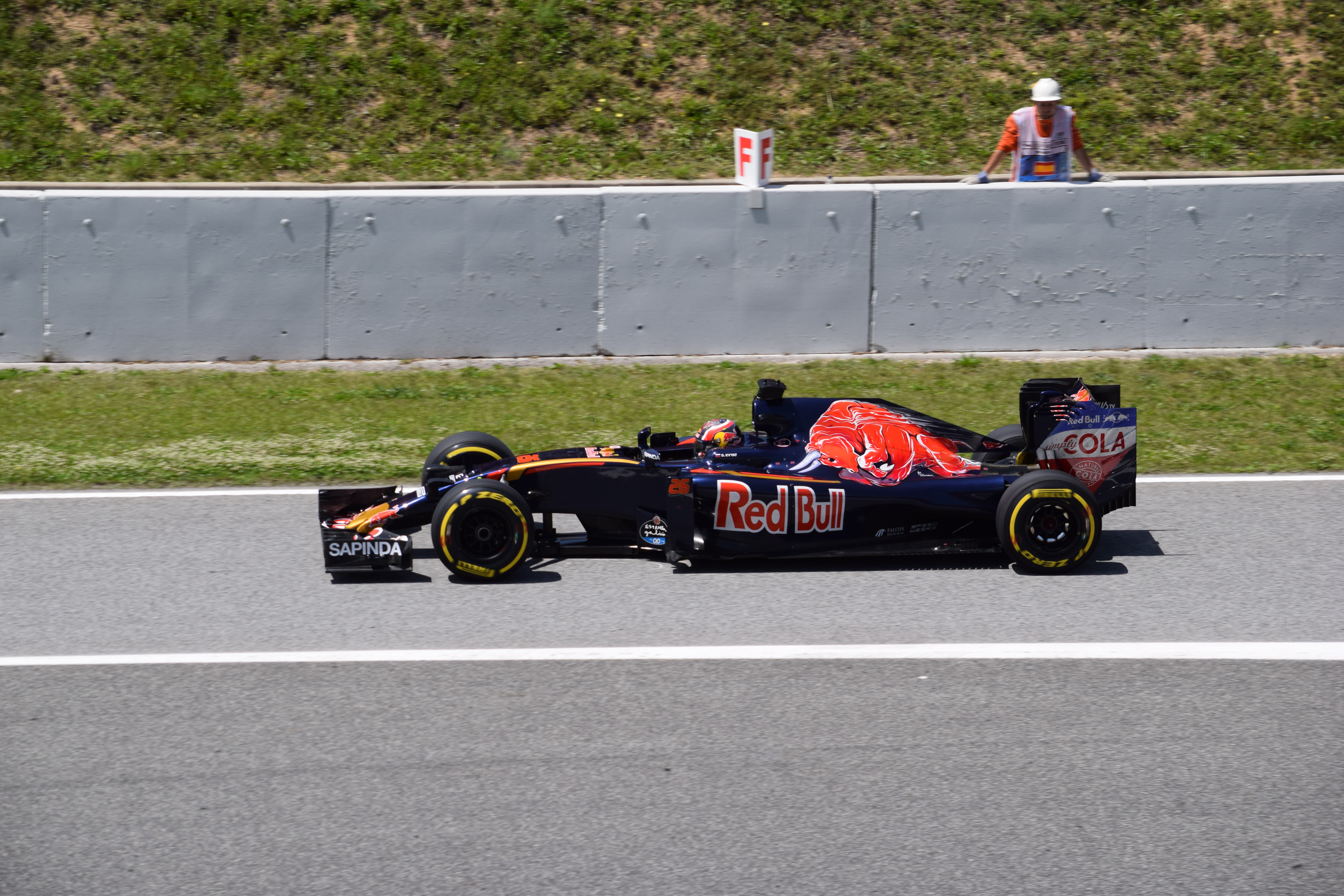
The driver swap between Daniil Kvyat (pictured) and Max Verstappen was the major talking point ahead of the race.

Daniil Kvyat and Max Verstappen traded places ahead of the race. Verstappen joined Red Bull Racing while Kvyat returned to Scuderia Toro Rosso. Red Bull's team principal Christian Horner explained the driver swap with Verstappen's talent, saying that the 18-year-old Dutchman and Daniel Ricciardo had the potential to become Formula One's best driver pairing. Furthermore, he stressed that Verstappen's move to Red Bull would tie him to the team for the foreseeable future. Daniil Kvyat meanwhile expressed surprise at the decision, saying during Thursday's press conference that he was "shocked" by his demotion, stressing that Red Bull did not give him a "real explanation".

Following problems with his power unit in both the Chinese and Russian Grand Prix, Lewis Hamilton received a redesigned MGU-H unit, in a bid to solve the troubles which hampered him earlier. However, Mercedes were unable to guarantee that the problem would not appear again.

With Spain being the first race in Western Europe, and a mid-season test coming up after the race, many teams introduced their first major car updates for the Grand Prix. Mercedes ran a new front wing with a "more pointy" nose during first free practice. Other changes were made to the engine cover and the rear wing. McLaren made more significant changes to their MP4-31, most notably on the front wing, which Sky Sports commentator Ted Kravitz called the "most intricate front wing I've ever seen". Force India updated their VJM09 to improve airflow. According to the team, they were looking for improved driveability rather than faster lap times. Renault introduced a new chassis for Jolyon Palmer. More significantly, the French manufacturer debuted a new version of their power unit for both their works team and Red Bull at the two-day test following the race. All other teams except for Sauber also made changes to their cars, with the Swiss team continuing their financial struggles. They also announced that they would be forced to miss the mid-season test, being unable to field a development driver, with regulations demanding that two out of four test days be driven by young driver talents. Both Sauber and Haas were allowed to use the updated version of Ferrari's 2016 power unit, which the works team had already used in Russia two weeks earlier.

Going into the weekend, Nico Rosberg led the Drivers' Championship, having taken the maximum number of 100 points from the first four races. Lewis Hamilton followed in second with 57 points, while Kimi Räikkönen was third with 43 points. Daniel Ricciardo followed in fourth, ahead of Sebastian Vettel. In the Constructors' standings, Mercedes was first with 157 points, 81 points clear of second-placed Ferrari. Behind them, Red Bull led fourth-placed Williams by just six points.

Sole tyre supplier Pirelli brought the hard, medium and soft tyres to the event, the first time this season to feature the orange hard tyres. As per the regulations of the 2016 season, every driver had to set aside one set each of the two hardest compounds for the race and one set of the soft tyres for Q3 (should they advance). The drivers had freedom of what other compounds they chose for the remaining ten out of thirteen sets.

=== Free practice ===
Per the regulations for the 2016 season, two 90-minute practice sessions were held on Friday and another 60-minute session was held before qualifying on Saturday. The Ferrari drivers, Sebastian Vettel and Kimi Räikkönen, set the pace in the first session, both on the soft tyre compound. The Mercedes drivers Rosberg and Hamilton followed, albeit on the medium compound, recording more timed laps than their rivals. Both Red Bull cars followed in fifth and sixth, with Daniel Ricciardo faster than new teammate Max Verstappen. Valtteri Bottas was seventh for Williams, two places ahead of teammate Felipe Massa, who at one point spun out at turn five. Upon his return to Toro Rosso, Daniil Kvyat was unable to match the pace of his teammate Carlos Sainz Jr., ending up half a second behind him. Esteban Ocon made his first free practice appearance of the season for Renault, replacing Jolyon Palmer, but was unable to set a timed lap. He suffered a tyre failure, caused by debris on the track. Force India's Sergio Pérez managed only nine laps as he spent much of the session in the pit lane after smoke emerged from the rear of his car.

Mercedes topped the time sheets in the second session, now switching to the soft compound tyres as well, with Nico Rosberg two and a half-tenths of a second clear of Kimi Räikkönen, while Lewis Hamilton was third fastest, more than seven-tenths off Rosberg's time. Räikkönen's running was interrupted for a while when he was called back into the pitlane to investigate a fuel system problem, but was able to get back out. Fernando Alonso was seventh fastest for McLaren, but needed a replacement of his car's plank after running wide over artificial grass surrounding the track. His teammate, Jenson Button, also experienced problems, having to stop at the end of the pitlane early in the session with an electrical issue. Renault's problem from the first session continued: Jolyon Palmer, back in his car in place of Ocon, suffered a tyre failure on the start-finish straight, bringing out red flags in the process. Renault and tyre supplier Pirelli were left puzzled over the failure, as in this incident, no sign of a cut from debris was found.

Nico Rosberg was again fastest in the third practice session on Saturday morning, setting a time of 1:23.078 on his first timed run, a time that stood until the end of the session. Hamilton was second, 0.126 seconds off, followed by Sebastian Vettel just two-hundredths of a second behind him. In fourth place, Max Verstappen was faster than teammate Ricciardo for the first time, who finished fifth, ahead of Räikkönen. Upon beginning his preparation laps for qualifying, Rosberg had to come back into the garage, as a sensor on his car was malfunctioning. The team was capable of repairing the damage and he went back out for the final minutes of practice. Sergio Pérez was satisfied with the eighth fastest time, saying that the car had improved "everywhere" following the updates it had received.

=== Qualifying ===
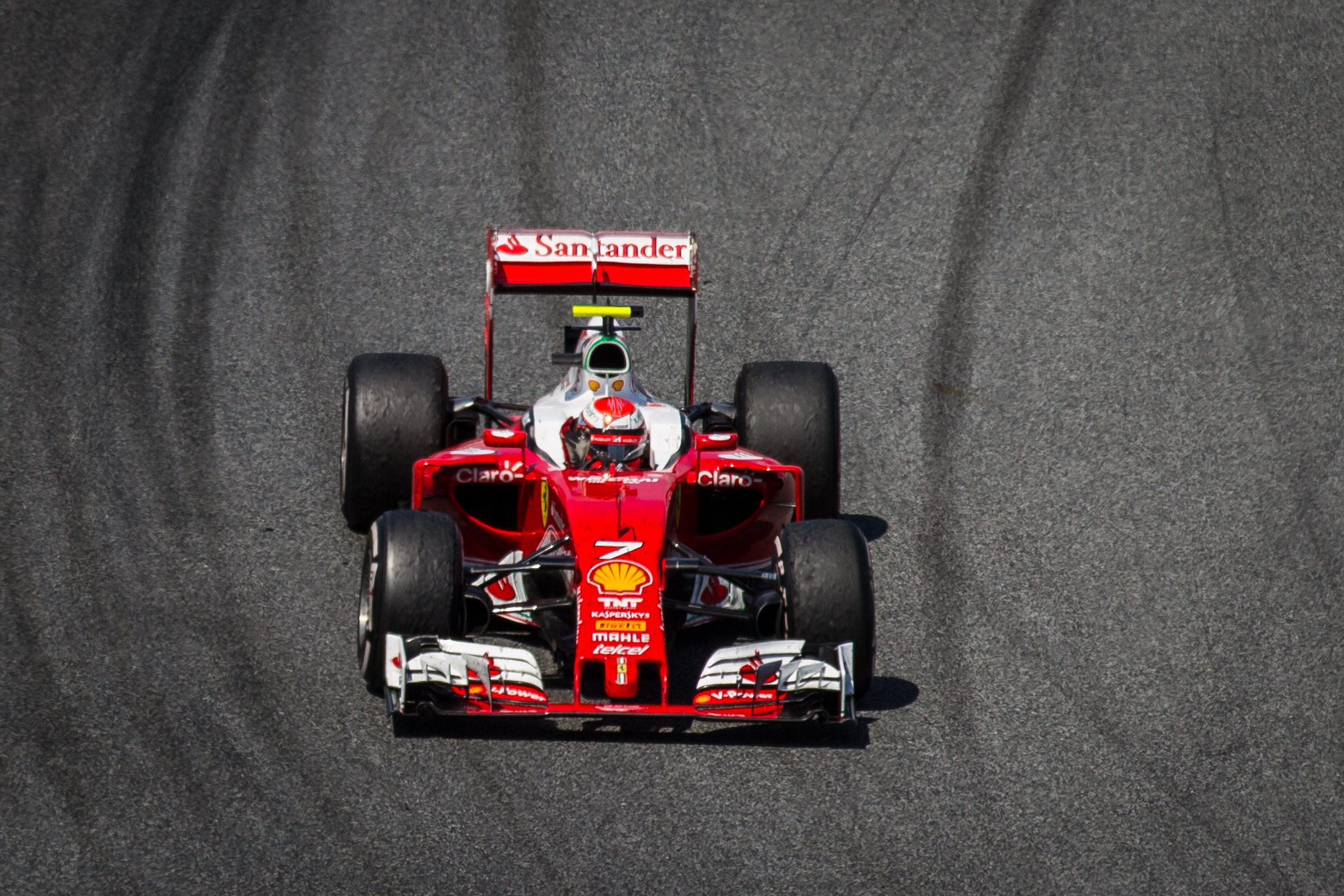
Kimi Räikkönen and Ferrari struggled in qualifying, leaving them on the third row of the grid.

Qualifying consisted of three parts, 18, 15 and 12 minutes in length respectively, with six drivers eliminated from competing after each of the first two sessions. In the first part of qualifying (Q1), Nico Rosberg set a time of 1:23.002, the fastest of the weekend up to that point, two-tenths of a second ahead of teammate Hamilton. Manor and Sauber occupied the back rows of the grid. Felipe Massa's first lap was seven-tenths of a second slower than the one from his teammate Bottas and as he was unable to set another timed lap, he became the surprise elimination in Q1, behind Jolyon Palmer, who was dropped into 17th place by a late improvement from Jenson Button.

In Q2, it was Hamilton who came out on top, exactly six-tenths of a second ahead of Rosberg. Verstappen was third fastest, ahead of Ricciardo in fifth. Kimi Räikkönen had to abandon his first fast lap after running wide in turn four, but later set a time good enough for fourth. Meanwhile, Sebastian Vettel recorded just one timed lap, saving a set of tyres and was sixth. On his return to Toro Rosso, Kvyat was eliminated in 13th place, while teammate Sainz went through to Q3. Sergio Pérez advanced as well, demoting his teammate Hülkenberg into elimination in the process, who would line up eleventh on the grid. Joining him on the sidelines for Q3 were Jenson Button in twelfth, with Romain Grosjean, Kevin Magnussen and Esteban Gutiérrez lining up behind Kvyat.

Lewis Hamilton and Nico Rosberg were the first out in Q3. Hamilton's early sector times put him on course to a new fastest lap of the weekend, but a brake lockup at turn ten ruined his lap and tyres. Nico Rosberg made no such mistake and claimed provisional pole position. As the two Ferrari drivers struggled to find pace, Max Verstappen claimed second place for the time being, before the drivers went out for their second laps. Lewis Hamilton's second flying lap bested Rosberg's time by almost three-tenths of a second, and saw him take the fifty-second pole of his career. The two Red Bull cars of Ricciardo and Verstappen followed, with Räikkönen and Vettel for Ferrari in fifth and sixth respectively, both more than a second behind Hamilton. Valtteri Bottas was best of the rest ahead of Sainz, Pérez and Alonso. It was the first appearance in Q3 for McLaren since they resumed their association with Honda in 2015.

=== Race ===
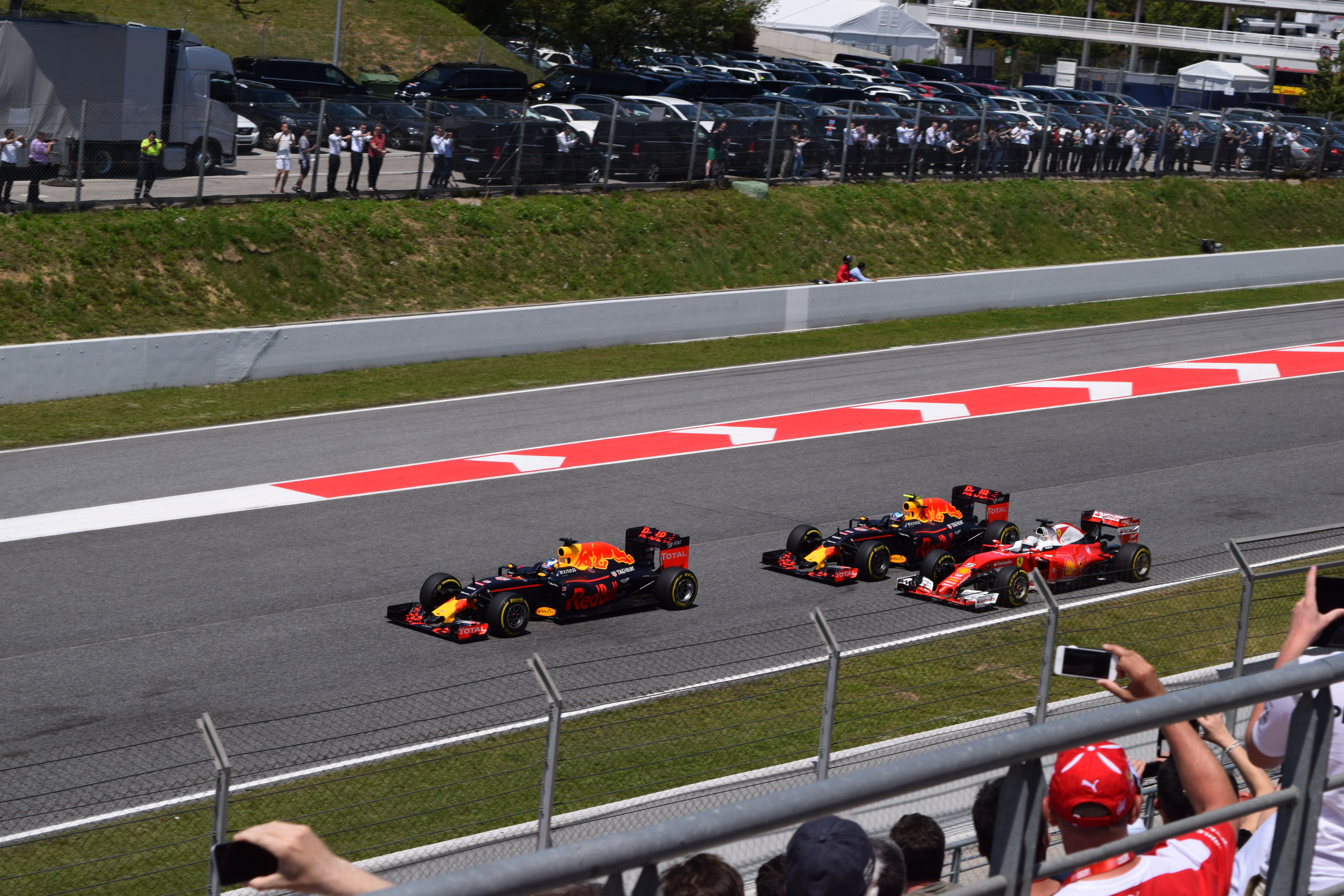
Ricciardo, Verstappen and Vettel (from left to right) fighting for the lead.

At the start, Nico Rosberg got around the outside of Hamilton in turn one, while Räikkönen lost positions due to a slow getaway. Sebastian Vettel got past Verstappen, but was immediately repassed on the approach to turn four. At the front of the race, coming out of turn three, Hamilton tried to retake the position from Rosberg. As the latter defended his position, Hamilton went off the track and spun and they collided at turn 4, ending the race of both Mercedes drivers. The collision resulted in a safety car period, with the order standing: Ricciardo, Verstappen, Sainz, Vettel and Räikkönen. The safety car came in at the end of lap four. Vettel got past Sainz on lap eight and Räikkönen tried to follow suit two laps later, but was forced off track into turn two. He completed the move one lap later at the same spot. Sainz and Button were the first to come into the pit lane for new tyres on lap 12, followed by race leader Ricciardo one lap later, making Verstappen the first Dutchman to lead a Grand Prix, before he came in another lap later. When Vettel made a pit stop on lap 16, he emerged third behind the two Red Bull drivers, all on the medium compound tyre.

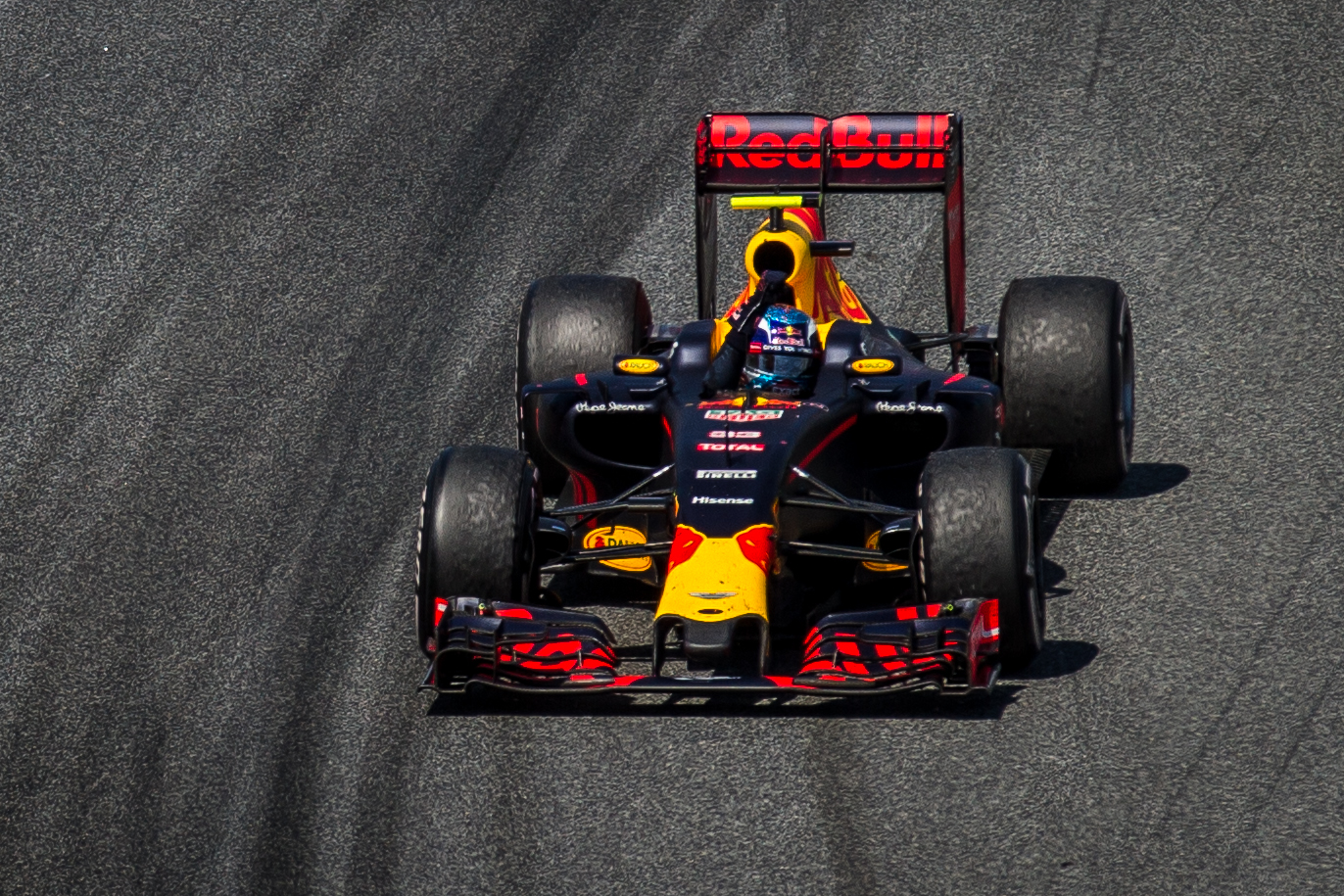
Max Verstappen celebrating victory

By lap 20, Sebastian Vettel was closing the gap to the two Red Bulls ahead of him, coming within three seconds of Verstappen. On lap 22, Nico Hülkenberg retired when his power unit caught fire and he had to stop on the sidelines. While Massa had fought from 18th on the grid into tenth, his teammate Bottas was lying fifth by lap 25, ahead of Sainz. On lap 28, Ricciardo was again the first of the front runners to pit, taking on the soft compound. Vettel came in two laps later, making the same choice in tyres. This left Verstappen to lead Kimi Räikkönen, as it emerged that both would run on a different strategy, pitting only twice in contrast to the three stopping Vettel and Ricciardo. On lap 34, the gap between the two leaders was 2.1 seconds, before Verstappen came in on the following lap. Räikkönen responded one lap later, emerging behind Verstappen. On lap 39, Vettel came in for his third and final stop, while Ricciardo stayed out for another four laps. When he returned to the track, he was behind Vettel, but on fresher tyres.

While Räikkönen closed on Verstappen at the front, Fernando Alonso's home race ended on lap 47, pulling over to the side of the track at turn three. Räikkönen managed to get into the one-second window to activate the drag reduction system (DRS), as Vettel was eight seconds behind him with Ricciardo closing on him in fourth place. By lap 57, Ricciardo was close enough to use DRS as well, but unable to pass. Three laps later, Ricciardo made an attempt at overtaking into turn one, but braking too late left him running wide, allowing Vettel back through. As the front runners lapped backmarkers, Kvyat, after scoring the first fastest lap for himself and Toro Rosso, overtook Gutiérrez for tenth place. Two laps from finish, Ricciardo suffered a puncture and was forced to pit, but retained fourth place ahead of Bottas. On the last lap, Renault drivers Kevin Magnussen and Jolyon Palmer collided, but both made it to the finish. As Verstappen crossed the finish line, he became the youngest ever and first Dutch race winner in Formula One.

=== Post-race ===
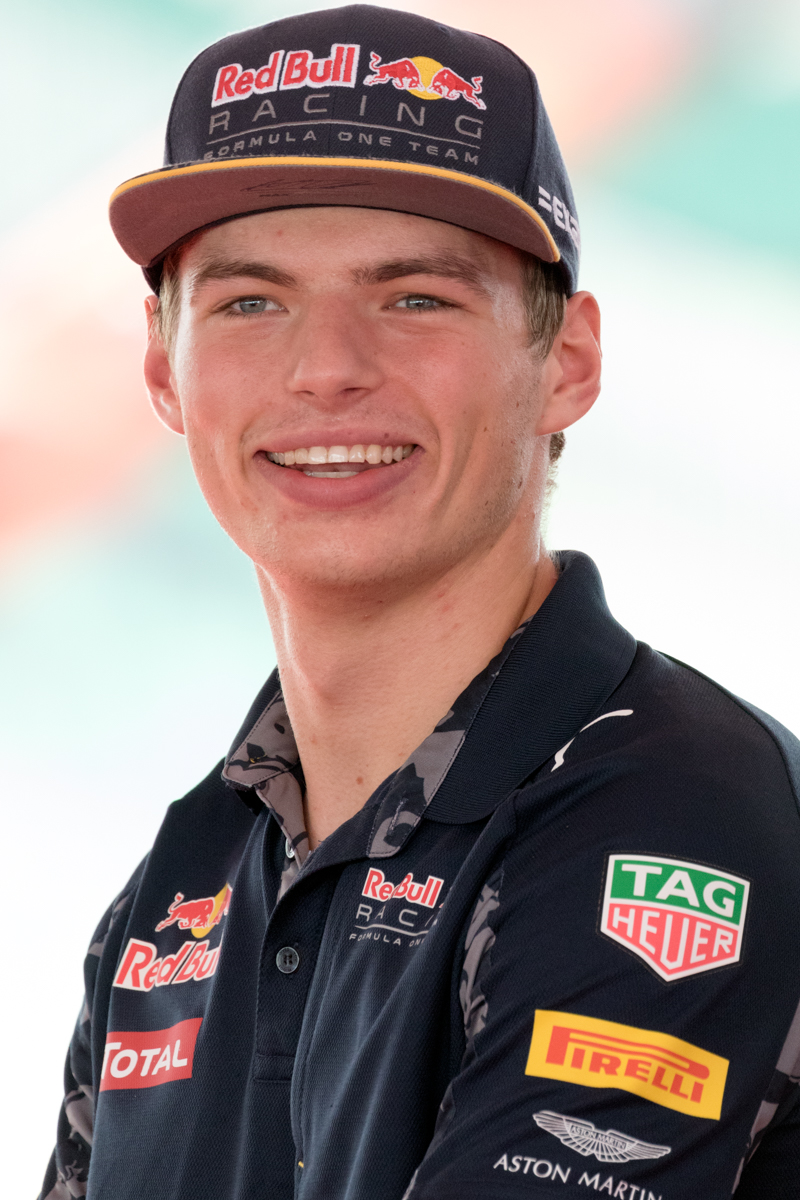
Max Verstappen (pictured in 2016) became the youngest driver to win a Formula One race, aged 18 years and 228 days.

At the podium interviews, conducted by singer Plácido Domingo, Verstappen expressed delight about a "great race", crediting his team with giving him a good car. Kimi Räikkönen said that while he was happy for Verstappen, he was disappointed not to have won. He blamed the lack of downforce while following as the reason why he had been unable to pass Verstappen. Vettel congratulated the winner as well, but lamented that his different strategy had not worked out in his favour. During the post-race press conference, Räikkönen stressed that had anyone offered the team two podium positions after their poor performance in qualifying, they would have taken it "happily". Fourth placed Ricciardo expressed bitterness over Red Bull's decision to switch him to a three-stop strategy, which eventually lost him a podium position, saying: "I'm a bit devastated. A big part of me is happy the team are on winning form but it's hard to celebrate". His team later explained their decision, declaring that they had focused their strategy on Vettel, who they had considered the biggest threat.

In the Grand Prix, Max Verstappen broke several records: apart from being the youngest ever driver to win a race at 18 years and 228 days, he also was the youngest to stand on a Formula One podium, in both instances breaking Sebastian Vettel's record set at the 2008 Italian Grand Prix by more than two years. Vettel had been 21 years and 2 months at the time. Verstappen also became the youngest driver to lead at least one lap of a Grand Prix, again overcoming a record set by Vettel, at the 2007 Japanese Grand Prix. Verstappen also was the first driver born in the 1990s to win a Grand Prix. He received considerable praise after the race, with Sky Sports F1's David Croft saying that he "has shown he has everything to be a world champion". His father Jos Verstappen, himself a former Grand Prix driver, declared that he considered his son a better driver than himself, as race wins had eluded him during his own career in the sport. French sport newspaper L'Équipe declared Verstappen to be "already a great" and "in the big leagues". Verstappen was also the first Dutchman to win a race, with the Netherlands becoming the 22nd country to produce a race winner. He was the tenth different winner of the Spanish Grand Prix in as many past editions.

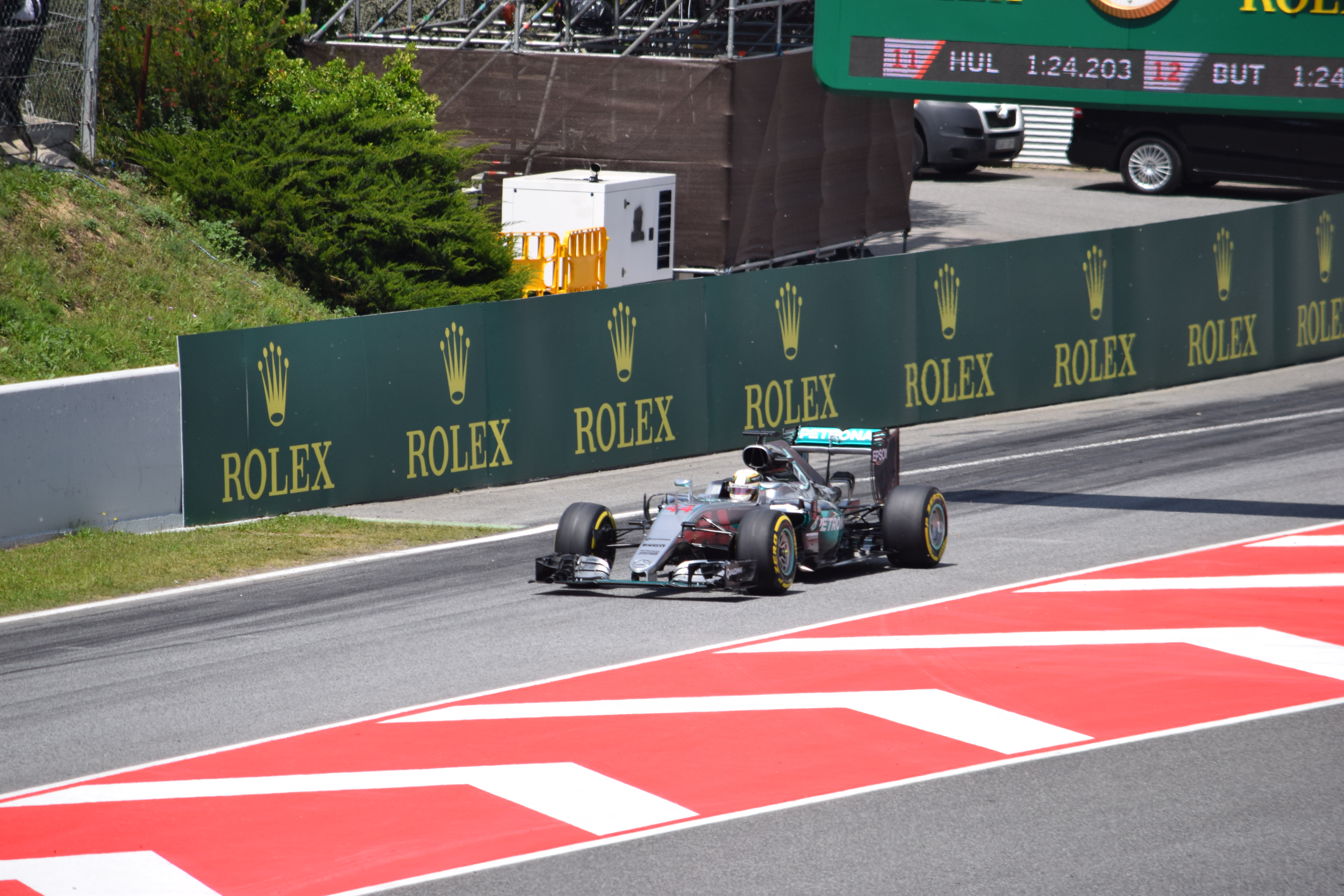
Lewis Hamilton came under criticism for his collision with teammate Nico Rosberg.

Following their collision, Hamilton and Rosberg were summoned to the stewards after the race but neither received a penalty, as the stewards rated their crash as a racing incident, with no driver in particular to blame. It emerged that Rosberg had chosen the wrong engine mode for the start, being down on power which led to Hamilton going for a passing manoeuvre. However, Rosberg remained convinced that he had done nothing wrong, saying: "I made it very clear I wasn't going to leave any space on the inside and I was very surprised he went for the gap". While Hamilton apologised to the team after the incident, he refused to accept blame for it. Opinions about the incident varied: While Mercedes's executive chairman Niki Lauda blamed Hamilton for the crash, former F1 driver Anthony Davidson said on Sky Sports F1 that Rosberg's move was "very aggressive". Three-time world champion Jackie Stewart said after the race that Mercedes should fine Hamilton for the crash: "Hamilton is to blame. Rosberg was allowed to protect himself. You don't go for it on the first lap." Mercedes's head of motorsport Toto Wolff stressed after the race that the team would continue to let their drivers race against each other freely, a decision praised by former world champion Alain Prost. While Rosberg said after the race that he contemplated having a talk with Hamilton about the situation, Mercedes later decided that they did "not need clear-the-air talks". However, it later emerged that the pair did have a conversation about the incident before the next race in Monaco, which, according to Hamilton, was marked by "pure respect". It was Mercedes's first double retirement since the 2011 Australian Grand Prix, and the first time they failed to score a point since the 2012 United States Grand Prix, ending a 62-race long streak, the third longest in Formula One history.

For his last lap collision with teammate Jolyon Palmer, Kevin Magnussen received a ten-second time penalty, dropping him one place to 15th. He also received two penalty points to his licence. Carlos Sainz received a reprimand from the stewards for leaving the pit lane one minute before it was allowed. He escaped a more severe penalty because he stopped shortly afterwards, thereby not gaining an advantage. Upon his return to Toro Rosso, Daniil Kvyat recorded the first fastest lap of his career, and the first for the Italian team in their 190th Grand Prix.

With 100 points from the first four races, Nico Rosberg remained on top of the Drivers' Championship, while Hamilton's retirement dropped him behind Räikkönen, who now trailed Rosberg by 39 points, four points ahead of Hamilton. Sebastian Vettel and Daniel Ricciardo were level on points with 48, while Verstappen's victory moved him into sixth on 38. In the Constructors' standings, Mercedes retained their lead on 157 points, but Ferrari closed the gap to 48 points, with Red Bull in third on 94. Toro Rosso moved ahead of Haas into fifth, while Force India took seventh from McLaren.

== Classification ==
=== Qualifying ===
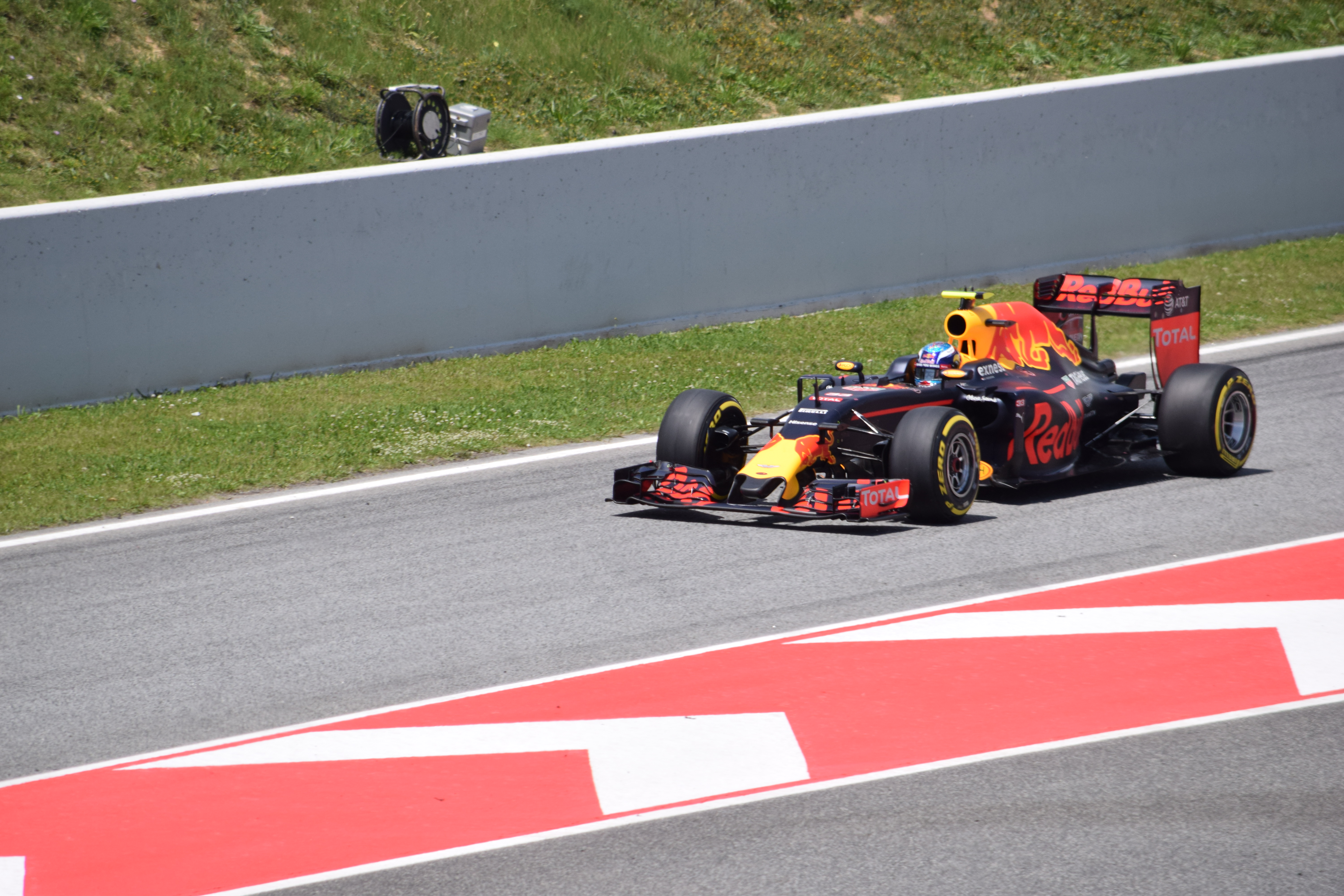
Eventual race winner Max Verstappen during qualifying

Pos.	Car no.	Driver	Constructor	Qualifying times			Final grid
Pos.	Car no.	Driver	Constructor	Q1	Q2	Q3	Final grid
1	44	(United Kingdom) Lewis Hamilton	Mercedes	1:23.214	1:22.159	1:22.000	1
2	6	(Germany) Nico Rosberg	Mercedes	1:23.002	1:22.759	1:22.280	2
3	3	(Australia) Daniel Ricciardo	Red Bull Racing-TAG Heuer	1:23.749	1:23.585	1:22.680	3
4	33	(Netherlands) Max Verstappen	Red Bull Racing-TAG Heuer	1:23.578	1:23.178	1:23.087	4
5	7	(Finland) Kimi Räikkönen	Ferrari	1:23.796	1:23.504	1:23.113	5
6	5	(Germany) Sebastian Vettel	Ferrari	1:24.124	1:23.688	1:23.334	6
7	77	(Finland) Valtteri Bottas	Williams-Mercedes	1:24.251	1:24.023	1:23.522	7
8	55	(Spain) Carlos Sainz Jr.	Toro Rosso-Ferrari	1:24.496	1:24.077	1:23.643	8
9	11	(Mexico) Sergio Pérez	Force India-Mercedes	1:24.698	1:24.003	1:23.782	9
10	14	(Spain) Fernando Alonso	McLaren-Honda	1:24.578	1:24.192	1:23.981	10
11	27	(Germany) Nico Hülkenberg	Force India-Mercedes	1:24.463	1:24.203		11
12	22	(United Kingdom) Jenson Button	McLaren-Honda	1:24.583	1:24.348		12
13	26	(Russia) Daniil Kvyat	Toro Rosso-Ferrari	1:24.696	1:24.445		13
14	8	(France) Romain Grosjean	Haas-Ferrari	1:24.716	1:24.480		14
15	20	(Denmark) Kevin Magnussen	Renault	1:24.669	1:24.625		15
16	21	(Mexico) Esteban Gutiérrez	Haas-Ferrari	1:24.406	1:24.778		16
17	30	(United Kingdom) Jolyon Palmer	Renault	1:24.903			17
18	19	(Brazil) Felipe Massa	Williams-Mercedes	1:24.941			18
19	9	(Sweden) Marcus Ericsson	Sauber-Ferrari	1:25.202			19
20	12	(Brazil) Felipe Nasr	Sauber-Ferrari	1:25.579			20
21	94	(Germany) Pascal Wehrlein	MRT-Mercedes	1:25.745			21
22	88	(Indonesia) Rio Haryanto	MRT-Mercedes	1:25.939			22
107% time: 1:28.812

=== Race ===
Pos.	No.	Driver	Constructor	Laps	Time/Retired	Grid	Pts.
1	33	(Netherlands) Max Verstappen	Red Bull Racing-TAG Heuer	66	1:41:40.017	4	25
2	7	(Finland) Kimi Räikkönen	Ferrari	66	+0.616	5	18
3	5	(Germany) Sebastian Vettel	Ferrari	66	+5.581	6	15
4	3	(Australia) Daniel Ricciardo	Red Bull Racing-TAG Heuer	66	+43.950	3	12
5	77	(Finland) Valtteri Bottas	Williams-Mercedes	66	+45.271	7	10
6	55	(Spain) Carlos Sainz Jr.	Toro Rosso-Ferrari	66	+1:01.395	8	8
7	11	(Mexico) Sergio Pérez	Force India-Mercedes	66	+1:19.538	9	6
8	19	(Brazil) Felipe Massa	Williams-Mercedes	66	+1:20.707	18	4
9	22	(United Kingdom) Jenson Button	McLaren-Honda	65	+1 Lap	12	2
10	26	(Russia) Daniil Kvyat	Toro Rosso-Ferrari	65	+1 Lap	13	1
11	21	(Mexico) Esteban Gutiérrez	Haas-Ferrari	65	+1 Lap	16	
12	9	(Sweden) Marcus Ericsson	Sauber-Ferrari	65	+1 Lap	19	
13	30	(United Kingdom) Jolyon Palmer	Renault	65	+1 Lap	17	
14	12	(Brazil) Felipe Nasr	Sauber-Ferrari	65	+1 Lap	20	
15^{1}	20	(Denmark) Kevin Magnussen	Renault	65	+1 Lap	15	
16	94	(Germany) Pascal Wehrlein	MRT-Mercedes	65	+1 Lap	21	
17	88	(Indonesia) Rio Haryanto	MRT-Mercedes	65	+1 Lap	22	
Ret	8	(France) Romain Grosjean	Haas-Ferrari	56	Brakes	14	
Ret	14	(Spain) Fernando Alonso	McLaren-Honda	45	Power unit	10	
Ret	27	(Germany) Nico Hülkenberg	Force India-Mercedes	20	Oil leak	11	
Ret	44	(United Kingdom) Lewis Hamilton	Mercedes	0	Collision	1	
Ret	6	(Germany) Nico Rosberg	Mercedes	0	Collision	2	

Notes

- ^1 – Kevin Magnussen originally finished 14th but received a ten-second time penalty after the race for causing a collision with Jolyon Palmer.

== Championship standings after the race ==
Drivers' Championship standings

	Pos.	Driver	Points
	1	(Germany) Nico Rosberg	100
1	2	(Finland) Kimi Räikkönen	61
1	3	(United Kingdom) Lewis Hamilton	57
1	4	(Germany) Sebastian Vettel	48
1	5	(Australia) Daniel Ricciardo	48

Constructors' Championship standings

	Pos.	Constructor	Points
	1	(Germany) Mercedes	157
	2	(Italy) Ferrari	109
	3	(Austria) Red Bull Racing-TAG Heuer	94
	4	(United Kingdom) Williams-Mercedes	65
1	5	(Italy) Toro Rosso-Ferrari	26
Sources:

- Note: Only the top five positions are included for both sets of standings.

== See also ==
- 2016 Catalunya GP2 Series round
- 2016 Catalunya GP3 Series round

Previous race: 2016 Russian Grand Prix	FIA Formula One World Championship; 2016 season	Next race: 2016 Monaco Grand Prix
Previous race: 2015 Spanish Grand Prix	Spanish Grand Prix	Next race: 2017 Spanish Grand Prix
