= Simon Lazenby =

British journalist

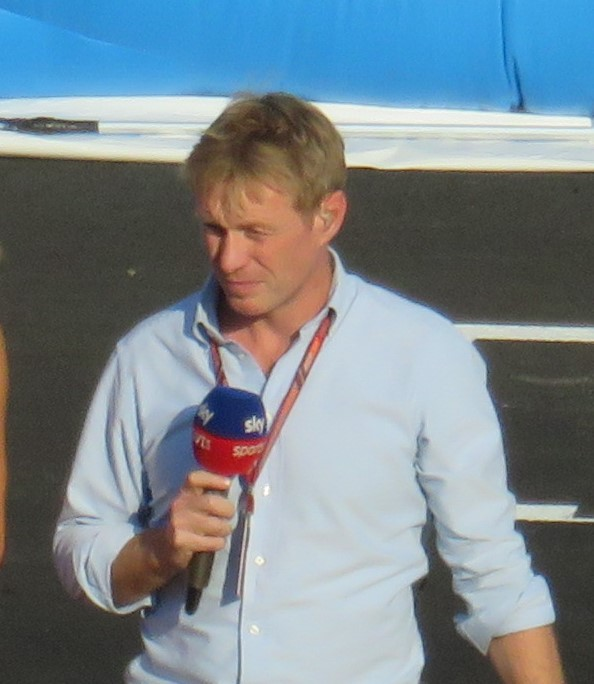
- Lazenby in 2018
- Born: Simon James Lazenby; 21 March 1975 (age 51)
- Citizenship: British & Canadian (birthplace)
- Education: Royal Grammar School, Guildford
- Alma mater: Durham University
- Occupation: Television presenter
- Years active: 2002–present
- Employer: Sky Sports (2002–present)
- Known for: Formula 1 Presenter

Simon James Lazenby (born 21 March 1975) is a TV presenter and lead presenter of Formula One for Sky Sports.

== Career ==
Lazenby graduated from Durham University with a degree in Natural Sciences. At university he played as a scrum-half for the rugby club and also captained his college team, St. Hild and St. Bede. After working initially as a grain trader for a private firm in Lincolnshire, he obtained work experience at Sky through fellow Durham alumnus Mark Durden-Smith, eventually passing a screen test after some months as a runner. He began presenting for Sky Sports in 2002, where he was part of the coverage of live Rugby Union.

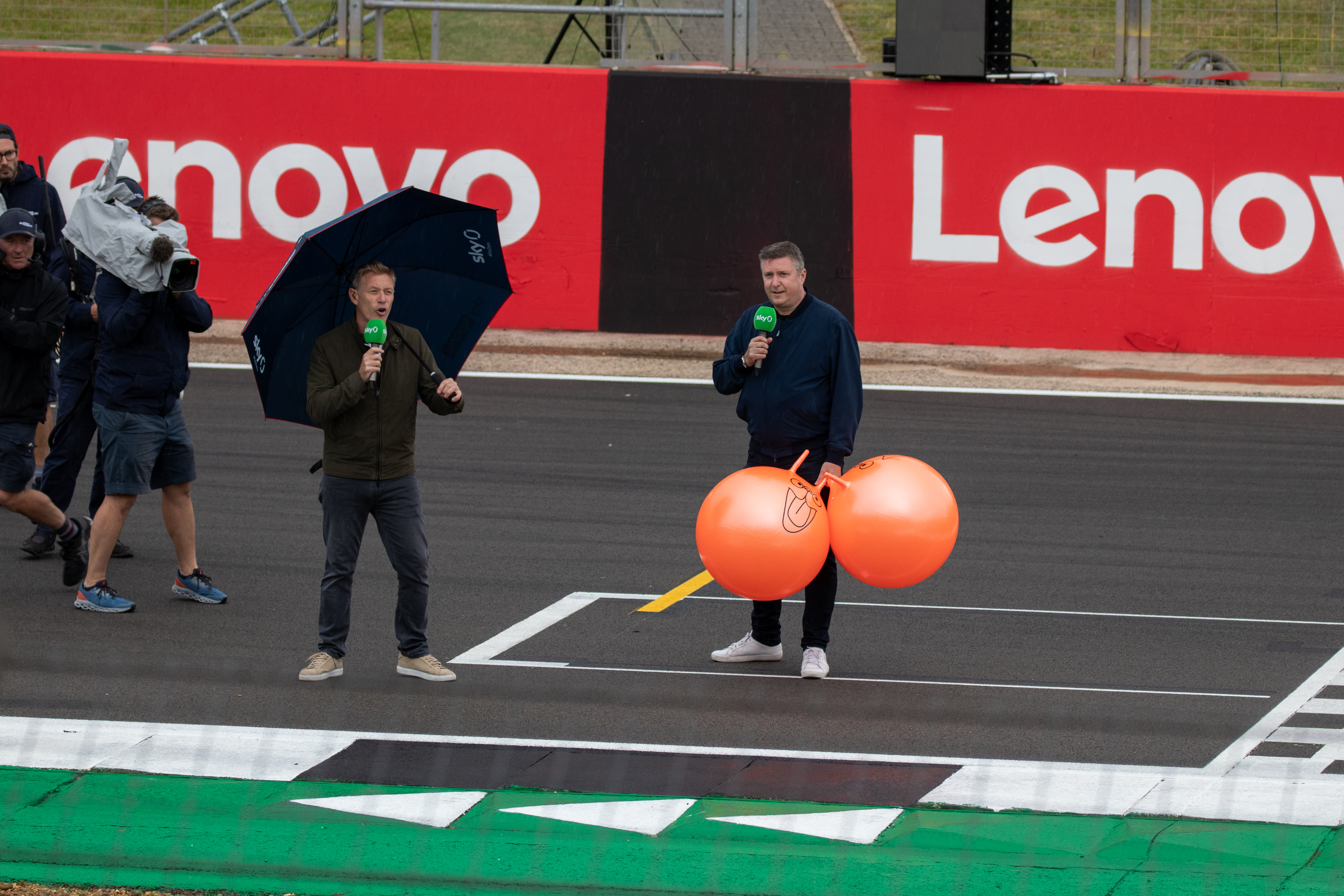
Lazenby (left) with David Croft at the 2022 British Grand Prix

Lazenby has been the lead presenter of Sky Sports F1 coverage since the channel's inception in 2012 alongside Johnny Herbert, David Croft, Martin Brundle, Damon Hill, Ted Kravitz, Jenson Button, Karun Chandhok, Anthony Davidson, Paul di Resta, Naomi Schiff and Nico Rosberg. Lazenby has not presented at two Grands Prix in 2020 - Natalie Pinkham was lead presenter for the 2020 Spanish Grand Prix and Rachel Brookes for the 2020 Russian Grand Prix. The channel has twice won International Broadcaster of the year since its inception in 2012. As of 2019, Lazenby has presented the live coverage of over 160 Grands Prix.

In 2025 Lazenby produced the Sky documentary film Hill, telling the story of the 1996 Formula One world champion Damon Hill. By June 2025, Lazenby announced he will publish his first book, Pressure, in the latter half of the 2025 Formula One season.

== Personal life ==
Lazenby has a wife and two children, and lives in Wimbledon in South West London. He plays golf and the piano.
