= Sky Sports F1 =

British television channel

- Logo used since 2025
- Country: United Kingdom

Programming
- Picture format: 2160p UHDTV (downscaled to 1080i and 16:9 576i for the HDTV and SDTV feeds, respectively. HDR-TV on certain Sky models.)

Ownership
- Owner: Sky Group (Comcast)

History
- Launched: 9 March 2012; 14 years ago
- Replaced: Sky Living Loves

Links
- Website: skysports.com/f1

Availability

Streaming media
- Sky Go: Watch live (UK and Ireland only)
- Now: Watch live (UK and Ireland only)

Sky Sports F1 is a British pay television sports channel owned by Sky Group. Part of the Sky Sports networks, it primarily broadcasts coverage of the Formula One championship, including live coverage of all practices, qualifying sessions, and races, as well as studio programmes and archive content. The channel also carries coverage of other open-wheel motorsports competitions outside of F1, including the Formula 2 championship and the United States' IndyCar Series.

The channel was established in 2012 as part of Sky's acquisition of rights to Formula One in the UK and Ireland, a contract that has since been renewed through to 2034. Sky's F1 coverage has also been syndicated to broadcasters in Canada and the United States. Since Sky's acquisition of the rights, a free-to-air package of highlights and selected live races have also been sub-licensed to a free-to-air network, currently Channel 4.

At the end of Free Practice 1 at the 2026 United States Grand Prix at COTA, the commentary team spoke to Pierre Gasly live from the commentary box whilst he was doing a practice start, a first for Sky Sports F1.

== Background ==
The BBC had exclusive UK F1 rights from 2009 until the end of the 2013 season, having regained the rights from ITV. However, a new broadcast rights deal was announced on 29 July 2011, stating that Sky Sports would cover all races live. The BBC continued to broadcast half of the races live including the British Grand Prix and final race. It also allowed the BBC to show highlights of all races. In November 2011, Sky announced the new dedicated F1 channel would launch in March 2012, and will air all F1 races with coverage of practice sessions, qualifying and the race, live and commercial-free.

On 21 December 2015, it was announced that the BBC would be ending its television broadcast rights three seasons early after the 2015 season with its rights to 10 live races and highlights of all 21 races going to Channel 4. However, BBC Radio 5 Live and BBC Radio 5 Live Sports Extra would continue to broadcast live commentary of the whole season until the 2021 season.

Prior to the launch of the channel, there was some controversy about switching Formula One coverage at least in part to pay television.

== Launch ==
The channel launched on 9 March 2012, seven days before the start of the 2012 Formula One season. During 2012, the channel was on air for sixty-three hours during race weeks and thirty-two hours during non-race weeks. Sky Sports F1 announced via Twitter that there would not be a dedicated Sky Sports F1 app, however the F1 section on the Sky Sports News app was enhanced.

Sky Sports F1 launched with a two-hour special of The F1 Show, presented by Simon Lazenby, Martin Brundle and Damon Hill, previewing the 2012 Formula One season.

== Availability ==
Sky Sports F1 HD on the Sky platform was available to new and existing customers before 1 April 2013 providing they subscribed to the HD pack. Existing subscribers to all of the Sky Sports channels without the HD pack received a standard definition version. Virgin Media and Smallworld Cable offer the standard definition version of the channel to Sky Sports subscribers, it is not available separately. The HD version of the channel was made available to Virgin Media customers subscribing to the Sky Sports Collection with the additional Sky Sports HD pack on 15 July 2014. A standard definition version of the channel is also provided through Sky Go.

Since 18 July 2017, new Sky TV customers are able to purchase the channel as a standalone channel, or as part of a larger Sky Sports package.

Since 2017, Sky Sports F1 has broadcast Formula 1 in 4K UHD.

=== International syndication ===
Beginning in the 2016 season, Canadian F1 rights holder TSN began to simulcast Sky's coverage, including the pre- and post-race programmes and in-race commentary.

From 2018 to 2025, Formula One's US rights holder ESPN similarly began using Sky Sports F1's commentary, along with a simulcast of the pre-race show and some of the post-race show if necessary. At least four races were also televised on free-to-air sister network ABC, including Monaco. After criticism over its handling and timing of adverts during the 2018 Australian Grand Prix (at times cutting off commentators mid-sentence), ESPN announced that it would air races with no commercial interruptions and a single presenting sponsor (American car care brand Mothers). For the 2019 Formula One season, Welcome to the Weekend and Pit Lane Live also became available on the digital subscription service ESPN+.

The light-touch Sky simulcast on ESPN and ABC has been credited with an increase of ratings and acclaim for the series in the United States, improved domestic sponsorship sales for pre- and post-race programming, and an increase in virtual advertising (overlaid by FOM as part of the multilateral world feed) on some trackside hoardings during the race weekend.

== Coverage ==
=== Formula One ===
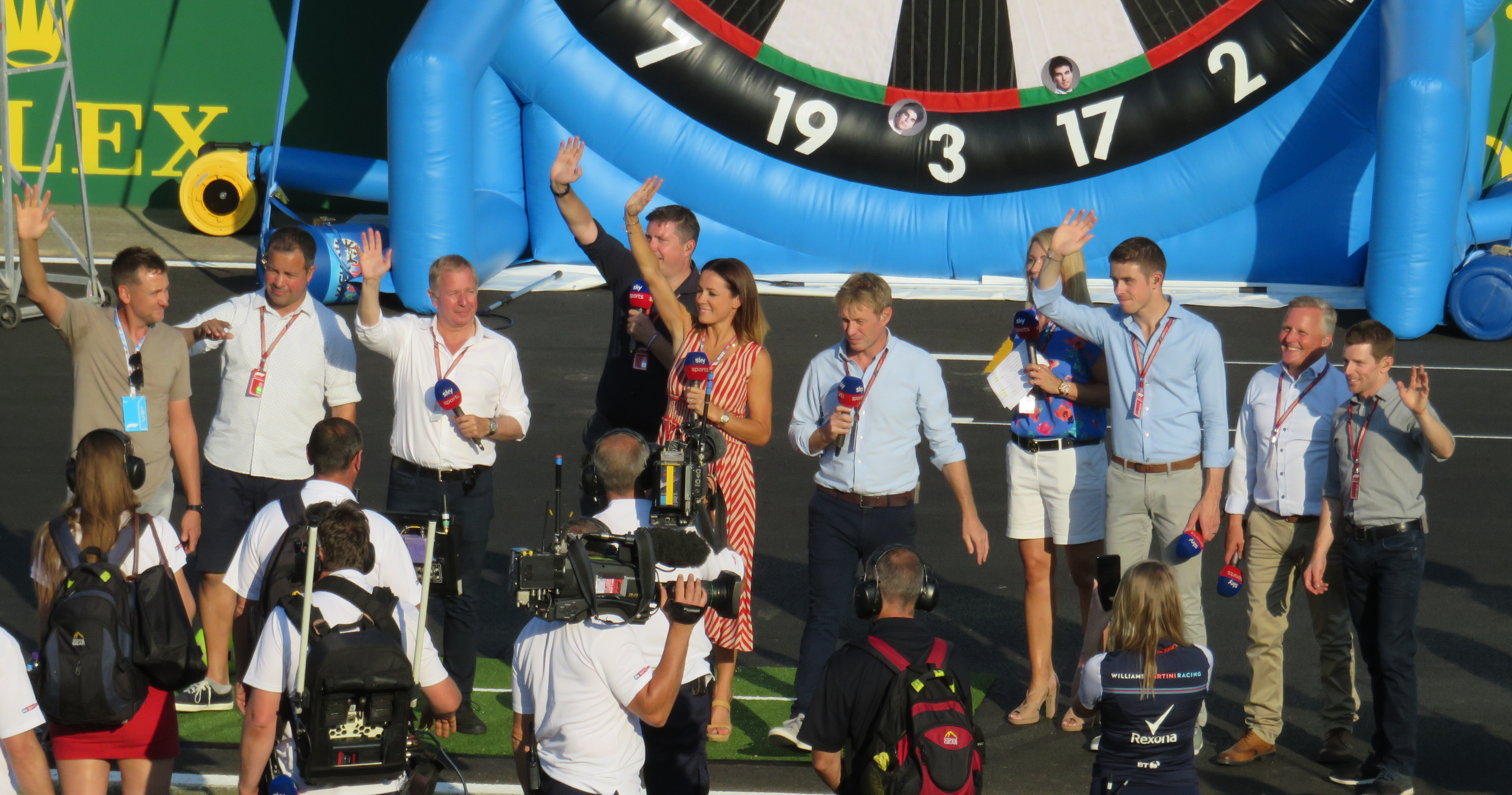
Sky Sports F1 presenters at the 2018 British Grand Prix

The 2012 season started on 16 March (live practice) from the Melbourne Grand Prix Circuit, Australia. Sky Sports broadcast every practice session, qualifying session and race live. The season passed 19 countries on the way. Formula One visited places as diverse as China, Bahrain, Belgium, Italy, and also United States for a Grand Prix taking place in Austin, Texas at the brand new Circuit of the Americas. The season came to an end at the 2012 Brazilian Grand Prix on 25 November 2012.

On 7 March 2012, Sky Sports F1 revealed its theme tune for the 2012 season, "Just Drive" by Alistair Griffin, which has been re-recorded with the Prague Philharmonic Orchestra and Rodolfus Choir. The 43-second opening credits feature archive footage of former world champions and memorable F1 moments from 32 Grands Prix between 1950 and 2011. The theme tune was also used on The F1 Show and for Classic F1. 2014 saw a rearrangement of the theme to go with updated titles. Sky's original arrangement is still of Griffins' song utilised for its coverage of Classic F1 races. From the 2019 season onwards "Just Drive" was replaced by Outlands by Daft Punk, which had previously been featured in the film Tron: Legacy (2010). This theme would be retained by Sky F1 as its main theme during race coverage until the end of the 2025 season. For the 2026 season, after seven seasons of use by Sky F1, Outlands was replaced as the title track for Sky F1's coverage by Just Keep Watching by Tate McRae , a song featured on the pop music soundtrack for the film F1 (2025).

During the 2012 season, Santander UK was the official sponsor of Formula One coverage on Sky Sports F1 in a deal that was estimated to be worth £3 million. The coverage was sponsored by Shell in 2014. From the 2015 Malaysian Grand Prix, FairFX sponsored coverage on Sky Sports F1. For the 2025 season Sky Sport's F1's coverage would be sponsored by German carmaker Audi.

The season opening 2012 Australian Grand Prix, the first to be broadcast exclusively by Sky, had an average audience of 526,000 viewers between 4:30 am and 9 am on 18 March, with a five-minute peak of 1.02 million as Jenson Button won the race. The BBC's live coverage of the same race last season averaged 2.13 million viewers, a 51.1% share of the audience.

Sky Sports won "Best TV Broadcast Award for Outstanding Coverage" at both the 2012 FIA Prize Giving Ceremony (following Sky Sports F1's debut season presenting Formula One) and again in 2013.

From 2019, Sky Sports held exclusive rights to all races excluding the British Grand Prix. In September 2018, it was announced that Channel 4 had agreed to a sub-licensing agreement with Sky, under which it would broadcast free-to-air highlights of all races, and live coverage of the British Grand Prix. As a condition of the deal, Channel 4 agreed to give Sky the right to carry full series of its drama programming (including its curated foreign dramas collection Walter Presents) on its on-demand platforms. In the 2021 season, Sky also sublicensed the season-ending Abu Dhabi Grand Prix, amid Lewis Hamilton and Max Verstappen being tied on points for the drivers' championship going into the final race.

==== Presentation and commentary team ====
The presentation team currently (as of March 2026) consists of:

Name	Appearances	Job
Simon Lazenby	Most races	Host and presenter of most live build-ups, post-race analysis and the opening practice session. Previously worked as a presenter on Sky Sports' Rugby Union coverage.
David Croft	All races (2012–23) Most races (2024–present)	Main commentator on most practice sessions, qualifying and races and the host of #AskCrofty. He previously covered F1 on BBC Radio 5 Live from 2006 to 2011. He also contributes to The F1 Show.
Karun Chandhok	Most races	Former HRT, Lotus F1 driver throughout 2010–2011. Initially worked for Sky Sports F1 from 2012 to 2014 before leaving to join Channel 4 before returning to Sky Sports F1 from 2019. Analysis at selected races and sessions and pitlane reporter. One of the secondary co-commentators for qualifying and the race if Brundle is absent.
Natalie Pinkham	Most races	Initially only the driver interviewer (a role she previously held on BBC Radio 5 Live in 2011), sometimes host of The F1 Show and previously the final practice session on Saturdays. Conducts driver parade interviews at selected races. Also commentates on select F1 sessions and is the main presenter when Lazenby is absent.
Rachel Brookes	Most races	Sky Sports News reporter who previously interviewed the drivers for Paddock Uncut on Thursdays and provides F1 news reports. She takes turns to co-host The F1 Show, F1 Report and the final practice session on Saturdays. Conducts driver parade interviews at selected races.
Craig Slater	Selected races	Sky Sports News reporter who previously interviewed the drivers for Paddock Uncut on Thursdays and currently provides F1 news reports.
Martin Brundle	Most races	Former F1 driver and tester who has also had a successful career in sportscar racing winning the World Sportscar Championship in 1988 and scoring an overall victory in the 1990 24 Hours of Le Mans. Co-commentator for qualifying and race day for the majority of races, Brundle also provides analysis and reporting of practice, qualifying and races, in addition to the pre-race grid-walk. He previously covered F1 on ITV between 1997 and 2008 and on the BBC from 2009 to 2011.
Jamie Chadwick	Selected races	Three time W Series champion and 2024 Indy NXT driver . Chadwick will also race in the European Le Mans series during 2025.
Anthony Davidson	Selected races	Former F1 driver for Super Aguri, BAR and Minardi. Also ex-test driver for the Honda and Mercedes F1 teams. Recently retired sports car driver and 2014 World Endurance Champion after a previous stint with Peugeot and Toyota. Co-commentator during practice sessions and analyst for selected race events.
Nico Rosberg	Selected races	2016 Drivers World Champion and multiple race winner. Drove for Williams and Mercedes between 2006 and 2016 before announcing an early retirement. Provides analysis on a selection of races throughout the year and was a co-commentator on one race in 2021. Also works for RTL in Germany and Sky Italia's F1 coverage.
Jenson Button	Selected races	2009 Drivers World Champion. He drove for Williams, Benetton, Renault, BAR, Honda, Brawn GP and McLaren between 2000 and 2016. Provides analysis on a selection of races and sessions throughout the year starting with the 2018 British Grand Prix and is one of the secondary co-commentators for qualifying and the race if Brundle is absent. As of 2025 Button also races in the FIA World Endurance Championship and has formerly raced in Super GT.
Ted Kravitz	Most races	Pit-lane reporter, who previously hosted the second free practice session. Host of the regular Ted's Notebook. Kravitz provides news, analysis and technical information from his position in the pit-lane. He previously covered F1 on ITV from 2002 to 2008 and on the BBC from 2009 to 2011.
Naomi Schiff	Selected races	Former W Series driver, drove for Hitech GP in 2019. Provides analysis on a selection of races and sessions starting in 2022. Also, host of Any Driven Monday.
Bernie Collins	Most races	Former Aston Martin F1 team strategy engineer who provides analysis of selected races and sessions starting in 2023.
Harry Benjamin	Selected races	Relief main commentator for qualifying sessions and races on occasions where David Croft is absent. When Croft is not absent Benjamin works as the main commentator for F1 coverage on BBC Radio 5 Live and its sister stations.
Jacques Villeneuve	Selected races	Former F1 driver. 1997 Drivers World Champion. First appeared as an analyst at the 2024 Canadian Grand Prix.

During testing, commentary is normally shared between Sky Sports and Channel 4/F1TV, with main commentator Alex Jacques and co-commentators Alex Brundle and Jolyon Palmer, with strategy analyst Ruth Buscombe, pit lane reporters Ariana Bravo and Lawrence Barretto.

=== Support races ===
In February 2012, it was announced that Sky Sports F1 would also broadcast the GP2 and GP3 series live. These series were eventually rebranded as the FIA Formula 2 Championship and the FIA Formula 3 Championship respectively

- Formula 2 – Formula 1's feeder series
- Formula 3 – Feeder series for Formula 2
- F1 Academy
- Porsche Supercup

Sky Sports takes the FOM-provided world feed commentary for Formula 2 and Formula 3. Commentators include Chris McCarthy and Alex Brundle Previously, Jacques has been joined by 2012 GP2 champion Davide Valsecchi for F2 events. Johnny Herbert, Rosanna Tennant and Alice Powell have also previously reported or commentated on Formula 2 and Formula 3.

=== Other racing series broadcast on Sky Sports F1 ===
==== IndyCar ====
Sky Sports F1 aired the opening round of the 2012 IndyCar Series. The IndyCar Series moved to BT Sport in 2013, but returned to Sky Sports F1 in 2019 under a new contract by Sky's new owner Comcast, which held the U.S. domestic rights to the series via NBC Sports until 2024. Sky Sports F1 has shown live every race in the IndyCar calendar since 2019, with a combination of original American broadcast commentary and additional UK-based commentary. IndyCar coverage continued on Sky Sports F1 for 2025, including the IndyNXT support series.

==== Ferrari Challenge Europe ====
Ferrari's various series under the Challenge brand have been aired by the UK Sky Sports F1 channel since 2020.

==== GT World Challenge ====
Some rounds of the Fanatec GT World Challenge Europe series are aired on the channel, as part of a pan-European expanded agreement with Comcast/Sky Sports, in place since 2022.

=== Programming ===
==== The F1 Show ====
The first programme to air on Sky Sports F1 was its weekly magazine show; The F1 Show. Initially presented by Georgie Thompson and Ted Kravitz (apart from the launch show, which was presented by Simon Lazenby), then by Kravitz and Natalie Pinkham, as of the 2014 season, it is presented by Natalie Pinkham or Rachel Brookes with contributions from David Croft, Paul di Resta/Anthony Davidson, Johnny Herbert/Damon Hill. The programme has not featured in the 2020 schedule.

The F1 Show returned for the 2021 season, replacing F1 Report, broadcast live on Sky Sports F1 and YouTube. It is presented by members of the coverage team at the track, usually fronted by Natalie Pinkham or Rachel Brookes. It features interviews with drivers, analysis and challenges. In 2021, it was broadcast on Thursday evening but moved to Friday evening after Formula 1 rescheduled its weekend layout.

==== Paddock Uncut ====
A Thursday evening pre-race weekend round-up from media day broadcast on Sky Sports F1 and YouTube. It is presented by members of the coverage team at the track, usually fronted by Ted Kravitz or Rachel Brookes.

==== F1 Report (discontinued) ====
The F1 Report was presented by Natalie Pinkham or Rachel Brookes and regular analyst Marc Priestley. In the week before or after a race, the programme looked in further depth at some of the stories and incidents that featured or may feature in race weekends. The show was replaced by Welcome to the Weekend, a Thursday race weekend show with a similar format, no longer featuring Marc Priestley.

==== Welcome to the Weekend (discontinued) ====
Welcome to the Weekend, from the start of the 2020 season, was broadcast directly before the First Practice session on Fridays. The programme did not feature in the 2021 schedule, replaced by a relaunched The F1 Show and Paddock Uncut, as well as an extended build-up to first practice.

==== Classic F1 ====
Coverage of an F1 race from the archive, often corresponding to the current race that weekend.

- Ted's Notebook

A topical show presented by Ted Kravitz. It was retitled The Notebook for 2020 and followed the race programme on Sunday only. Since 2021, it has followed most qualifying, sprint and race programmes, and is sometimes referred to as Ted's Notebook on the EPG and when uploaded onto YouTube in the evening after being aired.

=== Features ===
Sky Sports have a system dubbed the 'Sky Pad', used primarily by Anthony Davidson, Karun Chandhok and Ted Kravitz during race weekend coverage. It is used to show highlights, multiple angles or comparison footage, allowing a presenter to control the playback speed and add overlaid graphics to explain key moments in greater detail.

=== Sky Sports Darts pop-up ===
In 2016 and 2025, Sky Sports F1 was temporarily rebranded as the pop-up channel "Sky Sports Darts", for Sky's coverage of the PDC World Darts Championship.

=== The F1 Show Podcast ===
Series	Date	Host	Experts	Guests	Location	Platforms	Ref
2	15 October 2024	Matt Baker	Jenson Button	—N/a	Videocall	YouTube; Spotify; Amazon Music	
2	22 October 2024	Matt Baker	Ted Kravitz; Tom McCluskey	—N/a	Videocall	YouTube; Spotify; Amazon Music	
2	29 October 2024	Matt Baker	Damon Hill; Nigel Chiu	—N/a	Videocall	YouTube; Spotify; Amazon Music	
2	5 November 2024	Matt Baker	Karun Chandhok; Bernie Collins	—N/a	Videocall	YouTube; Spotify; Amazon Music	
2	12 November 2024	Matt Baker	Martin Brundle	—N/a	Sky Studios, Osterley	YouTube; Spotify; Amazon Music	
2	19 November 2024	Matt Baker	David Croft; Tom Bellingham	—N/a	Videocall	YouTube; Spotify; Amazon Music	
2	26 November 2024	Matt Baker	Jenson Button	—N/a	Videocall	YouTube; Spotify; Amazon Music	
2	3 December 2024	Matt Baker	Karun Chandhok; Naomi Schiff	—N/a	Videocall	YouTube; Spotify; Amazon Music	
2	10 December 2024	Matt Baker	Nico Rosberg; Tom McCluskey	—N/a	Videocall	YouTube; Spotify; Amazon Music	
2	17 December 2024	Matt Baker	Karun Chandhok; Ted Kravitz	Will Joseph; Tom Stallard; Randy Singh	McLaren Technology Centre, Woking	YouTube; Spotify; Amazon Music	
3	25 February 2025	Simon Lazenby	Bernie Collins; Ted Kravitz	—N/a	Sky Studios, Osterley	YouTube; Spotify; Amazon Music	

== Sky Sports News ==
During the Formula One season, Sky Sports News has two pit-lane reporters; Rachel Brookes and Craig Slater. They provide exclusive content to Sky Sports News viewers on the latest Formula One news. Brookes' role has increased to include presenting some editions of The F1 Show, an alternate driver interviewer (in addition to Natalie Pinkham), and lead presenter for the Russian Grand Prix 2020.

== Sky Race Control ==
Sky Race Control is the brand name used across all of Sky Sports F1's interactive services. Sky Race Control is available via the red button as well as the Sky Sports website and iPad app in conjunction with a Sky ID. Features include the race coverage, official Formula One timing showing times of all 22 drivers in every session and curated onboard feeds alternating between various drivers. The Sky Race Control application/web service for PC (requiring Microsoft Silverlight) was discontinued in 2015, but continues on the TV and the Sky Sports F1 iPad application.

== Criticisms, controversies and errors ==
It was reported that, on 18 March 2012, BSkyB chief executive Jeremy Darroch ordered a news story on a plan to sell a stake of F1's parent company and shake-up commercial deals published the previous day to be removed from the Sky News website, subject to a review. It was alleged that the move came after Sky Sports F1 executive producer Martin Turner complained that it had upset seven of the twelve Formula One teams ahead of the Australian Grand Prix. The story was republished the following day substantially unchanged except for the replacement of some sections quoting directly from confidential documents. Jeremy Darroch said that "the issue was about process" and that Sky's sports team at the grand prix were not "properly briefed" ahead of publication. When questioned whether the request for a review represented a commercial interference in Sky News's editorial independence, Darroch said Sky needed to have "proper rigour in terms of our processes in our business".

At the 2022 Mexico City Grand Prix, it was reported that Max Verstappen and Red Bull would boycott interviews from Sky Sports F1, following comments made by presenter Ted Kravitz, claiming Lewis Hamilton was "robbed" of the 2021 Formula One World Drivers' Championship after mistakenly proclaiming him an "eight-time World Champion". Christian Horner described his comments as “the straw that broke the camel’s back”. Red Bull ended their boycott of Sky Sports F1 ahead of the 2022 São Paulo Grand Prix.

On 20 September 2024, ahead of the first practice session for the 2024 Singapore Grand Prix, a pre-recorded segment of Kravitz analysing the Ferrari SF-24 was accidentally aired uncensored, despite Kravitz uttering an expletive during the segment in frustration at his own performance. Both Simon Lazenby and Kravitz apologised to viewers for any offence caused, saying the wrong recording of the segment had been aired.

Following the 2025 Chinese Grand Prix, Kravitz made a joke regarding George Russell's inability to pass Lando Norris (who was suffering from brake problems) for second place in the closing stages of that Grand Prix, in front of staff from Russell's Mercedes team. Kravitz immediately apologised for the joke.

Towards the end of the second practice session for 2025 Saudi Arabian Grand Prix, David Croft was forced to apologise by Sky's editorial/production team, after co-commentator Karun Chandhok was deemed to have been blasphemous live on air whilst responding to comments made by Croft.

== See also ==
- Speed Channel (defunct channel)
