= Mount Lourdes Grammar School =

Coordinates: 54.344°N 7.633°W

Location
- Belmore Street; Enniskillen, BT74 6AB; Northern Ireland

Information
- Type: Grammar School
- Religious affiliation: Roman Catholic
- Established: 1909
- Local authority: Education Authority
- Principal: Sinead Cullen
- Age: 11 to 18
- Enrolment: 751
- Colour
- Website: http://www.mountlourdes.com/

Mount Lourdes Grammar School is a Roman Catholic girls' grammar school in Enniskillen, County Fermanagh, Northern Ireland. The school educates Catholic girls from County Fermanagh and surrounding areas. The school is located within the parish of Enniskillen, one of the largest parishes in the Diocese of Clogher.

== History ==
Mount Lourdes Grammar School was established in 1909 by the Sisters of Mercy as the Convent Intermediate school. This was in response to a need to offer secondary school education to Catholic girls in County Fermanagh. The school was accommodated in one room in the Convent building and in its first year had only 7 pupils.

In 1917 the demand for places at Mount Lourdes as well as the lack of transport in Fermanagh led to the provision of boarding facilities. At first the borders lived in the Convent but Sacred Heart House was opened in 1931. By 1931 enrolment reached 77. By 1947 the 1947 Education Act made free secondary education for all, and by 1968 there was 551 pupils at Mount Lourdes. Boarding became less and less popular and it ended in 1978.

In 2001, a major scheme of extension began resulting in a new building that accommodated new art, home economics and music rooms along with a new assembly hall and a sports hall. The school is located on Belmore Street in Enniskillen.

== Academics ==
In 2018 it was ranked joint 15th in Northern Ireland for its GCSE performance with 99% of its entrants receiving five or more GCSEs at grades A* to C, including the core subjects English and Maths.

78.7% of its students who sat the A-level exams in 2017/18 were awarded three A*-C grades.

== Staff ==
- In 2021, Maureen McKeever, former Principal, was awarded an Honorary MBE for services to education.

== Former students ==
- Bernadette Collins (born 1986) - Strategy engineer
