= Bernadette Collins =

Formula 1 strategy engineer and TV presenter

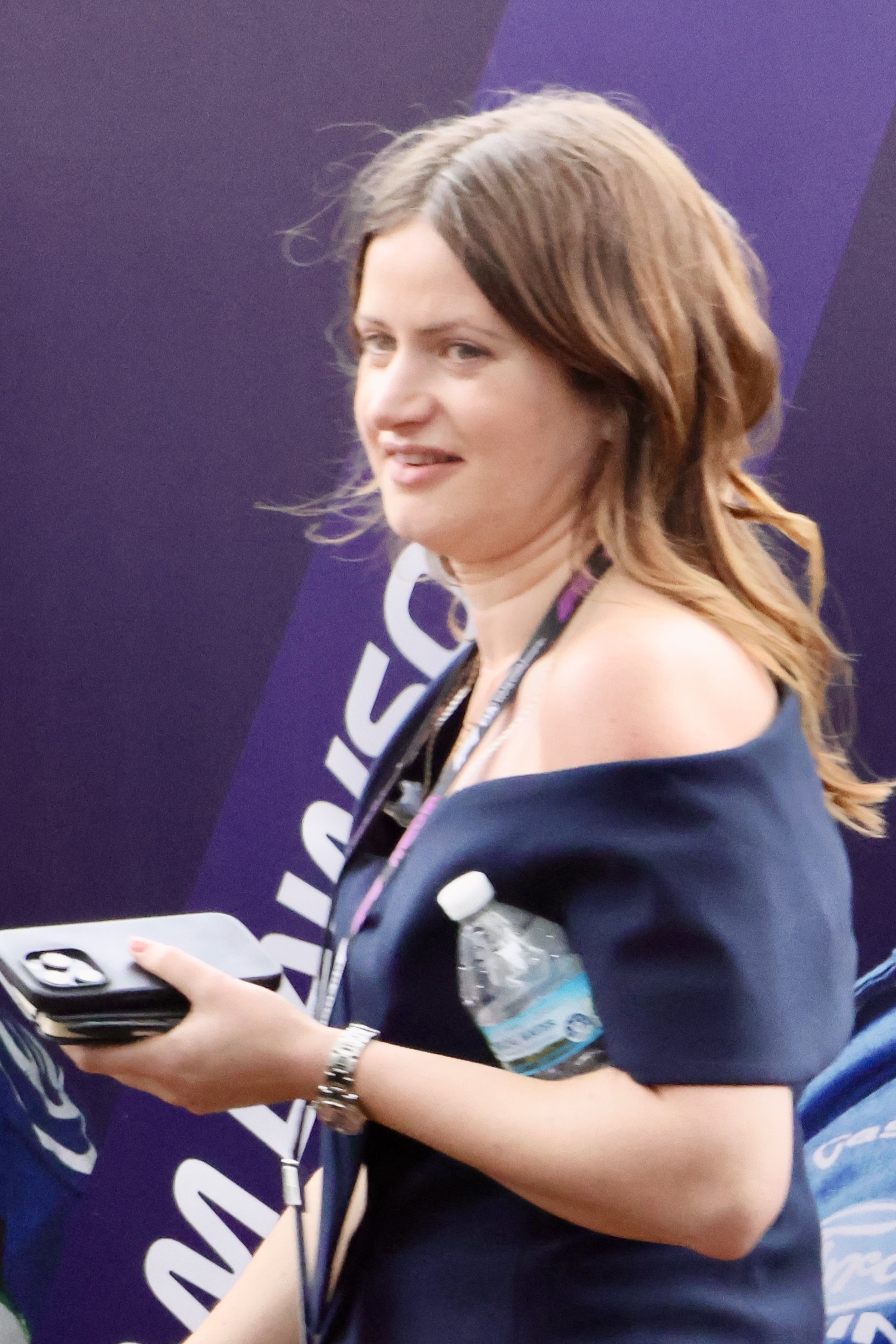
- Collins in 2026
- Born: 1986-1987 (age 39–40); Maguiresbridge, Northern Ireland
- Education: Queen's University Belfast
- Occupations: Strategy engineer, Television presenter
- Years active: 2009 – present
- Employer: Sky Sports F1

Bernadette Collins is a Northern Irish engineer who is the Formula One strategy analyst for Sky Sports and F1TV and former F1 strategy engineer.

Born in Northern Ireland, she began her career as a trainee with McLaren after graduating from Queen's University Belfast in 2009 eventually becoming a performance engineer and became the leader in that role full-time in 2014, working with 2009 World Champion Jenson Button. She joined Force India in 2015 as a performance and strategy engineer to Nico Hülkenberg and later Sergio Pérez. She would remain with the team in the same role as it became Racing Point following its purchase by Lawrence Stroll in 2018 and its later rebrand to Aston Martin in 2021. She would leave the team at the end of the 2021 F1 season, becoming a pundit and race strategy analyst for Sky Sports and F1TV's F1 coverage.

Collins was an ambassador for the United Kingdom government's "Make it in Great Britain" campaign in 2012, and featured on Forbes 2016 list of 30 Under 30 list for Manufacturing & Industry in Europe.

== Biography ==
=== Early life and education ===
Collins was born around 1986/1987. She is from the village of Maguiresbridge in County Fermanagh, Northern Ireland, and attended Tattygar Primary School outside Enniskillen. Collins's father works in a garage but not as a mechanic. She described herself as a partial "tom-boy" because she built and dismantled farmyard machinery with her father. Although she did not intend to be employed within motor racing, Collins was undecided on her future career during a period of five years at the all-girls Roman Catholic Mount Lourdes Grammar School. Eventually, she chose to enrol on a mechanical engineering course at the Queen's University Belfast because she liked mathematics and physics. Collins was one of three female students in a class of 30. Her interest in motor racing emerged in her final two years at university when she was part of the annual Formula Student programme that is organised by the Institution of Mechanical Engineers where universities design, test, construct, and drive small-scale formula style racing cars.

=== Career ===
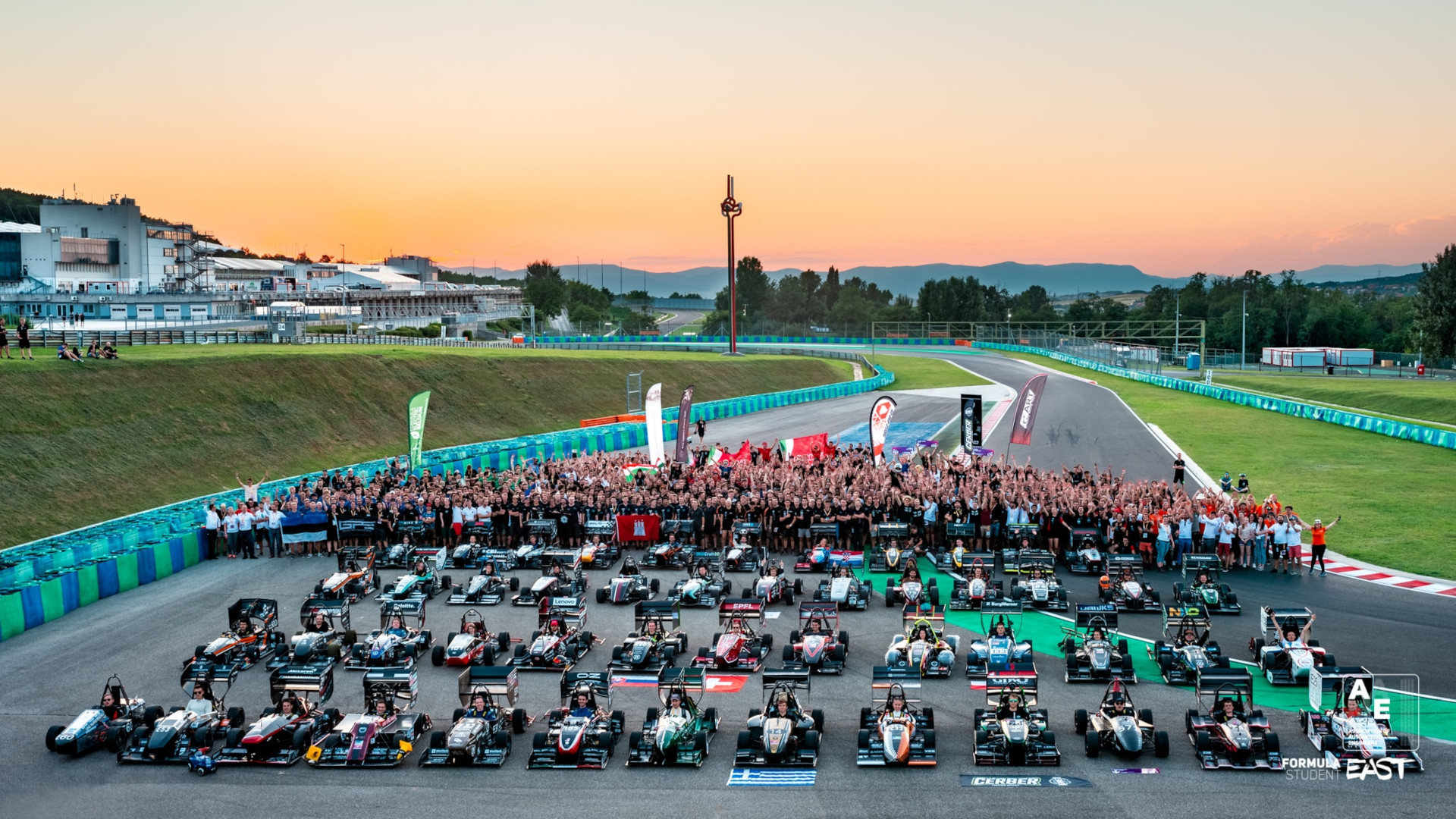
Formula Student Programme in 2021

Following her completion of the Formula Student programme, but before she graduated in 2009, Collins applied for a graduate trainee programme with the McLaren Formula One racing team after seeing it advertised through the university's mechanical engineering department. She was initially skeptical about securing the traineeship but took advantage of an opportunity to visit the McLaren Technology Centre. Then, after completing a series of online assessments and tests, Collins secured a place on the programme in 2009. Her position entailed her rotating departments every three months to gain knowledge on each role and inter-team requirements. During her graduate year, Collins transferred into McLaren's design department and worked primarily on the transmissions of their vehicles. She also volunteered as an engineer at GP3 Series race weekends in order to broaden her experience.

Collins received an offer to work part-time for the McLaren GT sports car racing team and undertook support for its factory operation to manage its greenhouse gas emissions, an area in which she desired to work. In 2012, she was promoted to the role of a performance engineer, making her first trackside appearance at that season's German Grand Prix. That June, Collins was named as the United Kingdom government's Make it in Great Britain's 30 Under 30 list and she consequently became an ambassador for the campaign. She worked as a race engineer for the United Autosports GT team in 2013. When McLaren's primary performance engineer was absent on paternity leave in late 2013, Collins was temporarily assigned to the position for the Indian and Abu Dhabi Grands Prix and was later handed the job full-time for the 2014 season. She worked with 2009 World Champion Jenson Button and the two had a good working relationship.

In May 2015, Collins left McLaren to join Force India as a performance and senior strategy engineer to driver Nico Hülkenberg as part of her objective of becoming an operations engineer. That season, she helped the team claim a podium with Sergio Pérez at the 2015 Russian Grand Prix, a fourth-place finish in the Constructors' Championship in 2016 and Pérez's maiden victory at the 2020 Sakhir Grand Prix. Collins was featured by Forbes in their 30 Under 30 list for Manufacturing & Industry in Europe. She worked at the same team, which underwent a name change to Aston Martin, as head of race strategy from 2020 until she left the team following the 2022 Hungarian Grand Prix. Collins cited the exhaustion of an increasing race calendar as the main reason for her leaving Aston Martin.

In 2022, she joined F1 TV as an analyst. The following year, Collins joined Sky Sports on their coverage of Formula One from that year's Saudi Arabian Grand Prix, to analyse race strategy over select race weekends and provided commentary and conducted a gridwalk. Collins received an honorary doctorate "for her contribution to sport" from Queen's University Belfast in 2023. She is the co-author with the journalist Maurice Hamilton of the 2024 book How to Win a Grand Prix: From Pit Lane to Podium.

=== Personal life ===
Collins is married to the former mechanic Ryan McGarva.
