= St. Mary's Chapel, Maguiresbridge =

Church in County Fermanagh, Northern Ireland

Coordinates: 54.295°N 7.464°W

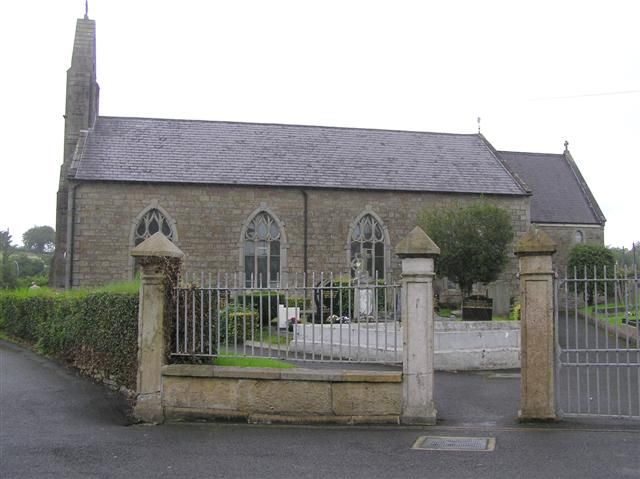
St Mary's, Maguiresbridge

St Mary's, Maguiresbridge is a Roman Catholic chapel in Maguiresbridge, County Fermanagh, Northern Ireland, erected c. 1822. The church's main source of light is pointed windows, and the altar is embellished with a painting. St Mary's church is in the parish of Lisnaskea-Maguiresbridge (Aghalurcher) in the Roman Catholic Diocese of Clogher. It is a Grade B listed building.
