= Georgie Thompson =

English TV presenter

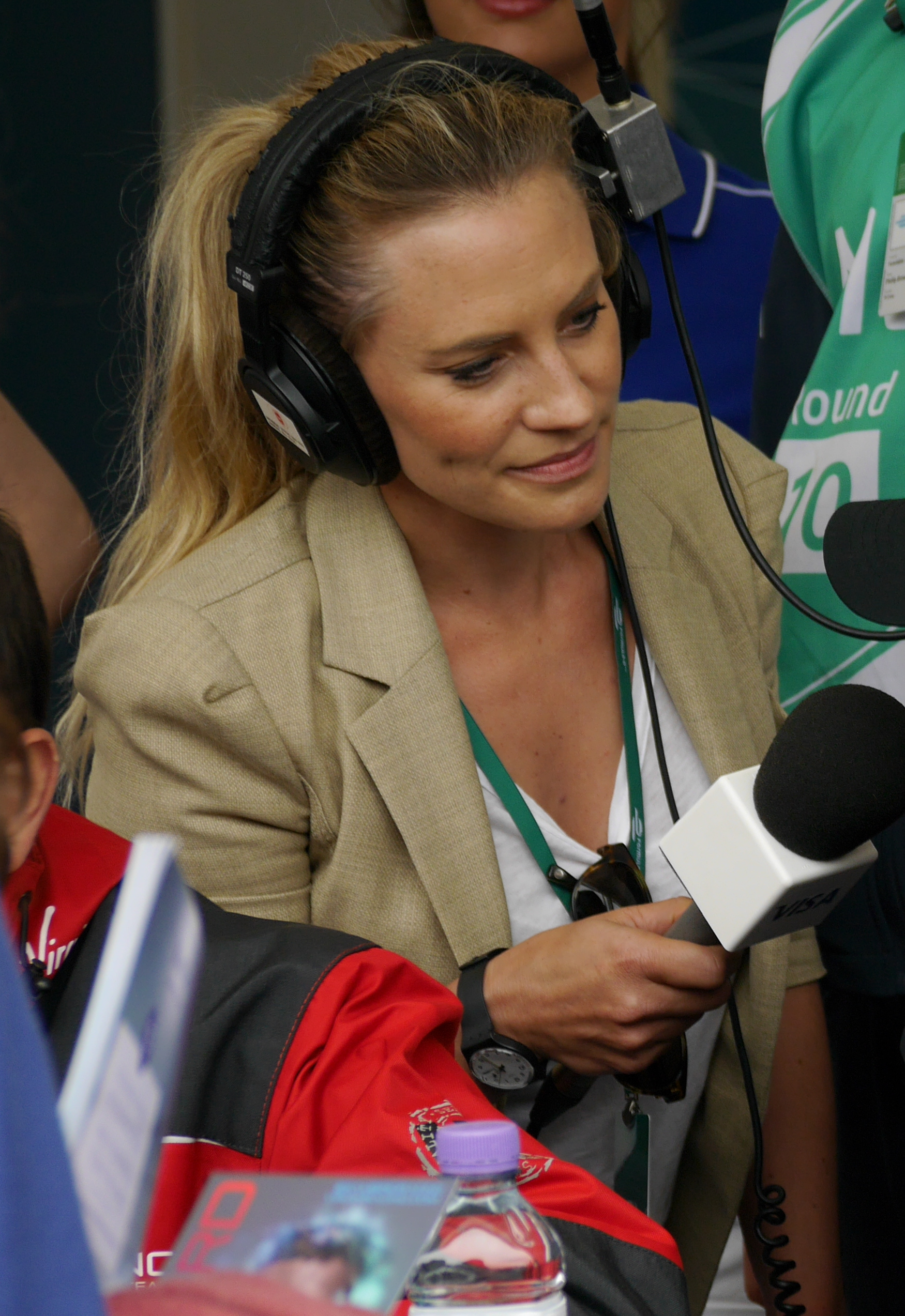
- Thompson in 2015
- Born: Georgina Jane Thompson; 25 November 1977 (age 48); Harlow, Essex, England
- Education: Queenswood School, Hertfordshire; University of Leeds
- Spouse: Ben Ainslie (m. 2014)
- Children: 2
- Presenting career
- Network: Fox Sports, BBC Radio 5 Live
- Country: United Kingdom

Georgina Jane Ainslie, Lady Ainslie (born 25 November 1977), better known as Georgie Thompson, is a British television presenter.

== Education ==
Thompson was educated at Queenswood School, an independent boarding school for girls near Hatfield in Hertfordshire, followed by the University of Leeds, where she studied Broadcast Journalism. She graduated in 1999 with a 2:1.

== Career ==
After graduating, Thompson worked as a production assistant on a research and production scheme for GMTV before moving to Sky Sports in January 2001.

She has covered major sporting events for the network since then, including the US Open Tennis, and has been part of Sky's coverage of the F1 Grand Prix, Grand Prix Masters, Speedway World Cup, Race of Champions, America's Cup and the 2011 Wimbledon Championships. She was a presenter on Sky Sports News, often presenting Afternoon Report with her run ending on 29 December 2011.

She also presented Sky1's Greatest Sporting Legends series with David Frost in 2005.

She was also a regular panellist on the Sky One show, A League of Their Own for its first four series from 2010 to 2011.

In the May 2007 issue of the British men's magazine FHM, Thompson was voted the 93rd Sexiest Female in the World.

Thompson left Sky Sports News on 29 December 2011 to become a presenter on Sky Sports F1. During the 2012 season, Thompson presented the Friday night magazine show The F1 Show alongside pit-lane reporter Ted Kravitz and during race weekends, presented the Sky Pad segment of Sky's F1 coverage, usually alongside Anthony Davidson. Thompson left Sky Sports F1 in 2013. She was replaced as co-host of The F1 Show by close friend Sky Sports F1 pit-lane reporter Natalie Pinkham.

Thompson moved to Fox Sports in 2013 as a panellist on Regis Philbin's sports talk show Crowd Goes Wild, which aired its final show on Thursday, 8 May 2014.

It was announced on 1 July 2014 that Thompson would be one of the new presenters of BBC Radio 5 Live's Saturday Morning comedy show Fighting Talk, sharing duties with comedian Josh Widdicombe. They both left in August 2016, and previous host Colin Murray returned.

== Personal life ==
Thompson was in a relationship with Declan Donnelly from January 2009 until April 2011.

In September 2011, Thompson was banned from driving for 19 months, fined £1,000, and ordered to pay £100 in costs after being caught at more than twice the legal limit for drunk driving. On 20 December 2014, Thompson married British sailor Ben Ainslie. The couple have two children.
