= David Croft (broadcaster) =

British sports announcer (born 1970)

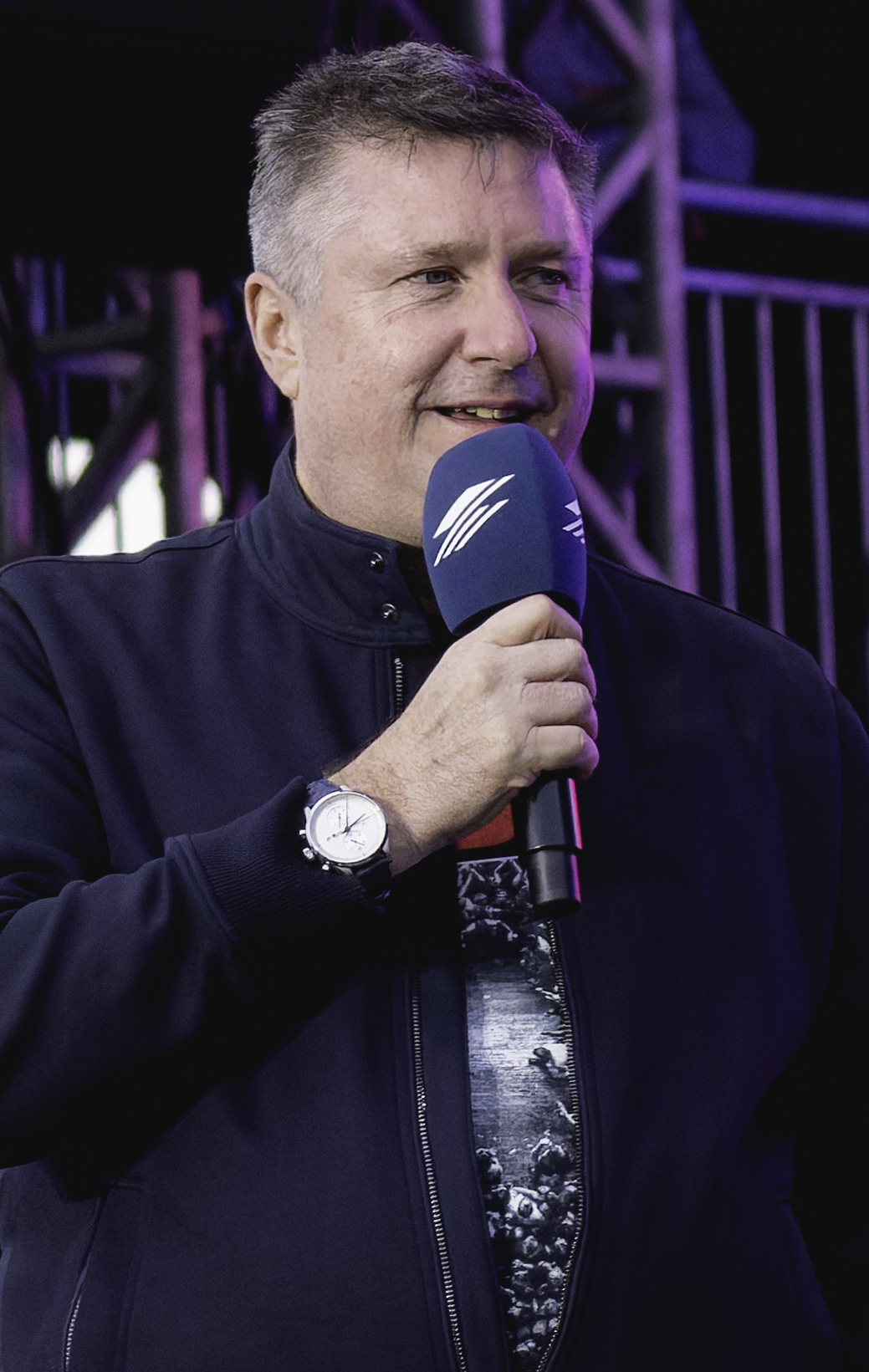
- Croft at the 2024 British Grand Prix
- Born: David Michael Croft; 19 June 1970 (age 56); Stevenage, England
- Other name: Crofty
- Employers: BBC Radio (1998–2011); BBC Sport (2004–2012); Sky Sports (2012–present)
- Known for: Commentary of Formula One and darts

David Michael Croft (born 19 June 1970), also referred to as Crofty, is a British sports broadcaster. Since 2012, Croft has served as the lead commentator of Formula One on Sky Sports, which was the global broadcast until 2022; he previously worked for BBC Sport on coverage of the BDO World Darts Championship from 2004 to 2012.

== Early career ==
David Michael Croft was born on 19 June 1970 and raised in Stevenage, Hertfordshire, England. He began his broadcasting career in hospital radio at Radio Fairfield. He spent three years working at BBC Three Counties Radio, first as a sports reporter then as sports editor. He moved to BBC Radio 5 Live in December 1998. During his time at the station he covered the 2002 FIFA World Cup and 2004 Athens Summer Olympics and presented Saturday Sport on 5 during both the summer of 2004 and 2005.

== BBC Sport/Sky Sports commentator ==
=== Formula One commentator ===
==== BBC Radio and Television ====
Croft was the BBC Radio 5 Live Formula One commentator and presenter, succeeding Maurice Hamilton at the start of the 2006 Formula 1 season. He worked alongside former Super Aguri, BAR and Minardi F1 driver Anthony Davidson and pitlane reporters Ted Kravitz and Natalie Pinkham, covering each Grand Prix and qualifying as well as the three practice sessions which could be heard via the BBC Red Button service, BBC Sport Online and BBC Radio 5 Live Sports Extra.

Croft has also commentated on the BDO World Darts Championship and Winmau World Masters for BBC Television from 2004 to 2012 after first covering the World Championship for BBC Radio 5 Live in 2002.

==== Sky Sports ====
Sky Sports announced on 7 December 2011 that Croft would be lead commentator for their coverage of F1 for the 2012 season, and would be joined by Anthony Davidson, Ted Kravitz, Natalie Pinkham, Martin Brundle, and was joined by Jenson Button since the 2019 season.

Croft celebrated his 250th Grand Prix as a Formula One commentator at the 2019 Azerbaijan Grand Prix.

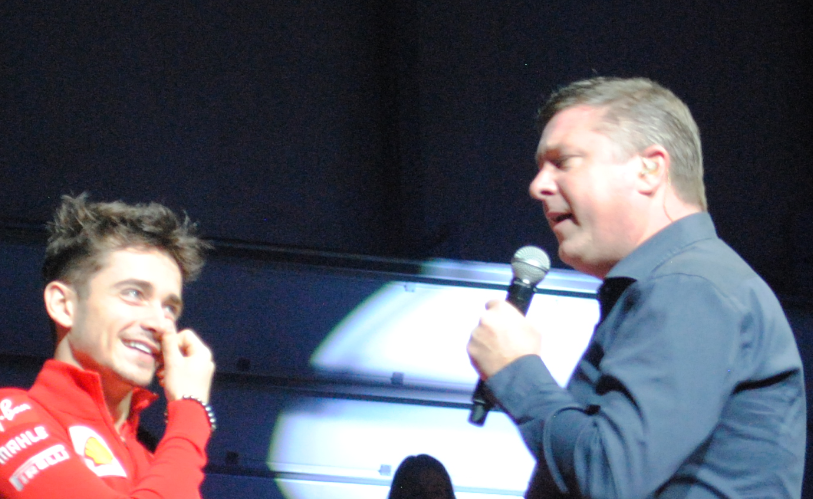
Croft with Charles Leclerc at Autosport International 2020

On 22 February 2024, Croft announced he would not be commentating for Sky Sports F1 on three of the races during the 2024 Formula One World Championship which is scheduled to have 24 rounds. Harry Benjamin stepped in for Croft at that year's Emilia Romagna Grand Prix in May, the Austrian Grand Prix in June, and the Azerbaijan Grand Prix in September. This was to manage his workload and spend more time with family, including his wedding to Laura Bradley. This marked the first time Croft had missed commentating on a race since the 2007 European Grand Prix and first such occasion he had not commentated on a race for Sky Sports F1 since its inception in 2012.

== Further commentary work ==
His work outside the BBC has included commentary on:

- Two rounds of the 2010 FIA GT1 World Championship and FIA GT3 European Championship in Brno and Portimao as well as one round of the 2011 FIA GT1 World Championship and FIA GT3 European Championship season, both at Silverstone.
- Boxing for Premier Sports including an early Tyson Fury fight
- Boxing for Setanta Sports including Joe Calzaghe's final professional fight against Roy Jones Jr. at Madison Square Garden
- The 2008 and 2009 Freerunning World Championship
- The 2009 Goodwood Revival and 2010, 2011 and 2012 Goodwood Festival of Speed
- The Race on Sky 1
- Red Bull Track Attack for ITV
- The F1 in Schools competition, namely for the world finals events
- Presenter of the 2014 and 2016 World Branding Awards

== In popular culture ==
He is the voice of the paddock reporter in the Codemasters F1 2010 game and in the sequel F1 2011. In F1 2012, F1 2013, and F1 2014, he guides the player through the games' respective menus, and in F1 2015 through F1 25 he is a commentator during in-game sessions alongside Anthony Davidson and, in the latter of which, Natalie Pinkham as well as Naomi Schiff. Since F1 22, he was one of the two main English commentators to choose. The other main English commentator was Alex Jacques from Channel 4 and F1 TV.

Croft also voiced the character of Lofty Crofty in the European release of Planes (2013). The character was the European equivalent of Colin Cowling. In 2023, Croft recorded sections of him speaking to be used on rapper IDK's 2023 album, F65. Croft's voice was also used for the Coachella performance from the same artist. Alongside Martin Brundle, Croft commentates on the racing sequences in the film F1 (2025).

== Radio presenter ==
Croft has previously presented a midweek sports show and a Monday night football phone-in show on BBC London 94.9FM, where he has also stood in for Paul Ross and co-presented the Breakfast show first with JoAnne Good and then Gaby Roslin.

Croft is a fan of rock music and is regular contributor to Primordial Radio with his Crofty's Tracks appearing on the afternoon show with Dewsbury.
