= Maguiresbridge =

Village in County Fermanagh, Northern Ireland

Coordinates: 54.295°N 7.465°W

Maguiresbridge: Irish: Droichead Mhig Uidhir
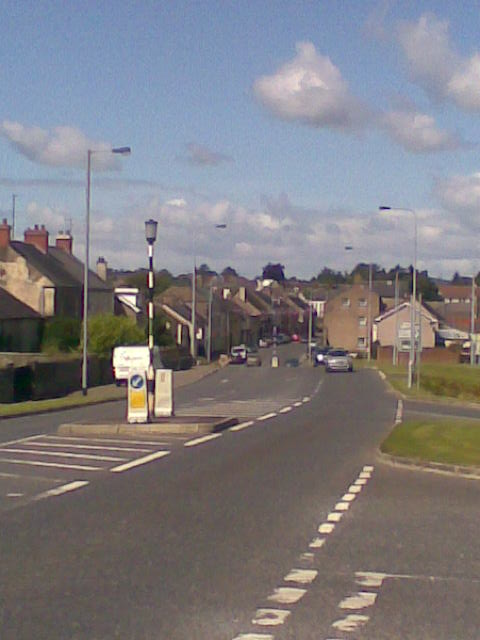
- Maguiresbridge from the Lisnaskea Road

- Location within Northern Ireland
- Population: 940 (2021 Census)
- Irish grid reference: H347383
- District: Fermanagh and Omagh
- County: County Fermanagh
- Country: Northern Ireland
- Sovereign state: United Kingdom
- Post town: ENNISKILLEN
- Postcode district: BT94
- Dialling code: 028
- UK Parliament: Fermanagh and South Tyrone
- NI Assembly: Fermanagh and South Tyrone

Maguiresbridge is a small village in County Fermanagh, Northern Ireland. The village is named after the bridge over the Colebrooke River, first built by the local Maguire family about 1760. The nearest town is Lisnaskea, 3 miles (5 km) to the south. Enniskillen is 8 miles (13 km) to the west.

== History ==
=== Old railway ===
At the beginning of the 20th century Maguiresbridge was a major railway junction linking Derry, Omagh, and Belfast to north Leinster.

Maguiresbridge railway station on the Great Northern Railway opened on 1 March 1859 and was shut on 1 October 1957. The station serving as the western terminus of the narrow gauge Clogher Valley Railway opened on 2 May 1887 and was shut on 1 January 1942.

=== The Troubles ===
On 17 November 1981 Albert Beacom, a Corporal in the Ulster Defence Regiment, was shot dead by the Provisional Irish Republican Army while working on his farm outside Maguiresbridge.

On 11 February 1986 an off-duty member of the Royal Ulster Constabulary, Derek Breen (29), was shot dead by the Provisional Irish Republican Army in the Talk of the Town Bar (now the Coach Inn). During the same incident John McCabe (25), who was working as a barman there, was caught in the gunfire and died on scene.

=== 21st century ===
Maguiresbridge grew considerably during the 2010s, with the building of five new housing developments comprising 350 houses. New shops were also built during this time.

In July 2025, Maguiresbridge was the site of a suspected murder-suicide shooting in which three members of a local family were killed.

== Demographics ==
=== 2021 census ===
Residents could identify as more than one nationality.

National Identity of Maguiresbridge residents (2021)
Nationality	Per cent
British	44.13%
Northern Irish	31.34%
Irish	29.93%

On census day in 2021, the resident population of Maguiresbridge village was 940. This incorporates NISRA Census areas Erne East C2 and C3. Of these:

- 40.67% (381) identified as Roman Catholic religion.
- 42.15% (395) identified as 'Protestant and Other Christian' religions.
- 16.54% (155) had no religious background.
- 0.64% (6) had an 'Other' religious background.
- 35.92% (337) indicated that they had a British only identity,
- 28.14% (264) had an Irish only identity
- 22.60% (212) had a Northern Irish only identity

=== 2011 census ===
On the day of the 2011 census, 27 March 2011, there were 1,020 people living in Maguiresbridge. Of these:

- 24.80% were aged under 16 years
- 11.37% were aged 65 or over
- 52.16% were female and 47.84% were male
- 49.61% were from a Protestant background
- 46.47% were from a Catholic background
- 5.65% of people aged between 16 and 74 were unemployed

== Education ==
Local primary schools include St. Mary's Roman Catholic Primary and Maguiresbridge Controlled Primary.

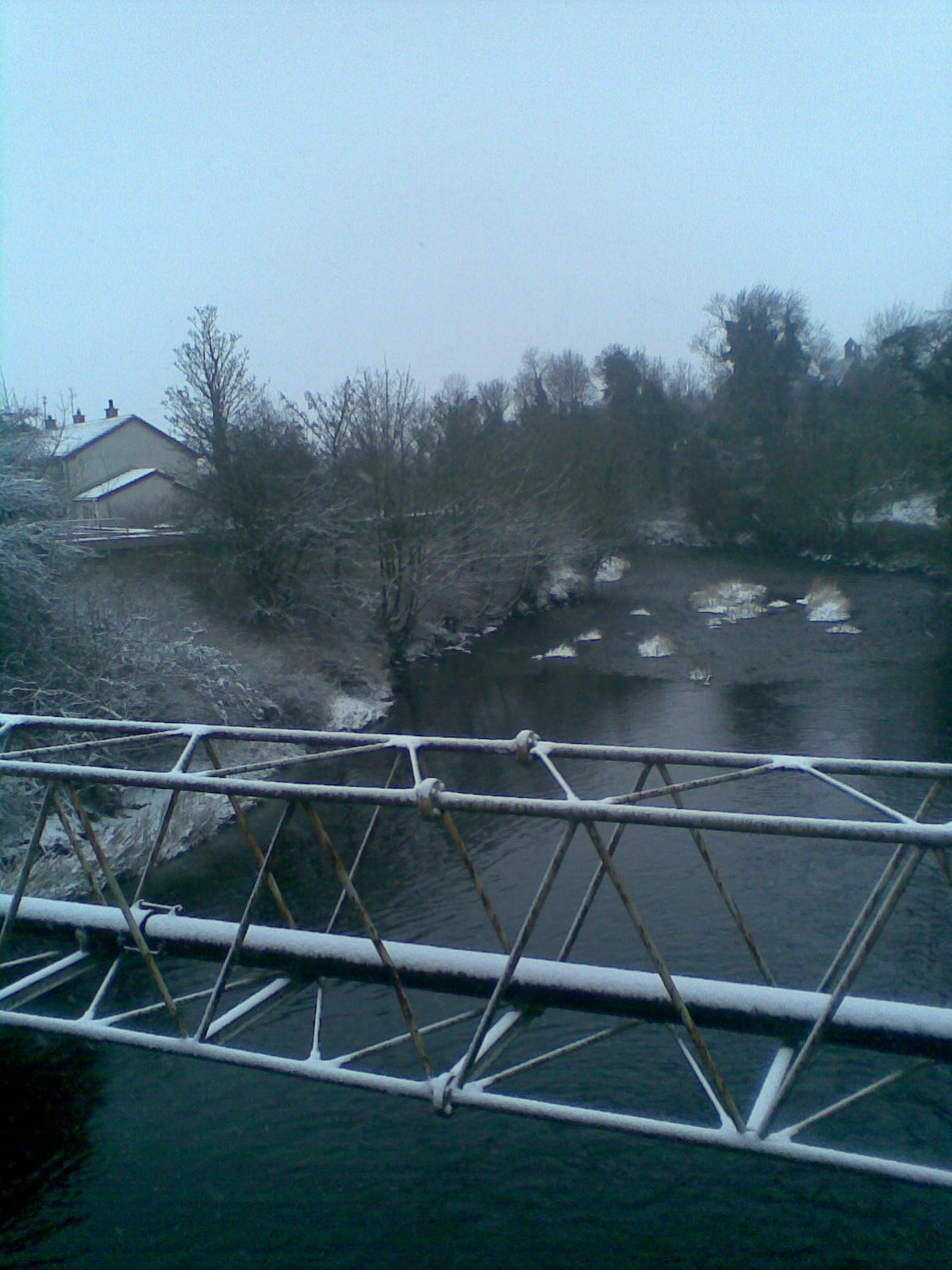
The Colebrooke River which runs through the village

== Religion ==
The local Roman Catholic church is Saint Mary's Church, and the local Church of Ireland church is Christchurch. There are also Methodist and Presbyterian churches.

== Sport ==
Maguiresbridge is home to both a soccer and Gaelic football club. Saint Mary's GFC is a Gaelic football club with its grounds on the Drumgoon Road, whilst the soccer club plays its games in Lisnaskea.

Bernadette Collins, who worked as head of race strategy for the Aston Martin Formula One Team from 2020 to 2022, was born and raised in the town.

== People ==
- John Early (1814–1873), Catholic priest and educator who was the founder and first president of Loyola College in Maryland
- Bernadette Collins (b.1985/1986), engineer
