= Ted Kravitz =

British journalist (born 1974)

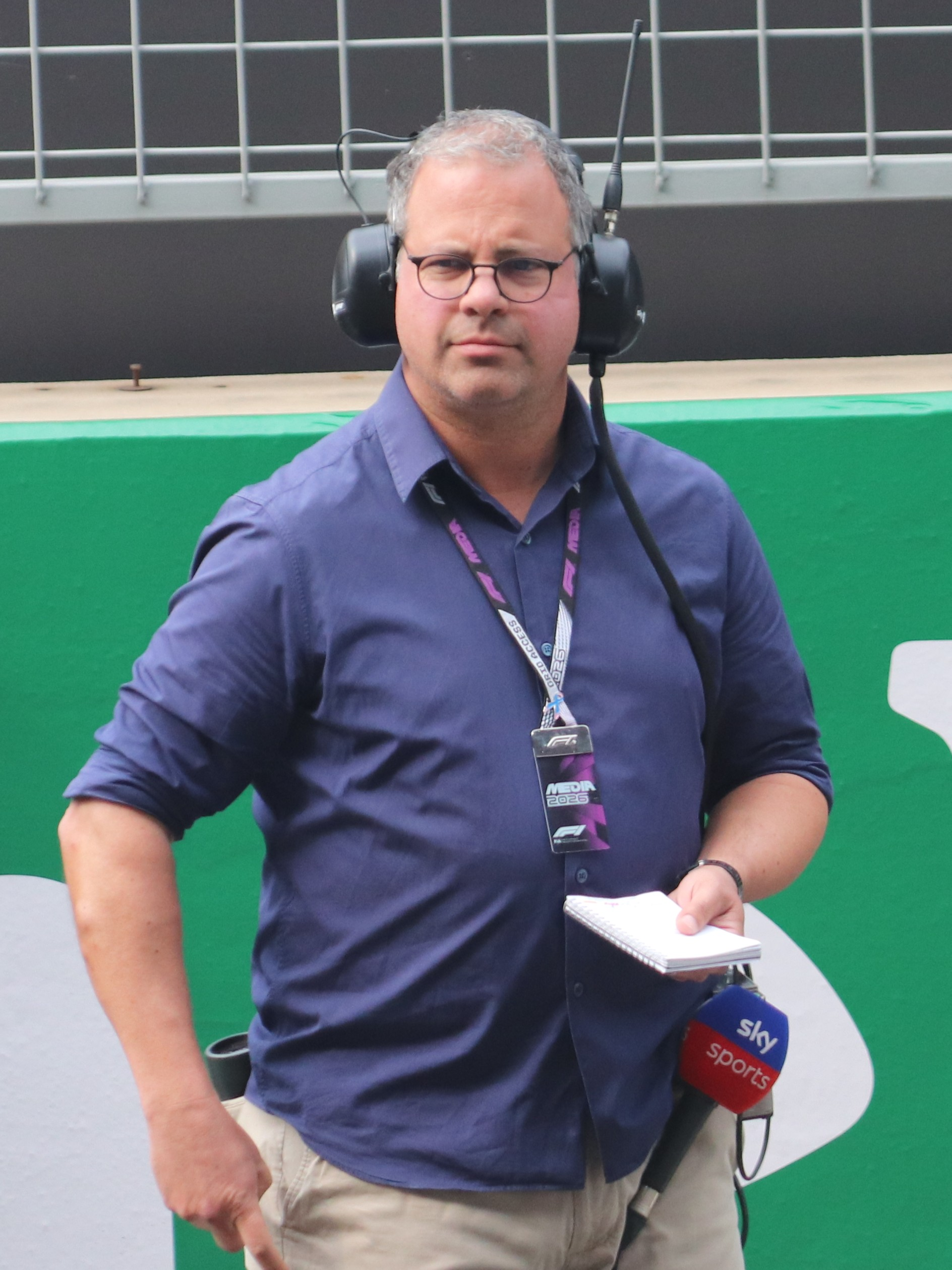
- Kravitz in 2026
- Born: Theodore Joseph Nathaniel Slotover; 21 March 1974 (age 52); Hammersmith, London, England
- Education: City of London School; University of Exeter
- Occupation: Television presenter
- Years active: 1994–present
- Employer: Sky Sports
- Known for: Formula 1 reportage
- Website: www.tedkravitz.com

Ted Kravitz (born Theodore Joseph Nathaniel Slotover; 21 March 1974) is a British Formula One pit-lane reporter who works for Sky Sports F1.

In addition to his role as a pit-lane reporter, Kravitz is known for his in-depth technical analysis and insights into the world of Formula One. He is the presenter and producer of Ted's Notebook, a segment that explores the technical aspects of each race weekend. Kravitz has been a prominent figure in the Formula One community for over two decades and is widely respected for his knowledge and passion for the sport. Prior to joining Sky Sports F1, Kravitz worked as a pit-lane reporter for both ITV and BBC Sport's coverage of Formula One. Outside his work in motorsport, Kravitz has also presented and produced content for various television and radio programmes.

== Career ==
=== Early career ===
Kravitz was born in Hammersmith, London. His mother is American and is from Union City, New Jersey. While at university, he began presenting on University Radio Exeter. Upon graduation, he trained as a journalist at CBS News' London bureau before working for local radio stations in the South-West of England as a news and sports reporter. He then returned to London to work for 95.8 Capital FM, on their Sony Award-winning news show, The Way It Is.

After a spell as a news and sports reporter for LBC and London News Direct, Kravitz joined Chrysalis Television at the end of 1996 to work on their Grand Prix programming.

=== ITV ===
Kravitz worked with ITV from the beginning of its F1 coverage in 1997, initially as a producer, and then as a pit-lane reporter from 2002, alongside Louise Goodman. He replaced James Allen who was promoted to the post of race commentator, following the retirement of Murray Walker.

In 2007 and 2008, he presented ITV's British Touring Car Championship coverage.

=== BBC ===
Kravitz continued his pit-lane role, alongside Lee McKenzie, when Formula One coverage moved to the BBC in 2009, and remained in this position until the end of 2011.

=== Sky Sports F1 ===
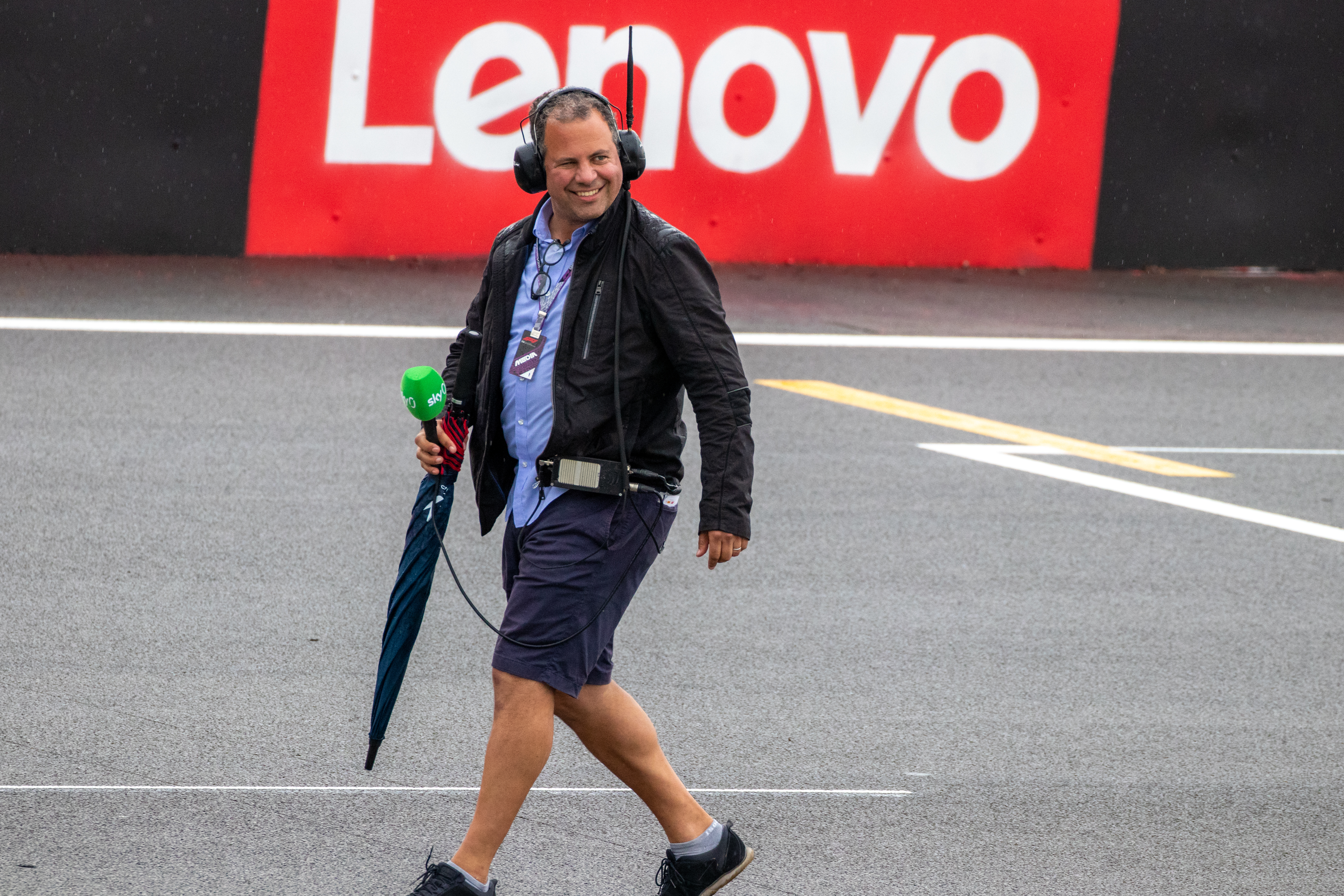
Kravitz working for Sky Sports F1 at the 2022 British Grand Prix

In December 2011, it was announced that Kravitz would follow Martin Brundle and others from the BBC to join Sky's Sky Sports F1 coverage in 2012. As part of his new role, Kravitz hosts the channel's weekly show, The F1 Show. For the 2012 season, he was joined by co-presenter Georgie Thompson. From 2013, following Thompson's departure, Kravitz presents The F1 Show with Sky Sports F1's Natalie Pinkham.

In addition to working on The F1 Show, Kravitz was also given a more prominent role in Formula 1 coverage, with Ted's Notebook, a short segment in the show where Kravitz provides technical information from the paddock, such as problems with cars, technical data, etc. Kravitz is also present for the Formula 1 winter testing. A nightly episode of Ted's Notebook is shown during coverage to provide information on what each team had been doing throughout each test day.

Controversy arose in October 2022 following the 2022 United States Grand Prix after comments by Kravitz claiming that Lewis Hamilton was robbed of the 2021 Formula One championship. This resulted in a boycott by Max Verstappen and his Red Bull Racing team of participation in all Sky Sports interviews and programmes during the weekend of the 2022 Mexico City Grand Prix. On 20 September 2024, ahead of the first practice session for the 2024 Singapore Grand Prix a pre-recorded segment of Kravitz analysing the Ferrari SF-24 was accidentally aired uncensored despite Kravitz using an expletive in frustration at his own performance. Both Kravitz and fellow presenter Simon Lazenby apologised to viewers for any offence caused.
