= Randy Singh =

British Formula One engineer

- Born: Randeep Singh
- Occupation: Engineer
- Employer: McLaren Racing
- Known for: Formula One engineer
- Title: Racing Director

Randeep "Randy" Singh is a British Formula One engineer. He is currently the racing director for the McLaren Racing Formula One team.

== Career ==
After graduating from Oxford University Singh landed an internship for Williams Racing as a strategy engineer for the 2008 Formula One season. He then decided to step away from motorsport and became a consultant for Stroud Consulting and KPMG.

Singh returned to motorsports in 2013 as a trackside strategy engineer at Williams, where he contributed to race-day decision-making and collaborated closely with the engineering team over a two-year period. In early 2015, he was appointed Head of Race Strategy at Force India for the start of the Formula One season. Later that year, Singh transitioned to McLaren as a Senior Strategy Engineer.

In early 2018, he was promoted to head McLaren's Strategy Department, where he oversaw data analysis, strategy development, and coordination with technical teams. In 2020, his portfolio was expanded to include oversight of sporting and FIA liaison matters. In 2024, Singh assumed the role of Racing Director for the McLaren team, reporting directly to Team Principal Andrea Stella.
