= Will Joseph (engineer) =

British Formula One engineer

- Born: William Joseph
- Occupation: Engineer
- Employer: McLaren Racing
- Known for: Formula One engineer
- Title: Race Engineering Director

William Joseph is a British Formula One engineer. He is currently the race engineering director for the McLaren Racing Formula One team and race engineer for Lando Norris.

== Career ==
Joseph graduated from the University of Cambridge with a Master of Engineering in Aerothermal and Aerospace Engineering. He began his career at McLaren in 2006 as a rear suspension engineer, where he designed key components including carbon wishbones, brake ducts, and damper units. In 2010, Joseph served as Build Engineer, ensuring efficient communication between the factory and the trackside team, and in 2011, he specialised in simulator testing.

By 2012, he had moved to trackside performance engineering, working initially with Lewis Hamilton, before moving on to Sergio Pérez, Kevin Magnussen and Fernando Alonso. In October 2017, he became the lead race engineer for Alonso and then later for Lando Norris.

In 2024—alongside his duties as race engineer for Norris—he was promoted to Director of Race Engineering, overseeing all aspects of race operations.
