= Race engineer =

Position in motorsport

Race Engineer
Occupation
- Occupation type: Profession
- Activity sectors: Applied sciences

Description
- Competencies: Aerodynamics, vehicle dynamics, systems engineering, applied mathematics, management skills
- Education required: Engineering education
- Fields of employment: Motorsport

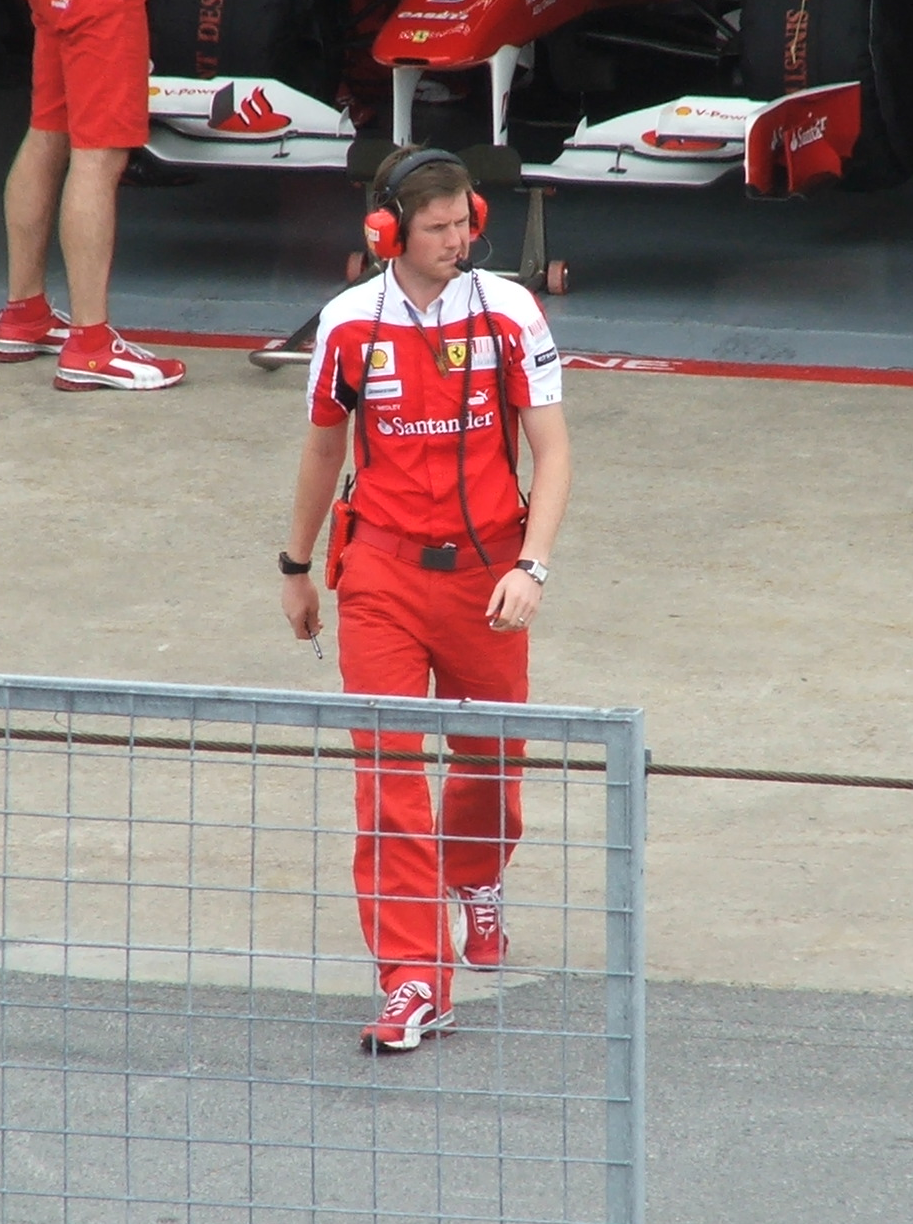
Scuderia Ferrari race engineer Rob Smedley at the Formula 1 2010 Canadian Grand Prix.

A race engineer is a motorsport team member who analyses data to achieve the best performance from the vehicle and driver. The race engineer communicates with the team's data analyst, mechanics, and driver, both between and during races. Off the race track, the race engineer analyses historical data to determine the initial set-up for the next race event or test. The race engineer's duties also include hands-on management of the vehicle mechanics, organization of the testing schedule, and assurance of compliance with regulations. The race engineer seeks to make these activities occur as seamlessly as possible for the driver. Race engineers almost always have an academic degree in engineering or a related field.

To be effective, the race engineer must have a good working relationship with not only the driver but also the rest of the team. Many times the race engineer is also "the face" of the team for the media; primarily during the race while the driver is inaccessible. This makes the race engineer's media skills a priority.

== History ==
The role of the race engineer on racing teams has grown in importance since the adoption of on-board sensors that collect performance data. The race engineer's job is to evaluate the vehicle's performance gathered from both telemetry and the driver's feedback. The race engineer then seeks to improve performance with regard to the driver's desires by adjusting suspension, engine calibrations, aerodynamics, and other variables which affect the vehicle's performance on the race track.

== Travel ==
Race engineers tend to travel extensively, especially during the racing season of their motorsport teams. At the highest level of professional motorsports, international travel is common. Offseason travel for race engineers is usually for testing, training, and visiting vendors.

== See also ==
- Automotive aerodynamics
- Automotive engineering
- Control theory
- Mechanical engineering
