= Natalie Pinkham =

British television and radio presenter (born 1977)

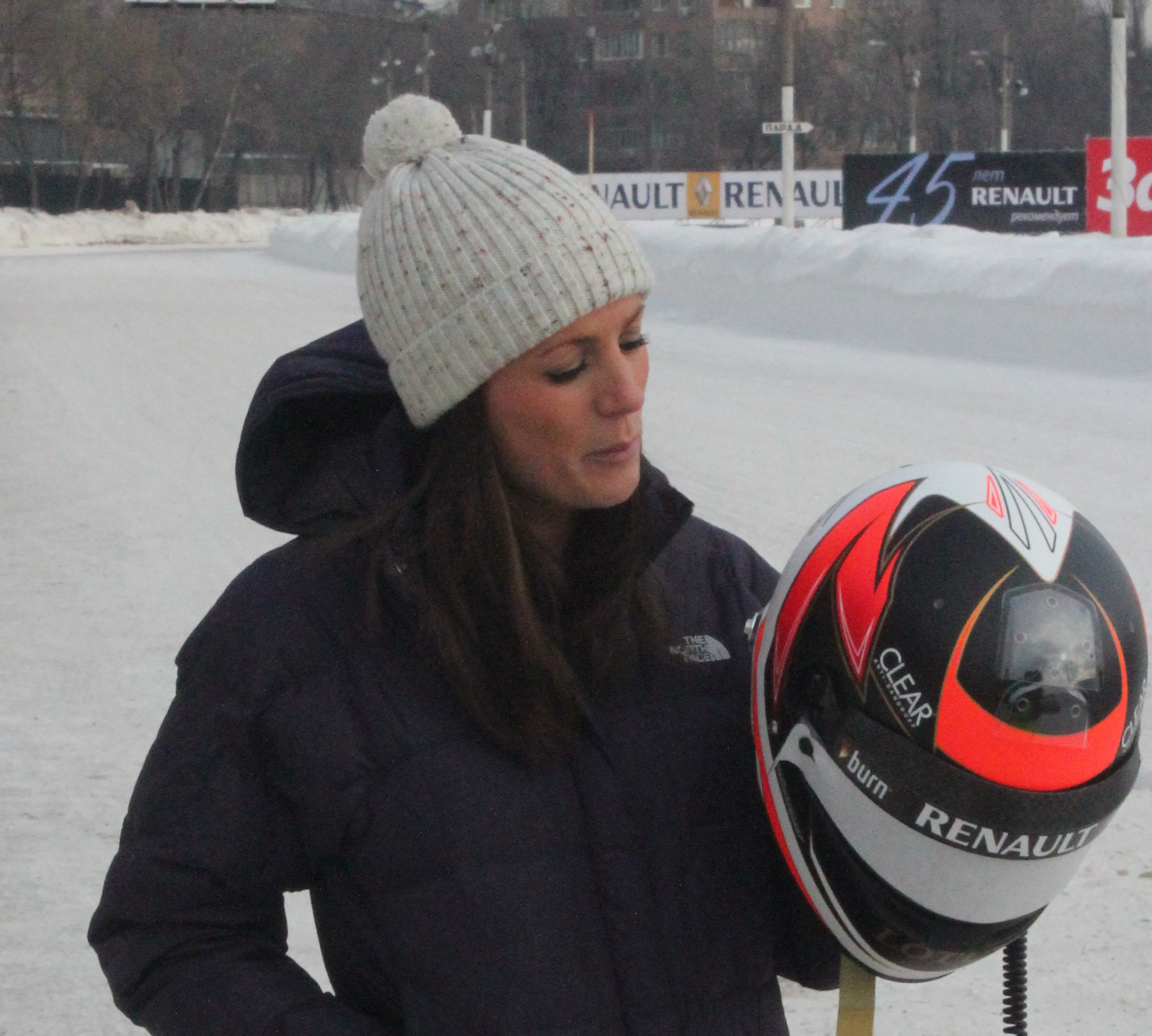
- Pinkham in 2013
- Born: Natalie Jane Pinkham; 20 September 1977 (age 48); Buckinghamshire, England, UK
- Other name: Pinks
- Education: Queenswood School, Hertfordshire; Rugby School, Warwickshire
- Alma mater: University of Nottingham
- Occupation: Television presenter
- Employer: Sky Sports
- Spouse: Owain Walbyoff (m. 2012)
- Children: 2
- Relatives: Sam Pinkham (brother)

Natalie Jane Pinkham (born 20 September 1977) is a British television presenter and Formula One pit lane reporter for Sky Sports F1, having held the same post for BBC Radio 5 Live in 2011. She is also known for hosting Police Interceptors Special Edition on 5*. She appeared on Live from Studio Five as a guest presenter and was a regular panellist on The Wright Stuff.

== Early life ==
Pinkham was born in Buckinghamshire to barrister mother Joy, and property developer John, Natalie and her older DJ brother Sam, who presents the early morning show for Virgin Radio, were raised at the family home in Northants. Pinkham was educated at Queenswood School, an independent boarding school with fellow presenter and friend Georgie Thompson; and then as a day girl at Rugby School, before studying politics at the University of Nottingham.

== Career ==
After graduation, she joined Endemol as a researcher on BBC Two's Ready Steady Cook, and then as an assistant producer on International King of Sports. She then worked for IMG/TWI as an assistant producer on Superstars.

Moving in front of the camera, she hosted the Isle of Man TT races for Men and Motors, reported from the Tennis Masters Cup in the United States for Sky Sports and fronted Chelsea F.C.'s Blues News. Pinkham co-hosted ITV4's World Cuppa with Absolute Radio's Christian O'Connell and BBC Radio 5 Live's Steve Bunce during the 2006 FIFA World Cup; whilst also presenting an internet World Cup show for Nobok Sports site. In recent years Pinkham has also hosted the International Rugby Awards with Joel Stransky in 2004; the SALSA fashion show in 2004 with Craig Doyle; GOAL's Aura of Asia fundraising event with Liz Bonnin in 2005 and Extreme Sports Channel's coverage of the Euro Beach Soccer League and the Beach Soccer World Cup Draw with Eric Cantona in 2006. Along with ITV Fixers 'The Big Fix', The Salon Prive dinner and the Boodles Tennis Invitational, all in 2010.

Pinkham has also been a poker presenter, becoming the face of The Poker Channel for two years; she host the British Poker Open, the World Cup of Poker, The Scandinavian Poker Awards with Mads Mikkelsen in 2007 and a How to Play Poker DVD for Virgin Games. She also penned interviews with some of the world's top pros and filmed the European Poker Tour for Challenge and Eurosport.

Scheduled to present Heart London's Friday evening show from January 2008, on 7 January 2008 it was officially announced that she would be competing in ITV1's Dancing on Ice, partnered with Russian Andrei Lipanov and being taught to skate by ice legends Torvill and Dean. Pinkham was reported to earn £35,000 for taking part but exited in Week 2 on 20 January 2008 after a skate-off with ex-Blue Peter presenter Tim Vincent and his partner Viktoria Borzenkova.

In 2009, Pinkham co-hosted The Goodwood Festival of Speed with Steve Rider and in 2009 and 2010 co-hosted The Goodwood Revival with Craig Doyle and Ben Fogle, respectively. In 2010, Pinkham guest presented Channel 5's Live from Studio Five and continued to be a regular panelist on The Wright Stuff. She also hosted the World Series of Poker Europe for ESPN.

Pinkham wrote regular pieces for the Mail on Sunday in the Health, Travel and Review sections.

It was confirmed on 13 January 2011 that Pinkham was to join BBC Radio 5 Live's Formula 1 commentary team as a pit lane reporter for the 2011 season - a role she took up beginning with the 2011 Australian Grand Prix.

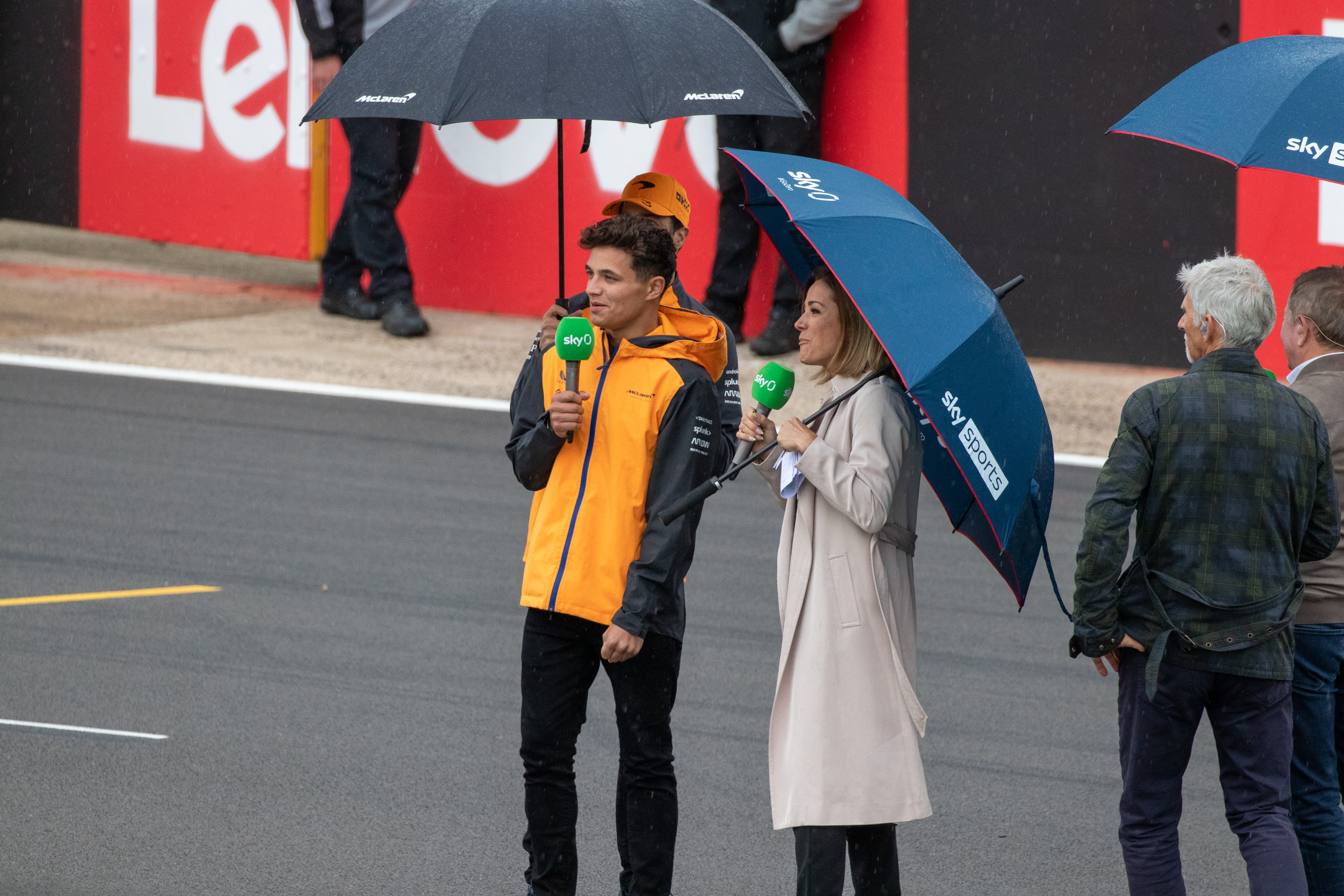
Natalie Pinkham with Lando Norris at the 2022 British Grand Prix

In December 2011, it was announced she was working for Sky Sports covering the 2012 F1 season. Her main role for the 2012 season was pit reporting throughout the practice sessions, qualifying and the race alongside other commitments like interviews. For 2013, she replaced close friend Georgie Thompson as host of The F1 Show and over following years has become a key member of the Sky Sports F1 team.

She appeared as herself in the 2025 film F1.

== Personal life ==
Pinkham is married to Owain Walbyoff, who is Managing Director at Endemol Games. In November 2010 the couple became engaged, and married in Portugal in July 2012. On 17 January 2015, Pinkham gave birth to their first child, a son. On 20 June 2016, she gave birth to their second child, a daughter. Australian Formula One driver Daniel Ricciardo is the godfather to Pinkham's son.
