= Allan McNish =

British racing driver (born 1969)

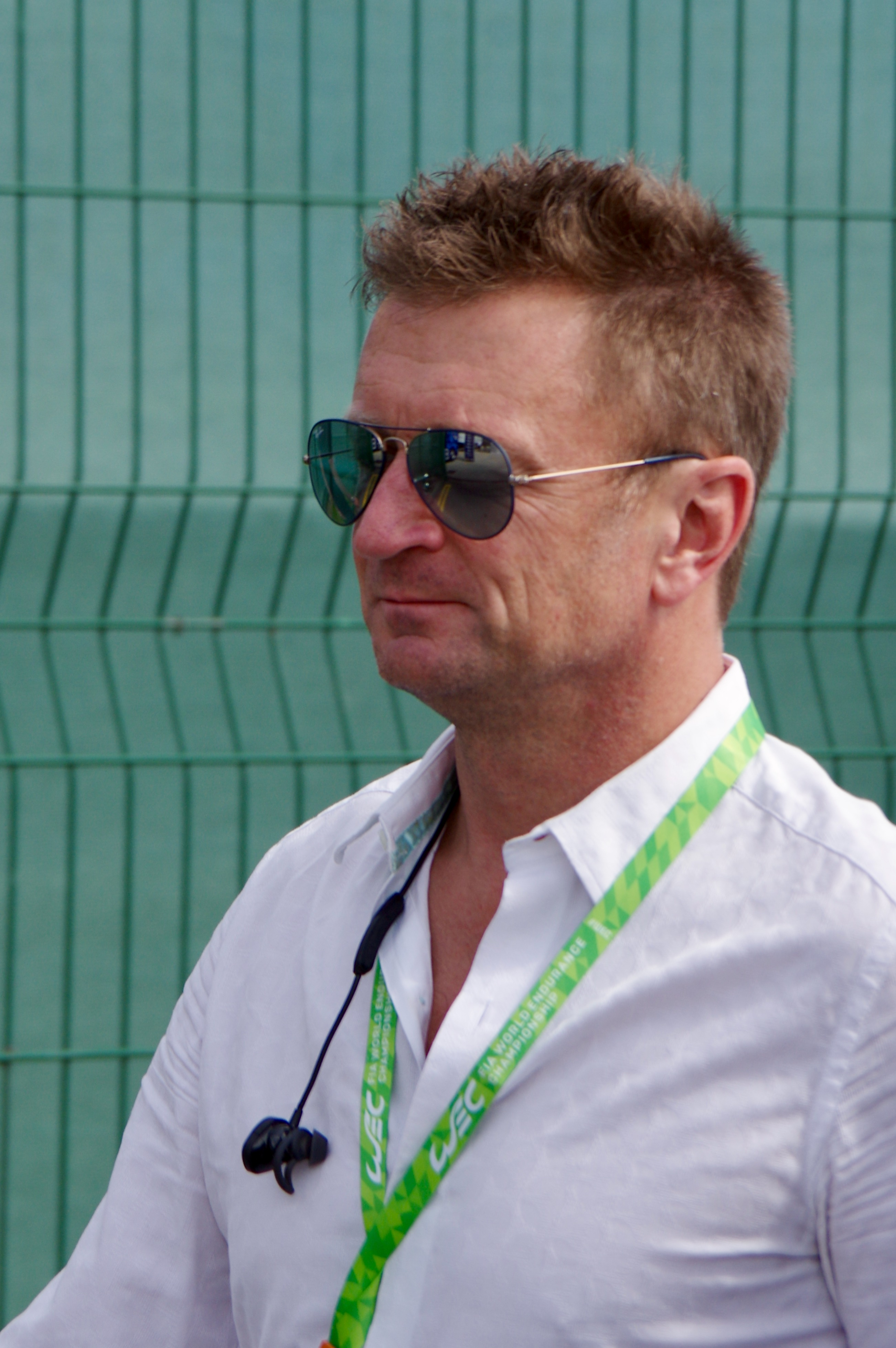
- McNish in 2019
- Nationality: (United Kingdom) British
- Born: 29 December 1969 (age 56) Dumfries, Dumfriesshire, Scotland
- Categorisation: FIA Platinum

24 Hours of Le Mans career
- Years: 1997 – 2000, 2004 – 2013
- Teams: Roock Racing, Porsche AG, Toyota Motorsports, Audi Sport Joest, Audi Sport UK, Champion Racing
- Best finish: 1st (1998, 2008, 2013)
- Class wins: 3 (1998, 2008, 2013)

Formula One World Championship career
- Active years: 2002
- Team: Toyota
- Entries: 17 (16 starts)
- Championships: 0
- Wins: 0
- Podiums: 0
- Career points: 0
- Pole positions: 0
- Fastest laps: 0
- First entry: 2002 Australian Grand Prix
- Last entry: 2002 Japanese Grand Prix

Championship titles
- 2000, 2006, 2007 2013: American Le Mans Series; FIA World Endurance Championship

Allan McNish (born 29 December 1969) is a British former racing driver, commentator and team principal from Scotland. He is a three-time winner of the 24 Hours of Le Mans, for Porsche in 1998 and for Audi in 2008 and 2013. He is also a three-time American Le Mans Series champion, and won the FIA World Endurance Championship (FIA WEC) in 2013. Previously, he raced for Toyota in Formula One in 2002. He has been a co-commentator and pundit for BBC Formula One coverage on TV, radio and online. He was team principal of the Audi Sport ABT Schaeffler Formula E team, and is now racing director of the Audi F1 Team.

== Early life and career ==
McNish was born in Dumfries, Scotland and played football while at school. He was a fan of Nottingham Forest and also supported his local club Queen of the South. It was not until McNish began in karting that he found something at which he excelled.

McNish began his career in karting like fellow Dumfries and Galloway driver David Coulthard. McNish credited the start given to both of them and Dario Franchitti as being largely down to David Leslie senior and junior.

McNish and Coulthard both were recognised with a McLaren/Autosport BRDC Young Driver of the Year award having moved up to car racing. In 1988, he won the Formula Vauxhall Lotus championship and in 1989 finished runner up to David Brabham in a close fought British Formula 3 Championship. During the late 1980s McNish shared a house with teammate Mika Häkkinen.

McNish first drove a Formula 1 car, a McLaren, during a testing session at Estoril in mid-November 1989. Tipped as a future Formula One driver, he tested with both McLaren and Benetton, whilst also competing in F3000, then the recognised second tier of European motorsport, in 1990–1992. Whilst racing his first season in F3000, McNish suffered a crash at a race in Donington Park where a bystander was fatally injured. He went on to finish fourth overall in the championship that season. Concentrating on Formula One opportunities meant he appeared in F3000 only once during 1994, at Pau.

When a Formula One drive failed to materialise, McNish returned to F3000 in 1995 with Paul Stewart Racing (run by the son of Sir Jackie Stewart who went on to form Stewart Grand Prix). While he was arguably the fastest driver of the year, a series of mishaps saw him well beaten by Super Nova drivers Vincenzo Sospiri and Ricardo Rosset in the title race. McNish's career appeared to stall in early 1996 after a deal to race in Formula Nippon fell through and Mark Blundell was preferred for a drive with the PacWest CART team. He also tested for Benetton during the year.

== Professional racing career ==
=== Sports cars ===
McNish became one of the world's most highly rated sportscar drivers. His sportscar career began in 1996 with Porsche, at a time when their 911 GT1 model revolutionised sportscar racing. With the factory team he took this car to victory in the 1998 24 Hours of Le Mans, partnered by Laurent Aïello and Stephane Ortelli. He subsequently appeared for Toyota and Audi in the race, and after losing a likely victory in the dying stages of the 2007 event, scored a second triumph in 2008 with Tom Kristensen and Rinaldo Capello driving an Audi R10. He has also raced with great success for Audi in the American Le Mans Series, winning the title with Dindo Capello in 2006 and 2007, and taking four overall victories at the 12 Hours of Sebring (2004, 2006, 2009 and 2012). At the 2011 Le Mans, McNish destroyed the car in a spectacular crash early in the race and ended the race for Audi No. 3. And again at the 2012 Le Mans, McNish made a driving error and lost a first place by crashing the Audi No. 2 car a few hours before the finish. He also codrove the No. 8 Starworks Motorsport Riley-Ford to a second-place finish at the 2012 24 Hours of Daytona.

In the 2000 American Le Mans Series season, McNish set a track record for the full circuit configuration at Sears Point International Raceway.

=== Formula One ===
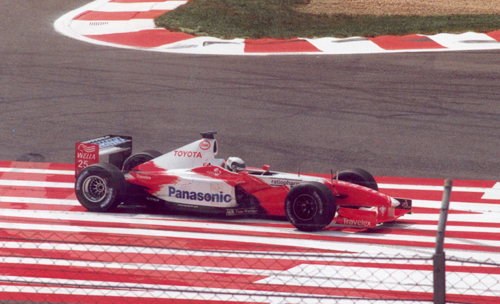
McNish's Toyota engine fails at the 2002 French Grand Prix.

McNish finally found an opening into Formula One in 2001, when the newly formed Toyota F1 team required a development driver. Given his link with Toyota through sportscars he was an obvious choice for this role, and after impressing in testing he was hired to race for the 2002 season. He did not score any points during the season's 17 races, and he and teammate Mika Salo were replaced with a new line-up of Olivier Panis and Cristiano da Matta for 2003. Salo had scored points for the team on their debut in Melbourne and McNish had very nearly done the same in the Malaysian Grand Prix, only for a pit lane mistake by the team to cost him the result. Both drivers were told of their replacement before Da Matta was announced, and ITV's Martin Brundle commented that "replacing Salo and McNish with Panis and A.N. Other" was not, in his view, a step forward.

McNish had a dramatic accident at the 130R corner while practising for Toyota's home race the Japanese Grand Prix at Suzuka, but escaped serious injury. This led to the corner being reprofiled the following year.

=== Endurance racing ===
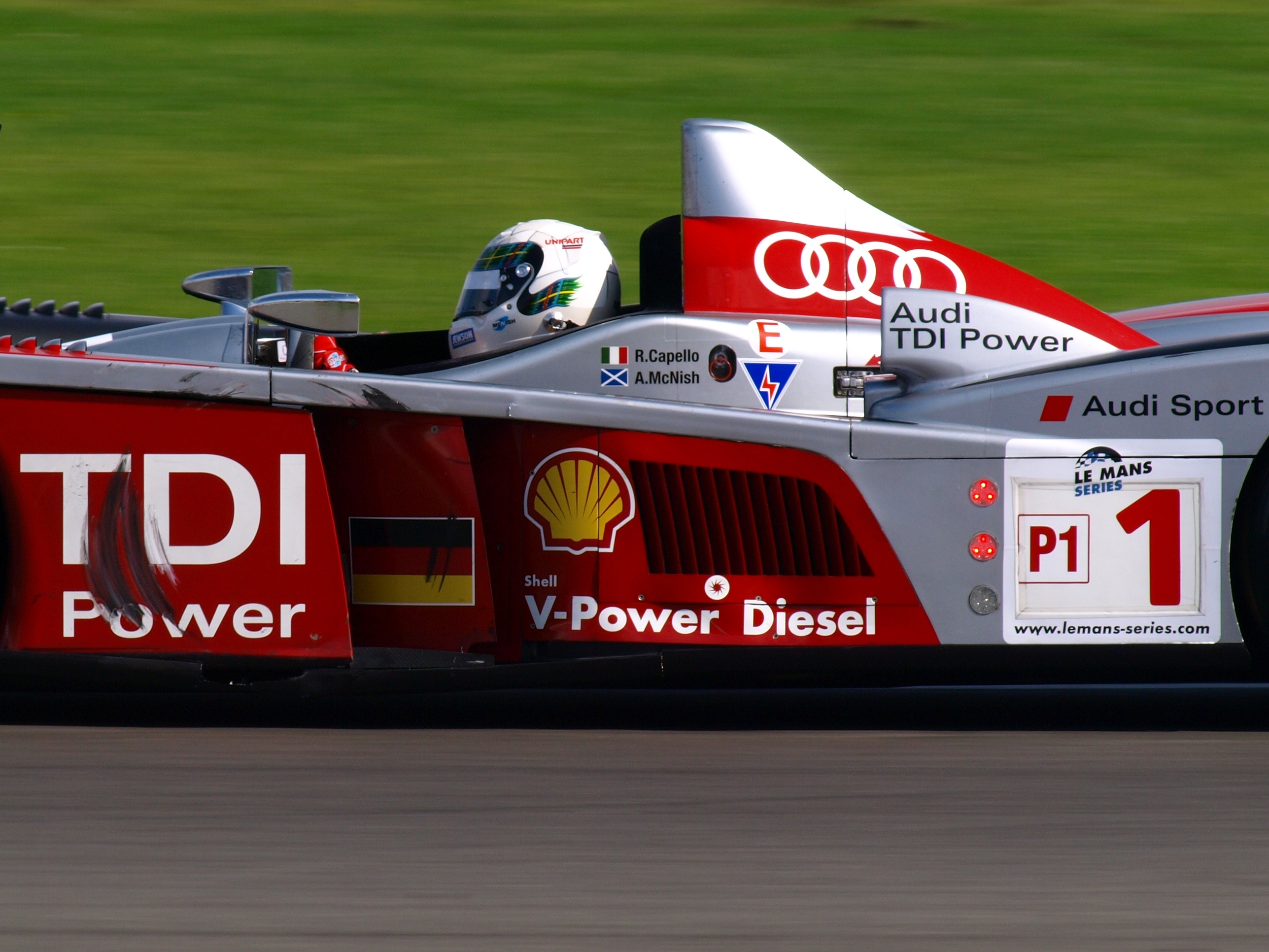
McNish driving an Audi R10 TDI at the 2008 1000km of Silverstone

In 2003, McNish was a test driver for Renault F1, also doing a little TV work for ITV, but the next year he returned to his successful sports car racing career, winning the 12 Hours of Sebring, combining this in 2005 with a venture into the highly competitive DTM (German Touring Car Championship), where he competed against the likes of former Formula One drivers Mika Häkkinen and Jean Alesi. He also won sportscar driver of the year awards from Autosport and Le Mans magazines and the (Jackie) Stewart Medal Award for services to Scottish motor sport. He was made the president of the Scottish Motor Racing Club at their annual prize giving and dinner in 2007, succeeding Stewart. McNish served as a pit reporter for ITV at the 2004 British Grand Prix standing in for Louise Goodman who was absent for event following the death of her partner John Walton days prior to that race.

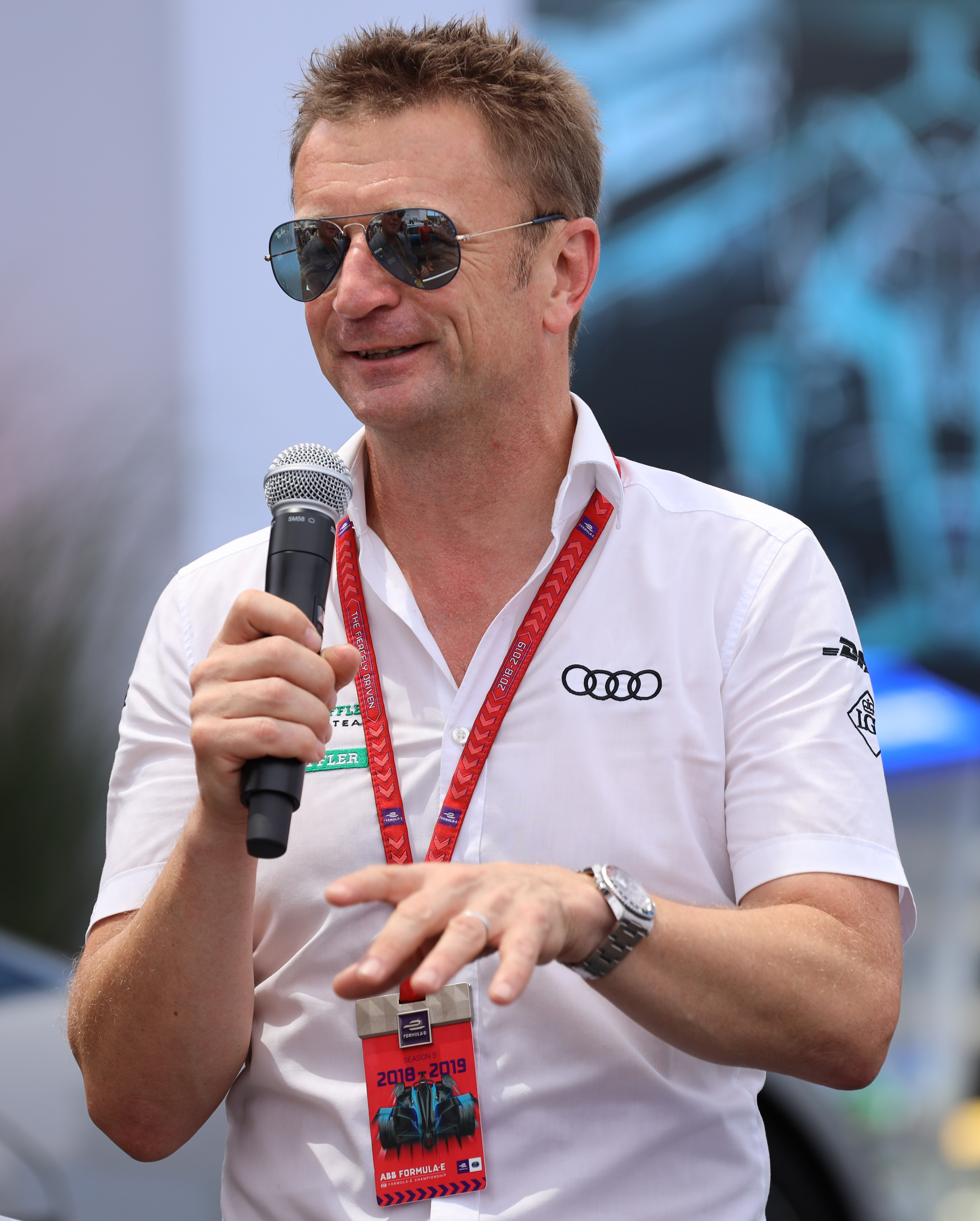
McNish speaking about Audi eTron at the 2019 New York ePrix

In 2006, McNish continued racing with the Audi factory team and was part of the driving line-up which won the 12 Hours of Sebring in the new Audi R10 TDI diesel, setting pole position and breaking the lap record. In 2008, McNish won the 24 Hours of Le Mans for Audi alongside Tom Kristensen and Rinaldo Capello. It was his first win at la Sarthe since 1998. McNish won the 2013 24 Hours of Le Mans as well with Tom Kristensen and Loïc Duval. In 2011, McNish suffered a catastrophic crash at the Le Mans race, one which left his car virtually disintegrated. However, McNish walked away from the vehicle unharmed thanks largely due to the safety improvements that had been made in recent years.

In 2013, McNish became a world champion as he won the 2013 FIA World Endurance Championship alongside Kristensen and Duval.

Since Formula One has introduced the drivers' representative on the stewards panel at all Grands Prix, McNish has featured as the drivers' representative twice in the 2011 season, in Monaco and most recently in Hungary and on both occasions he has penalised the McLaren driver Lewis Hamilton for various transgressions. He has also appeared in a Scania video test driving their new R 730 V8.

== Racing retirement and managerial roles ==
On 17 December 2013, McNish announced his retirement from Audi Sport and from racing full-time. He has not ruled out racing individual events in the future. After retiring, he took on a role with Audi Sport, including liaising between the team's drivers and engineers, between the team and motorsport organisers, and driver development. He is also manager of racing driver Harry Tincknell. He also works for BBC Sport as a commentator and pundit for their Formula One coverage. McNish became team principal for Audi's Formula E team, starting for the 2017–18 season, following Audi's official take over of the Abt Sportsline run entry.

McNish is two-time winner of the Segrave Trophy (2009/2014), was awarded the BRDC Gold Star in 2014, and won the BARC Gold Medal in 2015.

On 23 January 2026, it was announced that McNish would become the Director of the Audi Driver Development Programme, which would be "a key part of the team’s strategy to build a competitive Formula 1 team by investing in young talent on and off the track, the programme will scout and support promising young drivers from karting and junior formula series, providing a clear path to the top echelon of motorsport." On 24 April 2026, McNish took on the additional role of "Racing Director", being accountable for trackside operations at Grand Prix weekends, succeeding former Team Principal Jonathan Wheatley and reporting to CEO and Team Principal Mattia Binotto.

== Other formulae ==
As well as those above, McNish has also raced in the following racing series:

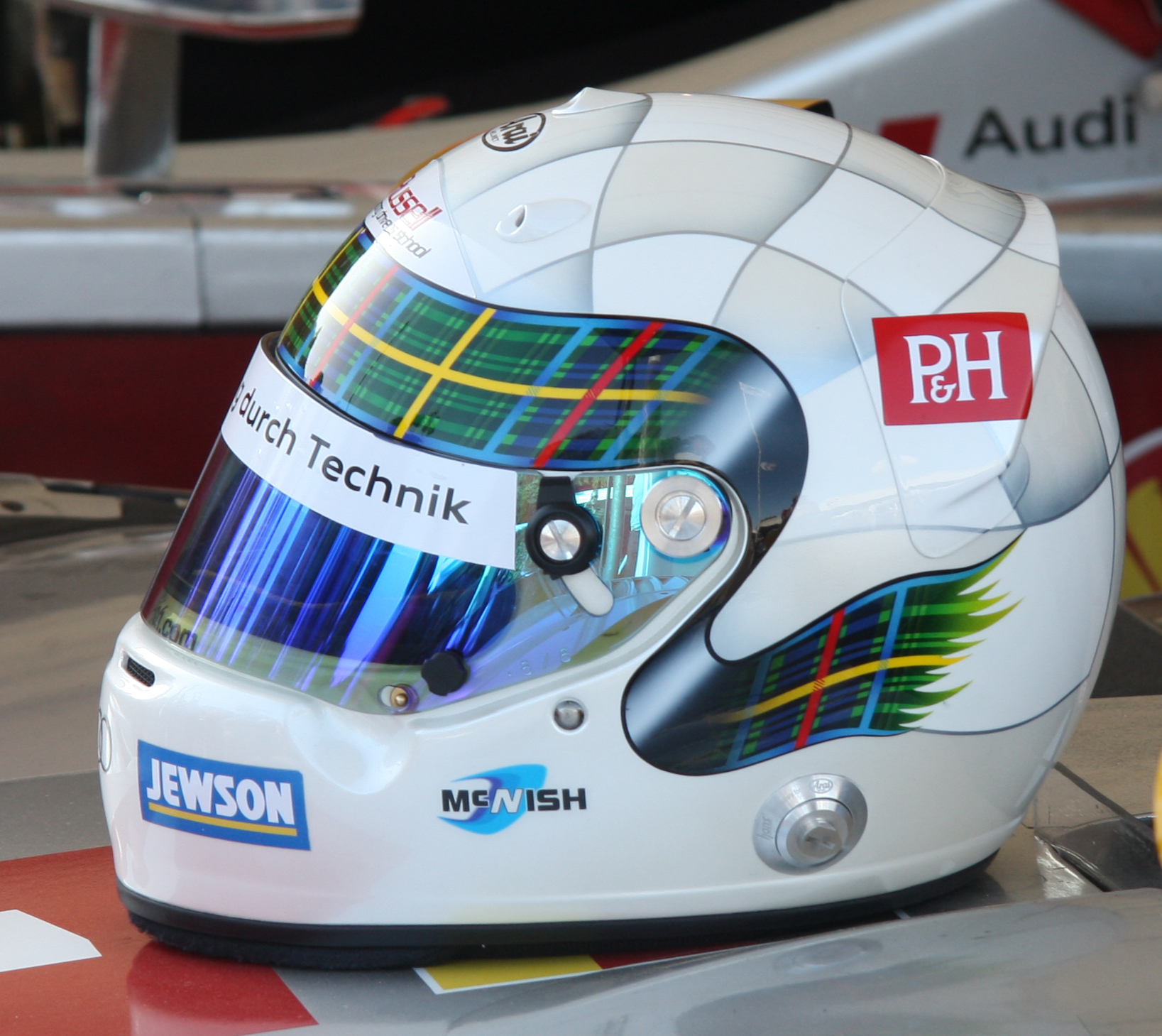
McNish's helmet for 2013.

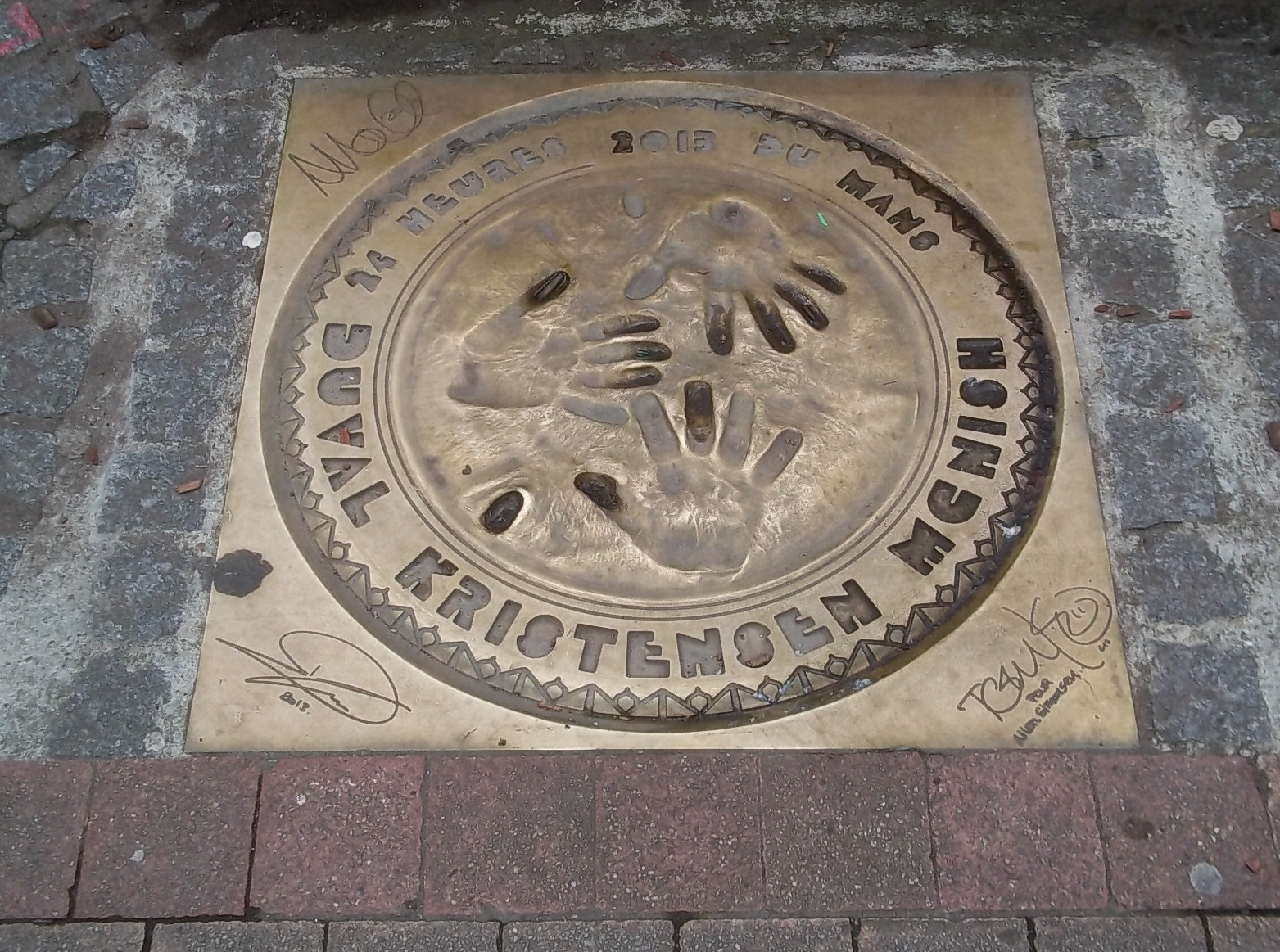
Walk of fame – Le Mans, Handprints and signatures from the winners of the 2013 edition of the 24 Hours of Le Mans

- Karting
- Formula Ford
- Vauxhall Lotus
- British Formula 3
- North American GT
- FIA GT

== Personal life ==
McNish lives in Monaco with his wife Kelly and their two children. Prior to his marriage, McNish's stag party in Dumfries was attended by Dario and Marino Franchitti and included watching a Queen of the South football match.

McNish speaks English and French.

== Racing record ==
=== Complete International Formula 3000 results ===
(key) (Races in bold indicate pole position; races in italics indicate fastest lap.)

Year	Entrant	1	2	3	4	5	6	7	8	9	10	11	DC	Points
1989	Pacific Racing	SIL	VAL	PAU	JER	PER	BRH	BIR	SPA	BUG	DIJ; 8		NC	0
1990	DAMS	DON; Ret	**SIL**; 1	PAU; 6	JER; 16	MNZ; 6	PER; 2	HOC; Ret	BRH; 1	BIR; Ret	BUG; Ret	NOG; 8	4th	26
1991	DAMS	VAL; DNQ	PAU; 13	JER; DNQ	MUG; 5	PER; 8	HOC; Ret	BRH; Ret	SPA; 8	BUG; Ret	NOG; 8		16th	2
1992	3001 International	SIL; Ret	PAU	CAT; 5	PER; Ret	HOC; 3	NÜR; Ret	SPA; 12	ALB; 5	NOG	MAG		11th	8
1994	Vortex Motorsport	SIL	PAU; Ret	CAT	PER	HOC	SPA	EST	MAG				NC	0
1995	Paul Stewart Racing	SIL; 3	**CAT**; Ret	PAU; 2	PER; Ret	HOC; 6	**SPA**; Ret	EST; Ret	MAG; 7				7th	11

=== Complete 24 Hours of Le Mans results ===
Year	Team	Co-Drivers	Car	Class	Laps	Pos.	Class Pos.
1997	(Germany) Roock Racing	(Monaco) Stéphane Ortelli (Austria) Karl Wendlinger	Porsche 911 GT1	GT1	8	DNF	DNF
1998	(Germany) Porsche AG	(France) Laurent Aïello (Monaco) Stéphane Ortelli	Porsche 911 GT1-98	GT1	351	**1st**	**1st**
1999	(Japan) Toyota Motorsports (Germany) Toyota Team Europe	(Belgium) Thierry Boutsen (Germany) Ralf Kelleners	Toyota GT-One	LMGTP	173	DNF	DNF
2000	(Germany) Audi Sport Team Joest	(France) Laurent Aïello (Monaco) Stéphane Ortelli	Audi R8	LMP900	367	**2nd**	**2nd**
2004	(United Kingdom) Audi Sport UK Team Veloqx	(Germany) Frank Biela (Germany) Pierre Kaffer	Audi R8	LMP1	350	5th	5th
2005	(United States) ADT Champion Racing	(Germany) Frank Biela (Italy) Emanuele Pirro	Audi R8	LMP1	364	**3rd**	**3rd**
2006	(Germany) Audi Sport Team Joest	(Denmark) Tom Kristensen (Italy) Rinaldo Capello	Audi R10 TDI	LMP1	367	**3rd**	**3rd**
2007	(Germany) Audi Sport North America	(Denmark) Tom Kristensen (Italy) Rinaldo Capello	Audi R10 TDI	LMP1	262	DNF	DNF
2008	(Germany) Audi Sport North America	(Denmark) Tom Kristensen (Italy) Rinaldo Capello	Audi R10 TDI	LMP1	381	**1st**	**1st**
2009	(Germany) Audi Sport Team Joest	(Denmark) Tom Kristensen (Italy) Rinaldo Capello	Audi R15 TDI	LMP1	376	**3rd**	**3rd**
2010	(Germany) Audi Sport Team Joest	(Denmark) Tom Kristensen (Italy) Rinaldo Capello	Audi R15 TDI plus	LMP1	394	**3rd**	**3rd**
2011	(Germany) Audi Sport North America	(Denmark) Tom Kristensen (Italy) Rinaldo Capello	Audi R18 TDI	LMP1	14	DNF	DNF
2012	(Germany) Audi Sport Team Joest	(Denmark) Tom Kristensen (Italy) Rinaldo Capello	Audi R18 e-tron quattro	LMP1	377	**2nd**	**2nd**
2013	(Germany) Audi Sport Team Joest	(Denmark) Tom Kristensen (France) Loïc Duval	Audi R18 e-tron quattro	LMP1	348	**1st**	**1st**

=== Complete American Le Mans Series results ===
Year	Entrant	Class	Chassis	Engine	1	2	3	4	5	6	7	8	9	10	11	12	Rank	Points	Ref
1999	Champion Racing	LMP	Porsche 911 GT1 Evo	Porsche 3.2 L Turbo Flat-6	SEB	ATL	MOS; 6	SON; 12	POR; 8	PET; 7	MON; Ret	LSV; Ret					25th	47	
2000	Audi Sport North America	LMP	Audi R8	Audi 3.6L Turbo V8	SEB; 2			NÜR; Ret	SON; 1	MOS; 1	TEX; 2	ROS; 1	PET; 1	MON; 1	LSV; 2	ADE; 1	1st	270	
2000	Audi Sport North America	LMP	Audi R8R	Audi 3.6L Turbo V8		CHA; 8	SIL; 3										1st	270	
2004	Audi Sport UK Team Veloqx	LMP1	Audi R8	Audi 3.6L Turbo V8	SEB; 1	MID	LIM	SON	POR	MOS	AME	PET	MON				7th	26	
2005	ADT Champion Racing	LMP1	Audi R8	Audi 3.6L Turbo V8	SEB; 2	ATL	MID	LIM	SON	POR	AME	MOS	PET	MON			10th	22	
2006	Audi Sport North America	LMP1	Audi R10 TDI	Audi 5.5L Turbo V12 (Diesel)	SEB; 1				UTA; 3	POR; 1	AME; 2	MOS; 1	PET; 1	MON; 1			1st	204	
2006	Audi Sport North America	LMP1	Audi R8	Audi 3.6L Turbo V8		TEX; 1	MID; 1	LIM; 1									1st	204	
2007	Audi Sport North America	LMP1	Audi R10 TDI	Audi 5.5L Turbo V12 (Diesel)	SEB; 2	STP; 1	LNB; 1	TEX; 1	UTA; 1	LIM; 1	MID; 2	AME; 1	MOS; 1	DET; 2	PET; 1	MON; 1	1st	246	
2008	Audi Sport North America	LMP1	Audi R10 TDI	Audi 5.5L Turbo V12 (Diesel)	SEB; 1	STP	LNB	UTA	LIM	MID	AME	MOS	DET	PET; 1	MON		8th	60	
2009	Audi Sport Team Joest	LMP1	Audi R15 TDI	Audi 5.5L Turbo V10 (Diesel)	SEB; 1	STP	LNB	UTA	LIM	MID	AME	MOS	PET; 3	MON			10th	30	
2010	Audi Sport Team Joest	LMP1	Audi R15 TDI plus	Audi 5.5L Turbo V10 (Diesel)	SEB	LNB	MON	UTA	LIM	MID	AME	MOS	PET; 3				NC	–	
2011	Audi Sport Team Joest	LMP1	Audi R15 TDI plus	Audi 5.5L Turbo V10 (Diesel)	SEB; 4	LNB	LIM	MOS	MID	AME	BAL	MON					NC	–	
2011	Audi Sport Team Joest	LMP1	Audi R18 TDI	Audi 3.7L Turbo V6 (Diesel)									PET; Ret				NC	–	
2012	Audi Sport Team Joest	LMP1	Audi R18 TDI	Audi 3.7L Turbo V6 (Diesel)	SEB; 1	LNB	MON	LIM	MOS	MDO	AME	BAL	VIR	PET			NC	–	
2013	Audi Sport Team Joest	P1	Audi R18 e-tron quattro	Audi 3.7L Turbo V6 (Diesel)	SEB; 2	LNB	MON	LIM	MOS	AME	BAL	COTA	VIR	PET			NC	–	

=== Complete 12 Hours of Sebring results ===
Year	Team	Co-Drivers	Car	Class	Laps	Pos.	Class Pos.
2000	(Germany) Audi Sport North America	(Italy) Rinaldo Capello (Italy) Michele Alboreto	Audi R8	LMP	360	**2nd**	**2nd**
2004	(United Kingdom) Audi Sport UK Team Veloqx	(Germany) Frank Biela (Germany) Pierre Kaffer	Audi R8	LMP1	350	**1st**	**1st**
2005	(United States) ADT Champion Racing	(Italy) Emanuele Pirro (Germany) Frank Biela	Audi R8	LMP1	361	**2nd**	**2nd**
2006	(United States) Audi Sport North America	(Italy) Rinaldo Capello (Denmark) Tom Kristensen	Audi R10 TDI	LMP1	349	**1st**	**1st**
2007	(United States) Audi Sport North America	(Italy) Rinaldo Capello (Denmark) Tom Kristensen	Audi R10 TDI	LMP1	353	4th	**2nd**
2008	(United States) Audi Sport North America	(Italy) Rinaldo Capello (Denmark) Tom Kristensen	Audi R10 TDI	LMP1	351	**3rd**	**1st**
2009	(Germany) Audi Sport Team Joest	(Italy) Rinaldo Capello (Denmark) Tom Kristensen	Audi R15 TDI	LMP1	383	**1st**	**1st**
2011	(Germany) Audi Sport Team Joest	(Italy) Rinaldo Capello (Denmark) Tom Kristensen	Audi R15 TDI plus	LMP1	327	4th	4th
2012	(Germany) Audi Sport Team Joest	(Italy) Rinaldo Capello (Denmark) Tom Kristensen	Audi R18 TDI	LMP1	325	**1st**	**1st**
2013	(Germany) Audi Sport Team Joest	(Denmark) Tom Kristensen (Brazil) Lucas di Grassi	Audi R18 e-tron quattro	P1	364	**2nd**	**2nd**

=== Complete Formula One results ===
(key)

Year	Entrant	Chassis	Engine	1	2	3	4	5	6	7	8	9	10	11	12	13	14	15	16	17	WDC	Points
2002	Panasonic Toyota Racing	Toyota TF102	Toyota RVX-02 3.0 V10	AUS; Ret	MAL; 7	BRA; Ret	SMR; Ret	ESP; 8	AUT; 9	MON; Ret	CAN; Ret	EUR; 14	GBR; Ret	FRA; 11^{†}	GER; Ret	HUN; 14	BEL; 9	ITA; Ret	USA; 15	JPN; DNS	19th	0
2003	Mild Seven Renault F1 Team	Renault R23	Renault RS23 3.0 V10	AUS; TD	MAL; TD	BRA; TD	SMR; TD	ESP; TD	AUT; TD	MON; TD	CAN; TD	EUR; TD	FRA								—	—
2003	Mild Seven Renault F1 Team	Renault R23B	Renault RS23 3.0 V10											GBR; TD	GER; TD	HUN; TD	ITA; TD	USA; TD	JPN; TD		—	—

^{†} Driver did not finish the Grand Prix, but was classified as he completed over 90% of the race distance.

=== Complete DTM results ===
(key)

Year	Team	Car	1	2	3	4	5	6	7	8	9	10	11	Pos	Points
2005	Abt Sportsline	Audi A4 DTM 2005	HOC; 11	LAU; Ret	SPA; Ret	BRN; 7	OSC; 6	NOR; 4	NÜR; 6	ZAN; Ret	LAU; 9	IST; 15	HOC; 17	10th	13

=== Complete Le Mans Series results ===
Year	Entrant	Class	Chassis	Engine	1	2	3	4	5	Rank	Points
2004	Audi Sport UK Team Veloqx	LMP1	Audi R8	Audi 3.6 L Turbo V8	MON; 2	NÜR; 1	SIL; 1	SPA; Ret		2nd	28
2005	Audi PlayStation Team Oreca	LMP1	Audi R8	Audi 3.6 L Turbo V8	SPA; 4	MON; 6	SIL; 1	NÜR; 2	IST; 2	3rd	26
2008	Audi Sport Team Joest	LMP1	Audi R10	Audi TDI 5.5 L Turbo V12 (Diesel)	CAT; 5	MON; 6	SPA; 4	NÜR; 4	SIL; 1	5th	27
2010	Audi Sport Team Joest	LMP1	Audi R15 TDI plus	Audi TDI 5.5 L Turbo V10 (Diesel)	CAS; 1	SPA; 3	ALG	HUN	SIL; Ret	9th	45
2011	Audi Sport Team Joest	LMP1	Audi R18 TDI	Audi TDI 3.7 L Turbo V6 (Diesel)	CAS	SPA; 3	IMO; 4	SIL; 7	EST	NC	0

=== Complete FIA World Endurance Championship results ===
Year	Entrant	Class	Chassis	Engine	1	2	3	4	5	6	7	8	Rank	Points
2012	Audi Sport Team Joest	LMP1	Audi R18 e-tron quattro	Audi TDI 3.7L Turbo V6 (Hybrid Diesel)	SEB; 1	**SPA**; 3	LMS; 2	SIL; 3	SÃO; 3	**BHR**; 2	FUJ; 3	SHA; 2	2nd	159
2013	Audi Sport Team Joest	LMP1	Audi R18 e-tron quattro	Audi TDI 3.7L Turbo V6 (Hybrid Diesel)	SIL; 1	SPA; 2	**LMS**; 1	SÃO; 2	**COA**; 1	FUJ; 2	SHA; 3	BHR; Ret	1st	162

Sporting positions
Preceded by Michele Alboreto; Stefan Johansson; Tom Kristensen	Winner of the 24 Hours of Le Mans; 1998; With: Laurent Aïello & Stéphane Ortelli	Succeeded by Pierluigi Martini; Yannick Dalmas; Joachim Winkelhock
Preceded by Elliott Forbes-Robinson	American Le Mans Series; Champion; 2000	Succeeded by Emanuele Pirro
Preceded by Frank Biela; Emanuele Pirro	American Le Mans Series; Champion; 2006–2007; With: Rinaldo Capello	Succeeded by Lucas Luhr; Marco Werner
Preceded by Frank Biela; Emanuele Pirro; Marco Werner	Winner of the 24 Hours of Le Mans; 2008; With: Rinaldo Capello & Tom Kristensen	Succeeded by David Brabham; Marc Gené; Alexander Wurz
Preceded by André Lotterer; Benoît Tréluyer; Marcel Fässler	Winner of the 24 Hours of Le Mans; 2013; With: Tom Kristensen & Loïc Duval	Succeeded by André Lotterer; Benoît Tréluyer; Marcel Fässler
Preceded by André Lotterer; Benoît Tréluyer; Marcel Fässler	FIA World Endurance Champion; 2013; With: Tom Kristensen & Loïc Duval	Succeeded by Sébastien Buemi; Anthony Davidson
Awards
Preceded by Eddie Irvine	Autosport; British Club Driver of the Year; 1988	Succeeded by David Coulthard
Preceded by JJ Lehto	Autosport; National Racing Driver of the Year; 1989	Succeeded by Robb Gravett
Preceded by Lewis Hamilton	Autosport; British Competition Driver of the Year; 2008	Succeeded by Jenson Button
Preceded by Lewis Hamilton	Segrave Trophy; 2008	Succeeded by Paul Bonhomme
