= 2021 French Grand Prix =

7th round of the 2021 Formula One season

Race 7 of 22 (Note: At the time of the event Formula One planned to hold twenty-three Grands Prix. At the time of the race this was subject to the replacement of the cancelled Singapore Grand Prix. The gap in the calendar was later filled by the previously-postponed Turkish Grand Prix.) in the 2021 Formula One World Championship
← Previous race	Next race →
- Layout of the Circuit Paul Ricard in 2021.

Race details
- Date: 20 June 2021
- Official name: Formula 1 Emirates Grand Prix de France 2021
- Location: Circuit Paul Ricard; Le Castellet, Var, Provence-Alpes-Côte d'Azur, France
- Course: Permanent racing circuit
- Course length: 5.842 km (3.630 miles)
- Distance: 53 laps, 309.690 km (192.432 miles)
- Weather: Windy and partly cloudy. Ambient temperature: 24 to 27 °C (75 to 81 °F); Surface temperature: 33 to 38 °C (91 to 100 °F)
- Attendance: 15,000

Pole position
Driver	(Netherlands) Max Verstappen	Red Bull Racing-Honda
- Time: 1:29.990

Fastest lap
Driver	(Netherlands) Max Verstappen	Red Bull Racing-Honda
- Time: 1:36.404 on lap 35

Podium
First	(Netherlands) Max Verstappen	Red Bull Racing-Honda
Second	(United Kingdom) Lewis Hamilton	Mercedes
Third	(Mexico) Sergio Pérez	Red Bull Racing-Honda

The 2021 French Grand Prix (officially known as the Formula 1 Emirates Grand Prix de France 2021) was a Formula One motor race which took place on 20 June 2021 at the Circuit Paul Ricard in Le Castellet, Var. (Note: Var is a department of Provence-Alpes-Côte d'Azur in the south-east of Metropolitan France.) The 53-lap race was the seventh round of the 2021 Formula One World Championship. It was the 61st time the French Grand Prix had been included as a round of the world championship since the inception of the series in 1950.

Red Bull Racing driver Max Verstappen qualified on pole position, ahead of the Mercedes team's cars of Lewis Hamilton and Valtteri Bottas. A mistake by Verstappen at the start handed Hamilton the early lead, but Verstappen regained the lead following the first round of pit stops. The Red Bull team agreed to use an alternative strategy, bringing Verstappen in for a second pit stop and dropping Verstappen eighteen seconds behind Hamilton, who reassumed first place. Verstappen (who had also claimed the bonus point for fastest lap) went on to win the race after he overtook Hamilton on the penultimate lap, with the newer tyres enabling his car to go faster. Verstappen's teammate Sergio Pérez overtook Bottas late in the race to claim third place. The result allowed Red Bull and Verstappen to extend their respective leads in the Constructors' and Drivers' Championships over Mercedes and Hamilton.

McLaren drivers Lando Norris and Daniel Ricciardo improved upon their starting positions to finish fifth and sixth. This allowed the team to move up into third in the Constructors' Championship standings, passing Scuderia Ferrari, whose drivers both finished outside of the top ten points-scoring positions following issues with tyre wear. Scuderia AlphaTauri driver Pierre Gasly, Alpine F1 Team driver Fernando Alonso, and the two Aston Martins of Sebastian Vettel and Lance Stroll made up the rest of the top ten finishers. There were no retirements.

== Background ==
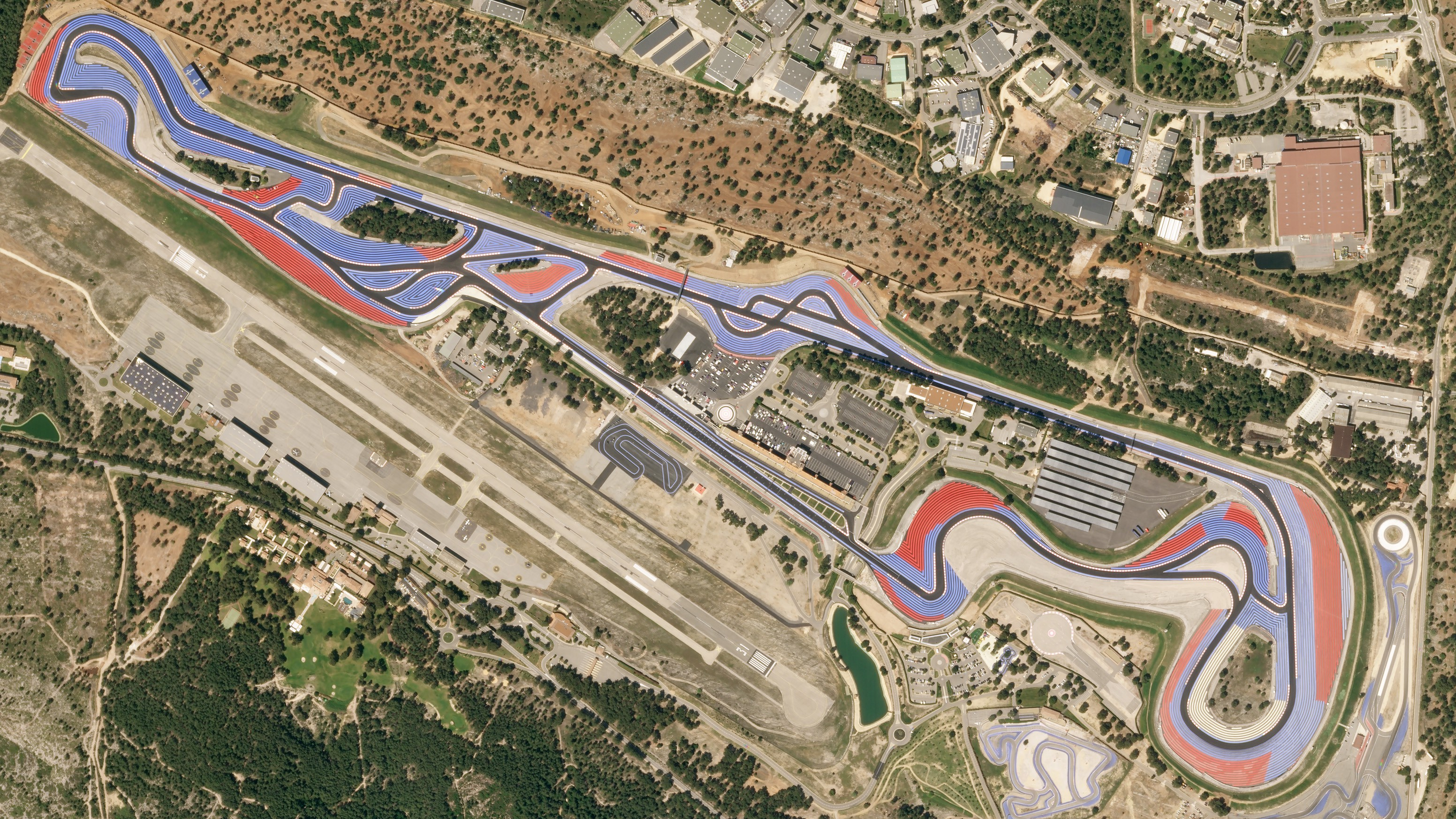
A satellite image of the Circuit Paul Ricard in 2018

The event, officially known as the Formula 1 Emirates Grand Prix de France 2021, took place at the Circuit Paul Ricard in Le Castellet, Var on the weekend of 18–20 June. The French Grand Prix returned to the calendar during the 2021 Formula One World Championship after the 2020 edition was cancelled because of the COVID-19 pandemic; this was its 61st appearance on the world championship schedule, and the 89th edition overall. It was the seventeenth Grand Prix held at Le Castellet, one of sixteen different venues which have hosted the race since the 1906 French Grand Prix, seven of which have hosted world championship races. The 1971 French Grand Prix was the first to be held at Le Castellet.

The race had originally been slated for 27 June, but was ultimately rescheduled to 20 June following the cancellation of the Canadian Grand Prix and the postponement of the Turkish Grand Prix. As a result of these changes, the French Grand Prix formed the first of three races on consecutive weekends, with the next two taking place at the Red Bull Ring in Spielberg, Austria. The addition of a fourth group of three back-to-back races to the already-crowded calendar received criticism, with concerns expressed over the workload and its effect on the mental health of workers who travel to the races. There were two people who worked at the event who tested positive for COVID-19 during the course of race week.

Attendance was capped at 15,000 spectators per day because of the COVID-19 pandemic in France. The large size of the venue allowed for social distancing measures to be put in place, allowing more spectators than other events in France during the pandemic. It had been planned that Romain Grosjean, who had suffered injuries at the 2020 Bahrain Grand Prix, would make a demonstration run for the Mercedes team at the event, and then test for them on the Tuesday after. The former was cancelled because the rescheduled race clashed with his Indycar Series commitments at Road America in Elkhart Lake, Wisconsin; while the latter was postponed due to unfavourable quarantine requirements.

The 5.842-kilometre (3.630 mi) circuit had been recently resurfaced and has fifteen corners, some of which had been reprofiled since the 2019 French Grand Prix. Changes were also made to the pit lane entrance. There were two drag reduction system zones; one located on the start-finish straight and the other between the seventh and eighth turns, on the first half of the Mistral Straight. The track is lined with large paved run-off areas. The fast middle sector followed by the curvaceous final sector means tyres can wear out quickly at Le Castellet, particularly in hot weather. The FIA Formula Three Championship and the Renault Clio Cup held support races during the weekend.

Sole Formula One tyre supplier Pirelli brought the middle range of compounds in terms of hardness (the "hard" C2, "medium" C3, and "soft" C4) with the smooth tarmac at the circuit not expected to excessively wear the tyres. Following high-speed tyre failures for both Lance Stroll and Max Verstappen at the 2021 Azerbaijan Grand Prix two weeks earlier, questions had been put to Pirelli about the safety of their tyres. Pirelli's investigation into the incidents concluded that neither they nor debris on the track were responsible for the failures; rather, they concluded that "the running condition of the tyre" was to blame. The FIA, the sport's governing body, instituted new protocols for checking tyres to ensure that similar incidents would not happen again. The intention was to stop teams from running tyres at below the prescribed minimum pressure, which had been raised by fourteen kilopascals (2 psi). New scrutineering tests would also be introduced checking the flexibility of the rear wings of cars.

Ten constructors entered two drivers each for the race, all of whom had previously raced at Le Castellet, with no changes from the season entry list. Roy Nissany drove for Williams in the first free practice session in place of George Russell. The event was Jost Capito's first Grand Prix as the team principal of Williams. The Red Bull Racing and Scuderia AlphaTauri cars received new Honda engines at this event. Red Bull entered the event with a shortage of spare parts following Verstappen's crash in Baku. McLaren and Scuderia Ferrari both made aerodynamic changes to their cars ahead of the event. The Aston Martin team chose to display the logos of the queer-inclusivity organisation Racing Pride, a long-term partner, on their cars to mark pride month. Branding relating to tobacco company Philip Morris (which had featured on Ferrari's cars at previous races in the season) was removed, starting from this Grand Prix, for the remaining European rounds of the championship. (Note: The "Mission Winnow" logos had been a source of controversy, with Phillip Morris saying they were intended to promote "less harmful alternatives to cigarettes", while health campaigners said that the branding was a means of skirting nicotine marketing laws. The logo was previously removed at some rounds of the 2019 season, including the French Grand Prix, and throughout the 2020 season.) McLaren used the name of late shareholder Mansour Ojjeh on the side of the cars as a tribute.

Mercedes were the dominant team in the previous two races held at Le Castellet since the venue's return in 2018, with Verstappen expecting his rivals to be stronger than they were at the previous two races in Monaco and Azerbaijan. Ferrari driver Charles Leclerc had taken pole position at those two events, but team principal Mattia Binotto noted that those tracks were outliers in the schedule, being unusually suited to his team's car. Mercedes team principal Toto Wolff said he hoped new directives on tyre usage would create greater equity between teams. McLaren driver Daniel Ricciardo expressed optimism for the race, believing that the track layout would help him adapt to driving for a new team after he was significantly slower than his teammate Lando Norris at the previous two rounds. Ricciardo described Le Castellet as "a much more conventional and forgiving track than Baku that also comes with slightly fewer risks." Haas Formula team principal Guenther Steiner said that reports of rancour between his team's drivers were exaggerated.

Before the race, Verstappen led the Driver's Championship with 105 points, four points ahead of Mercedes driver Lewis Hamilton. They were followed by Sergio Pérez on 69 points, three points ahead of Norris in fourth. In the Constructors' Championship, Red Bull led with 174 points, holding a 26-point lead over Mercedes; Ferrari was third with 94 points and McLaren was fourth, two points further back. Prior to this race Mercedes and Red Bull had both won three races each in 2021, with Hamilton having won three times, Verstappen twice, and Pérez once.

== Free practice ==
A trio of one-hour long free practice sessions took place, two on Friday and one on Saturday before qualifying. Mercedes driver Valtteri Bottas was fastest in first practice, ahead of Hamilton and Verstappen. Aston Martin driver Sebastian Vettel made contact with a wall during the session, but was able to return his car to the pit lane. The front wing of Bottas's car was damaged when he hit a kerb, prompting Mercedes to lodge a complaint about its location, with sporting director Ron Meadows calling the kerbs "too aggressive". Ex-driver and BBC Sport pundit Jolyon Palmer argued that the fact they caused minor damage helped to enforce track limits, and that it is what fans wanted. Mick Schumacher's car was also damaged in an incident; the Haas driver lost control of his car and tagged a wall. Ferrari driver Carlos Sainz Jr's tyres were damaged by the abrasive run-off area after he went off the track. Verstappen noted the challenge that unpredictable gusts of wind in the area posed to drivers.

In the second free practice session Verstappen set the fastest time, 0.008 seconds ahead of Bottas. Verstappen had been dissatisfied with his car's front axle in the first free practice session, and the Red Bull team made changes to the set up before the start of the second session. The front wing on Verstappen's car was damaged when he hit a kerb, prompting Red Bull to lodge a complaint about its location. A virtual safety car period was called, with drivers required to slow down so marshals could safely recover the debris, which Red Bull wanted returned to them. Teams raised concerns about the financial cost of cars being damaged following the introduction of rules restricting their spending for the 2021 season. Red Bull manager Jonathan Wheatley and Mercedes director Meadows both estimated that hitting a kerb could cause as much as £100,000 sterling in damage, whilst Steiner had instructed his drivers to take care to avoid hitting the kerbs, as any damage could eat into Haas's small budget. Wheatley described the potential damage from kerb strikes as "such a huge penalty for a minor indiscretion on the drivers' part." Michael Masi (Formula One's race director) noted that teams have requested measures such as kerbs to be put in place to stop drivers from gaining an advantage by leaving the track. The kerbs were the same as they were in 2019, but the new, smoother tarmac allowed teams to use stiffer suspension and for drivers to pilot their cars through corners faster. Unlike some other tracks, the kerbs at Le Castellet were positioned perpendicularly to the direction of travel, increasing the force of impacts.

In the final free practice session Verstappen was once again fastest ahead of Bottas, with Sainz third fastest. Verstappen was over seven-tenths of a second faster than Bottas. Starting from the third session, lap times were deleted if drivers left the track at the exit of the sixth corner. The FIA investigated issues regarding kerbing and decided against making changes before the session.

== Qualifying ==
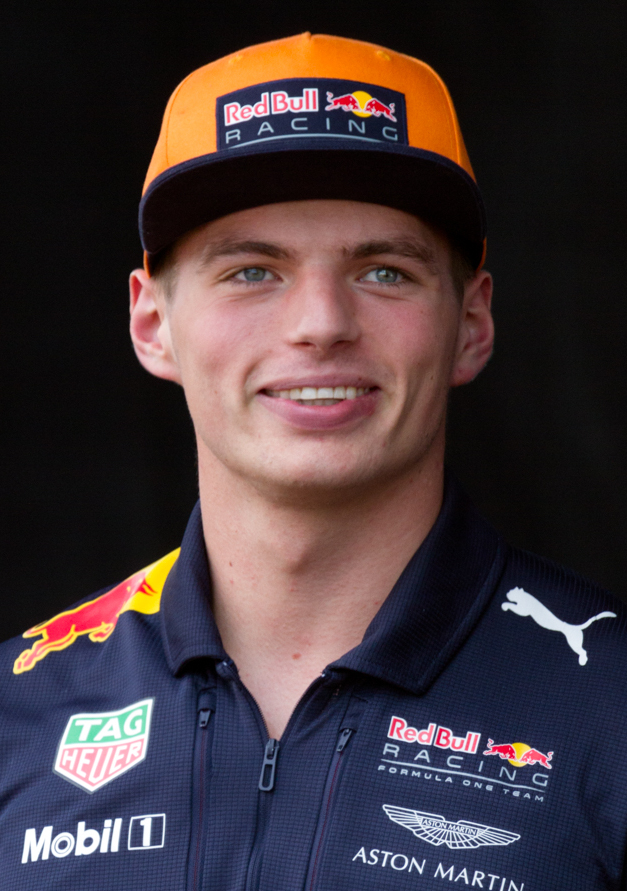
Max Verstappen (pictured in 2017) qualified on pole position for Red Bull Racing.

Qualifying started at 15:00 local time on the Saturday, in dry conditions with ambient temperatures of 28–30 °C (82–86 °F) and surface temperatures of 41–46 °C (106–115 °F). Qualifying consisted of three sessions, (Note: The sessions are eighteen, fifteen and twelve minutes in length respectively.) with the slowest five drivers having their qualifying positions set after each of the first two sessions. The first part of qualifying (Q1) was paused after AlphaTauri driver Yuki Tsunoda lost control of his car and hit a barrier, and then stopped with half a minute remaining on the clock when Schumacher crashed. His crash prevented some other drivers from having an opportunity to set a faster lap than him, allowing him to qualify fifteenth, the best result of his career up to that point. Stroll, who had had a lap time deleted after he went off the track at the sixth turn, was unable to set a representative lap time because of the premature conclusion to the session. Kimi Räikkönen and Nicholas Latifi were also unable to complete their final runs; Latifi qualified sixteenth with a time 0.002 seconds slower than his Williams teammate, Russell, in fifteenth. Nikita Mazepin qualified eighteenth after he was unable to keep pace with Haas teammate Schumacher. Verstappen set the fastest lap of the first session, with a time of 91.001 seconds. Following his crash, Tsunoda said that he would take a more cautious approach at the start of future qualifying sessions.

Bottas's 90.735-second lap time was the fastest in the second session (Q2), where most drivers set their times on the medium tyres, with soft tyres only giving a small speed advantage over the medium compound. Russell used the soft tyres for his first run, before improving on the mediums on his second run, while Alfa Romeo Racing driver Antonio Giovinazzi changed to the softs to beat Russell to thirteenth. Alpine F1 Team driver Esteban Ocon was unable to replicate his pace in Q1 during this session and qualified eleventh. Vettel similarly found himself slower in Q2, qualifying twelfth. Norris had to abandon his final run because his car was running out of fuel, but his earlier time was sufficient to allow him to progress to the final segment. Schumacher's Q1 crash meant his Haas was too badly damaged to participate in Q2, although the team were able to repair the damage before the race without incurring penalties.

Verstappen set the fastest time of the final segment (Q3) to claim pole position ahead of Hamilton. While Hamilton set the fastest time through the first sector, Verstappen was quickest through the second and third, and set a time a quarter of a second faster than his rival. The soft tyres used in Q3 were prone to overheating through the final sector, and the Red Bull car's better ability to handle this problem gave them an advantage over Mercedes. Verstappen was also the only driver to set a time under ninety seconds, with an average speed of 233.7 kilometres per hour (145.2 mph) for a time of 89.990 seconds. This was the fifth pole of Verstappen's career and the first for Red Bull at the French Grand Prix. It was Verstappen's first pole position since the opening round of the 2021 season at the Sakhir circuit in Bahrain. Hamilton was glad, as he felt the result disproved claims that a chassis swap with teammate Bottas was negatively affecting his performance. Hamilton also noted that numerous set-up changes had been made to the car since the beginning of free-practice, describing it as a "tricky weekend". Bottas and Pérez qualified third and fourth, with Mercedes boss Wolff feeling that his team's cars were not the fastest. The Mercedes cars were slower in a straight line than the Red Bull cars, with Wolff saying that they could not gain straight-line performance without losing more time in corners. The two constructors had differing design philosophies, with the higher rake of the Red Bull allowing them to use a smaller rear wing than Mercedes. Pérez hit a kerb during his final attempt, which slowed him down.

Sainz qualified fifth and Leclerc seventh, with both Ferrari drivers reporting difficulties keeping the front tyres of their cars to a suitable temperature. AlphaTauri driver Pierre Gasly qualified sixth after changes were made to his car before qualifying. Fernando Alonso qualified ninth, sandwiched by the McLarens of Norris and Ricciardo; Alpine had ranked higher in free practice, but Alonso felt their qualifying performance was representative.

=== Qualifying classification ===
Pos.	No.	Driver	Constructor	Qualifying times			Final grid
Pos.	No.	Driver	Constructor	Q1	Q2	Q3	Final grid
1	33	(Netherlands) Max Verstappen	Red Bull Racing-Honda	1:31.001	1:31.080	1:29.990	1
2	44	(United Kingdom) Lewis Hamilton	Mercedes	1:31.237	1:30.778	1:30.248	2
3	77	(Finland) Valtteri Bottas	Mercedes	1:31.669	1:30.735	1:30.376	3
4	11	(Mexico) Sergio Pérez	Red Bull Racing-Honda	1:31.560	1:30.971	1:30.445	4
5	55	(Spain) Carlos Sainz Jr.	Ferrari	1:32.079	1:31.146	1:30.840	5
6	10	(France) Pierre Gasly	AlphaTauri-Honda	1:31.898	1:31.353	1:30.868	6
7	16	(Monaco) Charles Leclerc	Ferrari	1:32.209	1:31.567	1:30.987	7
8	4	(United Kingdom) Lando Norris	McLaren-Mercedes	1:31.733	1:31.542	1:31.252	8
9	14	(Spain) Fernando Alonso	Alpine-Renault	1:32.158	1:31.549	1:31.340	9
10	3	(Australia) Daniel Ricciardo	McLaren-Mercedes	1:32.181	1:31.615	1:31.382	10
11	31	(France) Esteban Ocon	Alpine-Renault	1:32.139	1:31.736	N/A	11
12	5	(Germany) Sebastian Vettel	Aston Martin-Mercedes	1:32.132	1:31.767	N/A	12
13	99	(Italy) Antonio Giovinazzi	Alfa Romeo Racing-Ferrari	1:32.722	1:31.813	N/A	13
14	63	(United Kingdom) George Russell	Williams-Mercedes	1:33.060	1:32.065	N/A	14
15	47	(Germany) Mick Schumacher	Haas-Ferrari	1:32.942	No time	N/A	15
16	6	(Canada) Nicholas Latifi	Williams-Mercedes	1:33.062	N/A	N/A	16
17	7	(Finland) Kimi Räikkönen	Alfa Romeo Racing-Ferrari	1:33.354	N/A	N/A	17
18	9	(Russian Automobile Federation) Nikita Mazepin (Note: Nikita Mazepin is Russian, but he competed as a neutral competitor using the designation RAF (Russian Automobile Federation), as the Court of Arbitration for Sport upheld a ban on Russia competing at World Championships. The ban was implemented by the World Anti-Doping Agency in response to the state-sponsored doping program of Russian athletes.)	Haas-Ferrari	1:33.554	N/A	N/A	18
107% time: 1:37.371
—	18	(Canada) Lance Stroll	Aston Martin-Mercedes	2:12.584	N/A	N/A	19^{1}
—	22	(Japan) Yuki Tsunoda	AlphaTauri-Honda	No time	N/A	N/A	PL^{2}

==== Notes ====
- ^1 – Lance Stroll failed to set a time within the 107% requirement, but was permitted to race at the stewards' discretion.
- ^2 – Yuki Tsunoda failed to set a time during qualifying, but was permitted to race at the stewards' discretion. He received a five-place grid penalty for an unscheduled gearbox change. This made no difference as he was already due to start from last place. He was then required to start the race from the pit lane for a floor and suspension setup change in parc fermé.

== Race ==
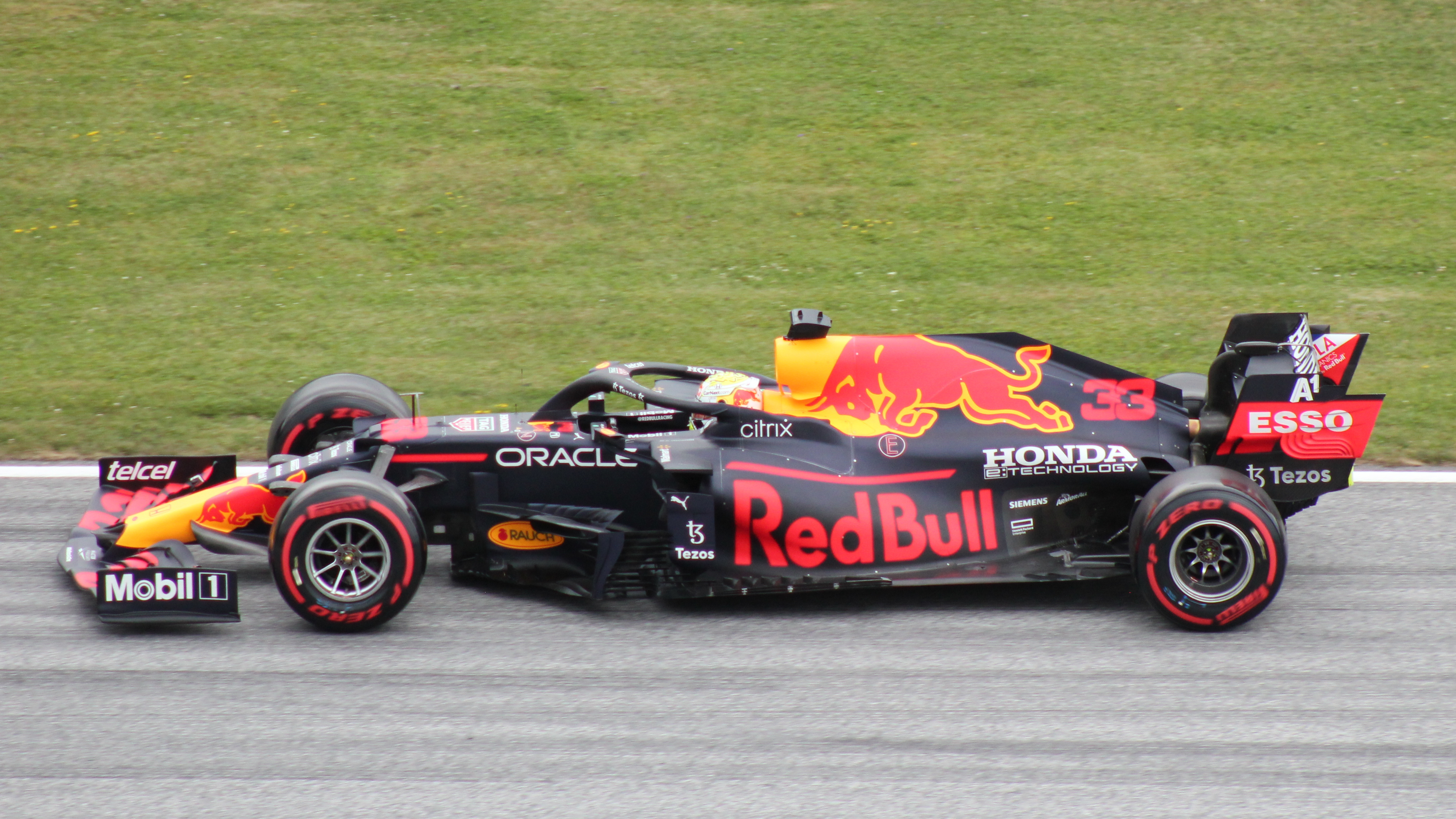
Max Verstappen won the race for Red Bull Racing, beginning a streak of three consecutive race wins for him, and forming the third of five consecutive wins for Red Bull.

The race started at 15:00 local time on Sunday 20 June, running for 53 laps over a distance of 309.690 kilometres (192.432 mi). (Note: The fewest number of laps to exceed 305 kilometres (190 mi).) Tsunoda started the race from the pit lane because damaged parts of his car had been replaced after qualifying. Most of the field opted to start on the medium tyres, with six choosing the hard tyres. The weather was cooler for the race than it was for the free and qualifying practice sessions, with an ambient temperature between 24 and 27 °C (75 and 81 °F) and a track surface temperature between 33 and 38 °C (91 and 100 °F). It had rained on the morning of the race, removing rubber from the track and thus changing the driving conditions. The tarmac was rougher than it had been before, increasing the rate at which tyres would become worn out and lose grip. While cloud cover remained, the track had dried and it did not rain during the race. Conditions were also humid.

Pole-sitter Verstappen made an error on the first lap, and was overtaken by Hamilton. The 2016 Formula One world champion Nico Rosberg said that the error may have occurred because Verstappen "took a bit of unnecessary risk" in the 40-kilometre-per-hour (25 mph) tailwinds. Verstappen said that he "lost the rear" of the car, and had trouble regaining control. Norris lost positions at the start, dropping behind Alonso and Ricciardo before briefly going off track at the tenth corner. Problems shifting from second to third gear meant his McLaren was slow to get away. The top three pulled away from fourth-placed Pérez as Sainz attempted to get past him. Russell and Schumacher were passed by Latifi, Räikkönen, Stroll, and Tsunoda early in the race. Vettel overtook Ocon on the second lap.

Hamilton built a lead of more than a second to Verstappen over the first couple of laps, meaning Verstappen could not use the drag reduction system when it was activated. Tsunoda got ahead of Latifi on the fourth lap. Mazepin overtook Schumacher on the fourth lap, with Schumacher displeased by his teammate's conduct in executing the pass. Alonso lost three places on the eleventh and twelfth laps when Ricciardo, Norris, and Vettel overtook him, demoting him to eleventh place. Russell passed Latifi on the twelfth lap. Stroll gained six positions over the course of the first fourteen laps.

On the fourteenth lap Leclerc became the first driver to pull into the pit lane for new tyres, beginning the initial round of pit stops. Leclerc's stop came after Ricciardo had passed him on track. Tsunoda and Schumacher echoed Leclerc by making their pit stops a lap later. Ricciardo came in for his tyre change on the sixteenth lap, which helped him get ahead of Gasly, who changed tyres one lap later. Sainz and Russell also pitted on the seventeenth lap. Alonso made a pit stop on the eighteenth lap to allow his teammate Ocon (who was running long after starting on hard tyres) clear air, with Latifi also pitting on that lap. Amongst those who had stayed out, Stroll overtook Ocon on the nineteenth lap.

Mercedes called Bottas in for a pit stop on the seventeenth lap, with Red Bull doing the same for Verstappen on the eighteenth lap and Hamilton coming in on the nineteenth. Bottas's tyres needed to be changed because they had formed a flat spot. Bottas was over a second closer after Verstappen emerged from the pit lane. Verstappen had preserved his tyres while running behind Hamilton, and he was able to make up time immediately before his pitstop as a result. Hamilton emerged from the pit lane behind Verstappen, who used the additional traction provided by the new tyres to overturn a three-second deficit. With the advantage of fresh tyres established, Hamilton was keen to beat Verstappen to making a second stop once the end of the race was close enough. Verstappen said that the new tyres performed particularly well on the first lap after the pit stop.

Verstappen took the lead when Pérez made his pit stop on the 24th lap. Pérez was not as fast as Verstappen or the Mercedes drivers in the windy weather, but was able to manage his tyre wear well. Norris also pitted for his only tyre change on the 24th lap; he emerged from his pit stop in fourteenth position, but had a tyre advantage. Räikkönen and Ocon both found themselves rapidly dispatched by Ricciardo, Sainz, and Gasly, who had already made their pit stops.

On the 28th lap Vettel lost a significant amount of time when his car was blown off the track by strong winds. Ocon made his pit stop for new tyres on that lap, as did Giovinazzi. while Leclerc allowed his Ferrari teammate Sainz past to avoid holding him up. Norris tried to overtake Gasly on the 28th lap, but Gasly's defence led to both drivers going off the circuit, leaving Norris frustrated. Gasly felt he had raced Norris fairly, and noted that the wind and high tyre wear made his car difficult to drive. Norris then overtook Gasly on the following lap, then moved ahead of Leclerc and Sainz in quick succession. Gasly got past Leclerc on the 30th lap, with Alonso doing the same one lap later.

Verstappen made a second stop for new tyres on the 32nd lap, while Hamilton continued without stopping again. Verstappen emerged from the pit lane eighteen seconds behind Hamilton. The new tyres gave Verstappen a significant speed advantage. Mercedes had used a comparable strategy at the 2021 Spanish Grand Prix, but on that occasion the circumstances were more favourable to the team making the second pit stop. Verstappen was unsure whether making the extra stop was the correct decision, although a problem with his two-way radio meant he would not have been able to protest. Pérez allowed his teammate past on the 35th lap to pursue the Mercedes duo, who had inherited the top two positions. Pérez's presence posed an issue for the Mercedes drivers, as making another pit stop would mean having to get back past him. Räikkönen made his pit stop on the 33rd lap.

Aston Martin started both of their drivers on hard tyres and waited until the 34th lap for Stroll's only pit stop and the 37th for Vettel's stop, which allowed both drivers to move up into the top ten. Stroll's stop came after the earlier-stopping Norris had passed him on track. Aston Martin and Vettel had also found an advantage by pitting late at the preceding rounds in Monaco and Azerbaijan. Vettel's pit stop was not the fastest, and he felt that if it were quicker he could have gained positions. Norris passed his teammate Ricciardo on the 33rd lap, with the former proving stronger during the second stint on hard tyres. Gasly claimed seventh position after he passed Sainz on the 36th lap. Alonso also passed Sainz on the following lap. Tyre wear meant Leclerc had to pit again on the 38th lap, dropping him to sixteenth place. Leclerc and Verstappen were the only drivers to make two pit stops, both starting on the mediums, changing to the hards, and then changing back to the mediums. Stroll passed Tsunoda for eleventh place on the 42nd lap, then Vettel overtook Sainz for ninth place on the 44th lap.

Verstappen caught Bottas by the 44th lap, and passed him when he made a mistake. Verstappen was able to make the overtake without losing much time to Hamilton ahead. Bottas was unhappy with the Mercedes team's decision to only make one pit stop for new tyres. The disagreement between Bottas and the team came at a time of uncertainty over whether he would be driving there in 2022, although Bottas said that his frustrations over the strategy were not related to this. With five laps remaining Verstappen started to catch Hamilton rapidly, as the tyres on the Mercedes had become very worn out. Verstappen eventually overtook Hamilton on the penultimate lap. Rosberg expressed surprise that Hamilton did not do more to prevent Verstappen from passing him. Hamilton did not want to drive onto the dirty part of the track to defend from Verstappen, who was able to use the drag reduction system to go much faster down the straight.

Verstappen went on to take his thirteenth Grand Prix victory ahead of Hamilton. He also claimed the additional point for setting the fastest lap time of the race, setting a time of 96.404 seconds at an average of 218 kilometres per hour (135 mph). This was the first time Red Bull had won three consecutive Grands Prix since the 2013 season. Verstappen went on to win the following two Grands Prix at Spielberg, becoming the first driver to win three rounds of the world championship on consecutive weekends. This was the third of ten races that were won by the eventual Drivers' Champion in 2021. Hamilton said that his tyres were badly worn by the race's conclusion, and that Red Bull "had a good strategy". This was the 170th time Hamilton had finished on the podium at a World Championship Grand Prix. Red Bull team principal Christian Horner described the result as "a little bit of payback for Barcelona earlier in the year", in reference to the strategy Mercedes had used to win there. Horner believed that winning at a track where Mercedes had previously been dominant was a positive sign for his team. Wolff believed that Mercedes were faster than Red Bull, but did not have the superior strategy.

Pérez came third after overtaking Bottas on the 49th lap. Pérez was investigated for leaving the track after making the pass, but it was ruled that he had not gained an advantage and he was not penalised. Mercedes could have made an additional pit stop to change Bottas onto fresh tyres and pursue the additional point for setting the fastest lap, but decided not to in case Pérez received a time penalty. The result extended Red Bull's and Verstappen's respective leads in the Constructors' and Drivers' championship standings. The top three drivers were interviewed by Martin Brundle before progressing to the podium to collect their trophies, which took the form of gorilla statuettes designed by sculptor Richard Orlinski.

McLaren were more competitive during the race than they were in qualifying. Norris made numerous overtakes to claim fifth place, 50 seconds behind Bottas. He also measured the highest top speed through the speed trap, being measured at 349 kilometres per hour (217 mph). His teammate Ricciardo followed him in sixth, moving McLaren up to third in the Constructors' Championship standings, with McLaren being informally described as "the best of the rest" for the race. Gasly felt he had maximised his AlphaTauri's potential, as he remained within one second of Ricciardo (close enough for him to use the drag reduction system) en route to a seventh-place finish.

Alonso passed both Ferrari drivers after his pit stop to finish eighth. Senior Alpine figure Alain Prost felt Alonso was adapting well after returning from a sabbatical, and that he might have finished in a higher position if his pit stop had been quicker. Vettel finished ninth while his teammate Stroll gained nine positions to claim the final point in tenth, having passed Sainz on the 48th lap. Tyre wear for other drivers allowed Stroll to get ahead. Aston Martin boss Otmar Szafnauer felt his team's performance showed they had not been negatively affected by the new protocols on tyre usage.

Both Ferrari drivers failed to score. Their cars experienced severe tyre wear compared with their competitors. Sainz, who finished eleventh, said that the team needed to work out why their car was harder on its front tyres than those of rivals, while Binotto said that rectifying the issues (which were exacerbated by fast turns and warm weather) would mean making fundamental changes to the car which the regulations would not allow. Ferrari had been relatively competitive on the medium tyres in the first stint, but lost a lot of pace compared to their rivals when they changed to the hards. This was the first time Ferrari had failed to score in 2021. Following the result, the team made efforts to rectify the tyre-wear issue, concluding that the car setups they were using had caused wear-inducing understeer.

Russell finished twelfth, allowing Williams to move ahead of Haas for ninth in the Constructors' Championship standings. Tsunoda finished thirteenth after Russell overtook him on the third-to-last lap. Ocon finished fourteenth after struggling with tyre wear. The Alpine driver overtook Latifi on the 31st lap, before getting stuck behind Russell and Tsunoda. This came during a run of races in which Ocon failed to score points, which concluded after his chassis was replaced with a new one. Giovinazzi finished fifteenth after his pit stop strategy dropped him behind Russell.

Räikkönen finished seventeenth after an attempt to pass Leclerc on the penultimate lap ended in minor contact. Alfa Romeo failed to score after doing so at the previous two Grands Prix. Latifi finished eighteenth after he could not keep his tyres warm enough, only finding grip in the closing stages of the race. The Williams driver was passed by Giovinazzi on the 32nd lap and by Räikkönen on the 39th. The Haas drivers brought up the rear, with the earlier stopping Schumacher getting back ahead of Mazepin when the latter made his pit stop on the 31st lap. Following the race the team discovered that Schumacher's seat was aligned asymmetrically. All drivers finished the race, for the tenth time since the inception of the world championship in 1950 and for the sixth time since the 2014 season.

=== Race classification ===
Pos.	No.	Driver	Constructor	Laps	Time/Retired	Grid	Points
1	33	(Netherlands) Max Verstappen	Red Bull Racing-Honda	53	1:27:25.770	1	26^{1}
2	44	(United Kingdom) Lewis Hamilton	Mercedes	53	+2.904	2	18
3	11	(Mexico) Sergio Pérez	Red Bull Racing-Honda	53	+8.811	4	15
4	77	(Finland) Valtteri Bottas	Mercedes	53	+14.618	3	12
5	4	(United Kingdom) Lando Norris	McLaren-Mercedes	53	+1:04.032	8	10
6	3	(Australia) Daniel Ricciardo	McLaren-Mercedes	53	+1:15.857	10	8
7	10	(France) Pierre Gasly	AlphaTauri-Honda	53	+1:16.596	6	6
8	14	(Spain) Fernando Alonso	Alpine-Renault	53	+1:17.695	9	4
9	5	(Germany) Sebastian Vettel	Aston Martin-Mercedes	53	+1:19.666	12	2
10	18	(Canada) Lance Stroll	Aston Martin-Mercedes	53	+1:31.946	19	1
11	55	(Spain) Carlos Sainz Jr.	Ferrari	53	+1:39.337	5	
12	63	(United Kingdom) George Russell	Williams-Mercedes	52	+1 lap	14	
13	22	(Japan) Yuki Tsunoda	AlphaTauri-Honda	52	+1 lap	PL	
14	31	(France) Esteban Ocon	Alpine-Renault	52	+1 lap	11	
15	99	(Italy) Antonio Giovinazzi	Alfa Romeo Racing-Ferrari	52	+1 lap	13	
16	16	(Monaco) Charles Leclerc	Ferrari	52	+1 lap	7	
17	7	(Finland) Kimi Räikkönen	Alfa Romeo Racing-Ferrari	52	+1 lap	17	
18	6	(Canada) Nicholas Latifi	Williams-Mercedes	52	+1 lap	16	
19	47	(Germany) Mick Schumacher	Haas-Ferrari	52	+1 lap	15	
20	9	(Russian Automobile Federation) Nikita Mazepin	Haas-Ferrari	52	+1 lap	18	
Fastest lap: (Netherlands) Max Verstappen (Red Bull Racing-Honda) – 1:36.404 (lap 35)

==== Notes ====
- ^1 – Includes one point for fastest lap.

== Championship standings after the race ==
Listed below are the top-five positions in the Drivers' and Constructors' Championships following the event, with changes in position indicated:

Drivers' Championship standings

	Pos.	Driver	Points
Unchanged	1	(Netherlands) Max Verstappen	131
Unchanged	2	(United Kingdom) Lewis Hamilton	119
Unchanged	3	(Mexico) Sergio Pérez	84
Unchanged	4	(United Kingdom) Lando Norris	76
1	5	(Finland) Valtteri Bottas	59

Constructors' Championship standings

	Pos.	Constructor	Points
Unchanged	1	(Austria) Red Bull Racing-Honda	215
Unchanged	2	(Germany) Mercedes	178
1	3	(United Kingdom) McLaren-Mercedes	110
1	4	(Italy) Ferrari	94
Unchanged	5	(Italy) AlphaTauri-Honda	45

== See also ==
- 2021 Le Castellet Formula 3 round

== Notes ==
Previous race: 2021 Azerbaijan Grand Prix	FIA Formula One World Championship; 2021 season	Next race: 2021 Styrian Grand Prix
Previous race: 2019 French Grand Prix	French Grand Prix	Next race: 2022 French Grand Prix
