= Alessandro Alunni Bravi =

Team representative of Alfa Romeo F1 Team (born 1974)

- Born: 23 November 1974 (age 51); Umbertide, Italy
- Education: University of Perugia
- Occupation: Chief Business Affairs Officer
- Employer: McLaren
- Children: 1

Alessandro Alunni Bravi (born 23 November 1974) is an Italian lawyer and manager, best known for being Chief Business Affairs Officer of the McLaren Driver Development Programme since 2025. Throughout his motorsports career, Alunni Bravi held the position of Team Principal and Managing Director of Trident Racing and General Counsel of ART Grand Prix and Spark Racing Technology, amongst other ventures, as well as acted as legal counsel for over twenty years.

== Early life ==
Alunni Bravi was born in Umbertide, Italy, and grew up in Passignano sul Trasimeno, home to Coloni Motorsport, which competed in Formula One between 1987 and 1991. A racing fan since a young age, Alunni Bravi often attended events at the nearby Autodromo dell'Umbria in Magione growing up. In 1999, he graduated with Honours in Civil Law from the University of Perugia, and subsequently collaborated as Assistant Lecturer within the Law department for two years. He also worked as a journalist, collaborating with the weekly magazine Autosprint.

== Career ==
Alunni Bravi began working as legal counsel, ranging from Motorsports teams to drivers, athletes and sports event companies. Between 2002 and 2003, he took on the role of Managing Director and Team Manager at Coloni Motorsport, which competed in Formula 3000 International. In 2002, the team was runner-up in the championship, collecting four wins with drivers Giorgio Pantano and Enrico Toccacelo. Alunni Bravi then moved on to WRC Rally Italia Sardinia, where he acted as General Manager for two seasons. From 2005 to 2008, he was Team Principal and Managing Director of Trident Racing, which debuted in 2006 in the then-GP2 Series. In the following years, Alunni Bravi began a collaboration with All Road Management, as well as taking on the role of General Counsel for ART Grand Prix, Spark Racing Technology and Birel ART. In 2016, he founded his own management company, Trusted Talent Management, listing among his clients 2021–2022 Formula E World Champion, Stoffel Vandoorne, as well as Robert Kubica, Christian Lundgaard and Gianmaria Bruni.

=== Sauber Group (2017–2025) ===
From July 2017 onwards, Alunni Bravi held the positions of Board Member and General Counsel of Sauber Group. In March 2022, he was appointed Managing Director, overviewing marketing, communications, sales, legal and finance for the group of companies.

At the start of the 2023 season, Alunni Bravi was appointed to the additional position of Team Representative of Alfa Romeo F1 Team following the departure of Team Principal Frédéric Vasseur to Ferrari. This did not mean he was Team Principal, as owner Finn Rausing at the time chose Andreas Seidl as CEO for leading the transformation to Audi while opting not to appoint a Team Principal, and instead chose to appoint a Team Representative, which was tasked with running the day to day operations, which landed to Alunni Bravi.

In January 2025, Alunni Bravi departed from the team as Team Representative. As a result of his departure, Red Bull Sporting Director Jonathan Wheatley took up his new role as Team Principal earlier than expected on 1 April, instead of in the summer of 2025. In the meantime, Chief Operating and Technical Officer Mattia Binotto served as Interim Team Principal for the first 2 races in Australia and China, before Wheatley joined the team for the Japanese Grand Prix in his new role.

=== McLaren (2025–present) ===
It was announced on January 23, 2025, that Alunni Bravi would be joining McLaren as the team's new Chief Business Affairs Officer and leading the team's Driver Development Programme, taking over the role at the Driver Development Programme from Stephanie Carlin, who relinquished the position to take on further responsibilities in F1. Alunni Bravi joined the team from 1 February, the following day after his departure from Sauber.

== Personal life ==
Alunni Bravi has lived in Switzerland with his wife and son since 2011. He speaks fluent French, and English. He plays tennis in his free time. Passionate about rallies and historic cars, Alunni Bravi took part in the 2022 edition of the Mille Miglia, the annual revival of the iconic endurance race, competing alongside Italian racing driver and TV host Vicky Piria in a classic Alfa Romeo 1900 Sport Spider.
