= Football Foundation =

UK charitable organization

- Founded: 2000
- President: Thomas Pendry
- Chairman: Martin Glenn
- CEO: Robert Sullivan
- Funding Partners: Premier League, The FA and the Government (via Sport England).
- Website: footballfoundation.org.uk

The Football Foundation is the United Kingdom's largest sports charity, channelling funding from the Premier League, The FA and the government (through Sport England) into transforming the landscape of grassroots sport in England.

== History ==
Launched in 2000, the Football Foundation awards grants to grassroots clubs and organisations to help build and refurbish new and existing community sports facilities, such as changing pavilions, natural grass pitches or all-weather playing surfaces, for schools, and local authority facilities or sports clubs.

Founded in 2000, the Football Foundation is now the largest sports charity in UK. So far, the foundation has used the investment from partners to award more than 17,600 grants to improve facilities worth more than £708m – including 885 artificial grass pitches, 3,587 natural grass pitches and 1,210 changing facilities. This has attracted an additional £885m of partnership funding – totalling over £1.5bn investment in grassroots football.

Through the foundation, the Premier League, The FA and government through Sport England have come together to create the National Football Facilities Strategy (NFFS) that will guide work over the next ten years to transform many more local facilities. Local football facility plans (LFFP) are being created to identify priority projects where demand is greatest, and the impact will be strongest and help stimulate the action required to deliver them.

== Ambassadors ==
- Georgie Bingham
- Dion Dublin
- Graeme Le Saux
- Gary Neville
- John Scales
- Ben Shephard
- Gareth Southgate
- Dan Walker
- Faye White
- Lawrie McMenemy
- Nigel Adkins
- James Beattie
- Chris Powell
- Hayley McQueen
- Duncan Watmore

The late Graham Taylor also served as a Football Foundation ambassador.
