= Georgie Bingham =

British radio and television presenter

- Born: Georgina Mary Margaret Bingham; 30 September 1976 (age 49); England
- Occupations: Television and radio presenter
- Years active: 2001–present
- Employer: Talksport
- Known for: Hosting Weekend Sports Breakfast

Georgina Mary Margaret Bingham (born 30 September 1976) is a British radio and television presenter, formerly a host of the Weekend Sports Breakfast on Talksport.

== Career ==
Bingham started her career as a runner for ESPN Star Asia and Sky Sports. She did local radio stints with SGR Colchester and Ipswich (now Heart FM) and BBC Radio Suffolk. She worked for ITV Anglia from 2001 to 2004 where she anchored news, sports and local football league highlights show 'Over The Bar' with Kevin Piper.

She worked for Sky from 2004–2007 as a newsreader for Sky Sports News and Sky News. During this time, Bingham anchored a newspaper review for Fox Soccer Channel in the USA.

Bingham moved to the USA to work for ESPN in 2007. She worked predominantly for ESPN International, hosting their flagship show 'SportsCenter'. During her time at ESPN, she participated in broadcasts from Wimbledon, The Open, the US open golf and tennis, The ESPYs, and interviewed Pelé, David Beckham, Tracy McGrady, Michael Phelps, Kobe Bryant among others. She became the first British woman on ESPN in America when she hosted ESPN's first coverage of the Premier League to American audiences in 2009.

Bingham came back to the UK in 2010. In August 2013, she was named host of the Weekend Sports Breakfast on Talksport alongside the former Newcastle and Coventry striker Micky Quinn. Having joined the station in 2011 as its only female presenter, she previously hosted Sunday Exclusive, and Saturday and Sunday Scoreboards. She is also a presenter for Premier League Productions, and was a sports host for Daybreak on ITV. Since her return from the USA, she's also presented IMG's 'At the Open Live' for the R&A and 'Golfing World' a weekly Sky Sports show. She is also a regular on 5 News. In August 2012, Bingham was a key part of Channel 4's historic Paralympics coverage - anchoring the 1-6pm slot with TV newcomer Arthur Williams.

Based in London and Suffolk, Georgie Bingham is an Ipswich Town F.C. fan, and was formerly married to James Joyce.

== Family ==

Of Anglo-Irish aristocratic descent, her father Derek Bingham is heir presumptive to the hereditary peerage title of Baron Clanmorris, cadets of the Earls of Lucan. Her mother Victoria Pennant-Rea, the sister of Rupert Pennant-Rea, descends from the Barons Penrhyn.

== See also ==
- Baron Clanmorris
- Earl of Lucan
