= Andreas Seidl =

German motorsport engineer and manager (born 1976)

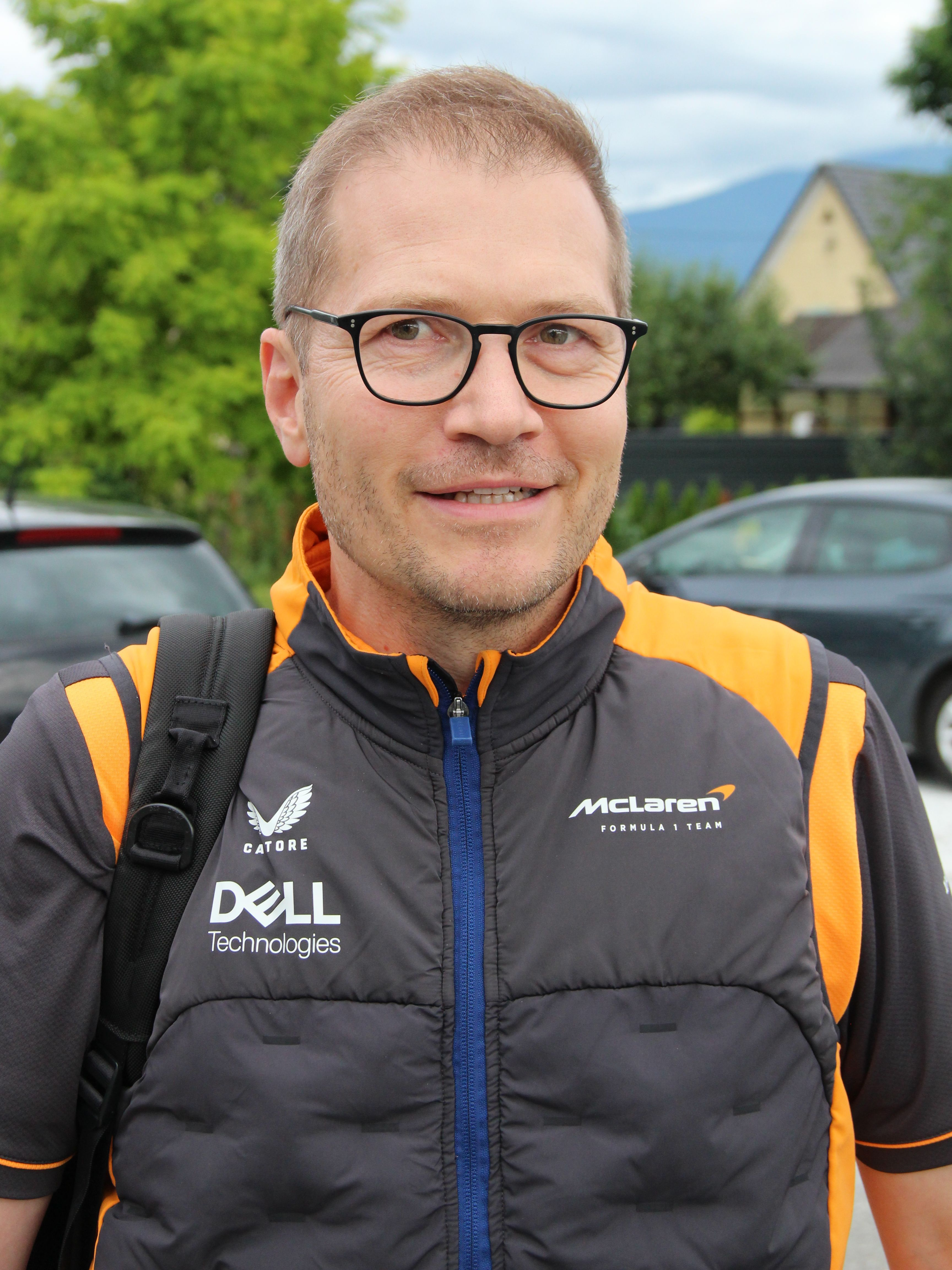
- Seidl at the 2022 Austrian Grand Prix
- Born: 6 January 1976 (age 50); Passau, West Germany
- Education: Technical University of Munich (Dip.)
- Occupation: Motorsport executive
- Years active: 2000–2024
- Employers: BMW (2000–2009); Porsche (2012–2019); McLaren (2019–2022); Sauber (2023–2024)

Andreas Seidl (born 6 January 1976) is a German motorsport engineer and manager. He was previously the chief executive officer of Sauber Motorsport, the team principal of McLaren and the team principal of the hybrid Porsche LMP1 program.

== Career ==
Seidl graduated from the Technical University of Munich with a diploma in mechanical engineering. Seidl worked in F1 for BMW between 2000 and 2009. After BMW withdrew from Formula 1, Seidl then managed BMW's DTM comeback in 2012. In 2013, Seidl joined the Porsche LMP1 squad as director of race operations and was promoted to team principal in 2014.

On 10 January 2019, McLaren appointed Seidl as team principal of their Formula 1 team. He started working with the team on 1 May 2019. On 13 December 2022, it was announced Seidl would become CEO of Sauber Motorsport in January 2023, and would leave McLaren with immediate effect.

On 8 March 2024, Seidl was announced as the CEO of Audi's Formula One operations. Four months later, Audi announced that Seidl would be leaving the team and he was replaced by Mattia Binotto who would assume a dual role of COO and CTO.

Seidl left the company on 1 August 2024, and was succeeded by former Ferrari engineer Mattia Binotto, who also succeeded Oliver Hoffmann, the director of the Formula 1 project at the Audi Group, thus combining these two key positions.
