= John Walton (Formula One) =

Irish Formula One team manager

- Born: 8 April 1957; Dublin, Ireland
- Died: 9 July 2004 (aged 47); St Thomas’ Hospital, London, England
- Occupation: Sporting Director
- Employer: Minardi F1 Team
- Predecessor: Cesare Fiorio
- Children: 5

John Walton (8 April 1957 – 9 July 2004) was an Irish motorsport professional who worked in a number of leading roles across numerous Formula One teams in the 1980s, 1990s and early 2000s.

== Career ==
Walton was born in Dublin, Ireland. He began working in motorsport when he was 13 years old and later went on to work with fellow Irishman Eddie Jordan in the Irish Formula Ford Championship, Formula Atlantic and British Formula 3 championships. The pair claimed the 1978 Irish Formula Atlantic title.

Alongside Jordan, he was one of the founding staff of the Eddie Jordan Racing team, before moving to the Toleman Formula One team in the mid-1980s, where he worked alongside Ayrton Senna in 1984. Walton became the chief mechanic of the Benetton Formula team after the Italian team took over the Toleman team in 1985.

Following the arrival of Flavio Briatore at Benetton in 1989 and the political turmoil that subsequently occurred at the team due to widespread restructuring, Walton joined the fledgling Jordan Grand Prix team in 1990 ahead of its debut season in Formula One in 1991 and stayed with the team until mid-1996, when he joined the Arrows F1 team. He spent 1999 out of Formula One.

Walton went on to join Prost Grand Prix in January 2000 as the team's Sporting Director and then moved on to occupy the same position at Minardi in 2002 until his death in 2004.

== Personal life ==
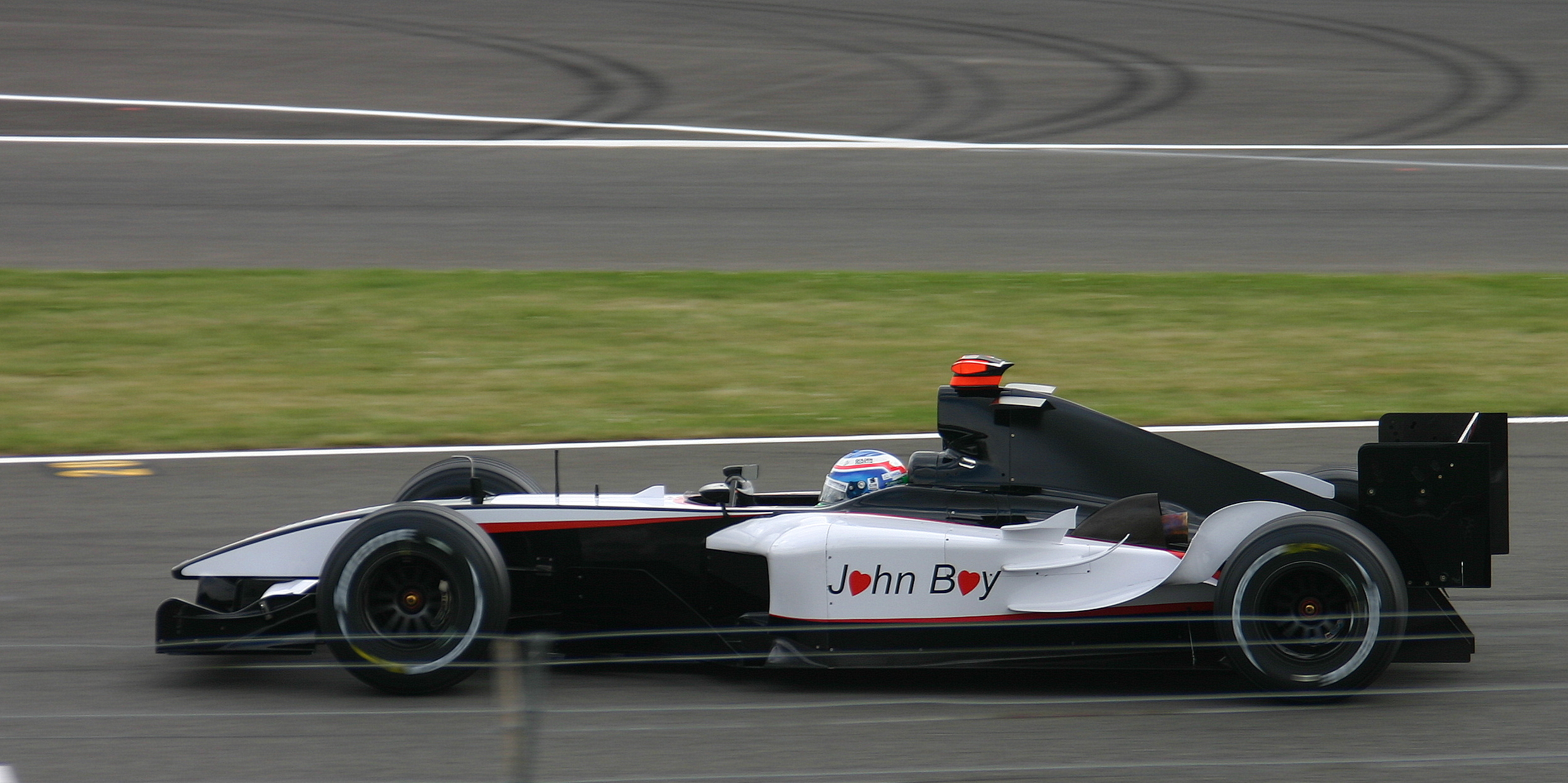
Minardi's tribute livery to Walton at the 2004 British Grand Prix

Walton died at the age of 47 on 9 July 2004 at St Thomas’ Hospital in London of a heart attack. At the time of his death, Walton was in a relationship with ITV Formula One presenter Louise Goodman. John Walton was survived by his two sons, Tony and Kevin, and his three daughters, Susan, Kelly and Jodie. He was most commonly known in the motorsport paddock as "John Boy".

The Minardi team choose not to run their cars in Saturday's early practice session for the 2004 British Grand Prix following Walton's death. Following his death on Friday night and with the agreement of its technical and commercial partners, for the remainder of the weekend the team ran the cars with a revised livery, with no sponsorship logos and featuring 'John Boy' on the rear wing and sidepods. In the race, one car was classified 16th, with the other failing to finish.
