= Mattia Binotto =

Italian motorsport engineer (born 1969)

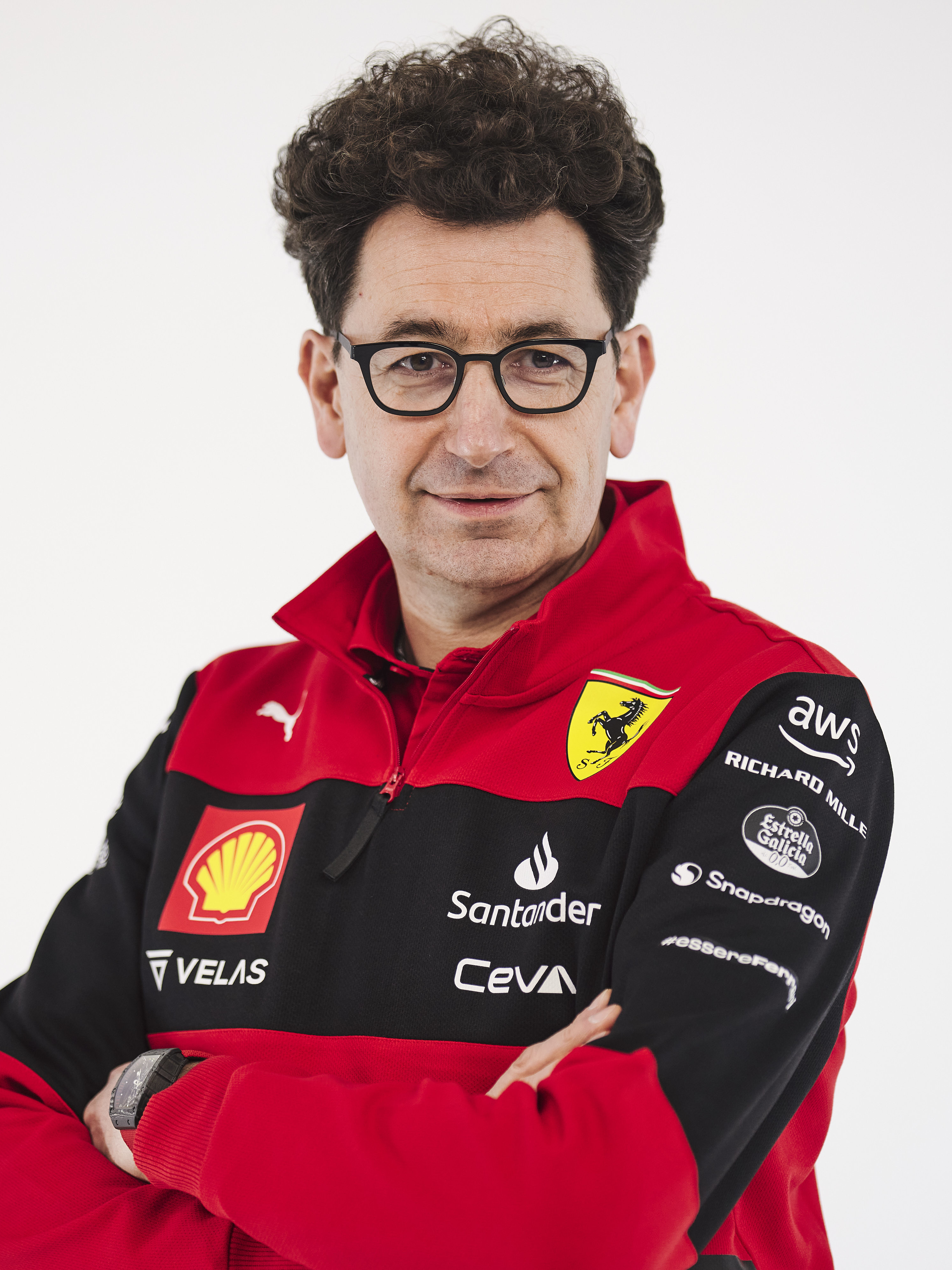
- Binotto in 2022
- Born: 3 November 1969 (age 56); Lausanne, Switzerland
- Education: École Polytechnique Fédérale de Lausanne; University of Modena and Reggio Emilia
- Occupations: Motorsport executive; Chief Technical Officer; engineer
- Years active: 1995-present
- Employers: Scuderia Ferrari (1995–2022); Sauber (2024–2025); Audi (2026–present)
- Title: Team Principal; Chief Executive Officer
- Predecessor: Andreas Seidl
- Children: 2

Mattia Binotto (born 3 November 1969) is an Italian motorsport engineer. Since 2026, Binotto has been the CEO and Team Principal of the Audi F1 Project, initially as Head of the Audi F1 Project before assuming the team principal role after the departure of Jonathan Wheatley in early 2026. From 2019 to 2022, he served as the team principal of Italian Formula One team Scuderia Ferrari in Formula One.

== Early and personal life ==
Binotto was born on 3 November 1969 in Lausanne, Vaud, Switzerland, to Italian parents. In 1994, he obtained a bachelor's degree in mechanical engineering at the Swiss Federal Institute of Technology in Lausanne, and then a master's degree in automotive engineering at the University of Modena.

== Career ==
=== Ferrari (1995–2022) ===
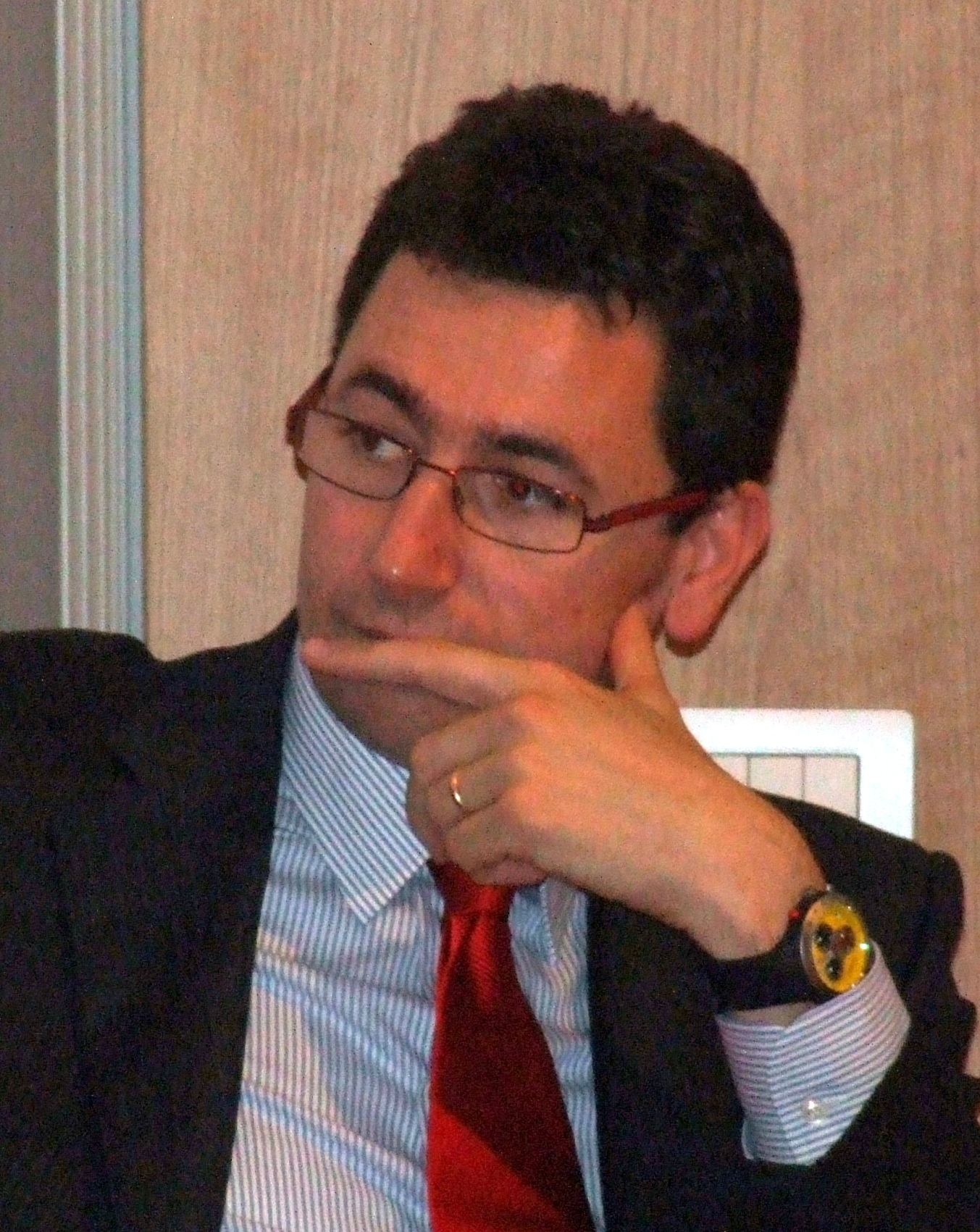
Binotto in 2008

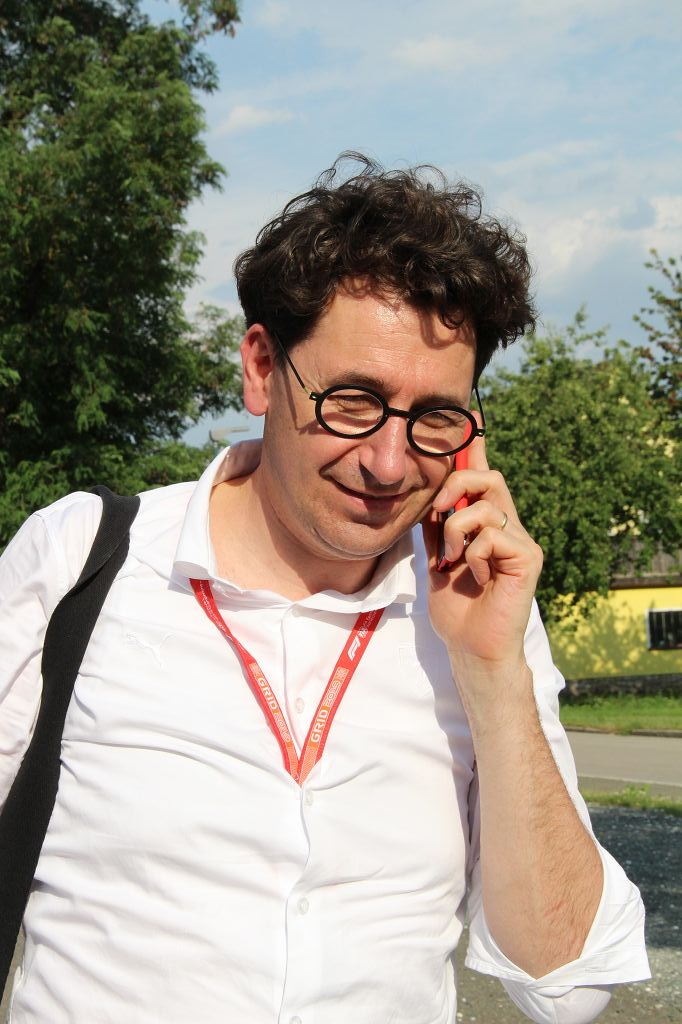
Binotto in 2019

In 1995, Binotto joined Scuderia Ferrari as an engine engineer on the test team. Binotto was part of the team during the successful early 2000s, when Michael Schumacher secured five consecutive Formula One World Championships. In 2007, he was promoted to the role of Race Engine Chief Engineer, and in 2009 he supervised the engine and KERS operations with Paolo Martinelli and subesequently with Luca Marmorini.

In 2013, Binotto became Head of the Engine Department, before becoming chief technical officer (CTO) of Ferrari in July 2016, replacing James Allison. During Binotto's two years as CTO, Ferrari once more competed for regular race wins. In 2019, he was promoted to team principal, replacing Maurizio Arrivabene. In November 2022, Binotto announced his resignation from the role. He left Ferrari after 27 years on 31 December 2022.

=== Private sector ===
In 2023, Binotto worked as a consultant for TEXA (Tecnologie Elettroniche X Automotive) in Treviso.

=== Sauber/Audi (2024–present) ===
On 1 August 2024, Binotto was announced as the replacement for Andreas Seidl and Oliver Hoffman as Chief Operating Officer and Chief Technical Officer of Sauber Motorsport as part of its transition to the Audi Formula One Team

Following Team Representative Alessandro Alunni Bravi's departure at the end of January 2025, Binotto served as the interim Team Principal of Sauber for the Australia and China races before Jonathan Wheatley joined the team from 1 April.

On 5 May 2025, it was announced that Binotto's responsibilities would be expanded to become the Head of the Audi F1 Project and that he would be responsible for development activities at the Hinwil and Neuburg an der Donau facilities, as well as at the future technical centre in England.

On 20 March 2026, Audi announced Wheatley's departure due to "personal reasons", with Binotto assuming Wheatley's Team Principal responsibilities.

On 24 April 2026, Audi announced that Binotto's position had been renamed to CEO and Team Principal, with newly-appointed Racing Director Allan McNish reporting to Binotto.
