= Kevin Piper =

Kevin Piper (born 30 September 1959 in Norwich, Norfolk) is an English television presenter and media personality. Piper started his career as a journalist at Eastern Counties Newspapers before joining the news and sports team with the independent local radio station Radio Broadland when it launched in 1984. In 1987 Piper joined Anglia TV as a sports reporter and presenter before becoming the station's Head of Sport. He was involved in the launch of ITV's Formula 1 coverage in 1997, attracting Martin Brundle, Murray Walker and Louise Goodman to the ITV line-up before producing network documentaries on Murray Walker and Eddie Jordan.

Piper combined his network sports duties with presenting Anglia’s flagship evening programme Anglia Tonight and fronting the station’s sports output on shows including Midweek Sports Special and Soccer Night. During his time with Anglia TV, Piper was nominated three times for the Royal Television Society’s "Regional Sports Presenter of the Year" award.

In 2001 Piper played a cameo role in the film Mike Bassett: England Manager, appearing as a newsreader in the opening scenes.

Piper left ITV Anglia in 2006, setting up his own media company Kevin Piper Media, specialising in broadcast and corporate film production. Credits include the 2010 FIFA World Cup in South Africa, 2008 UEFA European Championships in Switzerland and coverage of the World Rally Championship.

Kevin Piper Media produces BBC One's Late Kick-Off East programme, which topped the regional ratings in 2010. Piper co-wrote former Scotland and Norwich City goalkeeper Bryan Gunn's autobiography In Where It Hurts. He has also written a weekly sports column for the Eastern Daily Press.

In 2013, he commentated on the World Rally Championship programmes, alongside Paul King.
