= Louise Goodman =

British commentator and reporter

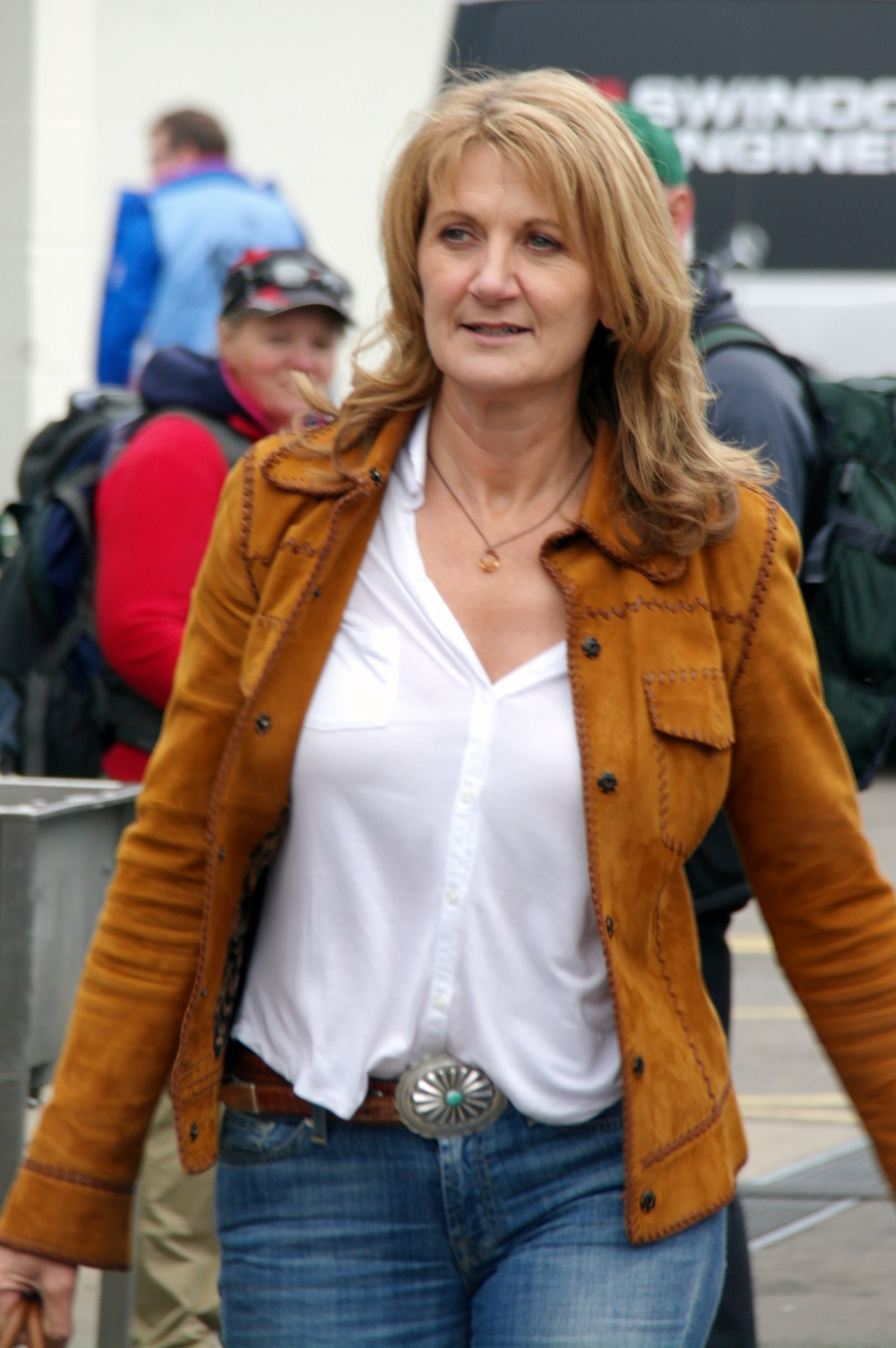
- Goodman in 2013.
- Born: 8 May 1963 (age 63); Derbyshire
- Employers: Leyton House; Jordan Grand Prix; ITV

Louise Goodman (born 8 May 1963) is a British motorsport reporter and presenter. She began working in the media as an editorial assistant for the Powerboat and Waterskiing Magazine and worked for the press officer Tony Jardine. Goodman was the head of communications of Leyton House's Formula One team for three years and then became press officer of Jordan Grand Prix until 1996. From 1997 to 2008, she was pit lane reporter for ITV's coverage of Formula One and covered the British Touring Car Championship on ITV4 from 2009 until stepping down in 2026. Goodman has also taken part in rallies either as a driver or navigator.

== Biography ==
=== Early life ===
Goodman was born on 8 May 1963 in Derbyshire. She grew up in Alresford, Hampshire, and has a sister. When she was a child, Goodman wanted to become a doctor but studying chemistry and physics made her decide not to go down their career route. She moved to London and worked at an architect's firm but she soon became tired of the job and made the decision to travel across the United States. It was during the travelling she met the editor of Powerboat and Waterskiing Magazine in Florida.

=== Journalism ===
She thus began her career in the media as an editorial assistant for the magazine for a brief period of time. Goodman reported on major international powerboating competitions, before working with the public relations officer Tony Jardine as a press officer on his BP account after meeting Jardine during her time working for the magazine. She worked on introducing the tobacco brand Camel to Formula One as a sponsor of Team Lotus in 1987. Although she was not a fan of Formula One growing up, she was appointed head of communications of Leyton House's Formula One team for three years starting in 1988. She was helped by the Williams press officer Ann Bradshaw. Goodman became the press officer for the Jordan racing team in Formula 3000 and Formula One after being offered the job by the team owner Eddie Jordan and remained in the role until the end of the 1996 season. She provided the South African Broadcast Corporation (SABC), Irish broadcaster RTÉ, and several local radio stations with live race reports.

=== Motorsport ===
She was approached by Kevin Piper, the head of sport for Anglia Television, and the journalist James Allen for an interest to work in television in mid-1996 as various production companies were bidding to produce programmes for ITV, when the broadcaster acquired the British television rights for Formula One from the BBC. According to Goodman, ITV wanted a woman on the team to reflect the female interest in Formula One. Goodman became one of the two roving pit lane reporters for ITV's coverage of Formula One in January 1997, having been employed for her knowledge of the championship, the drivers and people in the paddock. She worked alongside both Allen and with Ted Kravitz. Other than occasional pre-race segments by Beverley Turner, Goodman was the only woman in the team. Her first race was the 1997 Australian Grand Prix, and she was the first woman in the United Kingdom to report on the male-dominated arena of motorsport on television. Goodman was part of ITV's broadcast team across the twelve years of the broadcaster's coverage until it relinquished the rights after 2008. She missed the 2004 British Grand Prix due to the death of her partner John Walton, the Minardi team manager. She became the first female to be part of a pit stop when she removed the left rear tyre in a Midland pit stop for Tiago Monteiro at the 2006 British Grand Prix.

Starting in 1991, she also took part in multiple rallies driving either a Ford Ka, a Peugeot 205 or a Vauxhall Corsa or acting as a navigator in both championship and non-championship events after persuading Jardine for a long time to let her try the sport out. In 2007 Goodman became the presenter of ITV's coverage of the British Touring Car Championship (BTCC) alongside Kravitz. In 2008 she joined HondaRacingF1.com as guest presenter for Formula One's first online TV channel. The following year, Goodman became an ambassador of the Motor Sport Association UK's (MSA) Go Motorsport initiative to help people get into motor racing.

After the BBC regained the television rights to broadcast Formula One, she rejoined ITV4's extensive coverage of the BTCC alongside Steve Rider as reporter in 2009. Goodman provided cover for Channel 4's coverage of the 2017 British Grand Prix, for Lee McKenzie who was presenting coverage of the 2017 World Para Athletics Championship. For the 2018 Formula One World Championship, Goodman stood in for McKenzie as reporter for certain races. She stood down from her BTCC role following the conclusion of the 2026 season.

She runs the media training consultancy Goodman Media, and has authored pieces for magazines and newspapers such as The Observer, The Sun and The Times. Goodman has also covered the 24 Hours of Le Mans for Channel 4 and Quest, Car of the Year for UKTV and other programmes for ITV4 and the Audi Channel. She published the book Beyond the Pit Lane in 2000. Goodman is an ambassador for Girls on Track UK, promoting women in motorsport.
