= Jonathan Wheatley =

British motorsport executive and mechanic (born 1967)

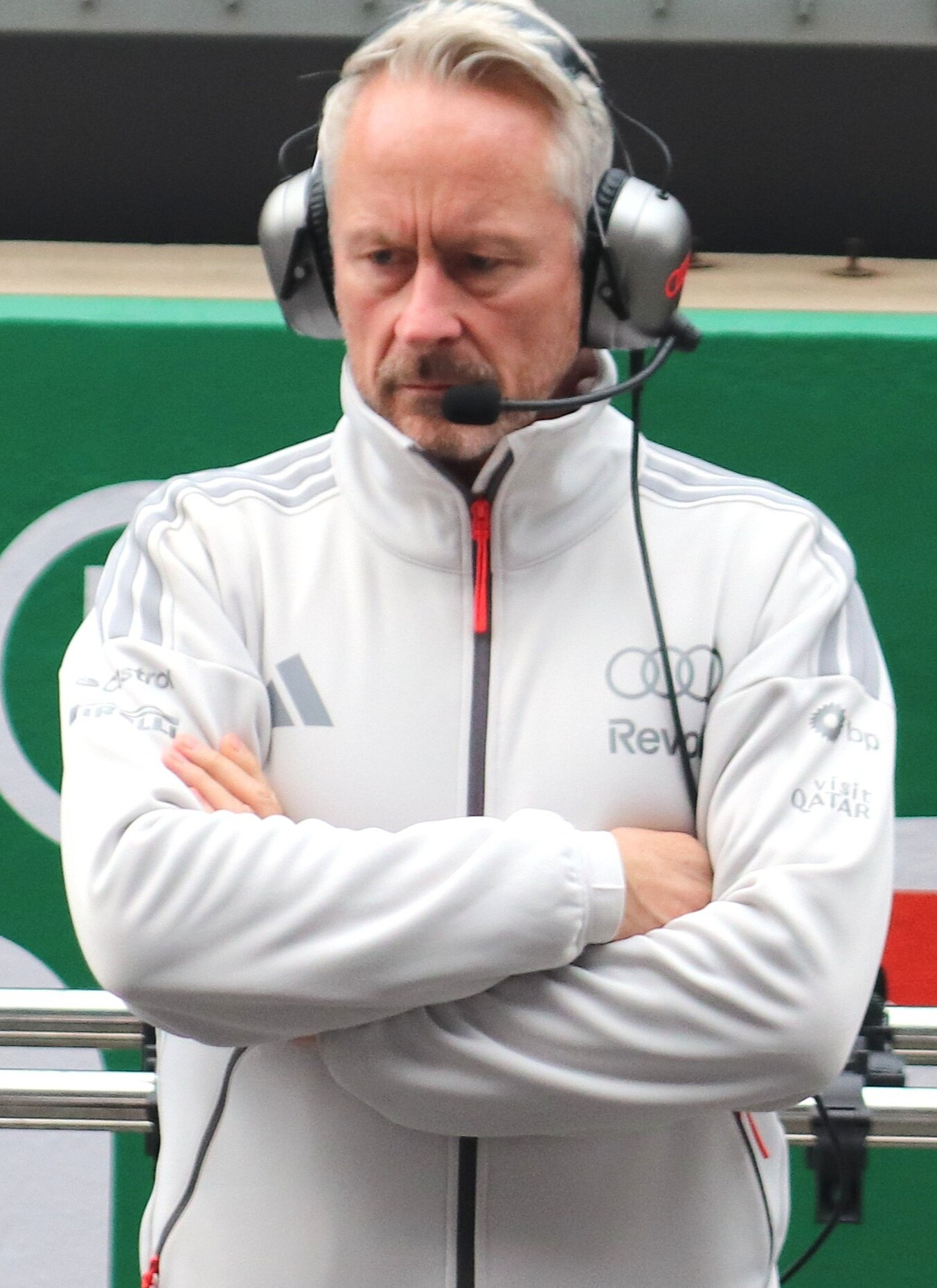
- Wheatley at the 2026 Chinese Grand Prix
- Born: 7 May 1967 (age 58); Beaconsfield, England
- Occupations: Motorsport executive; mechanic
- Employers: Formula One; Benetton (1991–2001); Renault (2002–2005); Red Bull Racing (2006–2024); Sauber (2025); Audi (2026)
- Title: Team Principal

Jonathan Wheatley (born 7 May 1967) is an English motorsport executive and mechanic. Wheatley has a major presence in Formula One and most recently served as the Team Principal of Audi's Formula One project from its inception. He also had major roles as the sporting director of Red Bull, as well as chief mechanic of Benetton and Renault.

Wheatley has contributed to eight World Constructors' Championship titles between 1995 and 2023: one as a mechanic at Benetton (1995), one as chief mechanic of Renault (2005), four as a team manager at Red Bull (2010–2013), and two as sporting director of Red Bull (2022–2023).

== Career ==
=== Formula One ===
==== Benetton / Renault (1991–2006) ====
Wheatley began his motorsport career at Benetton as a junior mechanic in the early 1990s. He rose through the ranks at the Enstone-based team to become the chief mechanic from 2001 until 2006 when he left to join Red Bull Racing.

During his time in Enstone, the team won two World Constructors' Championship titles and 33 Grands Prix.

==== Red Bull (2006–2024) ====
Wheatley previously served as Sporting Director and Team Manager at Red Bull from 2018 and 2006 respectively, his role at Red Bull included ensuring that the team operated within the FIA sporting regulations, monitoring communication and supervising Red Bull's pit crew, who were widely regarded to be among the best in Formula One.

Red Bull's pit crew broke the then-world record for fastest Formula One pit stop during the 2019 Brazilian Grand Prix—servicing Max Verstappen's RB15 in a time of just 1.82 seconds—beating their previous world record of 1.88 seconds set less than four months prior at the 2019 German Grand Prix. The record stood until the 2023 Qatar Grand Prix, where it was beaten by McLaren with a time of 1.80 seconds.

On 1 August 2024, Red Bull announced Wheatley's departure as Sporting Director at the end of the 2024 season to join Audi as their first Team Principal, following a period of gardening leave.

During his time in Milton Keynes, Red Bull have won six World Constructors' Championship titles and 120 Grands Prix.

==== Sauber / Audi (2025–2026) ====
Announced in August 2024, Wheatley was expected to join Sauber as their inaugural team principal in the summer of 2025 ahead of their 2026 campaign as Audi. However, following Team Representative Alessandro Alunni Bravi's early departure at the end of January, Wheatley's gardening leave ended early and he was released from his Red Bull contract earlier. He started his new role as Team Principal of Sauber on 1 April, three days before the Japanese Grand Prix. During this period, Chief Operating and Technical Officer Mattia Binotto served as the Team Principal temporarily for the team during the Australian and Chinese Grands Prix. On 20 March 2026, Audi announced Wheatley's departure due to "personal reasons", with Binotto assuming Wheatley's Team Principal responsibilities.
