= NASCAR Heat 5 =

2020 racing video game

- Cover art featuring Chase Elliott
- Developer: 704Games
- Publisher: Motorsport Games
- Series: NASCAR Heat
- Engine: Unity
- Platforms: PlayStation 4; Windows; Xbox One; Nintendo Switch
- Release: July 10, 2020 (Note: Gold Edition released three days prior on July 7, 2020.)
- Genre: Racing
- Modes: Single-player, multiplayer

NASCAR Heat 5 is a racing video game simulating the 2020 NASCAR Cup Series, 2020 NASCAR Xfinity Series, 2020 NASCAR Gander RV & Outdoors Truck Series, and 2022 NASCAR Cup Series, it was developed by 704Games and was published by Motorsport Games on July 10, 2020, for PlayStation 4, Xbox One and Windows via Steam. Chase Elliott is the cover athlete for the standard edition, and Tony Stewart is the cover athlete for the Gold edition. The game was delisted from digital storefronts on December 31, 2024, and online servers were shut down on August 1, 2025.

== Gameplay ==
Other than a new single-player track testing mode, gameplay remained largely the same as its predecessor, NASCAR Heat 4. Minor tweaks to pit stops, the paint booth and in-race retirements (DNF) were also introduced.

== Racing series featured ==
Racing Series Name	No. of Drivers	No. of Tracks
2020 NASCAR Cup Series	75 (1 part-timer, 32 NASCAR Heat Pro League Drivers, 40 NCS Drivers, 2 Legacy Drivers (Comes With Gold Edition))	31
2020 NASCAR Xfinity Series	45 (7-part time cars, 38 NXS Drivers)	31
2020 NASCAR Gander RV & Outdoors Truck Series	35 (3-part-time trucks, 32 NCWTS Drivers)	32
Xtreme Dirt Tour (Fantasy League)	24	12

== Soundtrack ==
Song	Artist
Again & Again	Fire Fences
Earthquake	Matthew Szlachetka
HEAT	Avoid
Keep the Car Running	Andrew Leahey
Late Bloomer	Brett Wiscons
Let's Go Out Tonight	Bradley Wik and the Charlatans
Long Year	Steve Everett
Never Love You	Steve Everett
Pay Day	Fire Fences
Song About James	Avoid
We're Gonna Be OK	Hey Monea

== Development and release ==
After having Monster Games develop the first four installments of the rebooted NASCAR Heat series, publisher 704Games took over development and handed publishing over to Motorsport Games. NASCAR Heat 5 was released on July 7, 2020, for those who pre-ordered the Gold Edition; standard copies of the game were released on July 10. Along with the early release date, the Gold Edition includes bonus spotter voices, paint schemes and career mode opportunities. Additional downloadable content packs were also announced with the release of the game.

A Nintendo Switch port called NASCAR Heat Ultimate Edition+ was quietly listed on Amazon in October 2021, and was released on November 19, 2021. In addition to 2020 content, it also includes drivers and primary paint schemes from the 2021 NASCAR Cup Series season.

=== Next Gen cars ===
Due to the poor reception of NASCAR 21: Ignition, Motorsport Games announced their intentions to return to Heat 5 for future DLC. The firm announced the introduction of Next Gen Cars and their respective driver lineup in downloadable content for the game, updating it for the 2022 season. Unlike its successor NASCAR 21: Ignition, the DLC is not free and would initially be priced at $12.34 before being lowered to $9.99 following a delay. Motorsport Games, in a statement posted to Twitter, stated their intention to provide a much more stable experience. After a period where no updates were shared, the team eventually shared their plans to release the 2022 cars during the month of May 2023, after the 2022 season had already concluded. Over this period, fans had created a mod for the game that adds the 2023 paint schemes.

The DLC would eventually be released on June 22, 2023 on all platforms; it received negative reviews due to fan dissatisfaction with the management of current publisher Motorsport Games, lack of new tracks added for the 2022 season, bugs, loss of player progress, and due to the 2022 season being outdated as of the DLC's release.

== Reception ==
Reception

Aggregate scores
Aggregator	Score
Metacritic	(PS4) 63/100 (XONE) 69/100
OpenCritic	30% recommend

Review scores
Publication	Score
SportsGamersOnline	7.25/10
PC Invasion	5.5/10
Forbes	7.5/10
Hardcore Gamer	3.5/5

The PlayStation 4 and Xbox One versions of NASCAR Heat 5 both received "mixed or average" reviews from critics, according to the review aggregation website Metacritic. Fellow review aggregator OpenCritic assessed that the game received weak approval, being recommended by 30% of critics.

Before its release, Heat 5 was criticized for focusing on minor changes instead of addressing major issues that previous Heat titles had. Developer 704Games claimed that the approach was due to limitations of legacy code that the game was built on.
