= NASCAR Heat (series) =

Video game series

- Genres: NASCAR, Auto racing, Sim racing
- Developers: Monster Games; Dusenberry Martin Racing; 704Games
- Publishers: Dusenberry Martin Racing; 704Games; Motorsport Games
- Platforms: Android, iOS, Microsoft Windows, PlayStation 4, Xbox One, Nintendo Switch
- First release: NASCAR Heat Evolution; September 13, 2016
- Latest release: NASCAR Heat 5 July 7, 2020

NASCAR Heat is a series of NASCAR video games developed and produced by Monster Games and 704Games, who has held the license to publish NASCAR video games from 2015-2025. The first game in the series to be published in the series was NASCAR Heat Evolution, and the latest game to be released in the series was NASCAR Heat 5.

== History ==
In May 2016, Monster Games announced the first NASCAR video game to be released for PlayStation 4 and Xbox One. The working title was NASCAR Heat Evolution, and Dusenberry Martin Racing was named a co-developer. DMR had previously acquired a NASCAR license in January 2015. Released in September, the game received lackluster reviews for not including enough features. A sequel, NASCAR Heat 2, was released on September 12, 2017, and included the Xfinity Series and Camping World Truck Series in addition to the Cup Series, which NHE exclusively featured. NASCAR Heat 3 was released on September 7, 2018, and featured the fictional Xtreme Dirt Tour. On September 14, 2019, NASCAR Heat 4 was released.

For NASCAR Heat 5, 704Games replaced Monster as developer and brought on Motorsport Games as publisher. The game was released in early July, a departure from the traditional September date; as an effect, the developers focused on smaller improvements.

In July 2021, Motorsport Games confirmed that they would be discontinuing the NASCAR Heat branding, it will be using the rFactor 2 physics engine and the Unreal Engine for the upcoming official NASCAR game. The game's name was later unveiled as NASCAR 21: Ignition, and is set to be released in October 26 and 28.

A standalone mobile game, NASCAR Heat Mobile, was released on April 25, 2017.

== Gameplay ==
Heat has been criticized throughout its run for having little and low-quality presentation. The games feature playable challenges that unlock driver tutorials, and a single-player test mode was added for Heat 5.

=== Physics ===
Heat games feature a controller vibration when drafting. They also dynamic artificial intelligence. The game features a default automatic transmission, criticized for not carrying enough momentum. The game has been described as a mix of arcade and simulation. Between Heat 3 and Heat 4, the developers redid physics at a number of tracks, and also revamped the game's artificial intelligence.

=== Multiplayer ===
The series started with a bare-bones multiplayer option. Beginning with Heat 3, the eNASCAR Heat Pro League was sanctioned on the console, although NH3's online package was still criticized by reviewers.

=== Career ===
Heat games allow players to create a custom character in Career mode. Heat Evolution was criticized for having little to no plotline in Career mode, but did allow users to improve their car through a series of upgrades. Heat 2 introduced a new "Hot Seat" feature where players started in a part-time season before progressing to full-time. In Heat 3, players could own their own team in any series.
