= GP Racing =

Monthly magazine

- Cover of November 2024 issue
- Editor: Stuart Codling
- Categories: Sport
- Frequency: Monthly
- Circulation: 64,897 a month
- First issue: March 1996 (as F1 Racing)
- Company: Haymarket (1996–2016); Motorsport Network (2016–present)
- Country: United Kingdom
- Based in: London
- Website: gpracing.com
- ISSN: 1361-4487

GP Racing, formerly F1 Racing, was a monthly magazine focused on Formula One racing published from March 1996 to December 2024. In 2025, the publication was merged with its sister brand Autosport to create a newly combined monthly publication; which effectively ended the GP Racing magazine after 28 years in circulation.

== Launch and development ==
F1 Racing's launch was the culmination of a year of preparation by UK publishers Haymarket. The magazine's genesis was inspired by the sport's peak in popularity following the death of Ayrton Senna, and high-profile rivalry between Michael Schumacher and Damon Hill. Haymarket's weekly Autosport and Motorsport News titles supplied a pool of talented writers and their contacts: with the weekly market well served, F1 Racing would be more feature-based and former Autosport writer Mike Herd was appointed editor.

Two business decisions in particular made the new title feasible: Haymarket's focus on agreeing annual (rather than monthly or ad-hoc) deals with advertisers, and its publication of a German edition to capitalise upon Schumacher's popularity. A private 'dummy' test issue was produced in November 1995, dubbed 'Issue Zero', before the first issue proper was published to coincide with the beginning of the 1996 season.

Much of the title's growth took place under long-standing editor Matt Bishop, who took over the helm of the title in December 1996. Bishop left both F1 Racing and Autosport (for which he wrote an online column) in late 2007 to join McLaren and was replaced as editor of the monthly magazine by the then executive editor Tim Scott, and later by Hans Seeberg. On 9 May 2012 it was announced that Anthony Rowlinson would become the magazine's new editor.

In July 2005, F1 Racing celebrated its one hundredth issue; it continued to publish in over twenty countries, and claimed the title "The World's Best-Selling Grand Prix Magazine". In the one hundred issues, Michael Schumacher had been cover feature over forty times – more than any other driver – including the first issue in March 1996. In February 2001, a "Michael Schumacher Special Edition" was published.

Many well respected journalists and photographers contributed to the magazine. Such regulars included journalists Peter Windsor and Alan Henry, and renowned photographers Darren Heath, Steven Tee, Rip (Ripley & Ripley), and Lorenzo Bellanca. Damon Hill was 'Guest Editor' in January 2000, which featured an interview between him and Michael Schumacher. From the March 2006 issue to the February 2007 of F1 Racing, Max Mosley, then president of the FIA, had a monthly column in the magazine.

In 2011, F1 Racing was made available as a digital download, alongside the print edition.

In 2016, Haymarket sold their motorsport properties to Motorsport Network, including F1 Racing.

In February 2020 it was announced that the magazine would no longer licence the F1 trademark and that from the March 2020 issue it would be renamed GP Racing. Editor Ben Anderson wrote in his editorial column that because of the cost of the licence, "...it would not have been sustainable for us to continue reporting on Formula 1 in this way without significantly increasing the price of the magazine, reducing the physical quality of the product, or sacrificing its editorial independence."

In late 2024 Autosport and GP Racing merged and the magazine ended with its December 2024 issue.

== Team sponsorship ==
F1 Racing magazine briefly sponsored the ill-fated Mastercard Lola team in 1997. However, the team failed to qualify for the opening round of that season at the 1997 Australian Grand Prix with both of their cars having failed to make the 107% time. The team withdrew from the next race in Brazil and withdrew from the whole championship soon after.

== McLaren 'brake steer' scoop ==
At the 1997 Austrian Grand Prix, Darren Heath, an F1 Racing photographer, noticed that the rear brakes of the McLarens were glowing red in an acceleration zone of the track. The magazine discovered through investigation that McLaren had installed a second brake pedal, selectable by the driver to act on any one of the rear wheels. This allowed the driver to eliminate understeer and reduce wheelspin when exiting slow corners. This system was entirely legal, but was an innovation, and hence gave McLaren an advantage. While F1 Racing suspected what McLaren were doing, they required proof to publish the story.

At the 1997 Luxembourg Grand Prix the two McLarens retired from the race while in first and second positions. This allowed Heath to take a picture of the footwell of Häkkinen's car and the second brake pedal. The story was run in the November issue of F1 Racing and led to the system being dubbed "brake steer". Ferrari's protestations to the FIA led to the system being banned at the 1998 Brazilian Grand Prix.

== International editions ==
- Australia
- Brazil
- Bulgaria
- Colombia
- China
- Croatia (2005–2009)
- Czech Republic (2000–2010)
- Finland (1998–2003)
- France
- Germany (1996–2017)
- Greece (2001–2006)
- Hong Kong
- Hungary
- India
- Indonesia (2000–2011, 2012–2014, 2016-2017)
- Italy
- Japan (1999–2002, 2004–2012)
- Malaysia
- Mexico
- Netherlands
- Philippines
- Poland
- Romania
- Russia (2004–2006)
- Singapore
- South Korea
- Spain (1999–2012, 2013–)
- Sweden (−2008)
- Taiwan
- Turkey
- United Arab Emirates
- United Kingdom
- United States
