= Motorsport.com =

Motorsports racing news website

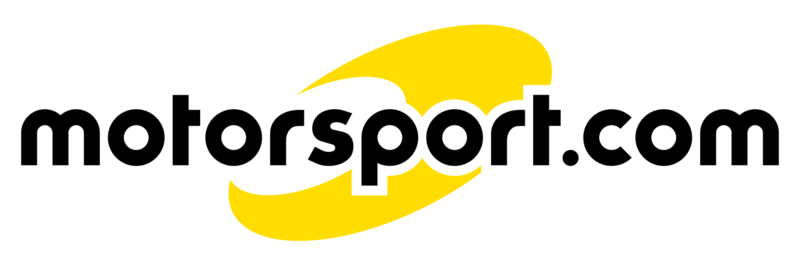
- Website type: Sports news
- Available in: Editions (21); Languages- English, Spanish, Portuguese, French, Italian, German, Dutch, Japanese, Polish, Russian, Chinese, Arabic, Hungarian, Ukrainian, Indonesian and Turkish
- Owner: Motorsport Network
- Website: www.motorsport.com
- Registration: Optional
- Launched: 9 April 1994; 32 years ago
- Current status: Active

Motorsport.com is a website specializing in motor racing news. It posts content in thirteen languages. It is part of the Motorsport Network Media LLC (MSNM) company. Motorsport.com's headquarters are in Miami, United States. MSNM, a leading media company in the world, is acquired by GMF Media, an affiliate of GMF Capital.

== History ==
Motorsport.com was formed in 1994.

In March 2015, Motorsport.com acquired ToileF1.com., followed by Worldcarfans.com and Edimotive S.r.l. in May. In May, the Grand Prix Drivers' Association and Motorsport.com joined forces to allow followers of the FIA Formula 1 World Championship to voice and share their opinions about the sport through an extensive worldwide survey for fans. More than 200,000 respondents from 194 countries participated in the survey. In June, Motorsport.com acquired TotalRace.com.br, RaceFansTV and Formulawahad.com, while later gaining the technical archive of Giorgio Piola in September, also announcing a partnership with MSN.com. In October, Motorsport.com became the official media partner of Ferrari for the 2016 Ferrari Finali Mondiali and a global partner of GPTicketShop.com. In November, Motorsport.com acquired Wildsoft Digital F1 Encyclopedia. The following month, the site formed a global digital content partnership with VICE Sports and AOL's Autoblog.com.

In 2016 Motorsport.com acquired French pan-european TV-station Motors TV after it went into a bankruptcy procedure. In 2018 the renamed Motorsport.TV decided to stop broadcasting as a television station and closed down the television operation.

In January 2016, Motorsport.com appointed Zak Brown as non-executive chairman of Motorsport.com In February, the site announced a strategic merchandising partnership with UK-based Branded-London and Puma Company. In March 2016, Motorsport.com became the official digital media partner of the FIA World Endurance Championship, while also extending exclusive digital rights agreement to host the F1 video magazine Series Inside Grand Prix. On 15 March 2016, Motorsport.com acquired Spain's moto racing digital media company Motocuatro.com. In April 2016, Motorsport.com acquired TurkiyeF1.com, Turkish auto racing website. In May 2016 Motorsport.com acquired gp-live.hu. In June 2016 Motorsport.com acquired F1-Ukraine.com.ua. The following month, the site become official media partner" of the 2016 TCR International Series. In March 2017, Motorsport.com launched a tri-language Swiss edition in partnership with businessman Lorenzo Senna.

In 2016, Motorsport.com expanded to Japan through a joint venture with digital media company, Kotsu Times Sha Co.

== Awards ==
Motorsport.com received Silver Telly Award by Telly Awards.
