= Motorsport News =

British weekly magazine

- Type: Weekly newspaper
- Format: Compact
- Owner(s): Kelsey Media
- Editor: Matt James
- Founded: 1955
- Headquarters: Richmond, England
- Circulation: 6,665 (ABC Jan–Dec 2017)
- Website: www.fastcar.co.uk/motorsportnews/

Motorsport News is a British weekly newspaper offering news, reports and analysis of circuit racing, rallying and other forms of motor sport. Its offices are in Richmond in Middlesex.

== History ==
It was first published in 1955 as Motoring News, a monthly publication aimed at domestic car owners, but was bought in 1957 by Teesdale Publications, the publishers of Motor Sport. Motoring News was relaunched as a weekly newspaper focused on motorsport at all levels, from amateur hill-climbs and autotests to Formula One and world rallying.

Following the death of its owner, Wesley J. Tee, Teesdale Publications was sold in 1996 to Haymarket Publishing. In 2000 Haymarket rebranded Motoring News as Motorsport News.

In 2016 the publication was sold along with other titles in Haymarket's motoring portfolio to Miami-based Motorsport Network to form Autosport Media UK Ltd.

In January 2020 Motorsport News was acquired by Kelsey Media, who publish several other motoring and specialist magazines.

== Alumni ==
Amongst the notable motorsport journalists to work for the publication are Alan Henry and David Tremayne. Its first editor was Cyril Posthumus.

== Event sponsorship ==
Motoring News initiated and sponsored a very successful national rally championship from 1961 to 1987.

Motorsport News has been the title sponsor of a rally championship at UK racing circuits since 2015.
