= Autosport International =

- Status: Active
- Genre: Motorsport
- Dates: 9–12 January 2024
- Venue: National Exhibition Centre
- Locations: Birmingham, U.K.
- Country: United Kingdom
- Attendance: 90,000 (2019)
- Organizer: Motorsport Network
- Website: autosportinternational.com

Autosport International is a four-day motorsport event that includes a two-day trade show for industry professionals and a two-day public show.

It is held at the NEC, in Birmingham, United Kingdom and operated by Motorsport Network, usually in the second week of January. The 2024 show will be held on the 9–12 January.

It typically has 32,000 trade visitors and 63,000 public visitors, 5,000 of whom are from overseas and 80% of whom are male.

Many categories of track and off-road motor racing are represented , including Formula One, BTCC, and 24 Hours of Le Mans. The show also has a "Live Action Arena" where spectators can see motorsport, including stunts.

The show has close links with many industry magazines including Autosport, Motorsport News and F1 Racing, who all attend. Some industry bodies offer members discounts and offers. These include the Motor Sports Association and the British Racing and Sports Car Club
