= Marketing (magazine) =

In the context of magazines, Marketing may refer to:

- Marketing (British magazine), established 1931, defunct 2016
- Marketing (Canadian magazine), which merged into Strategy in 2016

== See also ==
- Marketing
