= Cyril Posthumus =

British motoring journalist (1918–1992)

Cyril Posthumus (28 August 1918 – 9 October 1992) was a British writer on the history of motor cars.

== Career ==
Posthumus was Associate Editor of Autosport from 1950 and Motoring News from 1957, where he served as editor until 1959, and again from 1961. From 1963 he was features editor on The Motor until 1966. After two years with Motor Racing he remained a freelance for the rest of his career, whilst also editing the Brooklands Society Gazette.

== Works ==
His works include:

- The 16 Cylinder G.P. Auto Union, 1967 Profile Publications
- The 1926–1927 1½ Litre Delage, 1966 Profile Publications
- 4½ litre Lago-Talbot, 1972 Profile Publications
- The British Competition Car, 1959 Batsford Academic
- Classic Racing Cars, ISBN 9780600319092
- Classic Sports Cars, with David Hodge ISBN 9780863630231
- Land Speed Record: A Complete History of the Record-Breaking Cars from 39 to 600+ m.p.h., ISBN 9780850450378
- The German Grand Prix, 1966 Temple Press
- Mercedes and Mercedes-Benz Racing Car Guide 1901-1955, ISBN 9780851840253
- Motor Cars (Transport & Society), ISBN 9780853409342
- The 1906-1908 Renault Grand Prix, 1967 (Profile Publications Number 79)
- The Racing Car Development and Design, with Cecil Clutton and Denis Jenkinson, 1956 BT Batsford Ltd, London
- The Roaring Twenties: An album of early motor racing, ISBN 9780713709674
- Sir Henry Segrave, a biography of the British racing car driver, 1961 BT Batsford Ltd, London
- The Story of Veteran & Vintage Cars, ISBN 9780517209820
- Vintage Cars, concerning cars made in the 1920s, ISBN 9780600391319
- World Sportscar Championship, 1961 MacGibbon and Kee
- numerous articles in Road & Track, Car and Driver, etc.
