= Darren Heath =

Darren Heath is a motorsport photographer specialising in Formula One motor racing known for his creative and artistic coverage of the sport. Covering every Grand Prix Heath works with both editorial and commercial clients worldwide.

Heath was also the Chief Photographer of the Autocourse motorsport annual for the 2003–2004 and 2004–2005 editions.

Heath was awarded an Honorary Fellowship of The Royal Photographic Society in 2005. These are awarded to distinguished persons having, from their position or attainments, an intimate connection with the science or fine art of photography or the application thereof.

== Early life ==
Heath's grandfather was a grasstrack racer who competed in events at Brands Hatch before the track had been laid and surfaced with Tarmac.

Discovering a passion for photography in his early teenage years using a Kodak Instamatic 25, Heath spent weekends at Brands Hatch circuit in Kent England photographing many different formulae. Starting as a junior black & white printer at Zooom Photographic in Fulham, London, Heath covered 35+ UK races in 1988. The 1989 German Grand Prix represented Heath's first shoot at a foreign Grand Prix.

=== F1 Racing ===
As chief contributing photographer for F1 Racing magazine from 1996 to 2007 Heath effectively – through his coverage of the sport – is credited with changing the way Formula 1 is photographed, concentrating on introducing an artistic 'feeling' to coverage of the sport. Aside from beautiful imagery Heath is also credited with one of the most sensational F1 news stories in recent times. In late 1997 Heath's pictures revealed a secret independent braking system used by the McLaren team. Taking a picture of the footwell of David Coulthard's retired car (at the 1997 Luxembourg Grand Prix) and pictures of McLarens exiting corners with their rear brake discs glowing (at the 1997 Austrian Grand Prix). The team was using a second brake pedal on one of the rear wheels, which allowed the driver to alter the car's behaviour in corners. The system was imitated by the Williams and Jordan teams the following season. The sensitive cockpit picture was published exclusively in F1 Racing in that year's November issue. The device was subsequently banned by Formula One's governing body, the Fédération Internationale de l'Automobile (FIA).

=== Present ===
Heath continues to cover every round of the F1 world championship for a variety of clients bringing contemporary techniques to bear upon his event coverage.
