= Koenigsegg CCX =

Swedish mid-engine sports car

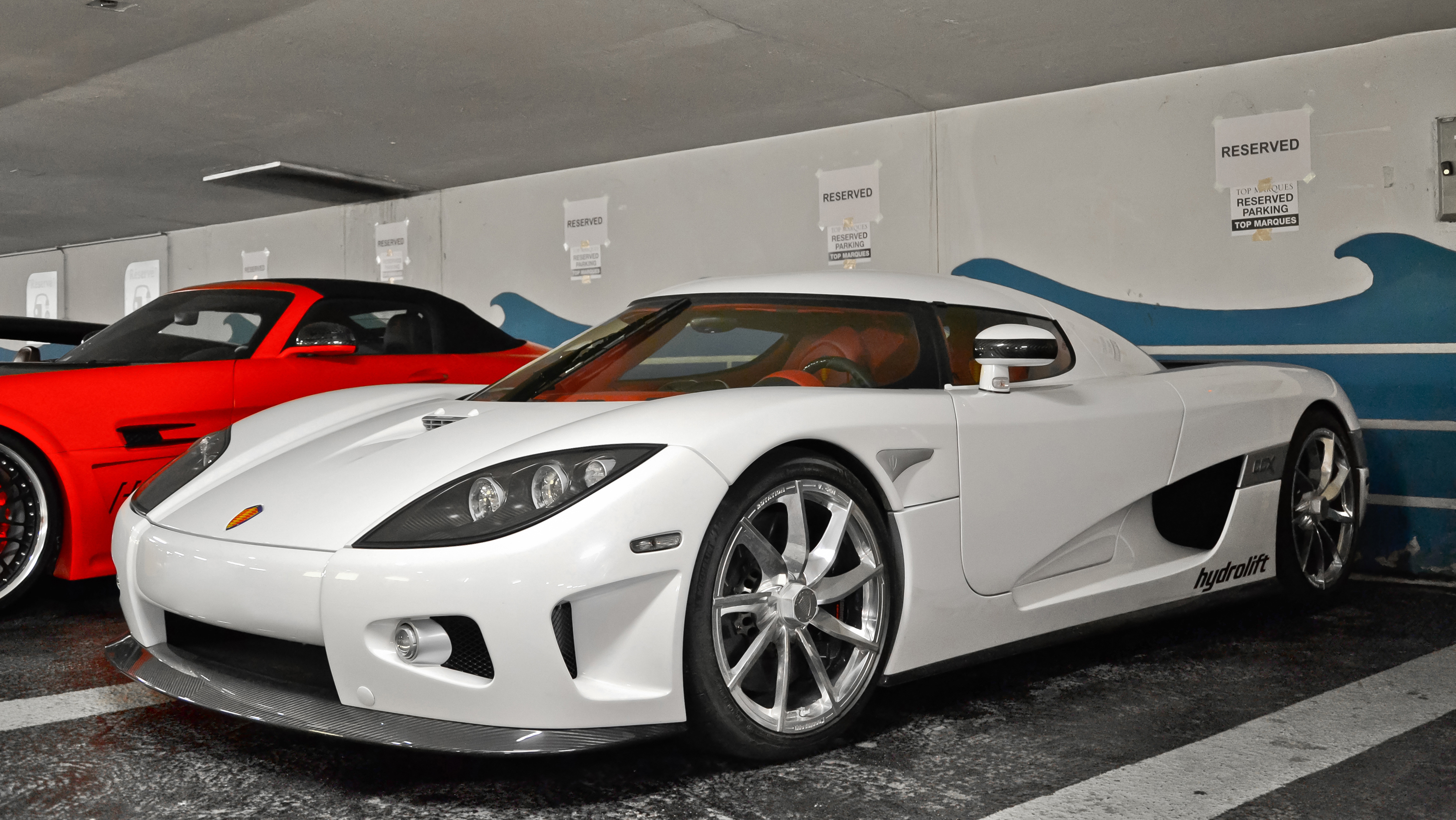

Overview
- Manufacturer: Koenigsegg Automotive AB
- Production: 2006–2010; 29 produced
- Model years: 2006–2010
- Assembly: Ängelholm, Sweden
- Designer: Christian von Koenigsegg; David Crafoord; Sven-Harry Åkesson

Body and chassis
- Class: Sports car (S)
- Body style: 2-door targa top
- Layout: Rear mid-engine, rear-wheel-drive
- Platform: Koenigsegg CC
- Doors: Dihedral Synchro-Helix

Powertrain
- Engine: 4.7 L Koenigsegg twin supercharged V8; 4.8 L Koenigsegg twin supercharged V8 (Edition Series)
- Power output: 806–1,018 PS (593–749 kW; 795–1,004 hp)
- Transmission: 6-speed manual 6-speed sequential

Dimensions
- Wheelbase: 2,660 mm (104.7 in)
- Length: 4,293 mm (169.0 in)
- Width: 1,996 mm (78.6 in)
- Height: 1,120 mm (44.1 in)
- Curb weight: 1,456 kg (3,210 lb)

Chronology
- Predecessor: Koenigsegg CCR
- Successor: Koenigsegg Agera

The Koenigsegg CCX is a mid-engine sports car manufactured by Swedish automotive manufacturer Koenigsegg Automotive AB. The project began with the aim of making a global car, designed and engineered to comply with global safety and environment regulations, particularly to enter the United States car market. To sell cars in the US, many alterations were made to the design of the CCR; the previously used Ford Modular engine was replaced by an in-house developed Koenigsegg engine designed to run on 91 octane fuel, readily available in the United States, and to meet Californian emission standards.

The name CCX is an abbreviation for Competition Coupé X, the X commemorating the 10th anniversary (X being the Roman numeral for ten) of the completion and test drive of the first CC prototype in 1996.

== Overview ==
The CCX was unveiled at the 2006 Geneva Motor Show, sporting body modifications to meet US vehicle regulations and a new in-house developed 4.7L twin supercharged V8 engine capable of generating a maximum power output of 806 PS (593 kW; 795 hp) at 7,000 rpm and 920 N⋅m (679 lb⋅ft) of torque at 5,500 rpm while running on 91 octane gasoline.

=== Powertrain ===
The new engine is of all-aluminium construction made out of 356 aluminium with a T7 heat treatment to further enhance block integrity and cylinder bore chill during casting. Specifically created and cast for Koenigsegg by Grainger & Worrall, a casting specialist with F1 experience in drivetrain components, the engine was built, assembled and tested at their Ängelholm production plant. The engine is lubricated with a dry sump system with a separate oil pump and the pistons are cooled by means of an internal cooler that sprays oil onto them in order to run high cylinder pressure with 91 octane fuel making it capable of 14 mpg_{‑US} (17 L/100 km; 17 mpg_{‑imp}) in combined cycle and 18 mpg_{‑US} (13 L/100 km; 22 mpg_{‑imp}) in highway travel. Available transmissions are a CIMA 6-speed manual and a 6-speed sequential manual transmission. Power is fed to the wheels through a torque-sensitive limited-slip differential.

=== Body ===
The chassis is made from carbon fibre reinforced with kevlar and aluminium honeycomb like the previous models. While the body keeps the targa top body style and the dihedral synchro-helix actuation doors, it is completely reworked. There is a new front bumper design, enhanced brake cooling, fog lamps, US patented head lamps, a new fresh air intake on the bonnet that acts as ram air booster, air intakes behind the front wheels to enhance airflow and a glass window over the engine.

The CCX has a frontal area of 2,894 sq in (1.867 m^{2}) and a drag coefficient of Cd=0.32, with a CdA of 0.56 m^{2} (6.0 sq ft). It also has a flat underside with venturi tunnels at the rear and an optional rear spoiler to improve downforce. At 200 km/h (124 mph) there is 60 kg (130 lb) of downforce over the front axle and 65 kg (143 lb) over the rear. The car is 88 mm (3.5 in) longer to comply with the US rear impact regulations and to free space around the rear muffler. On the interior, there is 50 mm (2 in) of extra headroom as well as specifically designed Sparco carbon fibre seats.

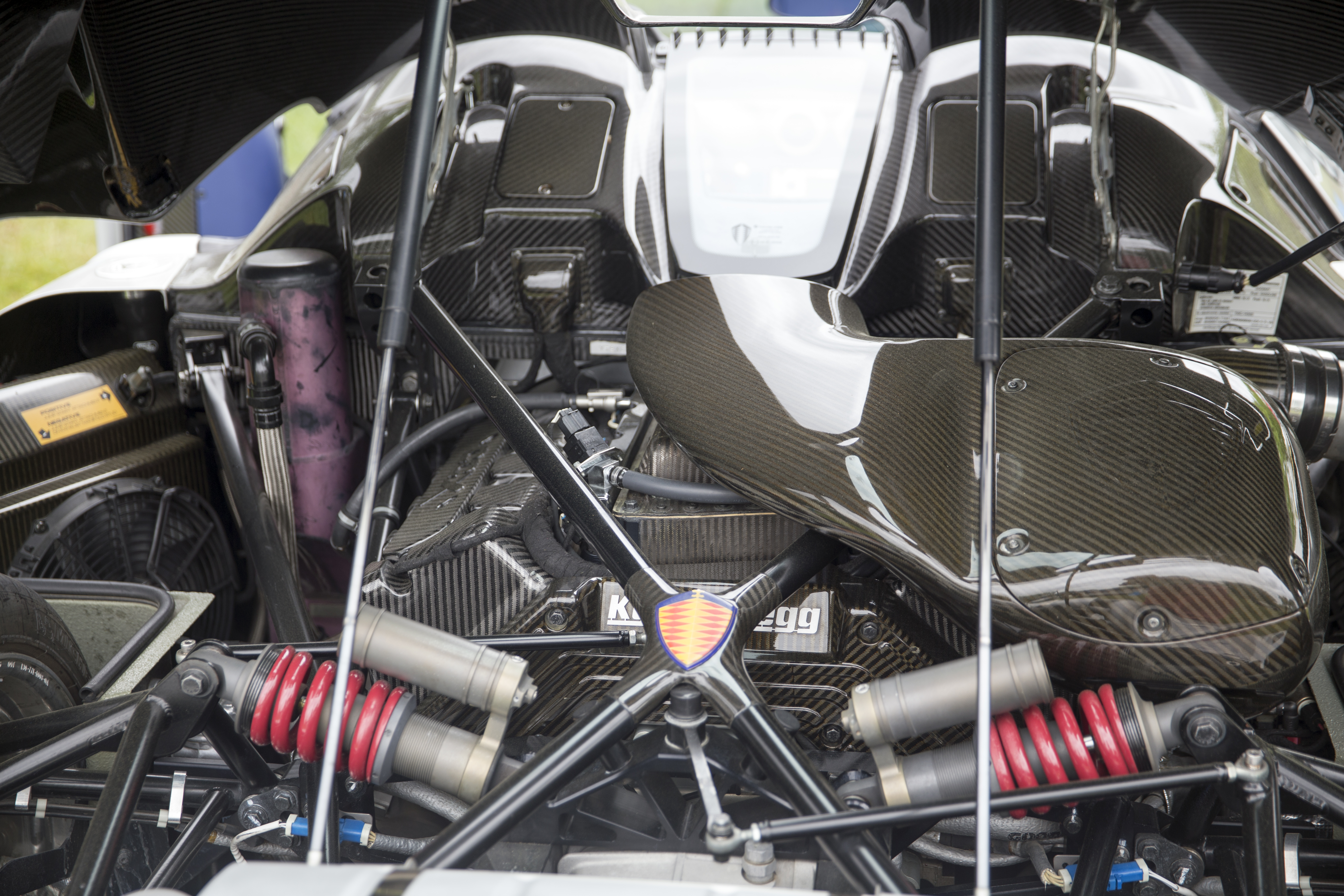
The engine of a Koenigsegg CCX

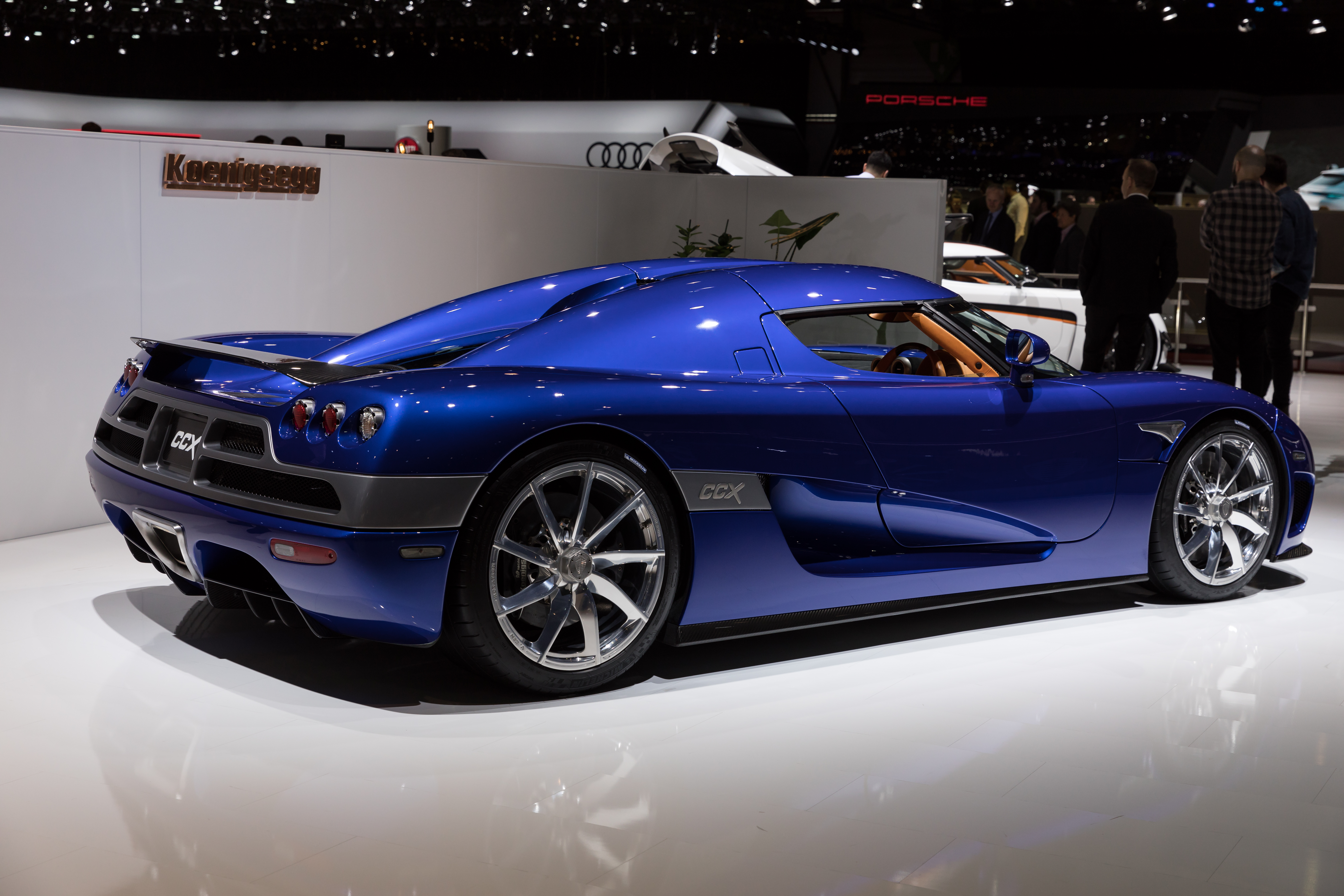
Rear view of the CCX

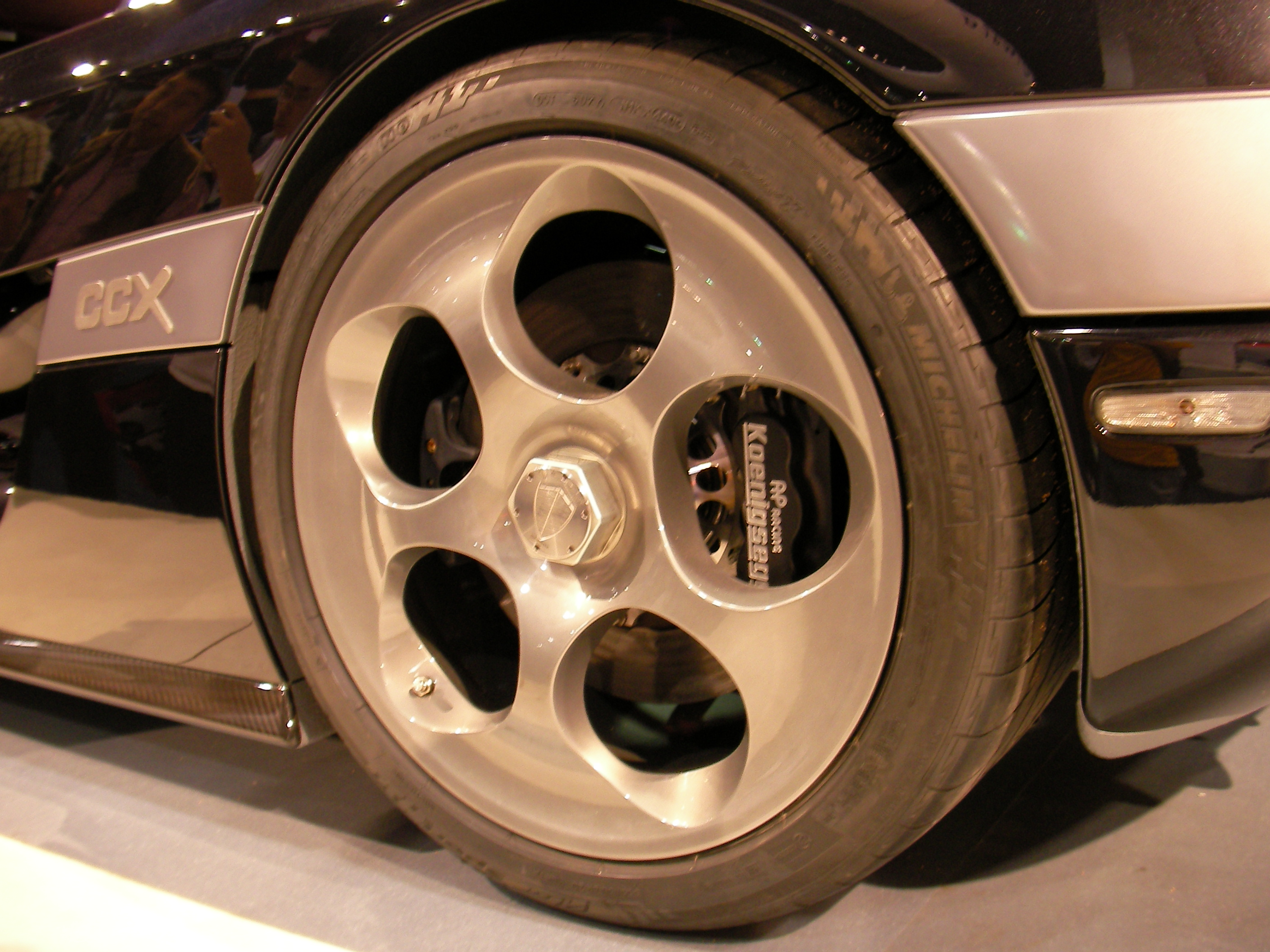
The standard magnesium-alloy rear wheel of a CCX

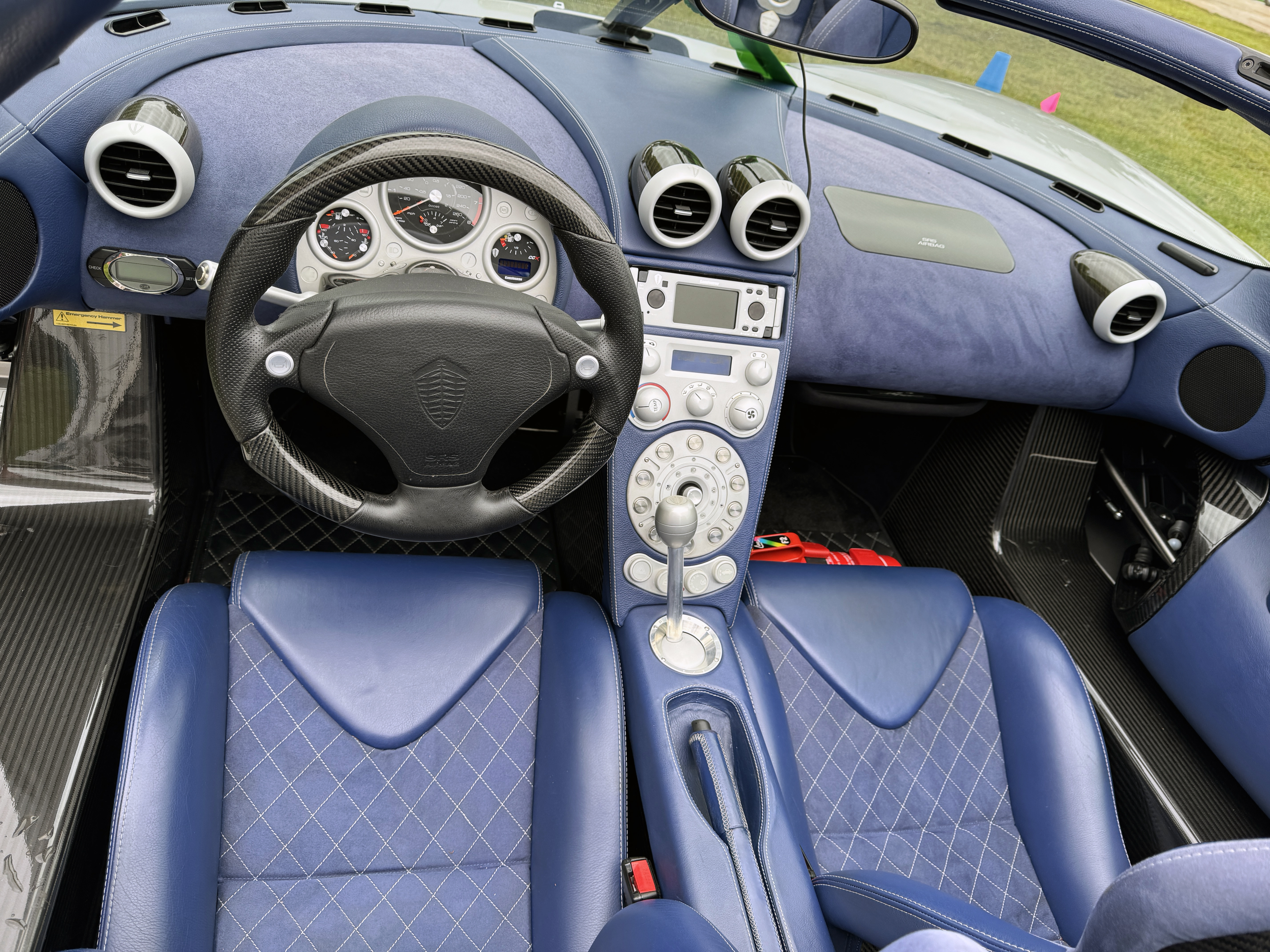
The Koenigsegg CCX' interior (US spec example)

=== Wheels and brakes ===
First in the industry carbon fibre wheels are optional equipment, 3 kilograms (6.6 lb) lighter than the standard forged alloy telephone-dial wheels, both using centre locking nuts. Diameter is 19 inches at the front and 20 inches at the rear equipped with 255/35 Y19 front, 335/30 Y20 rear Michelin Pilot Sport 2 tyres, 8 piston caliper carbon ceramic brakes measuring 380 mm (15 in) in diameter at the front and 6 piston caliper 362 mm (14.3 in) at the rear are optional, saving another 2 kg (4.4 lb) of unsprung weight.

== Variants ==
=== CCXR ===
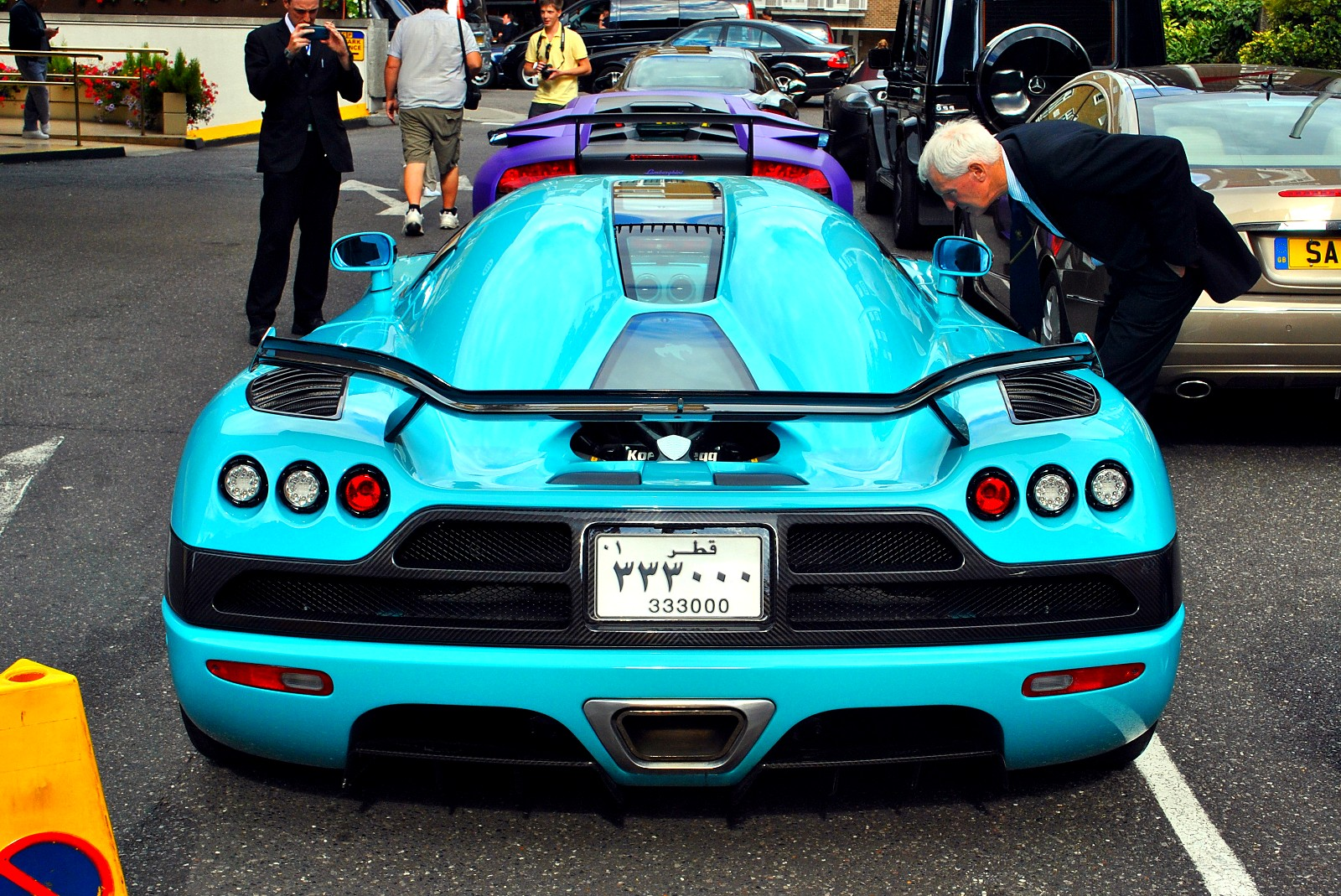
Rear view of the light blue Al-Thani family CCXR Special One in London

Koenigsegg CCX-R
Koenigsegg CCX-R at Goodwood Festival of Speed 2009

The CCXR is a more "environmentally friendly" version of the CCX, powered by the same engine, but converted to use E85 and E100 ethanol fuel, as well as standard 98 octane petrol. The CCXR required modified fuel injectors, upgraded fuel lines and piston rings, and a higher boost setting on the superchargers. In standard form, bodywork of the CCXR features heavily optimized aerodynamics, along with optional diffusers to enhance airflow, including an optional front splitter with an aerodynamic nolder. When run on ethanol, the power increases to 1,018 PS (749 kW; 1,004 hp) at 7000 rpm and 1,060 N⋅m (782 lb⋅ft) of torque at 5600 rpm. This is a direct result of the cooling properties of ethanol in the engine's combustion chambers along with the added boost, made possible by ethanol's higher octane rating when compared to gasoline. Due to the lower specific energy content of ethanol, the CCXR burns slightly more fuel than the CCX with a combined fuel consumption of 22 L/100 km (13 mpg_{‑imp}; 11 mpg_{‑US}) under the EU cycle.

=== CCX Edition, CCXR Edition, CCXR Special Edition ===
At the 2008 Geneva Motor Show, Koenigsegg presented two special edition models, the CCX Edition and the CCXR Edition, both fitted with a remapped, 4.8 L twin-supercharged V8 engine and limited to 2 and 4 units respectively. The modifications to the engine increase the power of the CCX Edition to 900 PS (662 kW; 888 hp) on normal gasoline and 940 N⋅m (693 lb⋅ft) of torque while the CCXR Edition ratings remained unchanged over the CCXR.

The Edition models are more track oriented compared to the standard models, being equipped with stiffer springs and anti-roll bars, new dampers and a lowered chassis, a bare carbon body, unique 11-spoke aluminium wheels with a unique rear wing, and a larger front splitter and side winglets, all of which make the car capable of producing 350 kg (772 lb) of downforce at 250 km/h (155 mph). The interior is also reworked and features; colour matched leather carpets, Koenigsegg Edition side step plates and Edition chronograph instrument cluster. All other extra equipment for the Koenigsegg CCX and CCXR Edition comes as standard which include optional carbon fibre wheels, a rearview camera, Satnav or Bluetooth, amplifiers, and an exhaust system made entirely from inconel.

Later, Koenigsegg also built two CCXR Special Edition cars which when compared to the old CCXR Edition had equipped with the double F1 wing, a revised aero package with a unique and larger front splitter and side winglets, wheel vents on top of the body, as well as Koenigsegg's first F1 Paddleshift system.

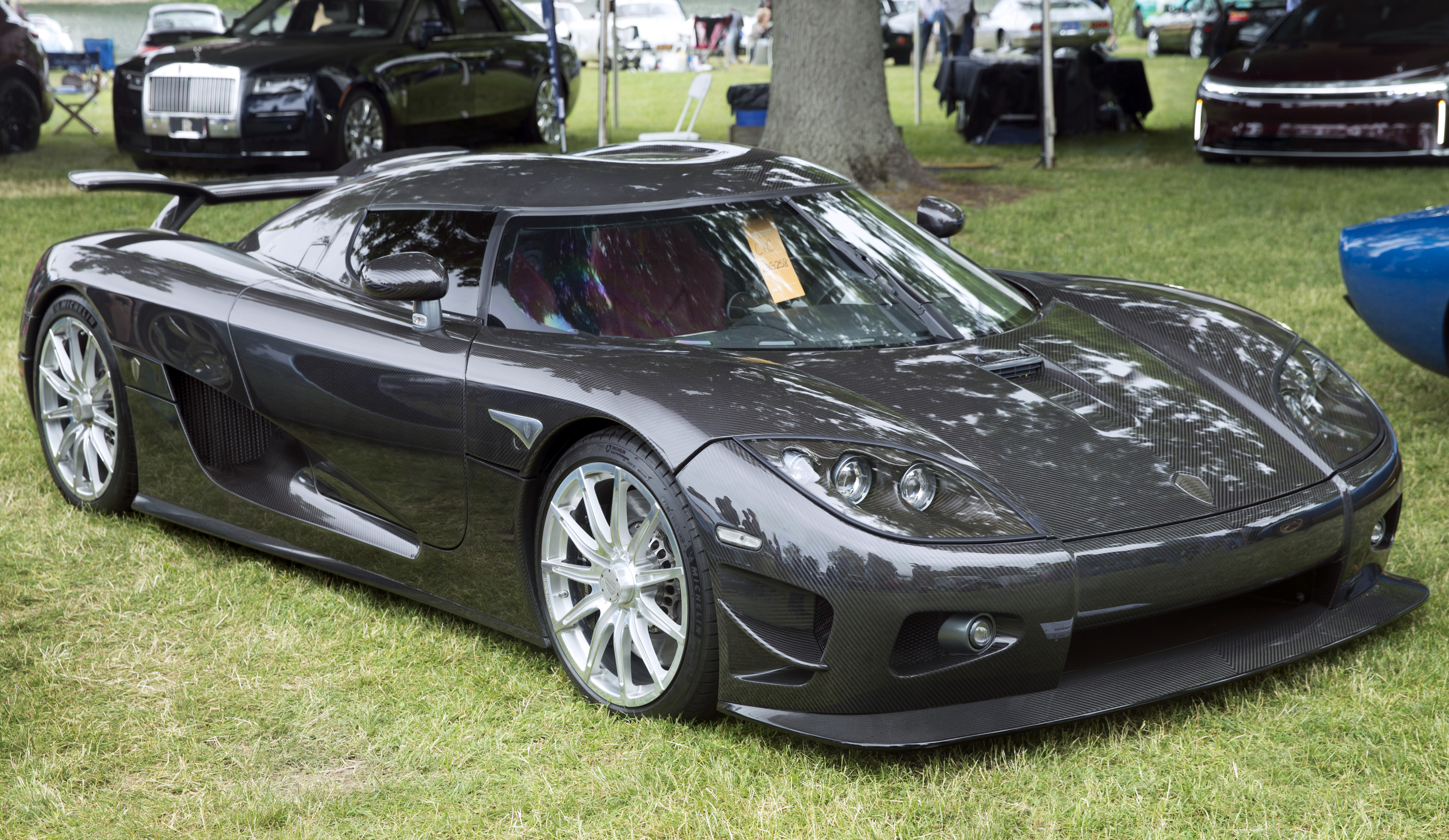
CCX Edition (the first of two built)

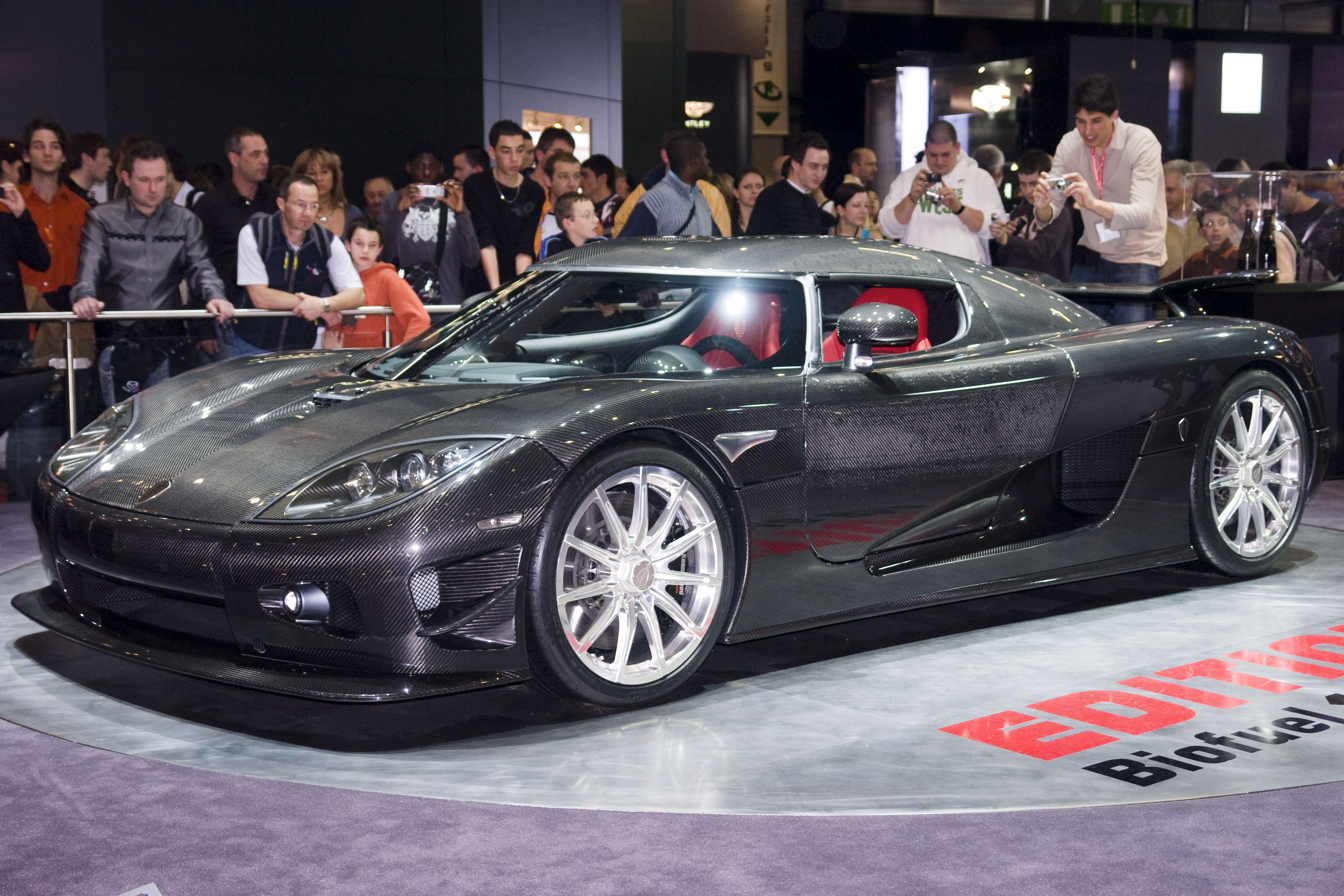
CCXR Edition at the 2008 Geneva Motor Show

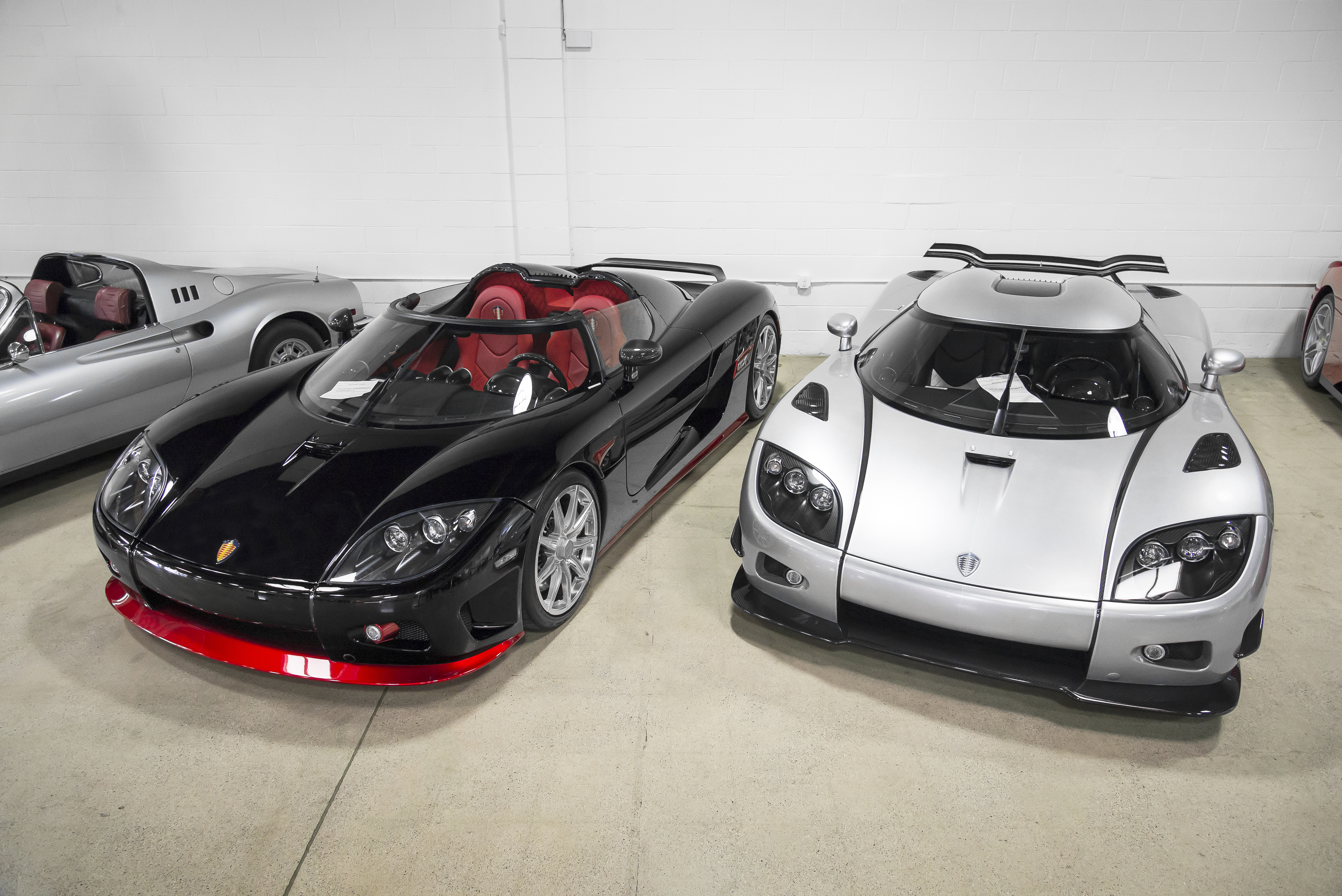
Koenigsegg CCXR SE and CCXR Trevita

=== CCXR Trevita ===
The CCXR Trevita is a limited edition of the Koenigsegg CCXR featuring a diamond weave carbon fibre finish. Trevita is an abbreviation in Swedish and translates into "three whites". The Koenigsegg Proprietary Diamond Weave, fully developed by Koenigsegg, is a new and unique method to manufacture the carbon fibre used for the CCXR Trevita. By utilising this new and unique method, Koenigsegg managed to coat the fibres with a diamond finish. The fibre treatment is conducted carefully in small quantities, prior to further processing the pre-production material.

Initially, three CCXR Trevitas were planned to be produced, however, because of the complexity to make the special diamond weave carbon-fibre, only 2 were ever made, making it one of the rarest vehicles manufactured by Koenigsegg. Both cars featured the Koenigsegg Shimmering Diamond Weave bodywork, twin-deck carbon fibre rear wing, inconel exhaust system, carbon ceramic brakes with ABS, airbags, F1 paddle-shift gearbox, chrono instrument cluster, infotainment system, tire monitoring system and a hydraulic lifting system. The Trevita is also one of the most expensive sports cars, costing US$4.8 million. One was owned by boxer Floyd Mayweather until it was sold in 2017 for $2.6 million.

== Specifications ==
Models	CCX	CCXR	CCX Edition	CCXR Edition/Trevita/Special Edition
Engine configuration: Twin supercharged DOHC 4-valve V8
Displacement	4.7 L (286.8 cu in)		4.8 L (292.9 cu in)	
Power	806 PS (593 kW; 795 hp) at 6900 rpm	1,018 PS (749 kW; 1,004 hp) at 7000 rpm	900 PS (662 kW; 888 hp) at 7000 rpm	1,018 PS (749 kW; 1,004 hp) at 7000 rpm
Torque	920 N⋅m (679 lb⋅ft) at 5700 rpm	1,060 N⋅m (782 lb⋅ft) at 5600 rpm	940 N⋅m (693 lb⋅ft) at 5800 rpm	1,080 N⋅m (797 lb⋅ft) at 5600 rpm

== Motorsport ==
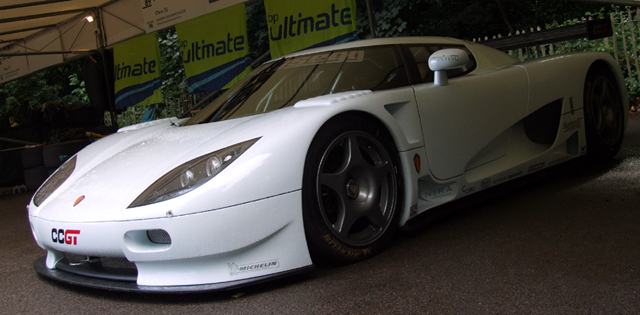
Only existing CCGT at Goodwood 2007

In order to compete in the FIA GT Championship Koenigsegg created the CCGT race car, based on the production CC model range; making its debut appearance at the 2007 Geneva Motor Show and built to comply with the ACO and FIA regulations for the GT1 class.

The CCGT's engine is based on the unit used in the Koenigsegg CCX with the superchargers removed and the capacity increased to 5.0 L to compensate for the loss of power. The CCGT had over 600 kg downforce and over 600 hp normally aspirated, racing restricted hp. Due to the already lightweight construction of the road-going model it was based on, the weight was easily reduced under the minimum 1,100 kg (2,425 lb), which means that the Ballast can be placed optimally in order to meet the mandatory weight.

Two months after the car completed its first shakedown runs, the FIA GT1 regulations were suddenly changed, according to the altered regulations, carbon monocoques were disallowed and there had to be a minimum of 350 road cars produced per year of the model that was to compete, something that Koenigsegg was unable to achieve, prohibiting the CCGT from racing.

On 14 July 2023, the CCGT was sold for £3,319,000 (inclusive of buyer's premium) in Bonhams Goodwood Festival of Speed auction.

== Production and chassis numbers ==
The CCX was produced between 2006 and 2010 and the total production amounted to 49 cars (30 CCX, 9 CCXR, 6 CCX/CCXR Edition, 2 CCXR Special Edition and 2 CCXR Trevita). One of them was a CCX used for Crash tests and the other was a CCXR which is still a factory test car. Some CCX cars have later been upgraded to CCXR-specifications.

Vehicle Identification Number	Model	Paint	Note	Nickname
012	CCGT	White		
030	CCX	Evolution Grey		
031	CCX prototype	Satin Black	Used as a test and certification car by Koenigsegg, some aspects differing from production CCX.	
032	CCX	Koenigsegg Royal Blue		
033	CCX	Dark metallic blue		
034	CCX	Storm Black		
035	CCX	Unpainted carbon	Crash test vehicle, destroyed.	
036	CCX	Lava Orange		
037	CCX	Storm Black		
038	CCXR	Storm Black		
039	CCX	White		
040	CCX	White		
041	CCXR	Storm Black		
042	CCX	Dolphin Grey		
043	CCX	Storm Black		
044	CCX	Yellow		
045	CCX	Purple carbon		
046	CCX	Storm Black		
047	CCX	White and carbon fiber		
048	CCX	Storm Black		
049	CCX	Silver		
050	CCX	Lava Orange		
051	CCX	Lava Orange		
052	CCXR Edition	Carbon fiber		
053	CCX	Red		
054	CCXR Edition	Carbon fiber		
055	CCX	Carbon fiber		Big Brother
056	CCXR Edition	Carbon fiber		
057	CCX	Sapphire Blue Metallic		
058	CCX Edition	Carbon fiber		
059	CCXR	Swedish Snow Pearl White	Upgraded to CCXF standard. Destroyed in a crash.	
060	CCXR	Dolphin Grey		
061	CCX Edition	Carbon fiber		
062	CCXR	Jet Black and Candy Apple Red		
063	CCX	Pearl White		
064	CCXR	Storm Black		
065	CCXR	Grey		
066	CCX	Silver		
067	CCX	Candy Apple Red and carbon fiber	Destroyed in a crash in Mexico.	Custom Vision
068	CCXR Special Edition	Carbon fiber		
069	CCXR	Lava Orange		
070	CCX	White and carbon fiber		
071	CCXR Trevita	White carbon		
072	CCXR Special Edition	Carbon fiber		
073	CCXR	Al-Thani Blue	Ordered with custom color and other bespoke options for member of the Qatari royal family Al-Thani. Destroyed in a crash in Mexico, then rebuilt and renamed CCXR EVO Special One.	CCXR EVO Special One
074	CCXR Edition	Carbon fiber		
075	CCXR Trevita	White carbon		
076	CCXR	Orange		Platinuss
078	CCX	Silver		

== Awards and recognition ==
- 2009 Best Performing Green Exotic, duPont Registry
- One of the 10 Most Beautiful Cars by Forbes magazine

In 2007, the CCX was the fastest car to complete Top Gear's Power Lap with a time of 1:17.6 (until it was beaten by the Ascari A10 with a time of 1:17.3). The car originally lapped the circuit in 1:20.4, but was then fitted with an optional rear wing to provide downforce after The Stig spun it off the track at 130 mph due to a power steering failure. The Stig purportedly recommended this modification, predicting that the car would then be the fastest ever round Top Gear's track but Koenigsegg later stated that the improvement was due to adjustments to the chassis and suspension settings and not the addition of the rear spoiler. Despite this, the Stig's spoiler-idea remained the credited reason for the improved lap time. The name of the car on the lap board is "Koeniggggsenisseggsegnignigsegigiseg CCX2 with the Top Gear wing", reportedly because none of the Top Gear presenters knew how to spell Koenigsegg, and also poking fun at the long and hard pronunciation of the manufacturer's name.
