= NASCAR Heat 3 =

2018 racing video game

- Cover art featuring Hendrick Motorsports drivers
- Developer: Monster Games
- Publisher: 704Games
- Series: NASCAR Heat
- Engine: Unity
- Platforms: Microsoft Windows; PlayStation 4 Xbox One
- Release: NA: September 7, 2018; EU: September 7, 2018
- Genre: Racing
- Modes: Single-player, multiplayer

NASCAR Heat 3 is a racing video game simulating the 2018 NASCAR Cup Series and feeder competitions. It was developed by Monster Games and published by 704Games. It is the sequel to NASCAR Heat 2, and was released in North America and Europe on September 7, 2018 for the PlayStation 4, Xbox One and Microsoft Windows via Steam. Hendrick Motorsports drivers Jimmie Johnson (his first cover since NASCAR The Game 2011 and NASCAR 06 Total Team Control), Chase Elliott, Alex Bowman and William Byron are featured on the cover. The game features a new fictional Dirt late model series titled the Xtreme Dirt tour which is part of an enhanced career mode.

== Gameplay ==
=== Career ===
Like NASCAR Heat 2, the career mode option for the game includes the option to play in the Monster Energy NASCAR Cup Series, NASCAR Xfinity Series and NASCAR Camping World Truck Series. Additions for the third installment include a new fictional Dirt late model series and the option to manage your own team in NASCAR national series competition. The Xtreme Dirt Tour emulates the feel of local dirt track racing, with a variety of new tracks. Notable new tracks include a dirt version of Bristol Motor Speedway (which before it was run in both the Cup and Truck series in 2021 and is only playable for the Xtreme Dirt Tour) and tracks that originally featured in NASCAR: Dirt to Daytona that have received graphical updates. The Charlotte Motor Speedway road course is also available to play at in the Bank of America Roval 400 event.

=== Esports ===
In 2019, NASCAR, the Race Team Alliance and 704Games created the eNASCAR Heat Pro League, an esports league for NH3. Interested players needed to qualify for a draft through a special set of online races. The draft was made up of teams owned by prominent NASCAR figures. Efforts were made to bring in nontraditional NASCAR demographics, such as shorter races.

=== Downloadable content ===
As part of the cover deal, Hendrick Motorsports released free DLC packs after the game's release. Paid DLC packs were available from publisher 704Games.

=== Online servers ===
On April 30, 2021, the online servers for NASCAR Heat 2 and NASCAR Heat 3 were shut down.

== Reception ==
Reception

Aggregate score
Aggregator	Score
Metacritic	(PS4) 64/100 (XONE) 68/100

Review scores
Publication	Score
Game Informer	7.5/10
Hardcore Gamer	3.5/5

NASCAR Heat 3 received "mixed or average" reviews according to review aggregator Metacritic.

Matthew Kato of Game Informer stated that while the game did have the needed NASCAR feel to it, it was lacking just about everywhere else, including rivalries, paint schemes, graphics, improved yet faulty AI, online, gameplay, and career mode.

=== Awards ===
The game was nominated for "Game, Franchise Racing" at the National Academy of Video Game Trade Reviewers Awards.
