= GP (magazine) =

British medical magazine

GP (magazine), now GP Online, was a fortnightly (weekly) magazine for general practitioners (GPs) in the UK. Originally called General Practitioner, GP has been published by Haymarket Media Group, which is owned by Lord Michael Heseltine, since 1963.

The title contains news, features and opinion articles about clinical, financial and political issues of relevance to GPs across the UK: The magazine also incorporates Medeconomics, which was a separate, stand-alone title until December 2005.

GP’s website GPonline.com launched in December 2010, replacing Healthcare Republic considered an invaluable education resource for nurses and General Practitioners.

The publication's regular columnists include Dr Mary Selby and Dr Liam Farrell.

GP also produces conferences and a series of DVDs on consultation skills, both of which launched in 2010.

GP is no longer in print, going fully digital in July 2015.
