= Motorsport.tv =

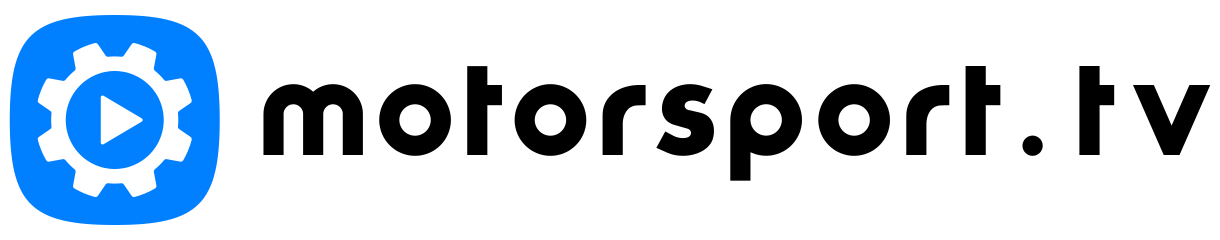
- Country: United States
- Broadcast area: Worldwide
- Headquarters: Miami, Florida

Programming
- Languages: English, French
- Picture format: 1080i HDTV

Ownership
- Owner: Motorsport Network

History
- Launched: September 2018; 7 years ago
- Closed: 31 January 2026; 2 months ago

Links
- Website: www.motorsport.tv

Motorsport.tv was a global streaming OTT platform specialized in motor racing and motoring content, live and on demand launched in September 2018. It was a fully integrated video ecosystem developed and operated by Motorsport Network to specifically cater to different motor racing and automotive audiences.

Motorsport.tv distributed globally over many different digital platforms. It offered both subscription content (SVOD) under the label Motorsport.tv Premium, and free to view ad-supported content (AVOD). As of 2023, Motorsport.tv contained 14,000+ hours long and short form on demand videos 35,000+ video titles available online and livestream more than 1,200 events yearly.

== History ==
Motorsport.tv logo used from 2017 to 2022

In November 2016, Motorsport Network had acquired Motors TV. On 1 March 2017, Motors TV was rebranded to become Motorsport.tv. On that same day, the HD version of the channel was launched.

In September 2018 it became clear that the Motorsport.tv linear channel would close on 30 September 2018 in both SD and HD versions. From that date, the service switched to online-streaming only. In September 2018, Motorsport.tv launched its version 1 on the web, as a subscription OTT service only, with 800 hours of VOD content and 12 racing series live. It started its partnership with the Automobile Club de l'Ouest to stream the full archive of the famed 24 Hours of Le Mans.

October 2018, it launched its version 1 on mobile devices with both iOS and Android applications. In January 2019, it presented its first connected TV app, Apple TV.

In February 2019, Motorsport.tv version 2 was launched, adding free-to-view content to its subscription service, now branded as Motorsport.tv Premium. In March 2019, several connected TV applications were launched, such as Amazon Fire TV, Roku and Android TV. In April 2019, several broadcasting partnerships were announced, including livestreaming of the Japanese Super GT series (with exclusive global rights), FIA World Endurance Championship, Super Formula, all SRO sanctioned series, FIM Endurance World Championship and more.

In December 2019 several content archives were published, taking the number of VOD content to 2,000. More than 600 events were streamed live in 2019.

In January 2020, multiple FIM racing series announced with global live rights, such as SuperEnduro, X-Trial, etc. In February 2020, it was announced that the feature movie Motorsport Heroes will be distributed on Motorsport.tv, with global rights.

April 2020: the Motorsport.tv partner channels program was launched, with many racing series, manufacturers and content creators starting their own channel on Motorsport.tv. Among many official channel partners: Ferrari, Mercedes, Porsche, Audi, NASCAR and more. In March 2021, more global rights to livestream racing series were announced, such as the Brazilian Stock Car Pro Series.

In November 2022, an updated version of the Motorsport.tv platform was released, with many user experience improvements as well as an updated visual identity. In December 2022, over 1,200 live race events were streamed on Motorsport.tv in 2022. The video content was announced as 14,000 hours and over 35,000 video titles.

In January 2023, Motorsport.tv entered the fast-growing Free Ad-Supported Streaming TV (FAST) distribution model with the launch of the Motorsport.tv FAST channel. The first streaming partners announced were SportsTribal, TCL, Sports TV, Local Now, TheGrio, Samsung TV Plus, and Plex.

On 23 December 2025, Motorsport.tv announced that its streaming platform will shut down on 31 January 2026, with user subscriptions and select content including the Duke Video archive being transferred to Autosport, and livestream content, including Super Formula and Super GT coverage, being discontinued.

== Series broadcast ==
=== Single-seater ===
Super Formula, Formula One, Formula E, Formula 4, Formula Regional, Formula Renault 3.5 Series, British Formula Three, Superleague Formula, Formula Two, European F3 Open, Eurocup Formula Renault 2.0, Grand Prix de Pau, GP3 Series, British Formula Ford

=== Endurance and GT ===
IMSA, European Le Mans Series, FIA World Endurance Championship, International GT Open, GT Cup, ADAC GT Masters, FIA GT3, Blancpain Endurance Series, Britcar, British GT, Dutch Supercar Challenge, Ferrari Challenge Europe, Porsche Supercup, Superstars GT Sprint, Bathurst 12 Hours, Dubai 24 Hours, Malaysia Merdeka Endurance Race, Le Mans Classic, Spa 24 Hours, Belcar, GT4 European Cup, SPEED Euro Series

=== Rally and rallycross ===
World Rally Championship, European Rally Championship, Red Bull Global Rallycross, Rallycross Challenge Europe, Rallye International du Valais, British Historic Rally Championship, British Rallycross Championship, French Rallycross Championship, Irish Tarmac Rally Championship, Irish National Rally Championship, Irish Forest Rally Championship, MSA Asphalt Rally Championship, Finnish F-Cup Rally, Belgian Rally, Asia-Pacific Rally Championship, Canadian Rally Championship

=== Motorcycle, motocross and supercross ===
FIM SuperEnduro World Championship, FIM EnduroGP World Championship, FIM X-Trial World Championship, FIM Trial GP, FIM Supermoto World Championship, FIM World Sidecar Cross, FIM Superbike World Championship, Italian Superbike Championship, Spanish Motorcycle Championship, FIM Motocross World Championship, Supercross de Bercy, AMA Motocross, AMA Supercross, Night of the Jumps, Endurance FIM World Championship, FIM Sidecar World Championship, FIM Ice Speedway Gladiators

=== Other (live and on demand) ===
FIA European Truck Racing Championship, FIA Karting Europe, FIA European Rally Championship, FIA Motorsport Games, Race of Champions, Formula Drift, BRSCC Porsche Championship, Lotus Cup Europe, JDM Allstars, King of Europe Drift Series, EFRA European Championships, UK Karting, Fun Cup, GP3R

== See also ==
- List of sports television channels
- Broadcasting of sports events
