= Cancer Therapy Advisor =

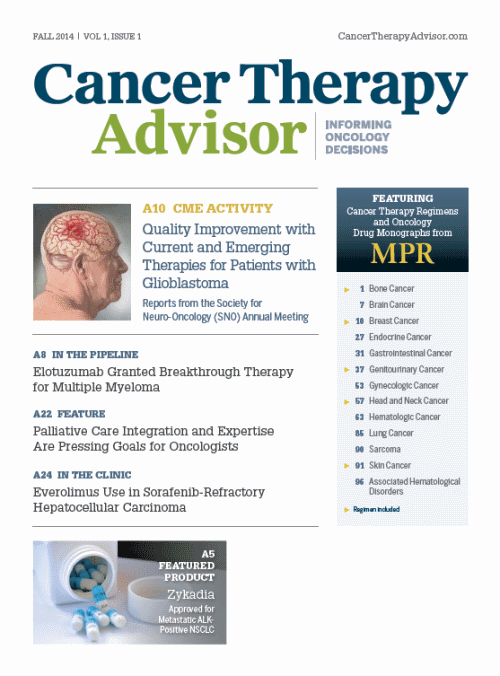
- Front cover of Cancer Therapy Advisor inaugural Fall issue
- Frequency: Quarterly
- Company: Haymarket Media
- Country: United States
- Language: English
- Website: www.cancertherapyadvisor.com
- ISSN: 2375-558X
- OCLC: 893424999

Cancer Therapy Advisor (formerly Chemotherapy Advisor) is an online resource and quarterly medical news publication for oncology healthcare professionals, with updated treatment regimens for patients with cancer and live medical conference coverage.

== Background ==
Launched in January 2012, Cancer Therapy Advisor is owned by Haymarket Oncology, a subsidiary of Haymarket Media based in New York City and New Jersey.
