= NASCAR Heat 2 =

2017 racing video game

- Cover art featuring Kyle Busch
- Developer: Monster Games
- Publisher: 704Games
- Series: NASCAR Heat
- Platforms: PlayStation 4 Windows; Xbox One
- Release: September 12, 2017
- Genre: Racing
- Modes: Single-player, multiplayer

NASCAR Heat 2 is a racing video game by Monster Games and published by 704Games. It is the sequel to NASCAR Heat Evolution, and was released on September 12, 2017, for the PlayStation 4, Xbox One and Windows via Steam. Kyle Busch is featured on the cover. The NASCAR Camping World Truck Series and the NASCAR Xfinity Series are featured in the game for the first time since EA Sports' 2008 release, NASCAR 09. Truck and Xfinity stand-alone tracks, including Eldora Speedway and Gateway Motorsports Park (before it was added to the cup schedule in 2022) are also featured. All three series are playable online, and in career mode, the player can ascend the ranks to conquer the Monster Energy NASCAR Cup Series.

NASCAR Heat 2 was also the working title of NASCAR: Dirt to Daytona, as logos for it appear in some menus of the 2002 game.

== Gameplay ==
Career mode gives players the ability to start in the NASCAR Camping World Truck Series and work up towards the Monster Energy NASCAR Cup Series. The player can use their own car or use a driver on a team. In the beginning, users choose a driver from hot seat offers in the Truck Series and progress up the ranks to Cup. Users can also play a single-season championship simulation. Also included are online multiplayer, with races up to 40 players, or local split-screen multiplayer. Challenges featuring different tracks and drivers are also included in the game; all are voiced by Claire B. Lang.

On April 30, 2021, the online servers for NASCAR Heat 2 and NASCAR Heat 3 were shut down.

== Drivers ==
NASCAR Heat 2 features drivers from all three of NASCAR's national series in the game (42 MENCS drivers, 43 NXS drivers, and 32 NCWTS drivers). However, there are some notable omissions, including Beard Motorsports with driver Brendan Gaughan in the Monster Energy NASCAR Cup Series, and all GMS Racing drivers in both the NASCAR Xfinity Series and NASCAR Camping World Truck Series, excluding Justin Haley. The driver rosters for the Monster Energy NASCAR Cup Series, NASCAR Xfinity Series, and NASCAR Camping World Truck Series have been confirmed by 704Games. In a patch released in October, 704 added all remaining NASCAR Next drivers including Hailie Deegan and Chase Purdy.

The highest-placing Toyota driver in the Sprint All-Star Race was selected as the cover driver; Last Year: Carl Edwards won the cover driver competition with a fourth-place finish. He retired from NASCAR on January 9, 2017, and handed his ride to Daniel Suárez. That year the eligible drivers were Kyle Busch, Denny Hamlin, Matt Kenseth, and Martin Truex Jr. Busch won the cover driver competition with a win in the NASCAR All-Star finishing 2nd in Stage 2 in that event and winning the event.

== Reception ==
Reception

Aggregate score
Aggregator	Score
Metacritic	(PS4) 66/100 (XONE) 59/100

Review scores
Publication	Score
Game Informer	7/10
Hardcore Gamer	4/5
Polygon	7.5/10

=== Accolades ===
The game was nominated for "Game, Franchise Racing" at the 17th Annual National Academy of Video Game Trade Reviewers Awards.
