= Monthly Prescribing Reference =

- Categories: Health Care
- Frequency: Monthly
- Circulation: 400,000 healthcare professionals / month
- First issue: 1984
- Company: Haymarket Media
- Country: United States
- Language: English
- Website: www.empr.com
- ISSN: 0883-0266
- OCLC: 232359716

Monthly Prescribing Reference (MPR) is an online medical website and monthly drug reference publication based in New York City.

== Background ==
Prescribing Reference, Inc., was established in 1984 by Haymarket Medical, a subsidiary of Haymarket Media. MPR was launched in 1985 and is PRI's first and main publication.
