= Renal & Urology News =

American medical news publication

- Editor: Jody Charnow
- Categories: Health Care
- Frequency: Monthly
- Circulation: 16,000 physicians / month
- First issue: 2002
- Company: Haymarket Media
- Country: United States
- Language: English
- Website: www.renalandurologynews.com
- ISSN: 1550-9478
- OCLC: 321350119

Renal & Urology News is an online medical news website and monthly print publication based in New York City that reports on clinical news for nephrologists and urologists with coverage focusing on medical conferences and papers in peer-reviewed journals.

== Background ==
Launched in 2002, Renal & Urology News is owned by Haymarket Medical, a subsidiary of Haymarket Media.
