= 704Games =

American video game developer

704Games Company
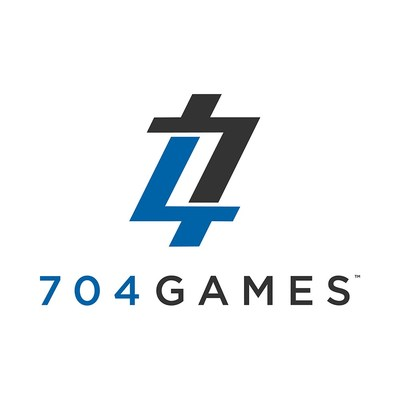
- Current logo, in use since 2017
- Formerly: Dusenberry Martin Racing
- Type: Incorporation
- Industry: Video games
- Founded: January 2015; 11 years ago
- Headquarters: Charlotte, North Carolina, United States
- Key people: Tom Dusenberry (co-founder); Ed Martin (co-founder); Colin Smith (President); Paul Brooks
- Parent: Motorsport Network
- Website: nascarheat.com/about-us/

704Games Company (formerly known as Dusenberry Martin Racing) is an American video game developer and publisher based in Charlotte, North Carolina. The company acquired the license to be the exclusive developer of NASCAR video games in January 2015 and has since released six console games and a mobile game.

The company has a long-standing relationship with the National Association for Stock Car Auto Racing (NASCAR) and has the exclusive rights to develop and publish video games featuring the NASCAR brand.

== History ==
Dusenberry Martin Racing logo

704Games was formed as Dusenberry Martin Racing in January 2015, a subsidiary of HC2 Holdings, who acquired the license to develop NASCAR video games from Eutechnyx that month. As a result of the acquisition, DMR received NASCAR '15, a video game that Eutechnyx had been developing. Dusenberry Martin Racing secured $8,000,000 in equity capital in April.

NASCAR '15 was published and released by DMR on May 22, 2015. The company was also beginning the development of its first video game, NASCAR Heat Evolution while collaborating with Monster Games. The game was released on September 13, 2016. In 2017, NASCAR Heat Mobile was released as a soft launch exclusive to Canada on March 8 and was released in the US on April 24. In the same year, a sequel to NASCAR Heat Evolution, NASCAR Heat 2, was released on September 12, and was followed by NASCAR Heat 3 in the following year on September 7.

In 2017, DMR rebranded to 704Games (taken from Charlotte's area code (704)) and hired former NASCAR Media Group President, NASCAR Senior Vice President, and DMR chairman Paul Brooks as CEO.

By August 2018, Motorsport Network began to invest in 704Games, and in the following years Motorsport Network made a majority investment in 704Games. Additionally, Colin Smith, former CEO of Motorsport Network, replaced Ed Martin as President of 704Games while Martin began to direct 704Games' esports initiatives. Paul Brooks moved into a non-executive chairman role. As part of the Motorsport Network deal (which had now created and spun-off its games division called 'Motorsport Games'), NASCAR extended its video game and esports license with 704Games through 2029. Subsequent NASCAR games published by the company listed Motorsport Games as the developer following its complete takeover.

== Games ==
- NASCAR '15
- NASCAR Heat Evolution
- NASCAR Heat Mobile
- NASCAR Heat 2
- NASCAR Heat 3
- NASCAR Heat 4
- NASCAR Heat 5
  - NASCAR Heat Ultimate Edition+
