= Claire B. Lang =

American radio talk show host

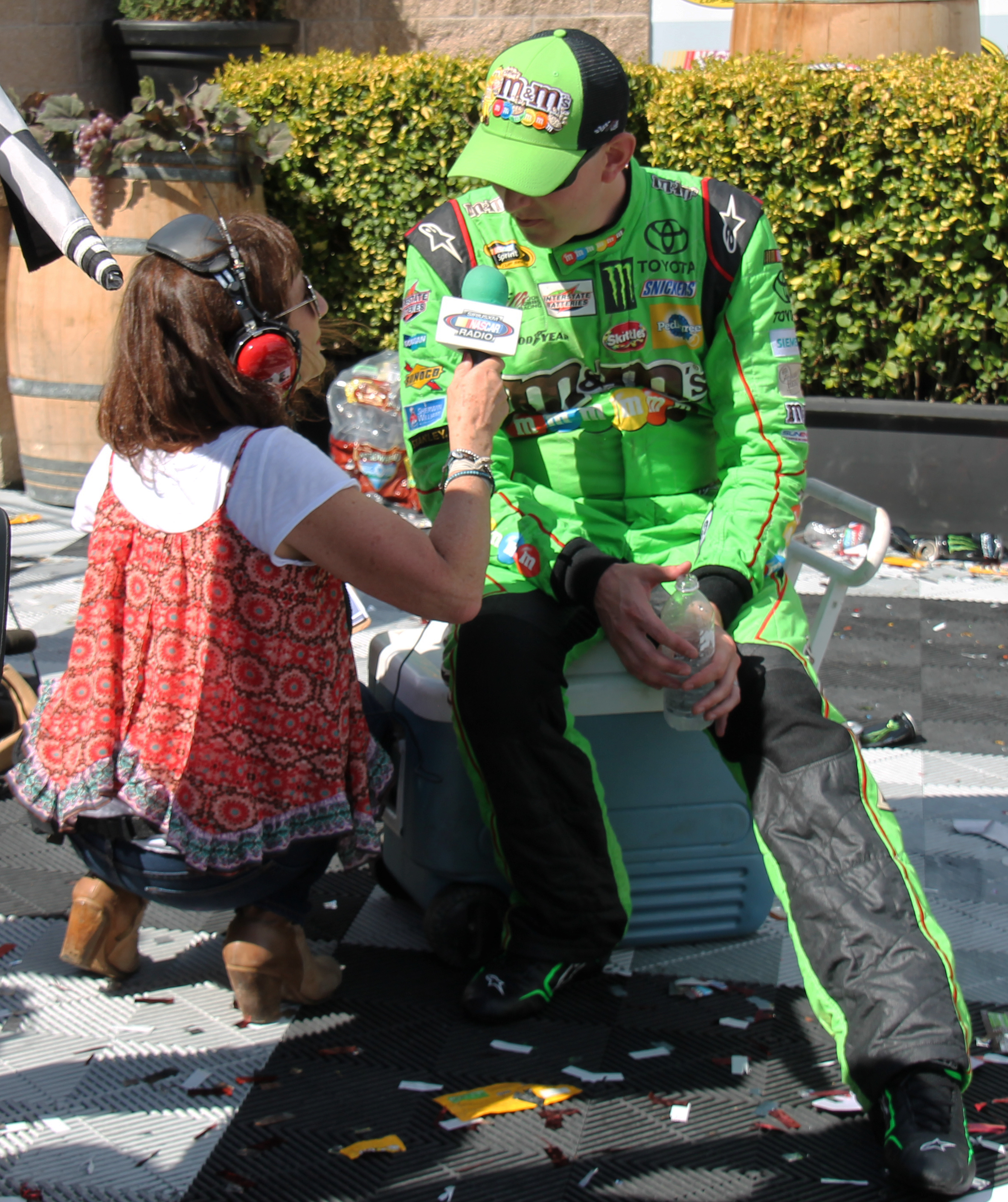
- Lang interviewing Kyle Busch after he won the 2015 Toyota/Save Mart 350
- Education: University of Wisconsin–Eau Claire
- Occupation: Radio personality

Claire B. Lang is an American talk show host. Since 1996, she has reported for NASCAR. She last hosted SiriusXM Satellite Radio's "Dialed In" until the conclusion of the 2023 season. She was one of the first women to become a sports radio host. She has been called the "First Lady" of NASCAR Radio.

Beyond her work as a radio host, Lang has appeared on The John Boy & Billy Show, TBS, Fox Television, Inside NASCAR, and Sky Sports in Europe. She attended the University of Wisconsin-Eau Claire, graduating in 1976. She voices the narrator on all the main challenges in the 2017 video game NASCAR Heat 2.

Lang is the daughter of John Bennett, the silver medalist in long jump at the 1956 Summer Olympics.
