= NASCAR Heat Evolution =

2016 racing video game

- Cover art featuring Carl Edwards
- Developer: Monster Games
- Publisher: Dusenberry Martin Racing
- Series: NASCAR Heat
- Engine: Unity
- Platforms: Microsoft Windows; PlayStation 4 Xbox One
- Release: NA: September 13, 2016
- Genre: Racing, Sports
- Modes: Single player, multiplayer

NASCAR Heat Evolution is a racing video game developed by Monster Games and published by 704Games. The game was released in North America on September 13, 2016 for the PlayStation 4, Xbox One and Microsoft Windows. It is the follow-up to the 2015 release of NASCAR '15 Victory Edition and the first developed by Monster Games since NASCAR: Dirt to Daytona was released in 2002.

== Gameplay ==
The game features all 23 tracks from the 2016 NASCAR Sprint Cup Series schedule, as well as drivers from several teams like Childress, Ganassi, Gibbs, Hendrick, Petty, Penske, Roush and Stewart-Haas. A November update added the drivers of the 2016 NASCAR Next class, such as Todd Gilliland, Ty Majeski, Harrison Burton and others, though those drivers are only available in quick race mode. NASCAR Heat Evolution also includes a dynamic AI and Speed Rating system that matches the players skill level. Several different modes are built in the game, including a quick race mode, career mode, and a challenge mode. In the challenge mode, players attempt to match or exceed current NASCAR records.

== Development ==
In 2015, Dusenberry Martin Racing, then known as DMi Games, acquired the NASCAR license from Eutechnyx in a deal lasting through 2020. The company's President Ed Martin formerly worked for Papyrus Design Group, Hasbro Interactive, EA Sports and Eutechnyx, who developed the NASCAR Racing, NASCAR Heat, EA Sports NASCAR and NASCAR The Game series, respectively. CEO Tom Dusenberry was the founder and president of Hasbro Interactive.

== Drivers ==
On May 20, DMR officially announced the game at Charlotte Motor Speedway, partnering with Monster Games, who had developed NASCAR Heat and NASCAR: Dirt to Daytona. Monster President and Evolution lead developer Richard Garcia was a former member of the Heat design team. Drivers Joey Logano, Ryan Blaney, Brad Keselowski, Matt Tifft, and Ben Kennedy were hired by DMR to help develop the game. The game is the first NASCAR game to be released on eighth generation consoles, with releases for the PlayStation 4 and Xbox One.

To determine the cover driver, the highest-placing Toyota driver in the Sprint All-Star Race was selected; the eligible drivers were Kyle Busch, Carl Edwards, Denny Hamlin, Matt Kenseth, and Martin Truex Jr. Edwards won the cover driver competition with a fourth-place finish.

A sequel to the game, released fall 2017, was released on September 12. The move came as DMR rebranded as 704Games.

== Reception ==
Reception

Aggregate score
Aggregator	Score
Metacritic	66/100

Review scores
Publication	Score
Game Informer	7/10
Polygon	7.5/10

The game received lackluster reviews from critics, who lamented the game's inability to keep users interested and the lack of improvement in online lobbies. Forbes gave the game a 5.8 out of 10, citing a "worthless" career mode. FanSided gave the game a four out of 10, saying that it "came in dead last".
