= Marketing (British magazine) =

British monthly trade magazine

- Categories: Trade magazine
- Frequency: Monthly
- Founded: 1931
- Final issue: May 2016
- Company: Haymarket Business Media
- Country: United Kingdom
- Based in: London
- Language: English
- Website: www.marketingmagazine.co.uk

Marketing was a British monthly trade magazine founded in 1931, and owned by Haymarket Media Group. It existed until May 2016.

== History and profile ==
Marketing was founded in 1931. Haymarket Business Media consolidated their marketing communications portfolio resulting in Marketing being merged into an expanded Campaign magazine. The last print edition was published in May 2016.
