= DuPont Registry =

Magazine publishing companies of the United States

duPont REGISTRY
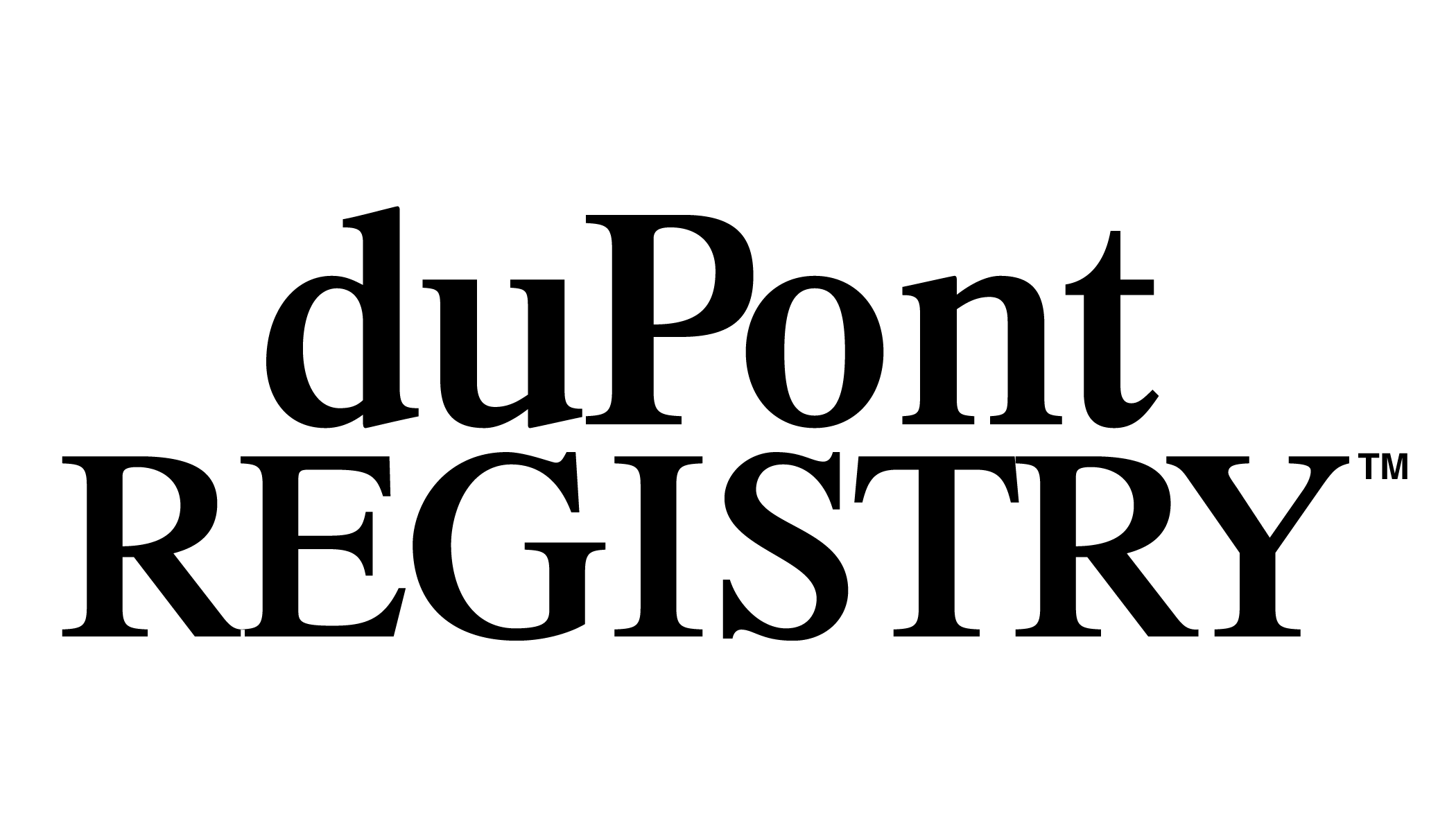
- 12th Anniversary Issue
- Website type: Online marketplace
- Available in: English
- Founded: 1985
- Headquarters: {{{location_country}}}
- Owner: Driven Lifestyle
- Creators: Thomas L. duPont; Steven B. Chapman
- Website: dupontregistry.com
- Commercial: Yes
- Current status: Active
- ISSN: 0890-362X

duPont REGISTRY is an American luxury lifestyle brand and high-end automobile digital marketplace founded in 1985. Originally established as a luxury lifestyle magazine, duPont REGISTRY has evolved to become a digital platform for luxury items, while maintaining its print publication.

== History ==
The original idea was conceived and presented to Thomas L. duPont by Steven B. Chapman and Clinton W. Sly. Thomas duPont bought one-third of the company and he provided the initial funding. Chapman, Sly and duPont were equal owners. The firm's headquarters are in Clearwater, Florida. Their former Tampa location was also home to a luxury car showroom. As of 2003, their average reader had a net worth of US$2.2 million. The flagship publication is duPont Registry: A Buyers Gallery of Fine Automobiles, which launched in 1985. Other titles include duPont Registry: A Buyers Gallery of Fine Homes, duPont Registry: A Buyers Gallery of Fine Boats, and duPont Registry Tampa Bay. Their web presence has been described as a "rich man's Craigslist".

In December 2021, duPont REGISTRY became part of the Motorsport Network. and now is part of duPont REGISTRY Group.
