= Autocourse =

Annuals of motor racing

The 50th anniversary edition of Autocourse, covering the 2000 season. Pictured on the cover is Michael Schumacher, the World Drivers' Champion that year.

Autocourse is a series of annuals covering motor racing, and Formula One in particular. The annuals cover a long period of the sport's history, from 1951 to the present day, and, as such, are highly collectable.

== Autocourse Bibliography ==
Vol I 1951/52 1 1951 2 1951 3 1951 4 1952

Vol II 1952/53 1 1952 2 1952 3 1952 4 1953

Vol III 1953/54 1 5/1953 2 7/1953 3 9/1953 4 11/1953 5 1/1954 6 3/1954

Vol IV 1954/55 1 5/1954 2 7-8/1954 3 9-10/1954 4 11-12/1954 5 2/1955 6 4/1955

Vol V 1955/56 1 6/1955 2 8/1955 3 10/1955 4 12/1955 5 2/1956 6 3/1956

Vol VI 1956/57 1 4/1956 2 5/1956 3 6/1956 4 7/1956 5 8/1956 6 9/1956 7 10/1956 8 11/1956 9 12/1956 10 1/1957 11 2/1957 12 3/1957

Vol VII 1957 13 4/1957 14 5/1957 15 6/1957 16 7/1957 17 8/1957 18 9/1957 19 10/1957 20 11/1957 21 12/1957

Vol VIII 1958 22 1/1958 23 2/1958 24 3/1958 25 4/1958 26 5/1958 27 6/1958 28 7/1958 29 8/1958 30 9/1958 31 10/1958 32 11/1958 33 12/1958

Vol IX 1959 34 1/1959 Autocourse & Sporting Motorist 35 2/1959 “ 36 3/1959 “ 37 4/1959 “ 38 5/1959 Sporting Motorist 39 6/1959 “ 40 7/1959 “ 41 8/1959 “ 42 9/1959 “ 43 10/1959 “ 44 11/1959 “ 45 12/1959 “

1959 Annual

1960 Annual in 2 parts

== History ==
The first edition of Autocourse appeared in 1951, as a quarterly review of motorsport, initially with each article in four languages (English, French, German and Italian). Its aims were "to provide the most complete data obtainable with interesting and authentic information, settle arguments and provide countless hours of interesting study and amusement." In 1957 a change of publisher saw the title change to 'Autocourse - For Motoring Sportsmen' and then as 'Autocourse and Sporting Motorist' until 1959. The first Autocourse in annual form was published in 1959 as a paperback. The first hardback annual was 1961/62 which continues to this day. In 1963, Jim Clark started the tradition of the F1 World Champion writing the foreword for the annual, a tradition only broken in 1991, when Senna refused following a dispute over the annual's Top Ten drivers (see below).

Starting in 1966, the annual's editor (currently Tony Dodgins, who took over in 2016 after the death of long time editor Alan Henry) has chosen the Top Ten F1 drivers of each season. In 1991, the Formula One Review was changed into a team-by-team format. In 2000, Autocourse celebrated its 50th anniversary. In 2005, Bryn Williams took on the publishing of the annual with Crash Media Group, who purchased the series from Hazleton Publishing (publishers since 1975).

In late 2009, CMG confirmed a deal to sell on the title to Icon Publishing (which was formed by Bryn Williams again with Steve Small who has a long established relationship with the annual from being the Picture Editor).

== Format ==
=== Title pages ===
The front cover features a full-scale photograph of that year's F1 championship-winning driver in his car, underneath the distinctive yellow "Autocourse" title. In 1976, a drawing by Michael Turner was also used. In 1994 and 1995, three photos were used on the front cover. The interior title page often features the runner-up, or another photograph of note.

=== Foreword ===
This has been written by the newly crowned champion since 1963 and is accompanied by their signature. There have been only two exceptions. The first was in 1991, when Nobuhiko Kawamoto, the chief of Honda's F1 engine programme, wrote it instead of Ayrton Senna, after Senna was not acclaimed the Number One driver in the annual the previous year, despite winning the title.

The second occasion was in 2023 when the foreword was penned by Red Bull Racing team principal Christian Horner.

=== Editor's introduction ===
This is a page or so of material which summarises the year in motor racing from the editor's point of view. For the 50th anniversary edition in 2000, the publisher, Richard Poulter, also wrote a brief introduction.

=== Top ten drivers ===
The annual states that these top ten F1 drivers are "chosen by the editor, taking into account their racing performances and the equipment at their disposal". This has been a feature of Autocourse since 1966. Drivers who do not complete the whole season are not usually eligible to be included in the list, although exceptions have been made.

==== List of number one drivers ====
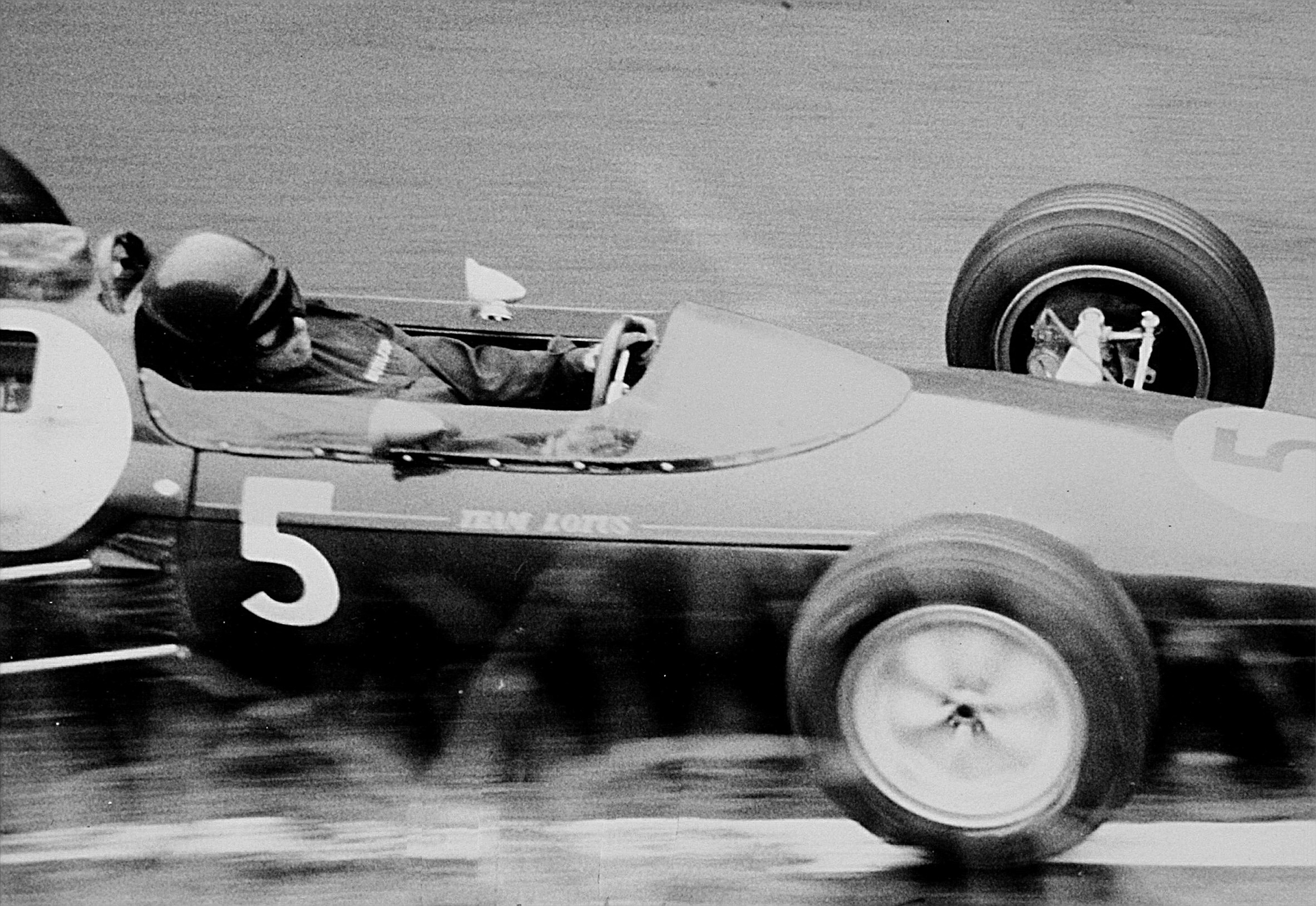
Jim Clark was the first Autocourse #1, in 1966

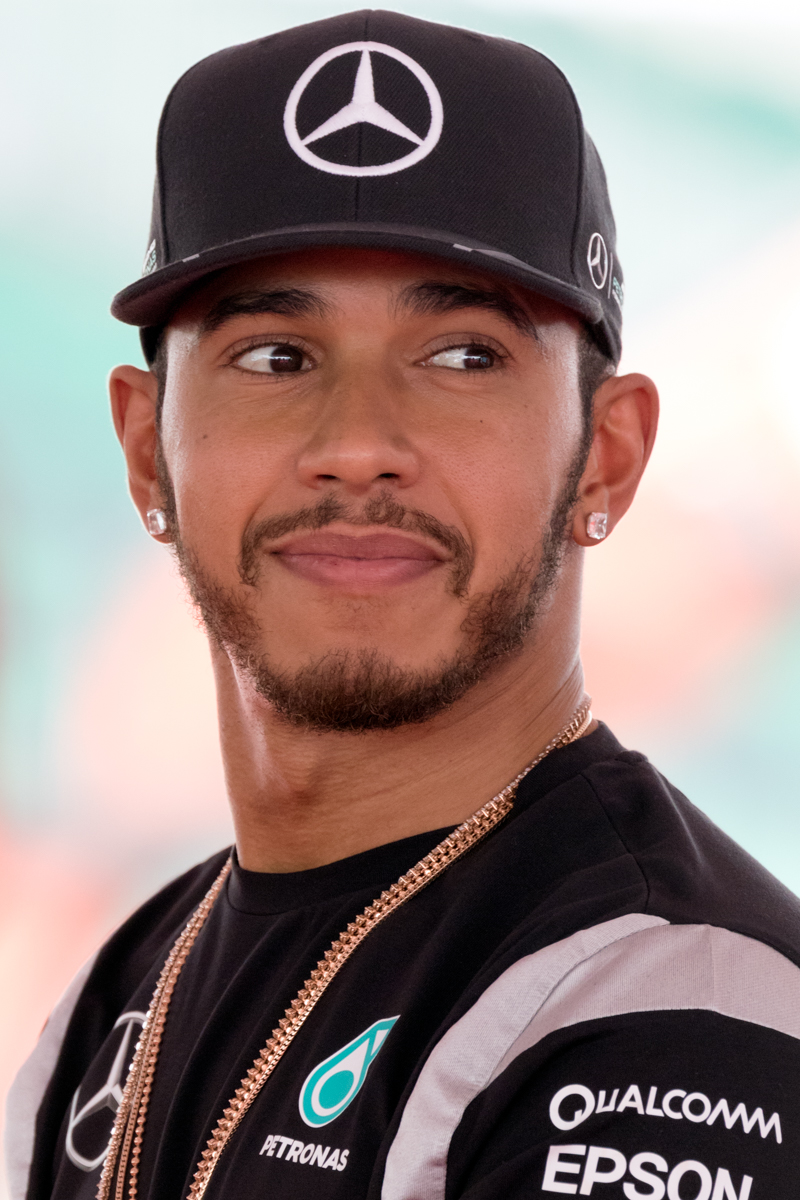
Lewis Hamilton is the most prolific Autocourse #1, having received the accolade on nine occasions

- 1966 – Jim Clark
- 1967 – Jim Clark (2)
- 1968 – Jackie Stewart
- 1969 – Jackie Stewart (2)
- 1970 – Jackie Stewart (3)
- 1971 – Jackie Stewart (4)
- 1972 – Jackie Stewart (5)
- 1973 – Jackie Stewart (6)
- 1974 – Emerson Fittipaldi
- 1975 – Niki Lauda
- 1976 – Niki Lauda (2)
- 1977 – Niki Lauda (3)
- 1978 – Niki Lauda (4)
- 1979 – Alan Jones
- 1980 – Alan Jones (2)
- 1981 – Alan Jones (3)
- 1982 – none (left blank as a mark of respect to Gilles Villeneuve and Didier Pironi)
- 1983 – Nelson Piquet
- 1984 – Alain Prost
- 1985 – Alain Prost (2)
- 1986 – Alain Prost (3)
- 1987 – Alain Prost (4)
- 1988 – Ayrton Senna
- 1989 – Nigel Mansell
- 1990 – Alain Prost (5)
- 1991 – Ayrton Senna (2)
- 1992 – Nigel Mansell (2)
- 1993 – Ayrton Senna (3)
- 1994 – Damon Hill
- 1995 – Michael Schumacher
- 1996 – Michael Schumacher (2)
- 1997 – Jacques Villeneuve
- 1998 – Michael Schumacher (3)
- 1999 – Heinz-Harald Frentzen
- 2000 – Michael Schumacher (4)
- 2001 – Michael Schumacher (5)
- 2002 – Michael Schumacher (6)
- 2003 – Michael Schumacher (7)
- 2004 – Michael Schumacher (8)
- 2005 – Fernando Alonso
- 2006 – Fernando Alonso (2)
- 2007 – Lewis Hamilton
- 2008 – Lewis Hamilton (2)
- 2009 – Jenson Button
- 2010 – Sebastian Vettel
- 2011 – Sebastian Vettel (2)
- 2012 – Fernando Alonso (3)
- 2013 – Sebastian Vettel (3)
- 2014 – Lewis Hamilton (3)
- 2015 – Lewis Hamilton (4)
- 2016 – Lewis Hamilton (5)
- 2017 – Lewis Hamilton (6)
- 2018 – Lewis Hamilton (7)
- 2019 – Lewis Hamilton (8)
- 2020 - Lewis Hamilton (9)
- 2021 - Max Verstappen
- 2022 - Max Verstappen (2)
- 2023 - Max Verstappen (3)
- 2024 - Max Verstappen (4)
- 2025 - Max Verstappen (5)

=== Obituaries ===
Obituaries of persons involved in motorsport who have died during the past year. The 2008 edition included obituaries for Phil Hill, Ove Andersson, Paul Newman and Jean-Marie Balestre, among a few others. As Autocourse is published before the end of the year, persons who died at the end of the year are listed in next publication, for example the obituary of Clay Regazzoni was in the 2007 edition.

=== Formula One features ===
There are usually some in-depth articles on various F1 topics; e.g., rule changes. These are usually written by well-known motor racing journalists, for example Nigel Roebuck.

=== Formula One review ===
This is the main section of the annual. Before 1991, this consisted of an in-depth analysis of the season as a whole, followed by technical reviews of each team and chassis specifications.

==== Team-by-Team ====
From 1991 onwards, the Formula One review was organised in a team-by-team format, with the analysis, specifications, an illustration of each car and photos of the relevant drivers (and team personnel) in a single team's section.

==== Grands Prix ====
This is the longest section of the annual, and contains a report on each Grand Prix in the Formula One season, including qualifying, photos, comprehensive results and sidebars for more in-depth news stories.

==== Points and percentages ====
This consists of the full results table for the season, featuring each driver and accompanied since 1996 by a group photo of all the drivers in one of the Grands Prix. Other statistics are also given, such as overall career details for each driver and their average qualifying position over the season.

=== Other categories ===
Every year, a review of junior single seater formulae is included (currently F2, F3 and Formula Three), as well as reports on the year's international sports car racing, and the American racing scene (comprising NASCAR, IndyCar Series and IMSA SportsCar Championship). The current annuals are over 300 pages long.

== Sister publications ==
Aside from one-off driver and team biographies branded as Autocourse publications, there are also five other annuals:

- Rallycourse (1982-2008), which covers rallying.
- Motocourse (since 1976), which covers motorcycle road racing.
- Autocourse Indycar / CART / Champ Car Yearbook (1993-2005), which covers American open-wheel car racing.
- Autocourse Indianapolis 500 & Indy Racing League Official Yearbook (2003-2004).
- Autocourse British Motorsport Year (1995-1997) which covers the British Touring Car Championship and other major British motor racing series.

== Bibliography ==
- Autocourse 1975–1976, Kettlewell, Mike (ed.), Hazleton Securities Ltd (1975) ISBN 0-905138-00-7
- Autocourse 1976–1977, Kettlewell, Mike (ed.), Hazleton Securities Ltd (1976) ISBN 0-905138-01-5
- Autocourse 1977–1978, Kettlewell, Mike (ed.), Hazleton Securities Ltd (1977) ISBN 0-905138-03-1
- Autocourse 1978–1979, Kettlewell, Mike (ed.), Hazleton Securities Ltd (1978) ISBN 0-905138-05-8
- Autocourse 1979–1980, Hamilton, Maurice (ed.), Hazleton Securities Ltd (1979) ISBN 0-905138-08-2
- Autocourse 1980–1981, Hamilton, Maurice (ed.), Hazleton Publishing Ltd (1980) ISBN 0-905138-12-0
- Autocourse 1981–1982, Hamilton, Maurice (ed.), Hazleton Publishing Ltd (1981) ISBN 0-905138-17-1
- Autocourse 1982–1983, Hamilton, Maurice (ed.), Hazleton Publishing Ltd (1982) ISBN 0-905138-21-X
- Autocourse 1983–1984, Hamilton, Maurice (ed.), Hazleton Publishing Ltd (1983) ISBN 0-905138-25-2
- Autocourse 1984–1985, Hamilton, Maurice (ed.), Hazleton Publishing Ltd (1984) ISBN 0-905138-32-5
- Autocourse 1985–1986, Hamilton, Maurice (ed.), Hazleton Publishing Ltd (1985) ISBN 0-905138-38-4
- Autocourse 1986–1987, Hamilton, Maurice (ed.), Hazleton Publishing Ltd (1986) ISBN 0-905138-44-9
- Autocourse 1987–1988, Hamilton, Maurice (ed.), Hazleton Publishing Ltd (1987) ISBN 0-905138-47-3
- Autocourse 1988–1989, Henry, Alan (ed.), Hazleton Publishing Ltd (1988) ISBN 0-905138-57-0
- Autocourse 1989–1990, Henry, Alan (ed.), Hazleton Publishing Ltd (1989) ISBN 0-905138-62-7
- Autocourse 1990–1991, Henry, Alan (ed.), Hazleton Publishing Ltd (1990) ISBN 0-905138-74-0
- Autocourse 1991–1992, Henry, Alan (ed.), Hazleton Publishing Ltd (1991) ISBN 0-905138-87-2
- Autocourse 1992–1993, Henry, Alan (ed.), Hazleton Publishing Ltd (1992) ISBN 0-905138-96-1
- Autocourse 1993–1994, Henry, Alan (ed.), Hazleton Publishing Ltd (1993) ISBN 1-874557-15-2
- Autocourse 1994–1995, Henry, Alan (ed.), Hazleton Publishing Ltd (1994) ISBN 1-874557-95-0
- Autocourse 1995–1996, Henry, Alan (ed.), Hazleton Publishing Ltd (1995) ISBN 978-1-874557-36-4
- Autocourse 1996–1997, Henry, Alan (ed.), Hazleton Publishing Ltd (1996) ISBN 978-1-874557-91-3
- Autocourse 1997–1998, Henry, Alan (ed.), Hazleton Publishing Ltd (1997) ISBN 978-1-874557-47-0
- Autocourse 1998–1999, Henry, Alan (ed.), Hazleton Publishing Ltd (1998) ISBN 978-1-874557-43-2
- Autocourse 1999–2000, Henry, Alan (ed.), Hazleton Publishing Ltd (1999) ISBN 978-1-874557-34-0
- Autocourse 2000–2001, Henry, Alan (ed.), Hazleton Publishing Ltd (2000) ISBN 978-1-874557-79-1
- Autocourse 2001–2002, Henry, Alan (ed.), Hazleton Publishing Ltd (2001) ISBN 978-1-903135-06-8
- Autocourse 2002–2003, Henry, Alan (ed.), Hazleton Publishing Ltd (2002) ISBN 978-1-903135-10-5
- Autocourse 2003–2004, Henry, Alan (ed.), Hazleton Publishing Ltd (2003) ISBN 978-1-903135-20-4
- Autocourse 2004–2005, Henry, Alan (ed.), Hazleton Publishing Ltd (2004) ISBN 978-1-903135-35-8
- Autocourse 2005–2006, Henry, Alan (ed.), Crash Media Group Ltd (2005) ISBN 1-905334-04-4
- Autocourse 2006–2007, Henry, Alan (ed.), Crash Media Group Ltd (2006) ISBN 1-905334-15-X
- Autocourse 2007–2008, Henry, Alan (ed.), Crash Media Group Ltd (2007) ISBN 1-905334-21-4
- Autocourse 2008–2009, Henry, Alan (ed.), Crash Media Group Ltd (2008) ISBN 978-1-905334-31-5
- Autocourse 2009–2010, Henry, Alan (ed.), Icon Publishing Ltd (2009) ISBN 978-1-905334-52-0
- Autocourse 2010–2011, Henry, Alan (ed.), Icon Publishing Ltd (2010) ISBN 978-1-905334-57-5
- Autocourse 2011–2012, Henry, Alan (ed.), Icon Publishing Ltd (2011) ISBN 978-1-905334-61-2
- Autocourse 2012–2013, Henry, Alan (ed.), Icon Publishing Ltd (2012) ISBN 978-1-905334-77-3
- Autocourse 2013–2014, Henry, Alan (ed.), Icon Publishing Ltd (2013) ISBN 978-1-905334-84-1
- Autocourse 2014–2015, Henry, Alan (ed.), Icon Publishing Ltd (2014) ISBN 978-1-905334-97-1
- Autocourse 2015–2016, Dodgins, Tony (ed.), Icon Publishing Ltd (2015) ISBN 978-1-910584-08-8
- Autocourse 2016–2017, Dodgins, Tony (ed.), Icon Publishing Ltd (2016) ISBN 978-1-910584-22-4
- Autocourse 2017–2018, Dodgins, Tony (ed.), Icon Publishing Ltd (2017) ISBN 978-1-910584-26-2
- Autocourse 2018–2019, Dodgins, Tony (ed.), Icon Publishing Ltd (2018) ISBN 978-1-910584-31-6
- Autocourse 2019–2020, Dodgins, Tony (ed.), Icon Publishing Ltd (2019) ISBN 978-1-910584-40-8
- Autocourse 2020–2021, Dodgins, Tony (ed.), Icon Publishing Ltd (2020) ISBN 978-1-910584-42-2
- Autocourse 2021–2022, Dodgins, Tony (ed.), Icon Publishing Ltd (2021) ISBN 978-1-910584-46-0
- Autocourse 2022–2023, Dodgins, Tony (ed.), Icon Publishing Ltd (2022) ISBN 978-1-910584-50-7
- Autocourse 2023–2024, Dodgins, Tony (ed.), Icon Publishing Ltd (2023) ISBN 978-1-910584-54-5
- Autocourse 2024–2025, Dodgins, Tony (ed.), Icon Publishing Ltd (2024) ISBN 978-1-910584-58-3
- Autocourse 2025–2026, Dodgins, Tony (ed.), Icon Publishing Ltd (2025) ISBN 978-1-910584-63-7
