= Autosport =

British motorsport magazine

- Editor: Haydn Cobb (online); Kevin Turner (print)
- Categories: Sports
- Frequency: Monthly
- Total circulation: 18,022 (Jan-Dec 2016)
- First issue: 1950; 76 years ago
- Company: Motorsport Network
- Country: United Kingdom
- Based in: London
- Language: English
- Website: www.autosport.com
- ISSN: 0269-946X

Autosport is a global motorsport publishing brand headquartered based in Richmond, London, England. It was established in 1950 at the same time as the origins of the Formula One World Championship.

Autosport began life as a weekly magazine in 1950 and expanded into digital publishing with the creation of Autosport.com in 1997. In 2016, Haymarket Media Group sold Autosport and the rest of its motorsport portfolio to Motorsport Network.

== Autosport.com ==
Autosport launched its website – Autosport.com – in 1997. As distinct from the magazine, the online content is more internationally focused, as well as covering sports news and reporting on races, Autosport.com also produces video and galleries taken from the Motorsport Images archive and in-depth long-form content in the website's subscriber-only sections.

=== Autosport Plus ===
Autosport Plus is a paywalled part of the autosport.com website with additional content.

=== Current editorial team ===
- Editor - Haydn Cobb
- Plus Editor - James Newbold
- Grand Prix Editor - Alex Kalinauckas
- F1 Reporter - Luke Smith
- F1 Editor - Matt Kew
- International Editor - Lewis Duncan
- News Editor - Megan White
- News Editor - Tom Howard
- Technical Editor - Jake Boxall-Legge
- Director of Digital - Jessica McFadyen
- Technical Team Leader - Geoff Creighton

== Autosport Magazine ==
Autosport first issue was published in 1950 and the weekly newsstand title has been in continuous publication ever since.

It covers all forms of motorsport from Formula 1 through to the British club racing scene. The magazine carries race and rally reports from high-profile and significant meetings from all over the world and the UK and blends this with news analysis and in-depth articles looking at contemporary cars, drivers and events as well as retrospective looks at significant characters and developments from the sport's past.

Traditionally Autosport had only focused on four-wheel racing, but its editorial expanded to include MotoGP coverage in 2014. In the past, the magazine once carried reviews of new road cars, but it is now specifically dedicated to racing and rallying.

Autosport stopped printing their magazine on 30 April 2020 due to COVID, and said that they would resume in time for the 2020 Formula 1 season. They then resumed publishing with the issue dated 3 July 2020.

Autosport switched from a weekly to a monthly publication at the beginning of 2025, after it was merged with its sister title GP Racing.

=== Current editorial team ===
Since May 2016 the magazine has been edited by Kevin Turner, who was previously the editor of sister title Motorsport News. The other full-time members of staff are.

- Chief Editor - Kevin Turner
- Deputy editor - Marcus Simmons
- Grand Prix editor - Alex Kalinauckas
- F1 Editor - Matt Kew
- F1 Reporter - Luke Smith
- Technical Editor - Jake Boxall-Legge
- Production Editor - Peter Hodges
- Group National Editor - Stephen Lickorish
- Performance and Engineering Editor - James Newbold
- Deputy National Editor - Stefan Mackley
- Art Director - Lynsey Elliott
- Art Editor - Michael Cavalli

In addition, the magazine features a number of freelance correspondents. Among these are F1 columnist Nigel Roebuck, Sportscar specialist Gary Watkins and British Club racing expert Marcus Pye. It also has correspondents covering club-level racing from the British domestic racing scene and prominent international races and rallies.

=== Editions ===
Autosport Asia Edition

In April 2011, Autosport re-launched Autosport Asia Edition. It is published by Bespoke Media Pte Ltd in Singapore. It is a monthly magazine instead of a weekly and the aim is that it will carry over most of the month's content from the British edition, as well as placing a very strong emphasis on the Asian motorsport scene.

Autosport Russian Edition

On 11 February 2013, launched Autosport Russian Edition.

Autosport Arabic Edition

On 1 November 2013, launched Autosport Arabic Edition.

Autosport French Edition

On 3 April 2014, launched Autosport French Edition.

== Autosport Engineering & Autosport Performance ==
Autosport Engineering and Autosport Performance are regular supplements that appear in Autosport each month on a rotating basis. Edited by James Newbold, Autosport Engineering is derived from the section of the Autosport International Show of the same name.

The supplement has a particular focus on companies based in the UK.

== Autosport International ==
Autosport International is a motorsport-themed exhibition, which has taken place every January at the NEC Birmingham, UK, since 1991.

== Autosport Awards ==
The Autosport Awards, held annually at The Grosvenor House Hotel on Park Lane in London on the first weekend in December is motorsport's red carpet event, honouring the achievements of the race drivers from Formula One and other world championships, as well as recognising and promoting emerging talent.

== Former Autosport Editors ==
Name	Start	End
Gregor Grant	August 1950	March 1968
Simon Taylor	April 1968	August 1971
Richard Feast	August 1971	November 1973
Ian Phillips	November 1973	April 1976
Quentin Spurring	May 1976	November 1981
Mark Hughes	November 1981	November 1983
Quentin Spurring	November 1983	March 1988
Peter Foubister	April 1988	January 1992
Andy Hallbery	February 1992	April 1993
Bruce Jones	April 1993	June 1996
Laurence Foster	June 1996	February 1998
Mark Skewis	February 1998	March 2000
Anthony Rowlinson	March 2000	February 2002
Laurence Foster	February 2002	January 2004
John McIlroy	January 2004	October 2005
Andrew van de Burgt	November 2005	July 2011
Charles Bradley	July 2011	November 2014
Edd Straw	December 2014	May 2016
Kevin Turner	May 2016	
