= Alan Henry =

British Grand Prix reporter and book author (1947–2016)

Alan Henry (9 June 1947 – 3 March 2016) was a British Grand Prix reporter and book author.

== Career ==
Henry had been a Grand Prix reporter since the early 1970s, and he was the Formula One correspondent of The Guardian. Until the end of 2012, he was Grand Prix editor of Autocar magazine; he was the Editor at Large of F1 Racing magazine. Henry was also the chief editor of the yearly Autocourse Formula One season review books, a position he had held since 1988, and he wrote a weekly blog for the McLaren team's website. Additionally, Henry authored more than 50 motorsport-related books and won the 1984 Pierre Dreyfus award from the Guild of Motoring Writers for his book Ferrari: The Grand Prix Cars (1985).

== Personal life ==
Henry lived in rural Essex with his wife and family. He died on 3 March 2016 after an illness.

== Publications ==
Partial list

- Henry, Alan (2009). Jenson Button: A World Champion's Story. J H Haynes & Co Ltd. ISBN 978-1-84425-936-6.
- — (1988). Derek Bell: My Racing Life. Patrick Stephens Ltd 1988. ISBN 978-1-85260-107-2.
- — (1985). Brabham: The Grand Prix Cars. Hazleton Publishing 1985. ISBN 0-905138-36-8.
- — (1981). Flat-12: The racing career of Ferrari's 3-litre Grand Prix and Sports cars. Motor Racing Publications Ltd. ISBN 0-900549-62-9.
- — (1975). Ronnie Peterson, SuperSwede, Grand Prix Racing Driver: Story of a Search for Perfection. G T Foulis & Co Ltd. ISBN 978-0-85429-175-5.
- — (1990). Jochen Rindt Autocourse Driver Profile 8. Hazelton Publishing. ISBN 0905138791.
- — (1988). Fifty Famous Motor Races Highlights from half a century of the world's most exciting sport. Patrick Stephens Limited. ISBN 0-85059-937-7.
- — (1994). Remembering Ayrton Senna. Motorbooks International and George Weidenfield LTD. ISBN 0-87938-971-0.
- — (1996). Wheel To Wheel The Great Duels of Formula One. George Weidenfeld & Nicolson Orion Publishing Group and Motorbooks International. ISBN 0-7603-0269-3.
- — (1989). Niki Lauda Autocourse Driver Profile 2. Hazleton Publishing 1989. ISBN 0-905138-68-6.
- — (1991). Ayrton Senna Autocourse Driver Profile 9. Hazleton Publishing 1991. ISBN 0-905138-92-9.
- — (1986). Niki Lauda Kimberley's Racing Driver Profile No. 4. Kimberley's 1986. ISBN 0-946132-35-6.
- — (1997). Grand Prix Circuits A guided tour of the Formula One Circuits from starting grid to chequered flag. George Weidenfeld & Nicolson LTD and Motorbooks International. ISBN 0297822646.
