= NASCAR Heat 4 =

2019 racing video game

- Cover art featuring Kevin Harvick and Tony Stewart
- Developer: Monster Games
- Publisher: 704Games
- Series: NASCAR Heat
- Platforms: Microsoft Windows; PlayStation 4 Xbox One
- Release: September 13, 2019
- Genre: Racing
- Modes: Single-player, multiplayer

NASCAR Heat 4 is a racing video game simulating the 2019 NASCAR season. It was developed by Monster Games and was published by 704Games on September 13, 2019, for PlayStation 4, Xbox One and Microsoft Windows via Steam. Kevin Harvick is the cover athlete (for the first time since NASCAR 2005: Chase for the Cup) for the regular release of the game along with Tony Stewart, and Jeff Gordon is on the cover of the Gold Edition. The game was delisted from digital storefronts on December 31, 2024, and online servers were shut down on August 1, 2025.

== Gameplay ==
The Xtreme Dirt Tour returned to the game, and Tony Stewart is a driver and team owner in the series. Players in career mode for the first time can start in any of the four series (NASCAR Cup, Xfinity, Trucks, and Xtreme Dirt). Additional updates to the game included different tire compounds for different track types and a track map. Also, custom cars now have an open number choice from 0-99 (including 00–09) for both quick race and career mode.

== Downloadable content ==
Paid downloadable content packages are available. The downloadable content for pre-ordering is the ability to race Martinsville Speedway at night. Although later on in 2019, the Martinsville night race would be a playable option in the game without the need for a download.

== Reception ==
Reception

Aggregate score
Aggregator	Score
Metacritic	(PS4) 70/100 (XONE) 74/100

Review scores
Publication	Score
Game Informer	7.25/10
Hardcore Gamer	4.5/5

NASCAR Heat 4 received "mixed or average" reviews according to review aggregator Metacritic.

Matthew Kato of Game Informer called this iteration of NASCAR Heat the strongest, noting that its flaws made it more admirable than excellent. The online mode and AI were also criticized for being subpar and the career mode was deemed adequate.

=== Accolades ===
The game was nominated for "Game, Franchise Racing" at the NAVGTR Awards.
