= Haymarket Media Group =

Privately held English media company

- Formerly: Cornmarket Press
- Type: Private
- Industry: Mass media
- Founded: 1957; 69 years ago
- Founders: Michael Heseltine; Clive Labovitch
- Headquarters: Twickenham, London, England
- Website: haymarket.com

Haymarket Media Group is a private media company headquartered in London, United Kingdom. It has publications in the consumer, business and customer sectors, both print and online. It operates exhibitions allied to its own publications, and previously on behalf of organisations such as the BBC.

== History ==
Haymarket was founded in 1957. Clive Labovitch and Michael Heseltine – later a Cabinet minister under Margaret Thatcher and Deputy Prime Minister under John Major – who had met at university, started out with the 1957 Directory of Opportunities for Graduates, and in 1959 relaunched Man About Town, which was to become an influential (if unprofitable) men's consumer magazine.

The company failed in its relaunch of the British news weekly Topic, the title closing at the end of 1962, within three months of the takeover. The partners split in 1965, with Heseltine renaming his half of the business Haymarket Press to publish Management Today. In 1965, the company acquired the medical business AE Morgan, which produced a reference book of drug formulas for the medical profession, for £250,000.

In 1967 British Printing Corporation merged its titles into the company too. New titles included weekly Autosport, monthly Lithoprinter (later known as PrintWeek) and Gardener's Chronicle (GC).

The company was renamed Haymarket Publishing; owing to its growing presence in online media and live events, it was rebranded as Haymarket Media Group in 2007. Haymarket has laboured under heavy borrowings since Michael Heseltine returned from politics to take the helm and to buy back large minority shareholdings from Lindsay Masters and Simon Tindall, who had managed the business in his absence. These borrowings were reduced to some extent by the sale of properties. The company is now managed by Heseltine's son Rupert.

== Operations ==
=== Haymarket Business Media ===
This division provides news and information for professionals in areas including environmental management, horticulture, planning, medicine and marketing. These are generally subscription-only publications and, in all but a limited number of cases, are not available for sale via retail.

The portfolio includes a number of magazines and websites: Brand Republic, Campaign, Clinical Advisor, COMPASS Online, Conference and Incentive Travel, DCP Online, DMNews, The ENDS Report, Event, FinanceAsia, GP magazine, Horticulture Week, Monthly Prescribing Reference, Management Today, Marketing, Marketing Direct, McKnight's Long-Term Care News, Media Week, MIMS, MM&M, Planning Resource, PRWeek, Placemaking Resource, Renal & Urology News, SC Magazine, Third Sector, TASPO, Cancer Therapy Advisor and Windpower Monthly.

=== Haymarket Consumer Media ===
Haymarket publishes a number of automotive consumer magazines, all for sale by retail, and also a number of websites. The portfolio includes Autocar, CAT, Classic & Sports Car, and What Car?. The division was formerly a home to motoring photographic agency LAT Photographic.

In 2013, Haymarket sold Gramophone to Mark Allen Group. In 2016, Haymarket sold its motorsport properties (including LAT Photographic) to Motorsport Network. In 2018, Haymarket sold Practical Caravan, Practical Motorhome, FourFourTwo and What Hi-Fi? to Future and Stuff to Kelsey Media.

=== Wonderly ===
In February 2019, the Haymarket Media Group launched Wonderly, a content marketing agency. In April 2019, Nic Shaw joined Wonderly to lead an editorial team embedded in Volkswagen Group's headquarters in Milton Keynes.

=== Haymarket exhibitions ===
Exhibitions include:

- Autosport International (sold to Motorsport Network)
- Clothes Show Live (sold to SME London Ltd)

=== Worldwide ===
Haymarket entered the Indian market in 1999, becoming one of the first foreign-owned magazine publishers to do so.
