= Motorsport Network =

American media and technology company

- Type: Private
- Industry: Technology
- Founded: 2015; 11 years ago Miami, Florida, U.S.
- Headquarters: New York, New York, USA
- Area served: Motorsport and automotive
- Brands: Motorsport.com; Autosport.com; Motorsport.tv; Motor1.com; Motorsport Games; MotorsportImages.com; InsideEVs.com; FerrariChat.com; MYEV.com; Motorsportjobs.com; Motorsportstats.com; Motorsporttickets.com; Canossa.com; RideApart.com
- Number of employees: 600 (2019)
- Website: motorsportnetwork.com

Motorsport Network is an American media and technology company headquartered in Miami, Florida and London, UK. The company's proprietary brands, websites and OTT operations focus on motor racing and consumer automotive content serving and presenting content to audiences worldwide. The privately held business was founded in 2015 with the acquisition of Motorsport.com and now operates international digital, videogame, print, e-commerce & event businesses.

== History ==
Following the acquisition of Motorsport.com, the company established its headquarters in Miami in 2015.

In 2016, it acquired its major competitor, the Haymarket Publishing portfolio of motor racing brands. This including the magazine Autosport, which was established in 1950.

The company opened an automotive division with the creation of the Motor1.com brand that subsequently has been supplemented by the creation or acquisition of a number of other motoring platforms including FerrariChat.com, InsideEVs.com, and MYEV.com.

In May 2017, Motorsport Network conducted a multi-lingual Global Fan Survey of Formula One, reputed to be the world's largest fan survey of any sport, with over 200,000 respondents.

In 2018, James Allen, formerly the Financial Times' Formula 1 correspondent and network commentator with UK broadcasters ITV and BBC was appointed as the company's president.

In May 2018, Motorsport Network bolstered its presence in the esports market through partnerships with Codemasters, Le Mans and NASCAR.

In 2019, the company attracted two new investors. Formula 1 multiple world champion Fernando Alonso became a shareholder in the esport division and Formula E's founder, Alejandro Agag, became a shareholder in the organization’s electric vehicle (EV) operation.

In February 2020, Mehul Kapadia, formerly SVP Global Head of Marketing at Tata Communications, joined the company as COO.

In April 2020, the company also announced a partnership with Ferrari for an official channel on the Motorsport.tv streaming platform. This was followed by an official Mercedes Benz Motorsport channel in August 2020.

In May 2021, the company announced that it had agreed to acquire the luxury automotive marketplace duPont Registry as the centerpiece of a new division focused on the buying and selling of supercars and luxury automobiles.

In October 2021, the company announced the promotion of Oliver Ciesla to the role of CEO.

In June 2023, Motorsport Network Media was acquired by GMF Capital. The deal included 50+ websites, but not the company's gaming division.

== Motorsport Network businesses ==
Motorsport Network businesses are divided into two categories of Motorsport and Automotive.

=== Motorsport Business ===
==== Motorsport.com ====
Motorsport.com is Motorsport Network's flagship website, which operates in 15 languages and 21 national editions.

The platform reports on all forms of international and national motorsport, including Formula 1, MotoGP, NASCAR, and IndyCar, on a rolling 24/7 basis. It’s powered by a multi-edition CMS that aggregates and localizes news, video, photos and results. Founded in 1994, the platform has been the cornerstone of Motorsport Network and was acquired by the business in 2012.

==== Motorsport.tv ====
In 2016, Motorsport.com acquired the French pan-European TV-station Motors TV after it went bankrupt, renaming it Motorsport TV. In 2018, the linear television station was shut down, shifting programming to a renamed Motorsport.tv as a digital streaming service (OTT). Motorsport.tv, headquartered in Miami, Florida, includes live motorsport events, news, documentaries, long-format content, historical/archive programming, and studio shows.

==== Motorsport Images ====
Motorsport Images is a racing and automotive photo and technical drawing archives with over 26 million assets under management. The operation is made up of a portfolio of motorsport and automotive photo agencies, including the assignment photo agency LAT Images. LAT Images has contributed 14 million racing and automotive photos that date back to 1895 and has a large trackside presence of staff photographers at international motor racing events. The group's assets also contain the archives of Sutton Images and the associated Phipps archive, the Rainer Schlegelmilch archive, and the collection of race car technical drawings illustrated by Giorgio Piola.

==== Motorsport Tickets ====
Motorsport Tickets is a dedicated global motorsport experiences provider, providing official tickets for Formula One, MotoGP, World Endurance Championship, World Rally Championship and NASCAR. Motorsport Network entered the ticketing market with the acquisition of BookF1.com, before further acquiring the Dutch business SportStadion. BookF1 became Motorsport Live in 2019, before a further rebranding to Motorsport Tickets. In 2020, it was announced that Motorsport Tickets had acquired the accommodation supplier Travel Destinations.

==== Autosport ====
Founded in 1950, Autosport is a magazine that has been in continuous weekly publication since 25 August 1950, covering all aspects of international motorsport. It has covered Formula One since the championship's inception. The magazine's website, Autosport.com, headquartered in Richmond, London, is an English language website covering international motorsport. Autosport.com formed part of Motorsport Network's acquisition of Haymarket Media Group's motorsport businesses in November 2016.

The magazine presents the Autosport Awards, a series of awards presented to drivers that have achieved significant milestones each season. Some of the presentations are selected by the general public via a reader's poll. The awards have been presented every year since 1982.

==== Autosport International ====
Autosport International is a motorsport-themed exhibition, which has taken place every January at the NEC in Birmingham, UK, since 1991.

==== GP Racing ====
The GP Racing brand (originally known as F1 Racing) has been built from a foundation of its premium monthly print title. Established in 1996, as of 2018 it was published in 10 languages and 14 editions.

==== Motorsport Business ====
In March 2023, Motorsport Network launched a dedicated business-to-business service, Motorsports Business, with coverage of the business side of the motor sport industry with newsletters, social media channels, and a section on its main Motorsport.com website.

=== Automotive businesses ===
==== Motor1.com ====
Motor1.com is Motorsport Network's flagship platform for its portfolio of automotive businesses. In July 2015, Motorsport.com expanded its global portfolio into the consumer automotive review sector with the launch of Motor1.com.

As part of a growth strategy to deliver content in multiple languages, the platform quickly began rolling out localized regional editions. In June 2016, the company expanded its North American footprint with the launch of Motor1-Canada, appointing journalist Dave Pankew to lead the editorial team. It was the company's third regional property, joining the U.S. and Italy. The following month, Motor1.com announced its expansion with the debut of Motor1.com France.

Operating in 10 languages with multiple local editions, Motor1.com delivers over 100 video-led car reviews every month produced by house journalists, alongside vehicle buying guides, car news and localized car shopping by market. Motor1.com currently has editions in the US, France, Spain, Germany, Italy, Hungary, Turkey, Brazil, Argentina and Indonesia.

Motor1.com is headquartered in Motorsport Network's offices in New York.

==== InsideEVs ====
InsideEVs is the largest independent electric vehicle content website in the US and was acquired by Motorsport Network in February 2017.

InsideEVs also has editions in Germany, Italy, Turkey, Brazil and Argentina.

The website provides expert news and information from the rapidly expanding electric vehicle sector for consumer audiences.

==== FerrariChat.com ====
FerrariChat.com is an online Ferrari community founded in 2000. The community site has over 165,000 registered owners, or Ferrari owners and enthusiasts who have contributed over 11m posts to the site.

FerrariChat incorporates an auction platform to enable Ferrari sales within a dedicated community environment, as well as providing classified listings, all of which operate across desktop and responsive mobile versions.

==== Canossa Events ====
Canossa Events is company that organizes events for luxury and classic cars. It was founded in 2011 with a team of four, but expanded to 130 employees in eight years. Canossa merged into Motorsport Network in May 2019.

==== duPont Registry ====
Established in 1985, duPont Registry is the pioneer of the luxury and exotic automotive marketplace, dedicated to connecting affluent buyers with high-end exotic cars and luxury brands. In March 2022, duPont Registry announced that it had completed a Series A fundraising with investment from US entrepreneur and philanthropist Barry L. Skolnick and from Victor M. Gómez, III, the founder of Gómez Hermanos Kennedy, LLC, one of the largest luxury car dealer networks in the Americas.

=== Other Motorsport Network businesses and holdings ===
==== Motorsport Stats ====
Repository of motor racing results, data, and analytics

==== Giorgio Piola ====
Technical motorsport drawings

==== Motorsport Jobs ====
Platform for motorsport industry recruitment

==== Motormarket ====
Motorsport industry marketplace

== Major acquisitions, launches and disposals ==
- 1 May 2019 Acquisition of Canossa Events (IT)
- 10 May 2018 Acquisition of BookF1.com ticketing and travel agency (GB)
- 11 Jan 2018 The launch of MotorMarket.com (GB)
- 22 Aug 2017 The launch of Motorsportjobs.com (US)
- 09 Aug 2017 Acquisition of Schlegelmilch Archive (DE)
- 24 Jul 2017 Motor1.com launches in Hungary through acquisition (HU)
- 12 May 2017 Motor1.com launches in Australia through acquisition (AU)
- 07 Apr 2017 Motorsport Network acquires Sutton Images (UK)
- 16 Mar 2017 Motor1.com launches in the UK (UK)
- 28 Feb 2017 Motor1.com launches in Spain (ES)
- 08 Feb 2017 Motor1.com acquires InsideEVs.com (US)
- 07 Jan 2017 Motorsport Network acquires an interest in Formula E (UK)
- 06 Oct 2016 Motorsport Network acquires Haymarket Media Group's motor racing portfolio (UK)
