= Sons of Hollywood =

American reality show

- Country of origin: United States
- No. of seasons: 1
- No. of episodes: 13

Original release
- Network: A&E Network
- Release: April 1 – April 29, 2007

Sons of Hollywood is an American reality show starring Randy Spelling (son of Aaron Spelling), Sean Stewart (son of British rocker Rod Stewart), and agent David Weintraub.

== Overview ==
The show follows Randy Spelling, Sean Stewart, and their agent David Weintraub. In the show, Spelling and Stewart live together.

== Episodes ==
Episode #	Episode Title
1	"Lost Vega$"
2	"Spelling F-A-M-I-L-Y"
3	"Miami Place"
4	"'Night, Father"
5	"Making of a Male Actor"
6	"Harmed"
7	"Hi...Jack"
8	"The Odd Squad"
9	"Moms of Hollywood"
10	"S.W.A.T. (Spelling, Weintraub and Trouble)"
11	"Hollywood Hills 90069"
12	"And The Sons Played On"
13	"Rock And Roll"
