= Tamara Ecclestone =

English model, socialite and television personality (born 1984)

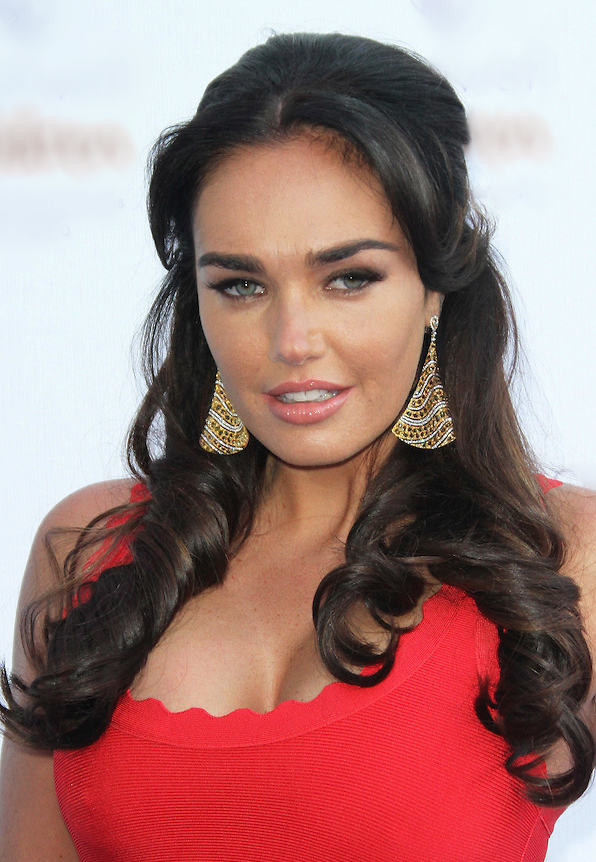
- Ecclestone in 2013
- Born: 28 June 1984 (age 42); Milan, Italy
- Citizenship: United Kingdom; Croatia
- Occupations: Model; socialite; television personality
- Years active: 2006–present
- Employer: Formula One Group
- Spouse: Jay Rutland (m. 2013)
- Children: 2
- Parents: Bernie Ecclestone; Slavica Radić
- Relatives: Petra Ecclestone (sister)
- Website: tamaraecclestone.com

Tamara Ecclestone Rutland (née Ecclestone; born 28 June 1984) is an English model, socialite, television personality, and the daughter of Bernie Ecclestone, the former chief executive of the Formula One Group, and Slavica Radić.

== Early life ==
Ecclestone was born in Milan, Italy, the daughter of former Armani model Slavica Radić born in Croatia in a Serbian family and English Formula One billionaire Bernie Ecclestone. She has a younger sister, Petra Ecclestone. She was educated at Francis Holland School in London and Benenden School in Kent. She speaks English, Croatian, and Italian.

== Career ==
Ecclestone was the presenter of Sky Sports Italia's coverage of the 2009 Formula 1 season. She has also been involved in a range of other lifestyle and glamour productions after making her television debut in 2006, presenting the Red Bull Air Race World Championship for Channel 4.

In 2011, she starred in her own reality television show Tamara Ecclestone: Billion $$$ Girl on Channel 5. Ecclestone posed nude for Playboy in May 2013. Tamara's World premiered in October 2017 on ITVBe.

== Personal life ==
In 2002, at age 17, Ecclestone dated Jonathan Ketterman (who later changed his name to Derek Rose). The relationship ended acrimoniously, and they had no contact for the next 10 years. In 2013, Ketterman was found guilty of attempting to blackmail her for $200,000 and sentenced to four years in prison.

Ecclestone married Jay Rutland in June 2013. They have two daughters, Sophia and Serena.

The family resides in a house in Kensington Palace Gardens in London that was purchased for £45 million in 2011. On 13 December 2019, Ecclestone's house was burgled and jewellery with a reported total value of £26 million stolen, despite 24-hour security patrols and extensive surveillance measures. In January 2020, a Romanian woman, Maria Mester, and her son were arrested in possession of some of the jewels at Heathrow Airport and subsequently charged with conspiracy to commit burglary, allegedly as part of a support team. The pair were subsequently cleared of all charges.

In 2021, three male Italian nationals were convicted and sentenced to jail terms for committing the robbery.
