= The Manor (Los Angeles) =

Estate in Holmby Hills, Los Angeles, California, United States

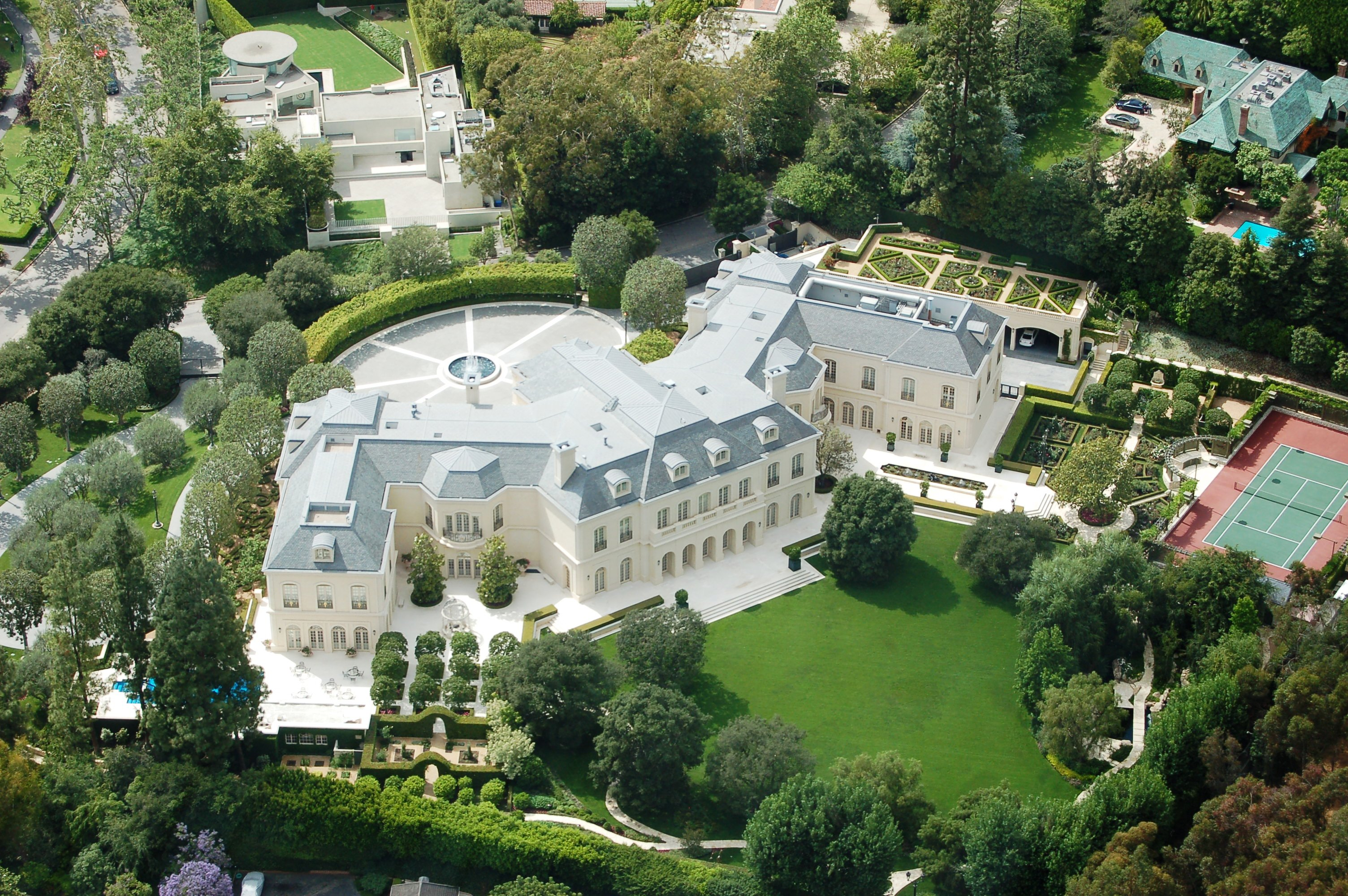

- Location within the Los Angeles metropolitan area The Manor (California) The Manor (the United States)

General information
- Type: House
- Architectural style: Châteauesque
- Location: 594 S Mapleton Drive; Holmby Hills, Los Angeles, California
- Coordinates: 34°04′23.96″N 118°25′42.00″W
- Construction started: 1988
- Owner: Eric Schmidt
- Governing body: Private

Technical details
- Floor area: 56,500 square feet (5,250 m^{2})

Design and construction
- Architects: James Langenheim & Associates

The Manor (also known as Spelling Manor and Candyland) is a mansion on Mapleton Drive in the Holmby Hills neighborhood of Los Angeles, across the street from Holmby Park and bordering the Los Angeles Country Club. Aaron Spelling (the television producer of series including Dynasty, Charlie's Angels, The Love Boat, Fantasy Island, 7th Heaven, Melrose Place, Beverly Hills, 90210 and Charmed) built it as his private residence. Designed by architects James Langenheim & Associates, the property's construction was overseen by Spelling's wife Candy and it was finished in 1988 for $12 million.

The Manor is the second largest house by official living space in the Los Angeles metropolitan area; the mansion is also bigger than both the White House and the Taj Mahal. After Aaron's death, the property was subsequently owned by British heiress Petra Ecclestone, daughter of Formula One racing magnate Bernie Ecclestone. Ecclestone purchased the home in 2011 for $85 million after it had been on the market for two years with an asking price of $150 million, making it the most expensive residential real estate listing at the time. In June 2019, it was sold for $119.7 million, a new record in California history. It would later be sold again in August 2025 for $110 million, which was lower than the asking price of $137.5 million.

== History ==
The Spellings purchased the former Bing Crosby Estate in 1983, razing the mansion that previously occupied the site, which was built in 1932 by Gordon Kaufmann and later owned by Bing Crosby. Construction began in 1986, with over 150 workers a day, using over 500 tons of steel, and was completed in 1991. The name was chosen by daughter Tori. Candy and interior designer Robert Dally spent eight years buying furnishings from England, Italy, and France, including all of the house's fireplaces, chandeliers, and sconces. The grand staircase in the entrance hall is a single piece of metal, made in Texas, and was inspired by Twelve Oaks in Gone with the Wind.

During planning stages, Aaron removed an entire planned additional wing as a cost-saving measure. Not understanding blueprints, Candy advised in 2011 she would not have built the house as big had she realised the scale in person. Originally there was a petting zoo planned for Tori. However, by the time the house neared completion, Tori was aged 17, negating the need for it. Spelling died in the mansion on June 23, 2006, from complications of a stroke, at age 83.

After finally making the decision to sell in 2009, in the summer of 2011, five years after her husband's death, Candy Spelling put the estate up for sale, calling it the "greatest entertainment house ever" with a "kitchen where you can cook for two or 800". In her eighteen years living at The Manor, Spelling recalled, "All the stars came through, Prince Rainier, Prince Charles, Jackie Kennedy—every star from every one of Aaron's shows." The house was sold for $85 million to Formula One heiress Petra Ecclestone.

Immediately after taking possession of it in June 2011, she overhauled the house's design, hiring designer Gavin Brodin to undertake the $20 million project, which included removing the chandeliers, wall lights and fireplace mantels. After a three-week design period, it took approximately 500 workers nine weeks to install the new furnishings Ecclestone had chosen. In 2016, she decided to sell the property, and it was on and off the market for three years.

In October 2016, The Manor was relisted with Rick Hilton and David Kramer of Hilton & Hyland with an asking price of $200 million. In February 2017, it was reported that singer Beyoncé and her husband Hip-hop mogul Jay Z had secretly visited it. In June 2019, it sold for $119.7 million, a new California record. Originally priced at $200 million, it was eventually dropped to $160 million, then sold in early July 2019 for a record $120 million to anonymous buyer In early August 2025, former CEO of Google, Eric Schmidt, purchased the manor for $110 million However, this purchase would again be a discount purchase, being less than the initial $137.5 million offered for the mansion.

== Description ==
The Manor is a 56,500 square feet (5,250 m^{2}) French chateau-style mansion with 123 rooms (27 bathrooms and 14 bedrooms) on 4.68 acres of land. When first built, it included a screening room, a room for Candy's antique doll collection, gift-wrapping and flower-cutting rooms, a barbershop, a humidity-controlled storage room, four two-car garages, a tennis court, and a pool. Other notable features include two walk-in closets, a gigantic kitchen, a driveway to a circular granite motor court, a solarium, a wine cellar, a basement bowling alley and game room, a gym and tanning rooms.

=== Features ===
- The grand foyer has a monochrome colour scheme with a sweeping double staircase, black and white marble flooring, a crystal floating castle chandelier and Renaissance-style paintings.
- The formal living room is a vast white-on-white space with three separate seating areas, an open marble fireplace and a grand piano.
- The second living room is less formal and is decorated in a cool grey palette. The original bookcases have been swapped for two aquariums and a bar. It has twin French doors.
- The formal dining room has a monochrome colour scheme. A 20-seater dining table sits below a low-hanging crystal chandelier crowned by a black ceiling rose. French doors lead to the expansive gardens.
- The master suite has 7,000 square feet (650 m^{2}) of living space and includes a kitchen, a living room, his and hers closets and bathrooms and a bedroom decorated in black, white and grey.
- A massive bathroom with a soaking tub, cove ceiling and three wall-length vanity mirrors makes up just one of the home’s 27 bathrooms. The beauty salon, which once housed Candy Spelling's doll collection, has a monochromatic colour scheme.
- The cinema has 20 custom theatre seats spread over two tiers with carpeted flooring, a coffered ceiling and a movie screen that rises from the floor. The basement is designed to resemble a nightclub with a bar, a pool room and a two-lane bowling alley.

== Reception and legacy ==
After its completion, Los Angeles Times architecture critic Sam Hall Kaplan panned the home as one of the region's worst built in the 1980s. At the time of its construction, the project spawned a controversy over its massive size and ostentatious architecture. In April 1988, the Los Angeles Times asked:

What's bigger than a football field, smaller than Hearst Castle, has a bowling alley and an entire floor of closets, and is making some people very annoyed? Aaron and Candy Spelling's 56,500-square-foot (5,250 m^{2}) mansion in Holmby Hills. The French chateau, under construction now for two years, has turned the corner of Mapleton and Club View drives into a gawker's paradise. Sprawled across 6 acres (2.4 ha) on what once was the Bing Crosby estate, the house dwarfs the sizable mansions on the block and looms large over tranquil Holmby Park near Wilshire Boulevard.

Performer John Perry composed a calypso/rap novelty song about the house, "The Ballad of Aaron and Candy (An Ode to Spelling's Dwelling)", including these lyrics:

See Candy's jewels, see Aaron's money,
Aaron doesn't think being picked on is funny.
See Candy's clothes, see Aaron's pad
See Aaron and Candy's castle make the neighbors mad.
But they're livin' in splendor high above the crowds
60,000 square feet of heaven.
That's Spelling's dwelling, I said
Spelling's Dwelling....

In the movie Legally Blonde, Elle Woods (Reese Witherspoon) described her social standing to Warner Huntington III (Matthew Davis): "I grew up in Bel Air [sic], Warner. Across the street from Aaron Spelling." In 2011, HGTV aired a program titled Selling Spelling Manor that included a tour of the house and documented Candy's process of selling the home to Ecclestone. In 2006, the house was discussed in Aaron's obituary:

Mr. Spelling himself, though a self-effacing and extremely shy man in private, put his own vast wealth on display in the late 1980s when he and his wife, Candy, supervised the construction of their home in the Holmby Hills section of Los Angeles. The structure, which like his shows drew mostly scathing reviews, eventually contained 123 rooms over about 56,000 square feet (5,200 m^{2}). It was said to include a bowling alley, an ice rink and an entire wing devoted to his wife's wardrobe.

== See also ==
- List of largest houses in the Los Angeles Metropolitan Area
- List of largest houses in the United States
