= The Trackers (film) =

1971 TV film

- Genre: Western
- Written by: Gerald Gaiser
- Directed by: Earl Bellamy
- Starring: Ernest Borgnine; Sammy Davis Jr. Julie Adams
- Music by: Johnny Mandel
- Country of origin: United States
- Original language: English

Production
- Executive producer: Aaron Spelling
- Producers: Sammy Davis Jr. Aaron Spelling
- Cinematography: Tim Southcott
- Editor: Saul Caplan
- Running time: 74 minutes
- Production company: Aaron Spelling Productions

Original release
- Network: ABC
- Release: December 14, 1971

The Trackers is a 1971 American Western television film directed by Earl Bellamy. It stars Ernest Borgnine, Sammy Davis Jr. and Julie Adams. The film was originally a television pilot that appeared on the ABC Movie of the Week.

== Plot ==
In the Old West, a man hires a tracker to find his kidnapped daughter. Sam Paxton and his wife Dora return home to find their son shot to death and their teenage daughter kidnapped by a mysterious raiding party. When a posse led by local sheriff Naylor proves ineffective, Paxton sends an old Confederate war buddy named Charlie Gordon, but instead arrives Ezekiel Smith, an Abilene, Texas lawman who is substituting for a badly injured Gordon.

Half the posse quits on the spot. The small band that remains insist on elderly scout Ben Vogel taking point instead, until Vogel is shot dead from ambush. Adding to the nervousness, Ezekiel says the daughter was kidnapped not by traditional outlaws but by Apache Indians. When the trail leads into Mexico (out of American jurisdiction), everybody deserts Paxton except Ezekiel. The nearest US Cavalry post turns them down, saying entering Mexico would be an act of war.

The two-man posse stops to pray at a monastery and Father Gomez promises them shelter there if they ever need it. The solution turns out to be a mix of the two suspected criminals. A crime lord named El Grande operates out of Mexico and usually hires starving renegade Indians to do his dirty work. The daughter, along with three other women, are locked in a shed prior to being sold for prostitution. Ezekiel infiltrates as an outlaw looking for work. Paxton barges in unannounced, and Ezekiel has to pretend he is a cop and starts a bar brawl to divert suspicions. Paxton is locked up, but Ezekiel manages to spring him and the three girls once he has earned the gang's trust.

The girls ride on ahead while the now-friendly duo cover their retreat. Once they reach American soil, the US Cavalry can legally fire on the pursuing gang and with their leader killed, they retreat. Having finally made a new friend, Ezekiel heads back to his Texas Marshal job.

== Cast ==
- Sammy Davis Jr as Ezekiel Smith
- Ernest Borgnine as Sam Paxton
- Julie Adams as Dora Paxton
- Connie Kreski as Becky Paxton
- Norman Alden as Pete Dilworth
- Jim Davis as Sheriff Naylor
- Caleb Brooks as El Grande
- Arthur Hunnicutt as Ben Vogel
- Leo Gordon as Higgins
- David Renard as Father Gomez
- Bill Katt as Davey Paxton
- Ross Elliott as Captain
- Lee de Broux as Bartender
- Bucklind Noah Beery as Wagon Driver

== Production ==
Filming started in New Mexico on April 22, 1971.

== Reception ==
The Los Angeles Times called it "trash", "flabby" and "unimaginative".
