= Malibu Shores =

- Genre: Teen drama; Soap opera
- Created by: Meg Richman
- Starring: Keri Russell; Tony Lucca; Christian Campbell; Katie Wright; Greg Vaughan; Tia Texada; Charisma Carpenter; Jacob Vargas; Randy Spelling; Walter Jones; Susan Ward; Essence Atkins; Ian Ogilvy; Michelle Phillips
- Theme music composer: Dan Foliart
- Composers: Jeff Eden Fair; Ken Harrison; Starr Parodi
- Country of origin: United States
- Original language: English
- No. of seasons: 1
- No. of episodes: 10

Production
- Executive producers: Joel J. Feigenbaum; E. Duke Vincent; Aaron Spelling
- Producer: Joseph B. Wallenstein
- Cinematography: Robert Primes
- Editor: John Duffy
- Running time: 45–48 minutes
- Production company: Spelling Entertainment

Original release
- Network: NBC
- Release: March 9 – June 1, 1996

Malibu Shores is an American primetime teen drama that aired on Saturdays at 8:00PM EST from March to June 1996 for ten episodes on NBC. Created by Aaron Spelling and starring Keri Russell and Tony Lucca, the program followed the exploits of Southern California teens.

== Plot ==
The show revolves around two different lifestyles that clashed repeatedly. On one side of the tracks was the wealthy Malibu crowd, and on the other was the more working-class gang of "the Valley". When Zack (Tony Lucca) from the Valley meets Chloe (Keri Russell) from the Malibu beachfront, they fall in love; but no one thinks it is a good idea but the two of them. After their "love-at-first-sight" meeting, Zach is transferred to Chloe's school along with his friends (due to an earthquake). The remainder of the episodes dealt with the clashing of the two groups.

=== Cancellation ===
Malibu Shores debuted as a midseason replacement and was initially picked up for six episodes (including a two-hour pilot episode). Scheduled on Saturdays at 8:00 p.m., the series drew low ratings and was canceled within one season.

== Cast ==
=== Main ===
- Keri Russell as Chloe Walker, a high school girl from Malibu
- Tony Lucca as Zack Morrison, a high school boy from the Valley
- Christian Campbell as Teddy Delacourt, Chloe's neighbor
- Katie Wright as Nina Gerard, Chloe's best friend, who struggles to fit in
- Greg Vaughan as Josh Walker, Chloe's jock brother, who has a drinking problem
- Tia Texada as Kacey Martinez, Zack's fiery Latina ex-girlfriend
- Charisma Carpenter as Ashley Green, the most popular girl at Pacific Coast High
- Jacob Vargas as Benny, Zack's friend
- Randy Spelling as Flipper Gage, Zack's friend, who harbors a crush on Ashley
- Walter Jones as Michael "Mouse" Hammon, Zack's friend, who harbors a crush on Julie
- Susan Ward as Bree, Ashley's friend
- Essence Atkins as Julie Tate, Ashley's friend
- Ian Ogilvy as Marc Delacourt, Teddy's photographer father
- Michelle Phillips as Suki Walker, Chloe and Josh's attorney mother, who is separated from their alcoholic surgeon father

=== Guest stars ===
- Lee Garlington and Ernie Lively as Zack's parents
- Brian Austin Green as Sandy Gage, Flipper's drug dealer brother
- Barry Watson as Seth, popular jock who later dates Kacey
- Gregg Henry as Jack Walker, Chloe and Josh's estranged father
- Tori Spelling as Jill, a bartender who has a fling with Josh
- Leigh Taylor-Young and Stan Ivar as Ashley's parents
- Kristen Miller as Martha Lewis, class nerd who later becomes class president and gets a make-over from Ashley

== Episodes ==
No.	Title	Directed by	Written by	Original release date	Prod. code
1	"Pilot"	Christopher Leitch	Story by : Meg Richman; Teleplay by : Meg Richman & Kathleen Rowell	March 9, 1996	1495006-A
2	"Pilot"	Christopher Leitch	Story by : Meg Richman; Teleplay by : Meg Richman & Kathleen Rowell	March 9, 1996	1495006-B
3	"New Kids in Town"	Chip Chalmers	Kathleen Rowell	March 16, 1996	3995001
4	"Against the Wall"	Mark Sobel	Joel J. Feigenbaum	March 23, 1996	3995002
5	"The Lie"	Marina Sargenti	Kathleen Rowell, John Eisendrath & Bay Walker	March 30, 1996	3995003
6	"Cheating Hearts"	Patrick R. Norris	John Eisendrath	April 6, 1996	3995004
7	"The Competitive Edge"	David Semel	Kathleen Rowell	April 13, 1996	3995005
8	"The Road Not Taken"	Martha Mitchell	Joel J. Feigenbaum	April 20, 1996	3995006
9	"Hotline"	David Semel	John Eisendrath	May 25, 1996	3995007
10	"The Fall"	Mark Sobel	Kathleen Rowell	June 1, 1996	3995008

== Awards and nominations ==
Year	Award	Result	Category	Recipient
1996	NCLR Bravo Awards	Nominated	Outstanding Actress in a Drama Series	Tia Texada
