= International Sportsworld Communicators =

British motorsport promoter

North One Sports
- Type: Private (subsidiary of North One Television)
- Industry: Media
- Founded: 1982
- Founder: Bernie Ecclestone
- Headquarters: London, U.K.
- Key people: Simon Long, CEO Mark Hendy FD
- Products: Broadcasting

North One Sports, formerly known as International Sportsworld Communicators (ISC), is a United Kingdom based company which owned the commercial rights to the World Rally Championship between 1996 and 2012.

== History ==
ISC logo

Bernie Ecclestone founded ISC in July 1982. In 1996 ISC signed a 14-year agreement with the FIA for the exclusive broadcasting rights for 18 FIA championships. In 1999, the European Commission investigated FIA, ISC and FOA for abusing dominant position and restricting competition. As a result, in early 2000 the ISC and FIA made a new agreement to reduce the number of rights packages to two, the World Rally and Regional Rally Championships. In April 2000 Ecclestone sold ISC to a group led by David Richards. In October 2007, North One Television purchased ISC. In 2009, the FIA announced that ISC had been awarded the tender to act as promoter of the World Rally Championship, with the ten year deal set to run until 2020.

In June 2001, Simon Long joined International Sportsworld Communicators as Sales Director before later being promoted to Media Director. In June 2003 Simon was appointed to the position of CEO of ISC replacing William Morrison.

In February 2010 ISC was renamed North One Sports. North One Sports were acquired by the sports marketing group Convers Sports Initiatives (CSI) in March 2011. CSI entered administration in November 2011, resulting in the FIA terminating its contact with North One Sport ahead of the 2012 World Rally Championship season.
