= Aaron Spelling =

American film and television producer (1923–2006)

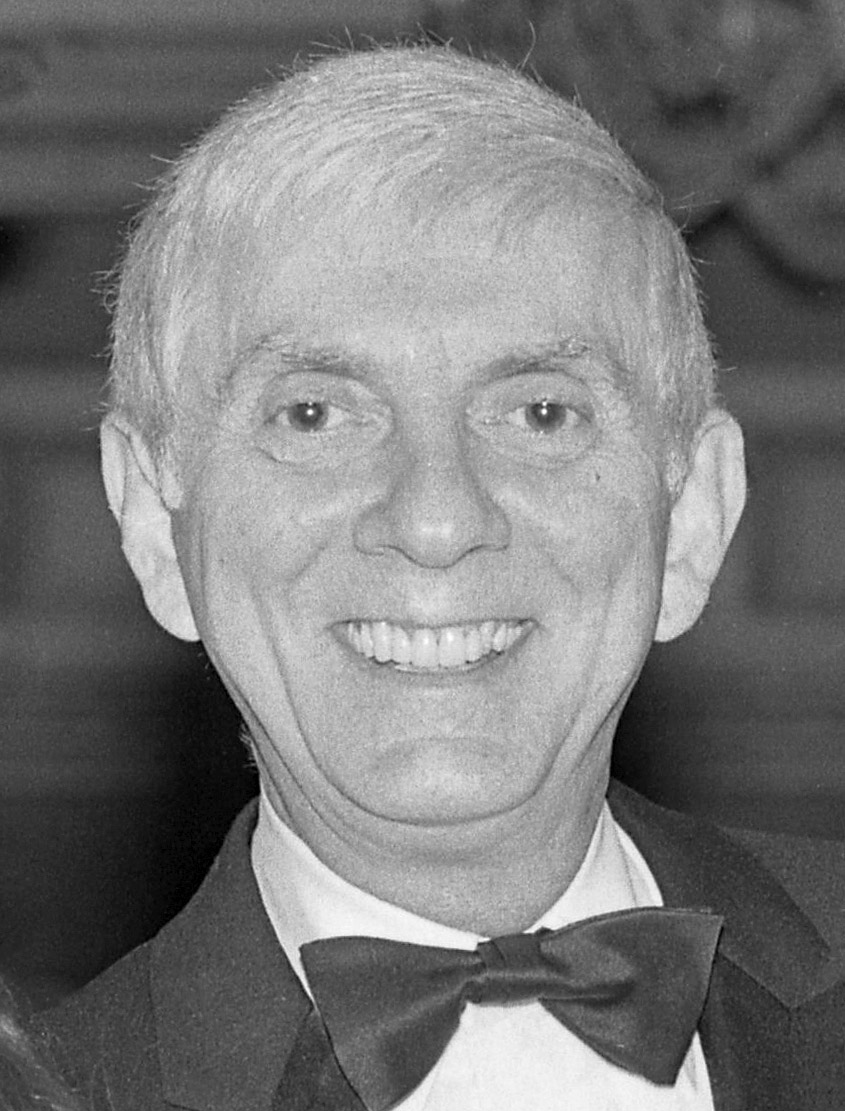
- Spelling in 1985
- Born: April 22, 1923; Dallas, Texas, U.S.
- Died: June 23, 2006 (aged 83); Los Angeles, California, U.S.
- Resting place: Hillside Memorial Park Cemetery
- Education: Southern Methodist University
- Occupations: Film producer; television producer; actor
- Years active: 1953–2006
- Known for: Founder of Spelling Television
- Spouses: Carolyn Jones (m. 1953; div. 1964) Candy Marer (m. 1968)
- Children: Tori; Randy

Aaron Spelling (April 22, 1923 – June 23, 2006) was an American film and television producer and occasional actor. His productions included the television series Family (1976–1980); Charlie's Angels (1976–1981); The Love Boat (1977–1986); Hart to Hart (1979–1984); Dynasty (1981–1989); Beverly Hills, 90210 (1990–2000); Melrose Place (1992–1999); 7th Heaven (1996–2007); and Charmed (1998–2006). He also served as producer of The Mod Squad (1968–1973), The Rookies (1972–1976) and Sunset Beach (1997–1999).

Through his production company Spelling Television, Spelling holds the record as the most prolific television producer in American television history, with 218 producer and executive producer credits. He is also acknowledged to have produced more than 3,000 hours of television, which was at one point a record as well. Forbes ranked him the 11th-highest-earning deceased celebrity in 2009.

== Early life ==
Spelling was born in Dallas, Texas. He was the son of David Spelling and Pearl Spelling (née Wald), Russian Jewish immigrants. His father worked as a tailor and changed his surname from Sperling (German for Sparrow) to Spelling after immigrating to the United States. His mother had previously been married to Sam Seltzer, who was murdered in 1911, the year before she married Spelling's father. Spelling was the youngest of five children. He had two older brothers, Sam (1916–2001) and Daniel Spelling (1921–2009), and two older half-siblings, Max Seltzer (1907–1975) and Becky Seltzer Giller (1910–1978).

At the age of eight, Spelling psychosomatically lost the use of his legs due to trauma caused by constant anti-semitic bullying from his schoolmates, and was confined to bed for a year. He made a full recovery.

Spelling attended Forest Avenue High School in Dallas. During World War II, he served in the United States Army Air Corps as an entertainer on a troop ship and a correspondent for Stars and Stripes. In 1949 he graduated from Southern Methodist University, where he was a cheerleader.

== Career ==
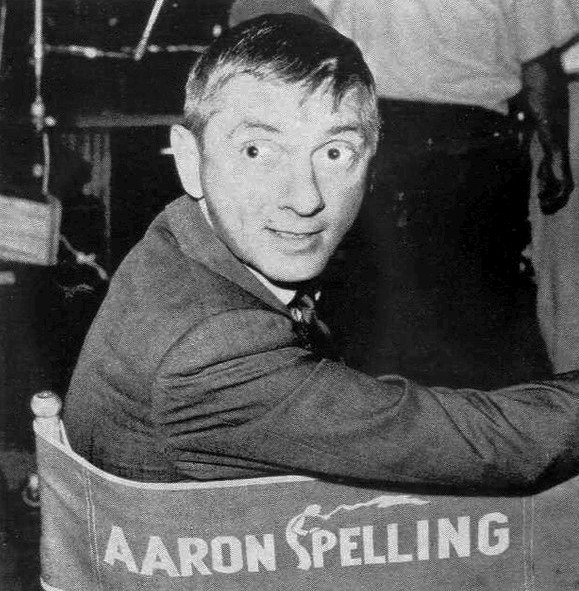
Spelling in 1965

Spelling made his first appearance as an actor in a film as Harry Williams in Vicki, directed by Harry Horner, in 1953. That same year, he appeared in the TV series I Led Three Lives and Dragnet (six episodes, 1953–55). Spelling appeared in episode 112 of I Love Lucy ("Tennessee Bound", season 4, 1955); in Alfred Hitchcock Presents ("Breakdown", 1955); and as Weed Pindle in Gunsmoke's season one, episode 35, "The Guitar" (1956). He continued to appear in films and TV (often uncredited) over 25 times by 1957, appearing briefly as an actor in 1963, 1995 and 1998 (all uncredited).

He guest-starred in 1954 as a dogcatcher in the premiere episode of the CBS situation comedy, Willy, starring June Havoc as a young lawyer in New Hampshire, who later relocates to New York City to represent a vaudeville troupe.

Spelling sold his first script "Twenty Dollar Bride" to The Jane Wyman Show in 1956. He gained experience as a producer and additional credits as a script writer working for Four Star Television on the series Zane Grey Theater, which aired between 1956 and 1961. Of the 149 episodes in that series, he wrote 20 of the teleplays and produced many others. Spelling produced Burke's Law while at Four Star. The show was the first success for Spelling and pioneered the multiple guest star format, later seen on The Love Boat and Fantasy Island. In 1965, he quit Four Star to set up his own production company with a two-year agreement with United Artists Television to produce television shows and movies.

Thomas-Spelling Productions was a television production company formed by comedian Danny Thomas and producer Aaron Spelling on April 15, 1966, as a partnership with 24 properties. Thomas continued his existing partnership, T&L Productions, with Sheldon Leonard. The company adapted its name by July 18, 1966, when it announced the financial involvement of ABC with its first show, Range (later Rango), a half-hour comedy western starring Tim Conway and its rented space on Desilu Productions' Gower lot. ABC also picked up another show for a pilot, just in an outline treatment, in The Guns of Will Sonnett. Thomas-Spelling Productions' active operations ended with the last season of The Mod Squad in 1972. Spelling formed a new partnership with Leonard Goldberg, Spelling-Goldberg Productions.

Beginning in 1965, Spelling began producing successful television shows including The Mod Squad, The Rookies, Family, Charlie's Angels, Fantasy Island, The Love Boat, Dynasty, Beverly Hills, 90210 (which starred his daughter Tori), Melrose Place, 7th Heaven, Charmed, Jane's House and Sunset Beach. Spelling founded Spelling Entertainment in 1965, alongside partnerships with comedian/actor Danny Thomas (Thomas-Spelling Productions, 1966–1972), and television/film producer Leonard Goldberg (Spelling-Goldberg Productions, 1972–1986) He produced the unsuccessful sitcom The San Pedro Beach Bums in 1977.

In 2004, Spelling was portrayed in two television movies: Dan Castellaneta portrayed Spelling in Behind the Camera: The Unauthorized Story of Charlie's Angels, and Nicholas Hammond portrayed Spelling in television movie Dynasty: The Making of a Guilty Pleasure.

== Personal life ==
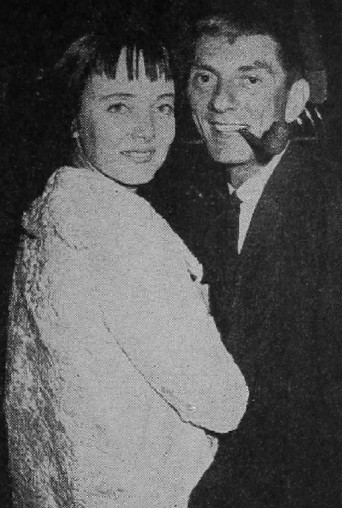
Carolyn Jones and Spelling in 1960

Spelling married actress Carolyn Jones in 1953, when he was 30 and she was 23. They divorced in 1964. He briefly dated actress Jill Haworth when he was 42 and she was 19. Spelling married the former Candy Marer in 1968 when he was 45 and she was 23. The couple had daughter Tori in 1973 and son Randy in 1978.

In 1988, Spelling bought the 6-acre (2.4 ha) property of Bing Crosby's former Los Angeles mansion. He demolished the property and built a 123-room home on the lot in 1991. Known as "The Manor," it has 56,500 square feet (5,250 m^{2}) of floor space and as of 2006 was the largest single-family home in Los Angeles. Spelling's widow Candy listed the home for sale in 2008 for $150 million. Heiress Petra Ecclestone ultimately purchased the property for $85 million in 2011 through a brokered agreement that was developed by Brandon Davis, the brother of Jason Davis and grandson of wealthy industrialist Marvin Davis.

In 1992, Candy Spelling, Spelling's second wife, commissioned pinball manufacturer Data East to produce a personalized table as a gift to Spelling. The game, a modified version of Data East's Lethal Weapon 3 table, has since appeared publicly at collector's expos.

At his death, Spelling's estate was valued at $500 million. He reportedly willed $800,000 to each of his children and left the bulk of the estate to his second wife, who also served as the estate executor. Candy would eventually set up trust funds for both of the two children from the estate money by 2022.

== Legacy and death ==
On September 15, 1978, Spelling was honored with a star on the Hollywood Walk of Fame located at 6667 Hollywood Blvd. In 1996, he was inducted into the Television Hall of Fame.

In 1983, he was accorded the NAACP Humanitarian Award for his monetary donation that permitted a 21-year-old's heart transplant operation.

In 2001, Spelling was diagnosed with oral cancer.

On June 23, 2006, Spelling died at The Manor, his estate in Holmby Hills, Los Angeles, from complications of a stroke he suffered five days prior. He also suffered from Alzheimer's disease. A private funeral was held several days later, and Spelling was entombed in a mausoleum in Culver City's Hillside Memorial Park Cemetery.

At the time of his death, Spelling held a place in The Guinness Book of World Records for the most hours of television produced, with more than 3,000 hours to his name.

On August 27, 2006, Spelling was posthumously honored at the 58th Annual Primetime Emmy Awards by former employees Joan Collins, Stephen Collins, Heather Locklear, Farrah Fawcett, Kate Jackson and Jaclyn Smith.

Spelling would be the subject of the December 22, 2006 special episode of A&E Biography.

7th Heaven's May 13, 2007, episode, the last before the series finale, was dedicated to Spelling. When 7th Heaven ended its run, it was touted by the network as being Spelling's longest-running series and the longest-running "family drama" in American television history.

From January to May 2022, the Austin Film Society released, via its YouTube channel a five chapter documentary about Spelling's work titled History of Television: Masters & Methods: Aaron Spelling.

Documentary The Spelling Family's $500 Million Inheritance War, which was released by YouTube channel Star Power - Celebrity Documentaries & Biographies on February 16, 2026, would also detail some aspects of Spelling's life, while also focusing mainly on the years long feud between his wife and their daughter over his high valued estate.

== Filmography ==
Spelling was a producer in all films unless otherwise noted.

=== Film ===
Year	Film	Credit
1953	Vicki	Harry Williams
1960	Guns of the Timberland	
1974	California Split	Executive producer
1976	Baby Blue Marine	
1983	Mr. Mom	Executive producer
1986	'night, Mother	
1987	Surrender	
1987	Three O'Clock High	Executive producer
1987	Cross My Heart	Executive producer
1988	Satisfaction	
1990	Loose Cannons	
1991	Soapdish	
1999	The Mod Squad	Executive producer
2000	Charlie's Angels	Executive producer

As writer

Year	Film
1960	Guns of the Timberland
1960	One Foot in Hell

As an actor

Year	Film	Role	Notes
1953	Vicki	Harry Williams	
1954	Three Young Texans	Catur	
1954	Alaska Seas	The Knifer	
1954	Black Widow	Mr. Oliver	Uncredited
1954	The Bamboo Prison	Skinny	Uncredited
1955	Wyoming Renegades	Petie Carver	
1955	Mad at the World	Willie Hanson	
1955	Target Zero	Pfc. Strangler	Uncredited
1955	Kismet	Beggar	Uncredited
1955	Dementia	Nightclub Patron	Uncredited
1957	The Spirit of St. Louis	Mr. Fearless	Uncredited

=== Television ===
Year	Title	Credit	Notes
1955	I Love Lucy	Gas Station Man	Episode: "Tennessee Bound"
1959−60	Johnny Ringo		
1961	The DuPont Show with June Allyson		
1959−61	Zane Grey Theatre		
1961−63	The Dick Powell Show		
1962−63	The Lloyd Bridges Show	Executive producer	
1965	The Decorator	Executive producer	Television short
1963−66	Burke's Law		
1965−66	Honey West	Executive producer	
1965−66	The Smothers Brothers Show	Executive producer	
1967	Rango		
1967	Off to See the Wizard	Executive producer	
1967	Cricket on the Hearth	Executive producer	Television film
1968	The Danny Thomas Hour		
1967−69	The Guns of Will Sonnett		
1969	The Over-the-Hill Gang	Executive producer	Television film
1969	Wake Me When the War Is Over	Executive producer	Television film
1969	The Monk	Executive producer	Television film
1969	The Pigeon	Executive producer	Television film
1969	The Ballad of Andy Crocker	Executive producer	Television film
1969−70	The New People	Executive producer	
1970	Carter's Army	Executive producer	Television film
1970	The Love War		Television film
1970	Death Valley Days		
1970	How Awful About Allan	Executive producer	Television film
1970	But I Don't Want to Get Married!		Television film
1970	The Old Man Who Cried Wolf	Executive producer	Television film
1970	Wild Women	Executive producer	Television film
1970	The House That Would Not Die		Television film
1970	The Over-the-Hill Gang Rides Again	Executive producer	Television film
1970	Crowhaven Farm	Executive producer	Television film
1970	Run, Simon, Run		Television film
1970−71	The Young Rebels	Executive producer	
1970−71	The Most Deadly Game	Executive producer	
1971	Love Hate Love	Executive producer	Television film
1971	Yuma		Television film
1971	River of Gold	Executive producer	Television film
1971	Congratulations, It's a Boy!		Television film
1971	Five Desperate Women		Television film
1971	The Last Child	Executive producer	Television film
1971	A Taste of Evil		Television film
1971	In Broad Daylight	Executive producer	Television film
1971	The Death of Me Yet		Television film
1971	The Reluctant Heroes	Executive producer	Television film
1971	If Tomorrow Comes	Executive producer	Television film
1971	The Trackers	Executive producer	Television film
1972	Two for the Money	Executive producer	Television film
1972	The Daughters of Joshua Cabe	Executive producer	Television film
1972	No Place to Run		Television film
1972	Say Goodbye, Maggie Cole		Television film
1972	Rolling Man	Executive producer	Television film
1972	The Bounty Man		Television film
1972	Home for the Holidays	Executive producer	Television film
1972	Every Man Needs One	Executive producer	Television film
1973	A Cold Night's Death	Executive producer	Television film
1973	Snatched	Executive producer	Television film
1973	The Great American Beauty Contest	Executive producer	Television film
1973	The Letters		Television film
1973	The Bait		Television film
1973	Satan's School for Girls		Television film
1973	Hijack!	Executive producer	Television film
1973	Letters from Three Lovers	Executive producer	Television film
1973	The Affair	Executive producer	Television film
1973	Stone	Co-executive producer	Television film
1968−73	The Mod Squad	Executive producer	
1974	The Death Squad		Television film
1974	Firehouse	Executive producer	
1974	Chopper One	Executive producer	
1974	The Girl Who Came Gift-Wrapped		Television film
1974	Cry Panic		Television film
1974	Savages		Television film
1974	Death Sentence		Television film
1974	Hit Lady		Television film
1974	Death Cruise		Television film
1974	Only with Married Men	Executive producer	Television film
1974	The Fireman's Ball	Executive producer	Television film
1975	The Daughters of Joshua Cabe Return	Executive producer	Television film
1975	The Fireman's Ball	Executive producer	Television pilot
1975	Murder on Flight 502	Executive producer	Television film
1975	The Legend of Valentino	Executive producer	Television film
1976	One of My Wives Is Missing	Executive producer	Television film
1976	The New Daughters of Joshua Cabe	Executive producer	Television film
1976	Death at Love House	Executive producer	Television film
1976	33 Hours in the Life of God		Television film
1976	The Sad and Lonely Sundays	Executive producer	Television film
1976	The Boy in the Plastic Bubble	Executive producer	Television film
1972−76	The Rookies	Executive producer	
1975−76	S.W.A.T.	Executive producer	
1977	Little Ladies of the Night	Executive producer	Television film
1977	The Love Boat II	Executive producer	Television film
1977	The San Pedro Bums	Executive producer	Television pilot
1977	The San Pedro Beach Bums	Executive producer	
1978	Cruise Into Terror		Television film
1978	Wild and Wooly	Executive producer	Television film
1978	Kate Bliss and the Ticker Tape Kid	Executive producer	Television film
1978	The Users	Executive producer	Television film
1979	Friends	Executive producer	
1979	Beach Patrol	Executive producer	Television film
1979	The Power Within	Executive producer	Television film
1979	The Return of the Mod Squad	Executive producer	Television film
1979	Love's Savage Fury	Executive producer	Television film
1979	The French Atlantic Affair	Executive producer	
1975−79	Starsky & Hutch	Executive producer	
1980	Waikiki	Executive producer	Television film
1980	Murder Can Hurt You!	Executive producer	Television film
1980	Casino	Executive producer	Television film
1980	B.A.D. Cats	Executive producer	
1976−80	Family	Executive producer	
1981	Aloha Paradise	Executive producer	
1981	The Best Little Girl in the World	Executive producer	Television film
1981	Sizzle	Executive producer	Television film
1976−81	Charlie's Angels	Executive producer	
1978−81	Vegas	Executive producer	
1981−82	Strike Force	Executive producer	
1982	Massarati and the Brain	Executive producer	Television film
1982	Scared Silly	Executive producer	Television pilot
1982	The Wild Women of Chastity Gulch	Executive producer	Television film
1982	Don't Go to Sleep	Executive producer	Television film
1983	At Ease	Executive producer	
1983	Shooting Stars	Executive producer	Television film
1983	Venice Medical	Executive producer	Television short
1983	Making of a Male Model	Executive producer	Television film
1984	Dark Mirror	Executive producer	Television film
1984	Velvet		Television film
1977−84	Fantasy Island	Executive producer	
1979−84	Hart to Hart	Executive producer	
1985	Hollywood Wives	Executive producer	
1985	MacGruder and Loud	Executive producer	
1985	International Airport	Executive producer	Television film
1985	Hollywood Beat	Executive producer	
1982−85	Matt Houston	Executive producer	
1984−85	Finder of Lost Loves	Executive producer	
1984−85	Glitter	Executive producer	
1986	Crossings	Executive producer	
1986	Mr. and Mrs. Ryan	Executive producer	Television film
1986	Dark Mansions	Executive producer	Television film
1986	Life with Lucy	Executive producer	
1982−86	T. J. Hooker	Executive producer	
1977−87	The Love Boat	Executive producer Associate producer	
1985−87	The Colbys	Executive producer	
1987	Harry's Hong Kong	Executive producer	Television film
1987	Cracked Up	Executive producer	Television film
1987	The Hope Division	Executive producer	Television film
1987	Free Spirit	Executive producer	Television film
1983−88	Hotel	Executive producer	
1988	Nightingales	Executive producer	Television pilot
1988	CBS Summer Playhouse	Executive producer	
1988	Divided We Stand	Executive producer	Television pilot
1988	The Loner	Executive producer	Television film
1989	Day One	Executive producer	Television film
1989	Nightingales	Executive producer	
1989	Just Temporary	Executive producer	Television film
1981−89	Dynasty	Executive producer	
1988−89	HeartBeat	Executive producer	
1990	Rich Men, Single Women	Executive producer	Television film
1990	The Love Boat: A Valentine Voyage	Executive producer	Television film
1990	Just Life	Executive producer	Television film
1991	Jailbirds	Executive producer	Television film
1991	Dynasty: The Reunion	Executive producer	
1992	Back to the Streets of San Francisco	Executive producer	Television film
1992	Grass Roots	Executive producer	Television film
1992	Sexual Advances	Executive producer	Television film
1992	The Heights		
1992	2000 Malibu Road	Executive producer	
1992	The Round Table	Executive producer	
1993	And the Band Played On	Executive producer	Television film
1993	A Stranger in the Mirror	Executive producer	Television film
1993	Gulf City	Executive producer	Television film
1994	Jane's House	Executive producer	Television film
1994	Winnetka Road	Executive producer	
1994	Love on the Run	Executive producer	Television film
1994	Green Dolphin Beat	Executive producer	Television film
1994	Texas	Executive producer	Television film
1994	Heaven Help Us	Executive producer	
1994−95	Models Inc.	Executive producer	
1994−95	Robin's Hoods	Executive producer	
1994−95	Madman of the People	Executive producer	
1994−95	Burke's Law	Executive producer	
1995	University Hospital	Executive producer	
1995	The Invaders	Executive producer	
1995	Crosstown Traffic	Executive producer	Television film
1996	A Season in Purgatory	Executive producer	
1996	Pier 66	Executive producer	Television film
1996	Malibu Shores	Executive producer	
1996	After Jimmy	Executive producer	Television film
1996	Kindred: The Embraced	Executive producer	
1996−97	Savannah	Executive producer	
1997	Pacific Palisades	Executive producer	
1997	Odd Jobs		Television film
1998	Love Boat: The Next Wave	Executive producer	
1998	Buddy Faro	Executive producer	
1999	Rescue 77	Executive producer	
1999	Safe Harbor	Executive producer	
1999	Forbidden Island	Executive producer	
1992−99	Melrose Place	Executive producer	
1997−99	Sunset Beach	Executive producer	
2000	Satan's School for Girls	Executive producer	Television film
1990−2000	Beverly Hills, 90210	Executive producer	
2000−01	Titans	Executive producer	
2001	Stop at Nothing		Television film
2001	All Souls	Executive producer	
2002	Home of the Brave	Executive producer	Television film
2002	Deep Cover	Executive producer	
2003	Queens Supreme	Executive producer	
2003	Kingpin	Executive producer	
2003	The Law and Mr. Lee	Executive producer	Television film
2003	Hotel	Executive producer	Television pilot
2003−04	10-8: Officers on Duty	Executive producer	
2004	Silver Lake	Executive producer	Television film
2004−05	Clubhouse	Executive producer	
2004−05	Summerland	Executive producer	
2005	Wanted	Executive producer	
2005	Hitched	Executive producer	Television film
2005	Crazy	Executive producer	Television pilot
2005	Bounty Hunters	Executive producer	Television film
1996−2006	7th Heaven	Executive producer	
1998−2006	Charmed	Executive producer	
2006	Split Decision	Executive producer	Television film

As writer

Year	Title	Notes	Other notes
1957	The Jane Wyman Show	Episode: "Twenty Dollar Bride"	
1957	Big-Foot Wallace	Television film	
1958	Playhouse 90		
1958	Decision		
1958	Westinghouse Desilu Playhouse		
1957−59	Wagon Train		
1959	The David Niven Show		
1959−60	Johnny Ringo		
1956−61	Zane Grey Theatre		
1962	The Dick Powell Show		
1962	Kraft Mystery Theater		
1962−63	The Lloyd Bridges Show		
1965−66	The Smothers Brothers Show		
1967−69	The Guns of Will Sonnett		
1969−70	The New People		
1970	Carter's Army	Television film	
1971	The Trackers	Television film	Uncredited
1974	The Rookies		

As an actor

Year	Title	Role	Notes
1953	I Led 3 Lives	Elevator Operator	
1954	The Lone Wolf	Loran Dane	
1954	Willy	Homer the dogcatcher	
1954	Treasury Men in Action	—N/a	
1955	I Love Lucy	Gas Station Man	episode "Tennessee Bound" (1955)
1955	Soldiers of Fortune	Charlie Applegood	
1955	The Man Behind the Badge	Billy	
1955	Fireside Theatre	Olaf	
1955	Alfred Hitchcock Presents	Road Worker Convict	Season 1 Episode 7: "Breakdown"
1953−55	Dragnet	Bruce Marcus 'Bigs' Donaldson Charlie Coleman Ollie Charles Boyd	
1956	Big Town	—N/a	
1956	Crusader	Andrew Hock Valentino	
1956	Gunsmoke	Weed Pindle	
1956	The Millionaire	Max	
1955−56	Studio 57	Docker Olaf	
1955−56	TV Reader's Digest	Colonel Dornet Ben Williams	
1963	Burke's Law	Harry Penn	Uncredited
1995	Beverly Hills, 90210	Executive in Limo	Uncredited
1998	Sunset Beach	Vincent Duke	Uncredited
2001	Charmed	Aaron Mourner	Uncredited

Miscellaneous crew

Year	Title	Role	Notes
1957−58	Zane Grey Theatre	Story supervisor	
1982	The Renegades	Creative consultant	Television pilot

Soundtrack

Year	Title	Role	Notes
1956	Gunsmoke	Performer: "Red River Valley"	Uncredited
1958	Zane Grey Theatre	Writer: "The Ballad of Dan Case"	Uncredited

As director

Year	Title
1959	Wagon Train

Thanks

Year	Title	Role
2006−07	7th Heaven	In memory of In loving memory of
2012	The Adventures of Dugg & Lemmy	Very special thanks

== Awards and nominations ==
Award	Year	Recipient / Work	Category	Result	Ref(s)
Britannia Awards	1999	Himself	Excellence in Television	Won	
GLAAD Media Awards	1994	Himself	Vanguard Award	Won	
Primetime Emmy Awards	1977	Family	Outstanding Drama Series	Nominated	
Primetime Emmy Awards	1978	Family	Outstanding Drama Series	Nominated	
Primetime Emmy Awards	1982	Dynasty	Outstanding Drama Series	Nominated	
Primetime Emmy Awards	1989	Day One	Outstanding Drama or Comedy Special	Won	
Primetime Emmy Awards	1994	And the Band Played On	Outstanding Television Movie	Won	
Primetime Emmy Awards	1996	Himself	Hall of Fame	Honoree	
Producers Guild of America Awards	2000	Himself	Norman Lear Achievement Award	Won	

== See also ==
- Norman Lear
- David L. Wolper
- Alan Landsburg
