= Francis Holland School =

London girls' schools near Regents Park and Sloane Square

Francis Holland Schools

Location
- Bursar's Office; 35 Bourne St; London, SW1W 8JA; England
- 51.4917°N 0.1539°W

Information
- Type: Private day school
- Motto: That our daughters may be as the polished corners of the temple
- Religious affiliation: Church of England
- Local authority: City of Westminster
- Gender: Girls
- Website: SW1 School fhs-sw1.org.uk NW1 School fhs-nw1.org.uk Prep School francishollandprep.org.uk

Francis Holland School is the name of three separate private day schools for girls in central London, England, governed by the Francis Holland (Church of England) Schools Trust. The schools are located at Clarence Gate (near Regent's Park NW1) and at Graham Terrace (near Sloane Square SW1).

== History ==
The schools were founded in the 1870s by Canon Francis James Holland for the education of girls in London. He was born in London on 20 January 1828 and educated at Eton College and Trinity College, Cambridge. The Regent's Park School is the older of the two schools but no longer has a Junior Department. Francis Holland, Regent's Park, used to accept boys as primary school pupils but they would leave as soon as the girls moved on to secondary education.

The Sloane Square School was opened with 13 pupils on 1 March 1881 at 80 Coleshill Street, Belgravia, later renamed as 28 Eaton Terrace. Within a year, the school expanded into a further property opposite but as this arrangement proved awkward, Canon Holland purchased a site on the corner of Graham Street, now Graham Terrace where a new school building was constructed ready for occupation in October 1884.

In 2005, property tycoon Achilleas Kallakis donated £250,000 to the school, which his daughter attended at the time. A theatre at the school was named after him. However, following Kallakis' 2013 arrest and imprisonment for fraud, the school removed the plaque and returned £92,500 of the donation. The returned money was subsequently seized by the Serious Fraud Office.

In 2015, Vivienne Durham, the headteacher of the Regent's Park school, said in an interview "I’m not a feminist. I believe there is a glass ceiling – if we tell them there isn’t one, we are telling them a lie. Women still have to plan for a biological fact – ie motherhood". The Guardian said that she was criticised for this.

== Francis Holland, Regent's Park ==
FHS, Regent's Park

Location
- Ivor Place; London, NW1 6XR; England

Information
- Established: 1870
- Department for Education URN: 101158 Tables
- Head: Katharine Woodcock
- Age: 11 to 18
- Enrolment: 540~
- Colour: Red
- Website: https://www.fhs-nw1.org.uk/

There are about 500 pupils at the school, and about 120 sixth-formers. Most of their sports take place in Regent's Park and Paddington Recreational Grounds.

== Francis Holland, Sloane Square ==
FHS, Sloane Square

Location
- 39 Graham Terrace; London, SW1W 8JF; England

Information
- Established: 1881
- Department for Education URN: 101161 Tables
- Head: Alexandra Haydon
- Gender: Female
- Age: 11 to 18
- Enrolment: 605~
- Houses: 4 (Ashcroft, Fontaine, Franklin, Woolf)
- Colour: Blue
- Website: https://www.fhs-sw1.org.uk/

There are over 605 pupils on roll.

Sports takes place in Battersea Park and ballet on-site, which is very popular.

== Francis Holland Prep School ==
Formerly a part of the Sloane Square school, in September 2024 the junior department was relocated to 15 Manresa Road and established as a separate prep school.

The move enabled a transition from one-form entry to two-form entry, doubling the school's enrollment from 140 to 280.

== Notable alumnae ==
Francis Holland Preparatory School
- 15 Manresa Road, SW3 6NB

Information
- Established: 2024
- Head teacher: Suzy Dixon
- Gender: Female
- Age range: 4-11
- Capacity: 280
- School fees: £9,144 - £10,044 per term
- Website: https://www.francishollandprep.org.uk/

- Rhiannon Adam, photographer
- Camilla Arfwedson, actress
- Amanda Donohoe, actress
- Eleanor Burbidge, astronomer
- Jackie Collins OBE, novelist
- Dame Joan Collins, actress and writer
- Lady Mary Charteris, singer and model
- Cara Delevingne, model
- Petra Ecclestone, fashion designer
- Tamara Ecclestone, TV presenter
- Emilia Fox, actress
- Joyce Grenfell, comedian and singer-songwriter
- Hermione Hammond, artist
- Evelyn Jamison, historian and vice principal of Lady Margaret Hall 1921 to 1937
- Elizabeth Jane Howard, novelist
- Gemma Jones, actress
- Jemima Khan (Jemima Goldsmith), journalist
- Eleni Kyriacou, fashion designer
- Susan Lawrence, Labour politician
- Octavia Lewin, (1869-1955) early UK physician and suffragist
- Sue Lloyd-Roberts, Special Correspondent for the BBC (formerly at ITN)
- Sienna Miller, actress
- Nancy Mitford, novelist and biographer
- Vanessa-Mae, violinist
- Farah Nabulsi, filmmaker
- Elizabeth Pakenham, Countess of Longford, biographer
- Tilly Ramsay, Gordon Ramsay's daughter
- Patricia Roc, actress
- Christina Scott, former Governor of Anguilla
- Sienna Spiro, singer-songwriter
- Rose Tremain, novelist
- Theresa Villiers, politician (formerly Secretary of State for Northern Ireland)
- Jennifer von Mayrhauser, costume designer
- Veronica Wadley, former editor of the Evening Standard
- Daisy Waterstone, actress
