= Candy Spelling =

American author and theater producer (born 1945)

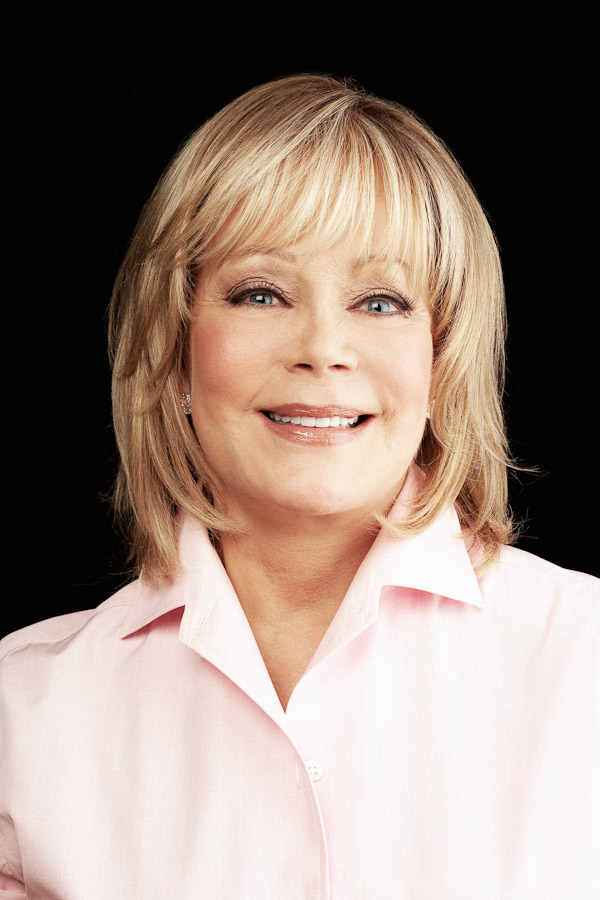
- Spelling in 2009
- Born: Carole Gene Marer; September 20, 1945 (age 81); Beverly Hills, California, U.S.
- Education: Beverly Hills High School
- Occupations: Author; philanthropist; television personality; theater producer
- Spouses: Howard Frederick Leveson (m. 1963; div. 1964) Aaron Spelling (m. 1968; died 2006)
- Children: Tori; Randy

Carole Gene "Candy" Spelling (née Marer; born September 20, 1945) is an American author, theater producer, and philanthropist. She is the widow of Aaron Spelling, to whom she was married from 1968 until he died in 2006.

== Early life and education ==
Carole Gene Marer was born in Beverly Hills, California, to Augusta (née Rosen) and Merritt Marer, and grew up in a Jewish home. She has an elder brother, Anthony Marer (born July 24, 1942). Her father was a salesman who founded a chain of furniture stores. Although initially successful, the chain failed as a result of overexpansion. She attended Beverly Hills High School and Chouinard Art Institute in Los Angeles.

== Books and television ==
Spelling's autobiography, Stories from Candyland, released in March 2009, hit The New York Times best seller list two weeks after publication. Her memoir, Candy at Last, was published by Wiley in May 2014. She has written for TMZ and the Huffington Post, among others.

In December 2011 and January 2012, Spelling produced and starred in Selling Spelling Manor, a two-episode special for HGTV that documented the process of moving from and selling her 123-room, 56,500 square foot home. In 2013, she produced and starred in Beyond Spelling Manor, a three-episode series about the construction of her subsequent residence, a $35 million condominium, and her search for an apartment in New York City. The series also aired on HGTV.

== Broadway ==
Spelling began producing theater on Broadway in 2010. Her first co-production, Promises, Promises, starred Sean Hayes and Kristin Chenoweth and was nominated for four Tony Awards. Her second Broadway show, How to Succeed in Business Without Really Trying opened with Daniel Radcliffe in the lead role. In 2012, she produced Nice Work If You Can Get It, which was nominated for 10 Tony Awards and won for Featured Actor (Michael McGrath) and Featured Actress (Judy Kaye). 2013's After Midnight, based on Duke Ellington's years at the Cotton Club, was nominated for seven Tony Awards with Warren Carlyle winning for Outstanding Choreography.

Spelling went on to produce The Color Purple, the winner of the 2016 Tony Award for Best Revival of a Musical. Cynthia Erivo, who portrayed the character Celie, won the Tony for Best Performance by an Actress in a Leading Role in a Musical. In 2018, her production credits included The Iceman Cometh, which starred Denzel Washington and received eight Tony Award nominations; the revival of the Rodgers and Hammerstein musical, Carousel, which received Tony Awards for Best Featured Actress in a Musical (Lindsay Mendez) and Best Choreography (Justin Peck); and Three Tall Women by Edward Albee, which earned Tony Awards for Laurie Metcalf (Featured Actress) and Glenda Jackson (Lead Actress).

== Philanthropy ==
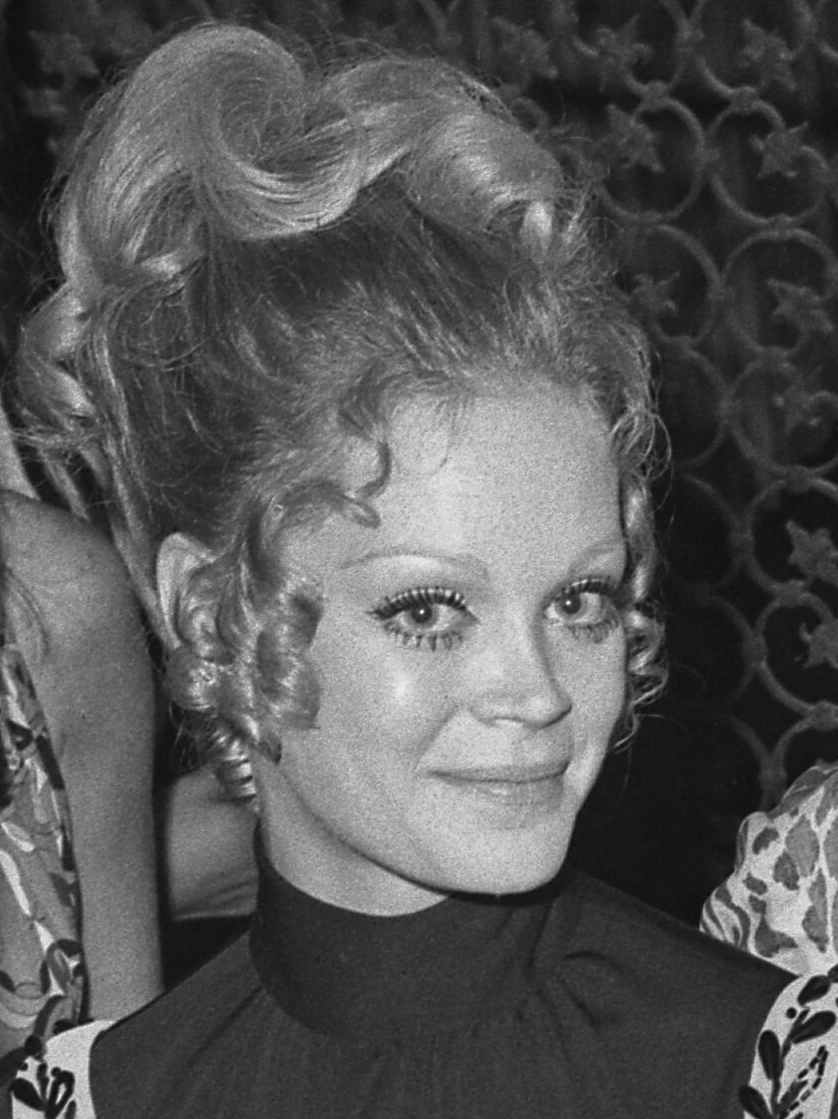
Candy Spelling in 1970

In 2012, Spelling was named to the board of directors of American Humane, an animal welfare organization. She was named vice chair of the board in 2015. She is a member of the UCLA Health System Board, a member of the board of the Los Angeles World Affairs Council, and a founding board member of the Los Angeles Parks Foundation. She helped to expand Centro De Niños, downtown Los Angeles daycare center for underprivileged families, and served for 10 years as a Board of Governors Member of LA's Best, an after-school enrichment program for children in need. She was honored for her public service by the President's Council of Service and Civic Participation.

Spelling was elected to the Board of Directors of L.A. Inc., the Los Angeles World Affairs Council, the L.A. Visitors Bureau and the Los Angeles Convention Center.

== Personal life ==
She married producer and screenwriter Aaron Spelling in 1968. The couple had two children: daughter Victoria Davey (born 1973) and son Randy Gene Spelling (born 1978). They appeared in several of Aaron's productions, most notably in Beverly Hills, 90210. She has seven grandchildren, two from Randy and five from Tori.

Spelling would serve as the executor to her husband's estate and inherit the bulk of the estate as well. Though not estranged from her son Randy, Spelling was for many years estranged from her daughter Tori, with the two finally reconciling in 2022.

In 2009, three years after her husband's death, Spelling put their Holmby Hills mansion on the market for $150 million. It was the most expensive residential listing in the United States at the time. It was sold to Petra Ecclestone for $85 million in 2011.

In January 2025 her 8,000-square foot beachfront house in Malibu, which she and her husband bought in 1972, burned down due to the Palisades Fire.

On February 16, 2026, YouTube channel Star Power - Celebrity Documentaries & Biographies would release the documentary The Spelling Family's $500 Million Inheritance War, which focused mainly on the years long feud between Spelling and her daughter over her husband's high valued estate.
