= Stefano Domenicali =

Italian motorsport executive (born 1965)

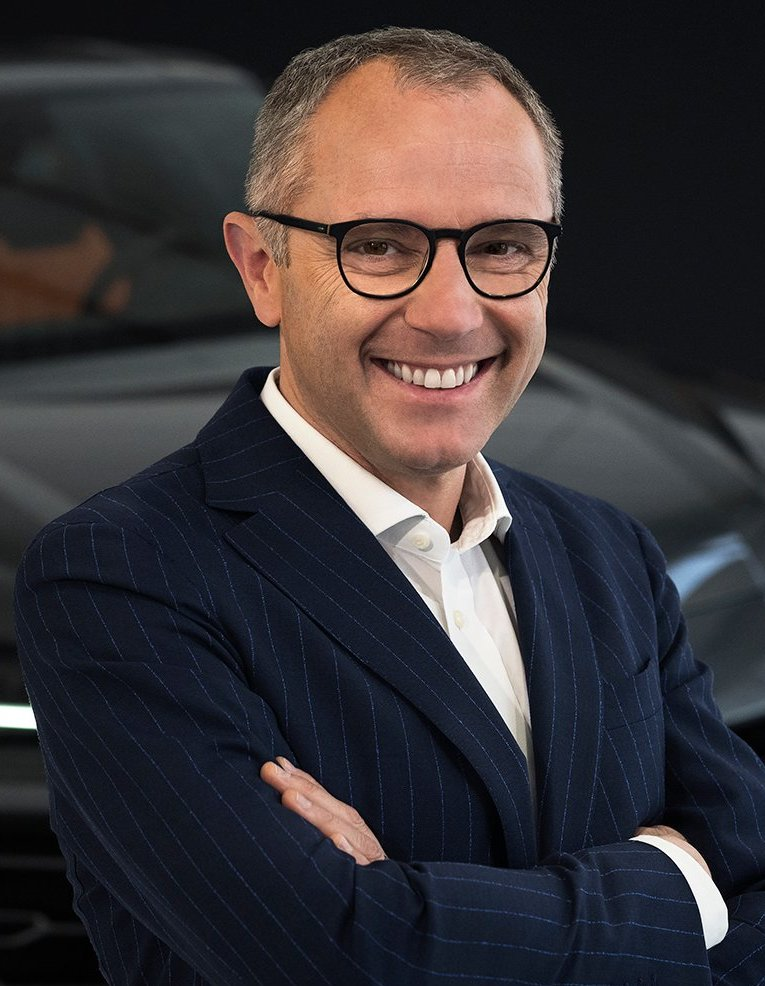
- Domenicali in 2020
- Born: 11 May 1965 (age 61); Imola, Italy
- Occupations: Former Team Principal of Ferrari (2008–2014); Former CEO and President of Automobili Lamborghini S.p.A. (2016–2020); CEO and President of Formula One Group (2021–)

Stefano Domenicali (born 11 May 1965) is an Italian motorsport executive and the current CEO of the Formula One Group since 2021.

== Early life ==
Domenicali was born in Imola, the son of a banker. As a child, he used to go to the Autodromo Enzo e Dino Ferrari racetrack at weekends to help out in the paddock and in the media centre – an experience that piqued his interest in motor racing.

== Career ==
Domenicali studied business administration at University of Bologna, graduating in 1991. Upon graduation he joined Ferrari where he worked in the finance department. Between 1992 and 1994, he was race director at Mugello and was involved in DTM and other racing series. In 1995 he was appointed head of personnel in Ferrari's sporting department and was involved with sponsorship liaison, before being promoted to Team Manager in December 1996.

He remained there until January 2001. After a brief stint as Logistics Manager, he became the team's Sporting Director in 2002. On 12 November 2007 Ferrari announced Domenicali would take on the role of Director of the Ferrari Formula One team, a position previously held by Jean Todt, and became team principal in 2008. Under his leadership, Ferrari won the 2008 Constructors' Championship, before enduring a less competitive 2009 season in which the team won only a single race. In 2010, the team won five races and finished third in the Constructors' Championship, behind Red Bull Racing and McLaren. Domenicali led the team into 2011, which saw Fernando Alonso finish fourth in the championship table, two places ahead of Felipe Massa in sixth. Then came the 2012 season, which saw Fernando Alonso just missing out on the title; a result masked by his outstanding performance, since his teammate was 156 points behind him. He and Ferrari claimed three Grand Prix victories and placed second in both the Drivers' and Constructors' Championships. He was named one of "The Men of the Year 2012" by Top Gear magazine thanks to Scuderia Ferrari's competitiveness in F1. Domenicali resigned as Ferrari team principal in April 2014.

In October 2014, Domenicali was hired by Audi. He was also appointed as head of the FIA's Single-Seater Commission. On 15 March 2016 he was appointed CEO at Automobili Lamborghini S.p.A. He was replaced by Stephan Winkelmann on 1 December 2020.

In September 2020, it was announced that Domenicali would replace Chase Carey as CEO of Formula One Group from the 2021 season.

Domenicali has also defended F1 using Qatar and Saudi Arabia for F1 races, after he was criticised. There has been widespread criticism over the use of slave labour in Persian Gulf countries.

While talking to the press on 29 July 2026 about the viability of F1 finishing its season with races in Qatar, and the UAE, due to an escalating regional war, Domenicali clarified that Formula One, and ticket sales, are bigger than the "problem" in the region. "For us today, the races in Qatar and Abu Dhabi are confirmed," Domenicali said. "By the way, they are already sold out. That is an incredible sign of how much the sport is bigger than the problem that our world is living."
