= 2019 West London celebrity burglaries =

Series of crimes in London, England

In December 2019, a team of burglars raided the West London homes of footballer Frank Lampard and his television presenter wife Christine, former Leicester City FC owner Vichai Srivaddhanaprabha, and heiress Tamara Ecclestone. It is believed to be the biggest of its kind in English legal history. The targets were chosen for their celebrity status.

In July 2022, following the release of a BBC documentary about the raids, Tamara Ecclestone offered a £6 million reward for information leading to the return of jewellery stolen in the raid.
