= Petra Ecclestone =

English heiress, model, fashion designer and socialite

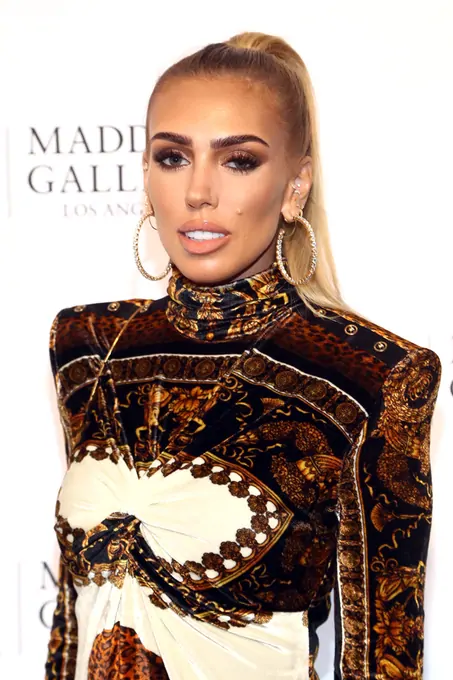
- Born: 17 December 1988 (age 37); London, England
- Occupations: Heiress; model; fashion designer; socialite
- Spouses: James Stunt (m. 2011; div. 2017) Sam Palmer (m. 2022)
- Children: 4
- Parents: Bernie Ecclestone; Slavica Radić
- Relatives: Tamara Ecclestone (sister)

Petra Ecclestone (born 17 December 1988) is an English heiress, model, fashion designer and socialite.

== Early life ==
Ecclestone was born in London, the younger daughter of former Armani model Croatian-born Slavica Radić and English Formula One billionaire Bernie Ecclestone. She has an older sister, Tamara Jane, an older paternal half-sister, Deborah, and a younger paternal half-brother, Alexander.

She attended Trevor-Roberts School, then Francis Holland School, and Benenden School.

She contracted viral meningitis at the age of 14, and told the media that it "changed her life forever". She said "I no longer take my health for granted ... I'm now a health freak and a hypochondriac. I'm obsessed with cleanliness, I eat healthily and take my vitamins." She has since become an ambassador for the Meningitis Trust.

== Fashion career ==
Growing up, she wanted to be a fashion designer. She decided to make menswear because it is a "bigger niche" and because "womenswear was too saturated".

At the age of 19, she created the menswear label FORM, which was sold into retailers including Harrods from October 2008. In April 2009, it was announced that Petra had signed a contract with the Croatian clothing manufacturer Siscia.

== Personal life ==
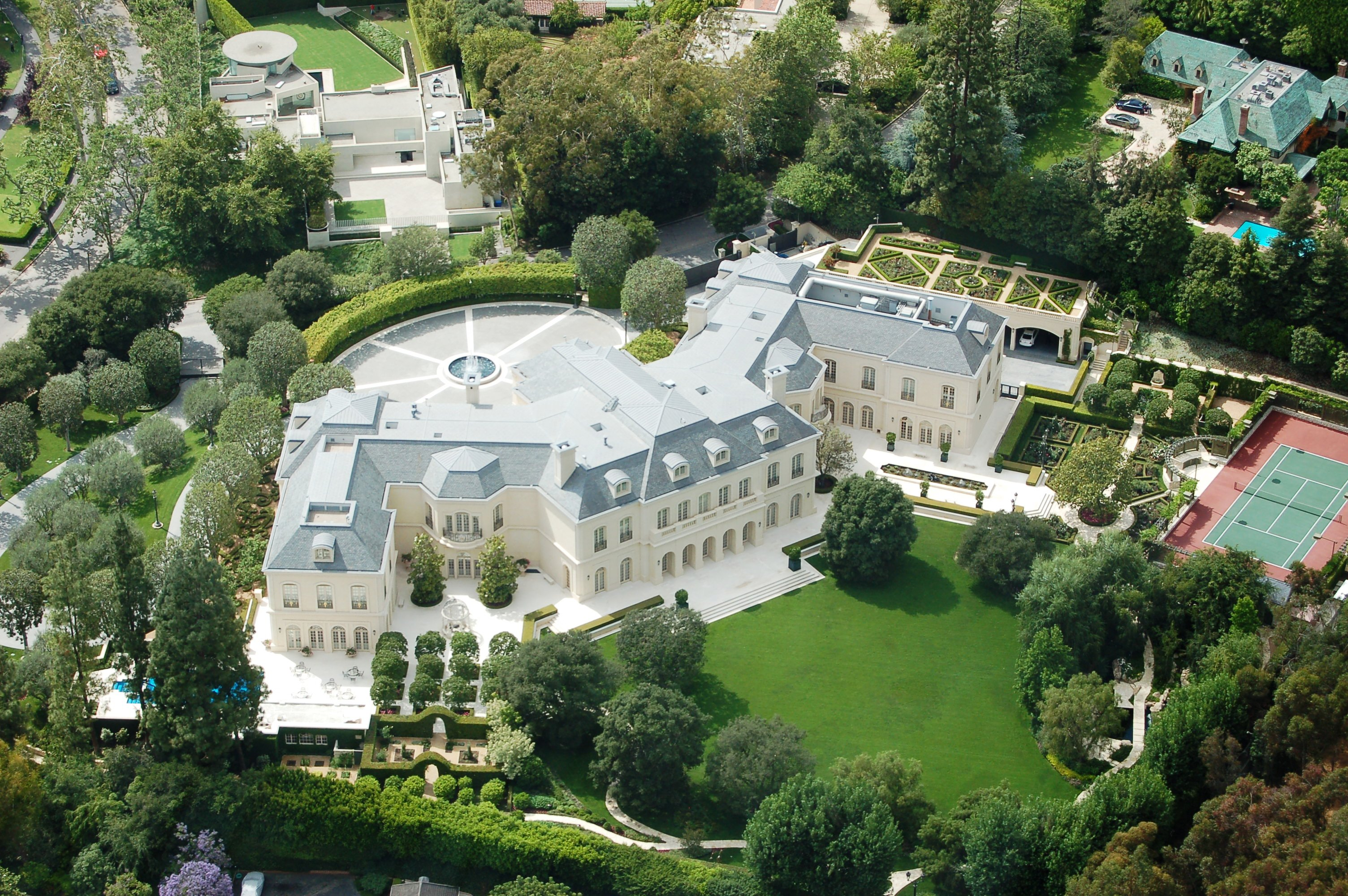
The Manor in Holmby Hills, Los Angeles, formerly owned by Ecclestone

As well as English, she speaks Croatian fluently and understands French and Italian.

On 27 August 2011, Ecclestone married businessman James Stunt. She gave birth to their first child, a daughter, in February 2013. In April 2015 she gave birth to twin boys. Their divorce was finalised on 12 October 2017, along with an agreed split of their estimated £5.5 billion joint wealth, and she reverted to her maiden name. In 2020 she gave birth to her second daughter. On 16 July 2022, Ecclestone married businessman Sam Palmer.

=== Residences ===
Her 57,000-square-foot (5,300 m^{2}) mansion, The Manor, was the former residence of Candy and Aaron Spelling, and was the largest house in Los Angeles County. According to a 2012 article in The Wall Street Journal, she had first viewed several other properties, including a 36,000-square-foot property on Sunset Boulevard, priced at $49.5 million. The real estate broker Rick Hilton said: "I showed her several properties but they weren't grand enough." In 2014, Ecclestone put The Manor back on the market with a price tag of $150 million. However, she reportedly turned down an offer that met her price in December 2015. The Manor was relisted for sale in October 2016 with an asking price of $200 million. In June 2019, it sold to an anonymous buyer for $119.7 million, the highest sale price in California history.

In 2010 she acquired Sloane House on Old Church Street in Chelsea, London. Ecclestone spent several years renovating the property with a substantial basement. In 2019 she offered the house for sale for £150 million and "at least" £175 million in 2021. The house was the subject of a feature in Architectural Digest in 2021.

In January 2026, the New York Post reported that Ecclestone had purchased a '$70 million home in the Emirates Hills'. The Villa sits on a 27,000 square foot plot facing the golf course. Ecclestone's husband confirmed the purchase describing Emirates Hills as "the most luxurious community in Dubai."

== See also ==
- List of largest houses in the Los Angeles metropolitan area
- List of largest houses in the United States
