= Randy Spelling =

American former actor (born 1978)

- Born: Randall Gene Spelling; October 9, 1978 (age 46); Los Angeles, California, U.S.
- Occupation(s): Actor, life coach
- Years active: 1995–2008 (acting); 2009–present (life coach)
- Spouse: Leah Stutz (m. 2010)
- Children: 2
- Parent(s): Aaron Spelling; Candy Spelling
- Relatives: Tori Spelling (sister)
- Website: www.randyspelling.com

Randall Gene Spelling (born October 9, 1978) is an American former actor and life coach. He is the brother of Tori Spelling and the son of Candy and Aaron Spelling.

== Early life ==
Spelling was born in Los Angeles. He has an older sister, actress and reality television personality Tori Spelling. He attended Montclair College Prep.

== Career ==
In 1995, when Spelling was 17 years old, he played the role of Flipper Gage in the teen-oriented drama Malibu Shores, which was produced by his father. Spelling said he took the role because the characterization was completely different from himself.

He also carried out a guest role on the popular series Beverly Hills, 90210 alongside his sister Tori Spelling.

Spelling was later cast as Sean Richards in Sunset Beach, again produced by his father.

In 2007, Spelling took part in his own reality television series, Sons of Hollywood, which aired on the A&E Network. He starred alongside Sean Stewart and David Weintraub.

As of 2009, he works as a life coach between Portland, Oregon and West Los Angeles.

== Personal life ==
Spelling married Leah Stutz (now Leah Spelling) on September 25, 2010. The couple have two daughters.

== Filmography ==
=== Starring roles ===
- Malibu Shores (1996) as 'Flipper' Gage
- Sunset Beach (1997–99) as Sean Richards
- Sons of Hollywood (2007) as Himself

=== Selected guest-starring roles ===
- Beverly Hills, 90210 as Ryan Sanders/Kenny (1992–2000: 14 episodes)
- 7th Heaven as Alex Mandelbaum (2004: one episode)

=== Movie/mini-series/special roles ===
- Held for Ransom (2000) as Dexter
- National Lampoon Presents Dorm Daze (2003) as Foosball
- Hoboken Hollow (2005) as Parker Hilton
- Hot Tamale (2006) as Harland Woodriff
- National Lampoon's Pledge This! (2006) as Kelly
- Cosmic Radio (2007) as Marty
- Dimples (2008) as Billy
