= Formula One Group =

Motorsports company

- Formerly: Formula One Constructors Association
- Type: Subsidiary
- Traded as: Nasdaq: FWONA (Series A); OTCQB: FWONB (Series B); Nasdaq: FWONK (Series C); FWB: LM0D (Series A); FWB: LM0F (Series C); Russell 1000 components (FWONA, FWONK)
- ISIN: US5312298707; US5312298541; US5312297717; US5312297550
- Industry: Motorsport
- Founder: Bernie Ecclestone
- Headquarters: 2 St. James's Market, London, U.K.
- Area served: Globally
- Key people: Stefano Domenicali (President and CEO); Chase Carey (Non-executive Chairman)
- Brands: Formula 1 Formula One Paddock Club
- Owner: Liberty Media
- Subsidiaries: MotoGP Sports Entertainment Group (84%); Formula One World Championship Limited; Formula One Promotions and Administration; Formula One Management (FOM)

The Formula One Group is a group of companies responsible for the promotion of the FIA's Formula One World Championship, and the exercising of the sport's commercial rights.

The Group was previously owned by Delta Topco, a Jersey-based company owned primarily by investment companies CVC Capital Partners, Waddell & Reed, and LBI Group, with the remaining ownership split between Bernie Ecclestone, other investment companies, and company directors. It was bought by Liberty Media in 2017.

Ecclestone, a former Formula One team boss, spent 40 years as chief executive of the company after gaining control of the commercial rights. As of 2025, the group is run by Stefano Domenicali as president and chief executive officer. Chase Carey, who previously ran the group from 2017 to 2020, is non-executive chairman.

== History ==
In 1974, the Formula One Constructors' Association (FOCA) was founded in order to increase commercial organisation of Formula One for the benefit of the racing teams. In 1978, Bernie Ecclestone became the executive of FOCA, and fought the Fédération Internationale du Sport Automobile (FISA) for control of the commercial rights of F1. Disputes were settled by March 1981 when the Concorde Agreement gave FOCA the right to negotiate TV contracts. Under previous arrangements, TV contracts were risky and not very lucrative.

When the second Concorde Agreement was agreed in 1987, Ecclestone ceased being a team owner and established Formula One Promotions and Administration (FOPA) to manage TV rights for the teams. FOPA would later become known as Formula One Management (FOM). FOPA received 49% of TV revenues: 1% went to the teams, and 50% to the FIA. FOPA also received all the fees paid by promoters and paid prize money to the teams. The third Concorde Agreement was signed in 1992.

When the fourth Concorde Agreement was signed in 1995, the FIA decided to grant the commercial rights of F1 to Formula One Administration (managed by FOM) for a 14-year period. In exchange, Ecclestone would provide an annual payment. With FOM having exclusive rights to popular team names like McLaren, Williams, and Tyrrell, the aforementioned teams protested by rejecting the following Concorde Agreement in 1997. A compromise was reached and a new Concorde Agreement was signed by all teams in 1998.

McLaren, Williams, Ferrari and Renault formed GPWC Holdings, and threatened to form a rival racing franchise in 2008 when their contracts ended in 2007.

=== Ecclestone sells shares of F1 ===
SLEC Holdings was created as the holding company of the Formula One companies in 1996 when Ecclestone transferred his ownership of Formula One businesses to his wife, Slavica, in preparation for a 1997 flotation of the group.

In June 1999, the European Commission announced it would investigate the FIA, Formula One Administration (FOA) and International Sportsworld Communicators for abusing dominant position and restricting competition. ISC, owned by Ecclestone, had signed a 14-year agreement with the FIA in 1996 for the exclusive broadcasting rights for 18 FIA championships.

In October 1999, Morgan Grenfell Private Equity (MGPE) acquired 12.5% of SLEC for £234 million. In February 2000, Hellman and Friedman purchased a 37.5% share of SLEC for £625 million, and combined its share with that of MGPE to form Speed Investments, which had a combined holding of 50% of SLEC. On 22 March 2000, German media company EM.TV & Merchandising purchased Speed Investments for £1.1 billion.

EM.TV's acquisitions caused it financial difficulties; following its announcement that its 2000 earnings would be below expectations and it was struggling with its debts, the share price dropped 90%. In February, the Kirch Group agreed to rescue EM.TV in return for a stake in the company and control of Speed Investments. Alan Henry of The Guardian reported that the two companies also agreed to exercise EM.TV's option to purchase another 25% of SLEC for approximately £600 million in late-March 2001. To raise Speed Investments' share of SLEC to 75% Kirch borrowed €1.6 billion, €1 billion from Bayerische Landesbank (BayernLB) and the rest from Lehman Brothers and JPMorgan Chase. Kirch's involvement raised concerns among the major automobile manufacturers who participate in Formula One; BMW, DaimlerChrysler, Fiat, Ford, and Renault formed GPWC Holding BV to secure better representation of the manufacturers in F1, improved financial conditions for the teams, stability for the championship, and maintenance of free-to-air television coverage.

Due to the agreement associated with their shareholding, SLEC was controlled by Kirch, who controlled the board of Formula One Holdings (FOH). Due to huge losses and massive expenditure, Kirch's creditors put the company into receivership in 2002. These banks dismantled the group. Kirch's share of SLEC was retained by BayernLB, JPMorgan Chase and Lehman Brothers (through Speed Investments).

Before they could exercise their rights as shareholders, they had to seek clearance from the European Commission. In the intervening period, Ecclestone instituted changes in the boards of SLEC, FOH, FOA and Formula One Management (FOM); which in effect put Bambino Holdings in control of those companies.

In mid-November 2004, the three banks sued Ecclestone for more control over the sport, prompting speculation that Ecclestone might altogether lose the control he has maintained for then more than thirty years. A two-day court hearing began on 23 November, but after the proceedings had ended the following day, Justice Andrew Park announced his intention to reserve ruling for several weeks. On 6 December 2004, Park read his verdict, stating that "In [his] judgment it is clear that Speed's contentions are correct and [he] should therefore make the declarations which it requests". However, Ecclestone insisted that the verdict - seen almost universally as a legal blow to his control of Formula One - would mean "nothing at all". He stated his intention to appeal the decision.

The following day, at a meeting of team bosses at Heathrow Airport, Ecclestone offered the teams a total of £260 million over three years in return for unanimous renewal of the Concorde Agreement, which was due to expire in 2008. Weeks later, Gerhard Gribkowsky, a board member of BayernLB, and the chairman of SLEC, stated that the banks had no intention to remove Ecclestone from his position of control.

=== CVC acquisition ===
In November 2005, CVC Capital Partners announced it was to acquire the 25% and 48% shares of Bambino and BayernLB in SLEC, and acquired the shares of JPMorgan Chase in December 2005. This deal was given approval by the European Commission on 21 March 2006 and finalised on 28 March. Ecclestone used the proceeds of the sale of Bambino Holdings' share to reinvest in the company to give the Ecclestone family a 13.8% stake in the holding company Alpha Prema. On 30 March 2006, CVC purchased the 14.1% share of SLEC held by Lehman Brothers to give CVC a majority ownership in the Formula One Group with 63.4%, with other shareholdings owned by LBI Group, JP Morgan, and company directors. The deputy team principal of Force India, Bob Fernley, accused CVC of "raping the sport" during the period of its involvement in Formula One.

The Formula One Group planned an initial public offering on the Singapore Stock Exchange in June 2012, valuing the company at $10 billion. Up to 30% of the company would be listed, with most of the stock coming from the shareholding owned by the creditors of the bankrupt Lehman Brothers. However, the flotation was delayed until October 2012, with Ecclestone citing volatile markets and problems in the Eurozone. CVC sold part of its stake in the company to three investment companies: Waddell & Reed, BlackRock and Norges Bank; reducing its holding to 35.5%, and making Waddell & Reed the second-biggest shareholder. The planned flotation was kept on hold throughout 2012, until it was revived in April 2013 when Ecclestone announced it would take place within the year.

=== Liberty acquisition ===
In late 2016, Liberty Media agreed to buy controlling interest in the Formula One Group for $4.4 billion (£3.3 billion). The deal was approved by regulators and completed on 23 January 2017. Chase Carey subsequently became chief executive of the Group and Ross Brawn was appointed to the newly created role of managing director, Motor Sports and technical director. In September 2020, it was announced that former Ferrari team boss Stefano Domenicali would become the new chief executive of the Formula One Group. On 28 November 2022, Brawn confirmed he was retiring from F1.

The Formula One Group is listed in the Nasdaq as a tracking stock under the ticker FWONA and FWONK.

Liberty Media acquired the majority of Dorna Sports and with it, the commercial rights of MotoGP and Superbike World Championship in 2025 and placed it into the Formula One Group.

== Group companies ==
The Formula One Group was controlled by its shareholders through the Delta Topco holding company, which through a number of holding companies registered in the United Kingdom, Jersey and Luxembourg controls the SLEC Holdings company, the Formula One Group's immediate owner. The Formula One Group comprises several subsidiary companies which control the various rights, management, and licensing operations of the Formula One World Championship.

The commercial rights of Formula One are controlled by Formula One World Championship Limited (FOWC), which received the rights to Formula One for a period of 100 years from the FIA. Formula One World Championship's control of the rights began from the beginning of 2011, where it took over from sister company Formula One Administration (FOA), which controlled the rights for a 14-year period beginning in 1996. FOWC, as the commercial rights holder, negotiates the contracts for holding F1 Grands Prix, organising television contracts with broadcasters, and receiving licensing fees for use of Formula One material. The company also has a seat on the FIA World Motor Sport Council, the body responsible for regulating international motorsport. Formula One Licensing BV is a related Dutch registered company of the Formula One Group which claims ownership of the trademarks of Formula One; the F1 logo, "Formula 1", "Formula One", "F1" and the intro design shown before the broadcast of Grands Prix.

Formula One Management (FOM) is the main operating company of the group, and controls the broadcasting, organisation and promotional rights of Formula One. The company produces the televised feeds of all Grand Prix sessions, which are then supplied through the Eurovision satellites network (EBU) to broadcasters who provide commentary and distribute the feed in the authorised region(s) of said broadcasters. The production arm of FOM is based at Biggin Hill Airport, London, for easy travel of the equipment needed to broadcast the race. Financially, FOM provides partial investment for new tracks and teams, to allow them to establish themselves in the sport and grow Formula One's presence in new markets. The season calendar for the championship is structured by FOM, with the WMSC having oversight. Payments to the teams are determined by the Concorde Agreement, which gives the teams 50% of the television money in Constructors' Championship order, and awards a prize fund to teams based upon their results, which is drawn from the fees Grand Prix promoters pay for staging the race. The logistics of moving equipment and personnel from each race is also handled by FOM, which provides the teams with a set amount of transport for the races outside of Europe.

The Formula One Group is also used to refer to several related companies, which although not part of the Group, are controlled by the Delta Topco holding company, and have business related to Formula One.

=== Allsport Management ===
Allsport Management S.A. is a Swiss registered company based in Geneva, which manages the sale of almost all Formula One trackside advertising, and the Formula One Paddock Club. Allsport Management was founded by Paddy McNally, who had begun to work with Bernie Ecclestone in the late 1970s. McNally, who was a former Marlboro sponsorship consultant, came up with a solution to "tidy up" trackside advertising; this solution was called "themed advertising", where one advertiser is given total exposure at one part of the track. This is in contrast to the Monaco Grand Prix, the only grand prix where Allsport is not involved; where space is sold such that multiple advertisers are visible in every picture. The Paddock Club is Formula One's corporate hospitality organisation, which provides a luxury area for VIP's and sponsors for the Grand Prix weekend, and also gives access to teams and drivers and tours of the pits. In 2006, Allsport Management (and the related Allsopp Parker & Marsh companies) were acquired by CVC through Delta Topco, meaning that the sport's complete revenues are controlled by the Formula One Group. After the acquisition, Ecclestone stated "APM and Allsport Management have been developed into highly successful businesses over the last 25 years and we are delighted that each of them will now form part of the Formula One Group".

=== Formula Motorsport Limited ===
Formula Motorsport Limited (formerly GP2 Motorsport Limited) was acquired by CVC in 2007, with its ownership controlled by Formula One's holding companies. FML currently runs various Formula One feeder series, which usually run races at the European rounds of the F1 championship, in order to give drivers experience and exposure to Formula One teams.

Series currently run by FML are:

Series Name	Description	Year founded
FIA Formula 2 Championship	A second-tier single-seater championship supporting Formula One at specific races across the F1 season - succeeding the former GP2 Series	2017
FIA Formula 3 Championship	A third-tier single-seater championship supporting Formula One at specific races across the F1 season - succeeding the former GP3 Series	2019
F1 Academy	An all-female single-seater championship supporting Formula One at specific races across the F1 season	2023

Dormant series previously run by FML are:

Series Name	Description	Year founded	Year Finished
GP2 Series	A second-tier single-seater championship supporting Formula One at specific races across the F1 season	2005	2016
GP2 Asia Series	A second-tier single-seater championship supporting Formula One at specific Asian-based races across the F1 season	2008	2011
GP3 Series	A third-tier single-seater championship supporting Formula One at specific races across the F1 season	2010	2018

The Formula One Group also owns the rights to the "GP1" name.

=== MotoGP Sports Entertainment Group ===
MotoGP Sports Entertainment Group (also known as MotoGP SEG) is a motorsport promotion company based in Madrid, Spain, the company is responsible for promoting MotoGP and Superbike World Championship. The company was acquired by Liberty Media in 2025.

== List of President and CEO Formula One Group ==
- Bernie Ecclestone (1987–2017)
- Chase Carey (2017–2021)
- Stefano Domenicali (2021–present)
