= Forbidden Island (TV series) =

1999 American television series

Forbidden Island is a 1999 American TV series.

It was filmed in New Zealand. It was described as Lord of the Flies meets The X-Files.

== Plot ==
Strangers have crashed on an island with supernatural powers.
