= Slavica Ecclestone =

Croatian model and ex-wife of Bernie Ecclestone

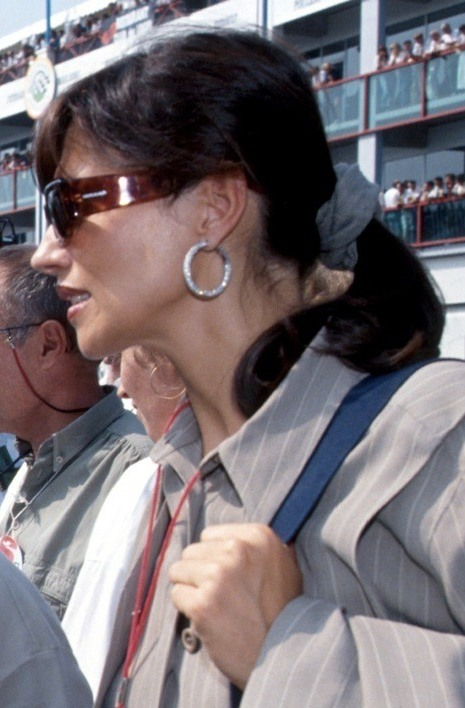
- Ecclestone in 1991
- Born: Slavica Radić; 2 June 1958 (age 68); Rijeka, PR Croatia, Yugoslavia
- Height: 185 cm (6 ft 1 in)
- Spouse: Bernie Ecclestone (m. 1985; div. 2009)
- Children: Tamara; Petra

Slavica Ecclestone (née Radić; born 2 June 1958) is a Serbian former model and the ex-wife of former Formula 1 CEO Bernie Ecclestone.

== Early life ==
Ecclestone was born in Rijeka, Croatia, to an ethnically Serb family where her parents–Jovan "Jovo" Radić and Ljubica Malić from Maglajani and Riječani, respectively, both villages within the Laktaši municipality, PR Bosnia and Herzegovina—had settled shortly before her birth in search of job opportunities. The family soon moved back to northern Bosnia to her father's native Maglajani where Ecclestone spent most of her childhood.

== Career ==
In her early career, Ecclestone worked as a fashion model, modelling for a number of clients, including the designer Armani. While working on a Formula One promotional event for Armani at the 1982 Italian Grand Prix in Monza, the twenty-four-year-old model met fifty-two-year-old Formula One chief Bernie Ecclestone.

== Personal life ==
From her marriage, Ecclestone has two daughters, Tamara (born 1984) and Petra (born 1988).

In November 2008, Ecclestone filed for divorce after 23 years of marriage. The divorce was granted on 11 March 2009. She ranked 194 in The Sunday Times' Rich List after she was awarded an estimated £740 million from her divorce.

In December 2019, she put her Chelsea mansion up for sale for more than £100 million after daughter Tamara's home in Kensington Palace Gardens was raided and jewels worth £50 million were stolen.
