= Chase Carey =

Irish-American executive (born 1953)

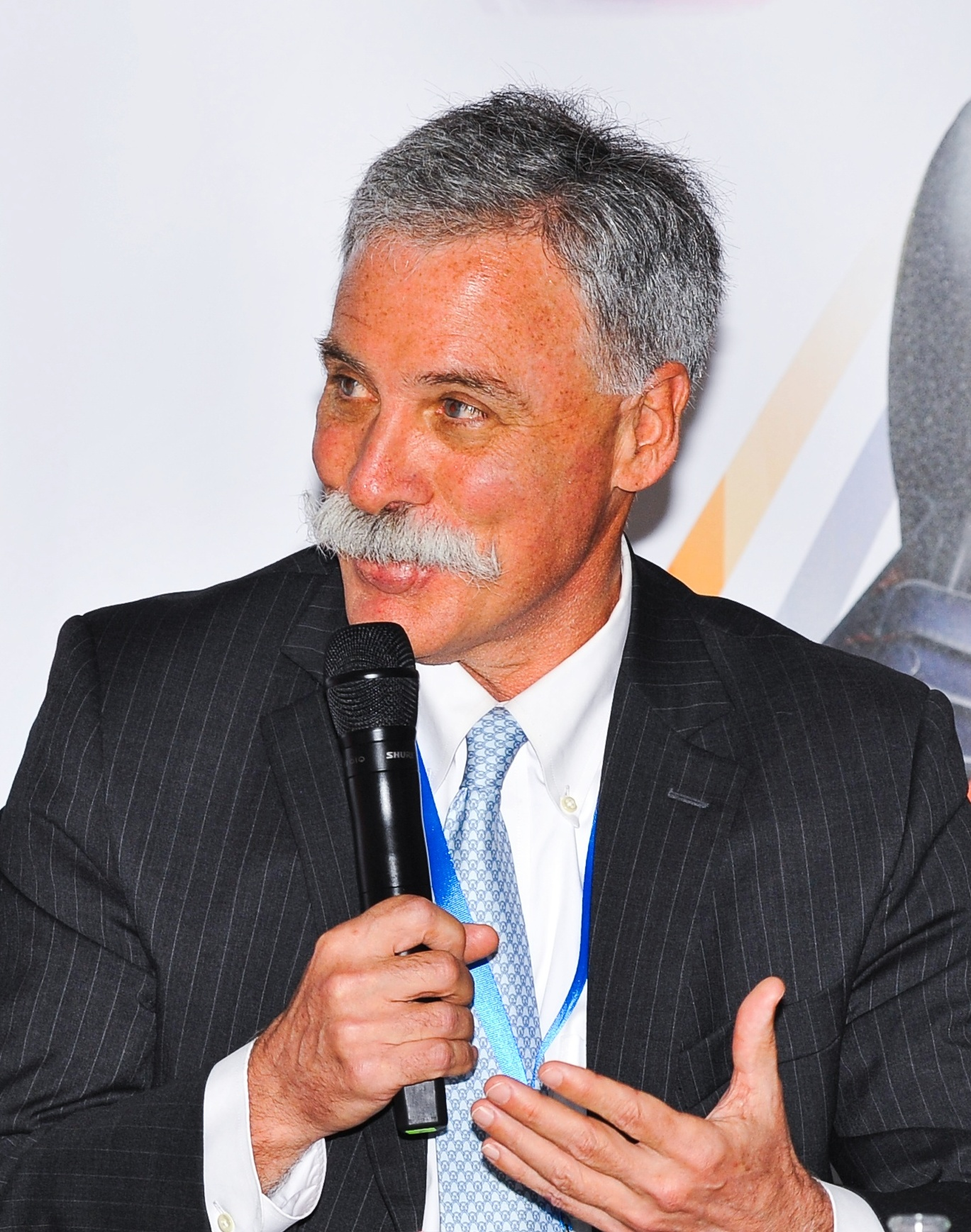
- Carey in 2018
- Born: Charles Gordon Carey; 22 November 1953 (age 72); Dublin, Ireland
- Education: Colgate University; Harvard University
- Board member of: Fox Corporation; Liberty Media
- Children: 2

Charles Gordon "Chase" Carey (born 22 November 1953) is an Irish-born American executive who is a board member of Fox Corporation and Liberty Media. He is the former chief executive officer and executive chairman of the Formula One Group. He has previously worked for News Corp, DirecTV, 21st Century Fox and Sky plc.

== Early life ==
Carey was born in Ireland to American parents of Irish descent, and received his bachelor's degree from Colgate University and an MBA from Harvard, where he was a member of the Harvard Business School Rugby Club. While attending Colgate he joined the Delta Upsilon fraternity and was a member of the Colgate University Rugby Football Club. Today, Carey is a Trustee Emeritus of Colgate University.

== Career ==
=== Early career with Fox ===
Carey first came to work with Fox, a News Corporation holding, in 1988. Over the course of the following decade he served as COO of Fox, Inc., and CEO of Fox Broadcasting Company. During this time he helped launch both Fox Sports and Fox News and helped form a partnership between Fox Network and the NFL, a deal worth $1.58 billion.

He also served as co-COO of News Corporation, along with Peter Chernin. He resigned as co-COO of News Corp on January 24, 2002.

=== DirecTV ===
During the time that Carey was working for News Corp, the company purchased a 34% controlling interest in Hughes Electronics, which at the time owned DirecTV, a satellite TV provider. Carey had already served on the DirecTV board of directors, and in 2003 he was appointed CEO.

At DirecTV, Carey had plans to add 1 million new subscribers a year, and had met that goal when he left the company six years later. Carey's tenure at DirecTV was widely considered successful, and the company returned to profitability.

In 2006, News Corporation sold its controlling interest in DirecTV to Liberty Media, in exchange for News Corp shares.

=== Return to News Corporation ===
In June 2009, it was announced that Carey would be leaving DirecTV and returning to News Corp. He assumed the posts of President and COO that had been held by Chernin, as well as the post of Deputy Chairman.

In August 2011 Rupert Murdoch tipped Carey to be his successor as CEO of News Corporation. It was previously assumed that Murdoch's son James would succeed him. In 2013, Carey was announced as the COO of 21st Century Fox, the legal successor of News Corporation and the owner of most of its film and television properties, News Corporation's print media and Australian assets being spun off as News Corp. In 2015, Carey was reassigned as executive co-chairman, while James Murdoch became CEO. Carey resigned this position in July 2016 to become a consultant to Fox.

In 2019, he was on the Fox Corporation board.

=== Formula One and Liberty ===
On 23 January 2017, Carey was installed as CEO and Executive chairman of Formula One Group after Liberty Media completed their acquisition of the Formula One Group.

On September 25, 2020, Liberty Media announced that Carey would take on the role of non-executive chairman, with Stefano Domenicali stepping in as CEO as of January 2021. Carey’s achievements included the establishment of a cost cap for the first time in Formula 1 and the signing of a more equitable Concorde Agreement with the teams from 2021 to 2025.

Carey joined the board of directors of Liberty Media in January 2025.

== Personal life ==
Carey is married to Wendy and has a son and a daughter. In 2022, the family donated $23 million to build a new sports complex for the Colgate Raiders.
