= Grand Prix World Championship =

Proposed auto racing championship

The Grand Prix World Championship (GPWC) refers to a number of proposed alternative world championship auto racing series to rival or replace Formula One. Founded in 2001, the GPWC was created as a tool to assist the companies in bargaining with Bernie Ecclestone for an agreeable extension to the 1997 Concorde Agreement, the contract by whose terms the teams compete in Formula One.

== Background ==
In 1979, the Commission Sportive Internationale, an organization subordinate to the FIA which was at that time the rule-making body for Formula One, was dissolved and replaced by the Fédération Internationale du Sport Automobile, or FISA, which would serve the same function. FISA clashed repeatedly with the Formula One Constructors Association (FOCA), which represented the teams' interests. FOCA's chief executive at the time was Bernie Ecclestone and his legal advisor was Max Mosley, while the president of FISA was Jean Marie Balestre.

The two organizations' disagreements, which came to be known as the FISA–FOCA war, resulted in several races being cancelled. Goodyear threatened to withdraw entirely from Formula One, an event which would have been commercially disastrous for the sport, so Ecclestone organized a meeting of team managers, Balestre, and other FISA representatives at the offices of the FIA in the Place de la Concorde, Paris, France. On 19 January 1981, after thirteen straight hours of negotiation, all parties present signed the first Concorde Agreement, named after the plaza in Paris where the discussions took place. The Concorde Agreement is a contract with the Fédération Internationale de l'Automobile, Formula One teams and Formula One Administration that dictates the terms by which the teams compete in races and take their share of the television revenues and prize money. In 1995, the FIA granted commercial rights of Formula One to FOA for a period of 14 years in exchange for an annual payment from Ecclestone. Formula One subsequently signed another extension of the Concorde Agreement in 1987, 1992 and 1997. However, McLaren, Tyrrell, and Williams did not sign the agreement in 1997 citing Ecclestone for not allowing more commercial opportunities to be made available. A subsequent amendment led to the three teams signing the agreement in 1998.

== Formation ==
GPWC Holdings was founded in November 2001 by car manufacturers BMW, DaimlerChrysler, Fiat, Ford and Renault. The initial directors of the company were Burkhard Goeschel (BMW), Juergen Hubbert (DaimlerChrysler), Paolo Cantarella (Fiat), Wolfgang Reitzle (Ford) and Patrick Faure (Renault). The company was registered in the Netherlands and Cantarella served as the chairman of the GPWC. The car manufacturers were all originally committed to remain Formula One motor racing for the long-term. Formula One team principals (excluding Arrows team principal Tom Walkinshaw) were introduced to the GPWC in a presentation held in Geneva on 27 November 2001. GPWC contacted German media group Kirch Media, saying that if the media outlet was unable to increase the share of Formula One commercial rights payable to existing teams, GPWC would form their own independent rival racing series in 2008. The car manufacturers proposed a $50 million one-off advance to Ferrari in an effort to join the GPWC with an additional bonus of 4% from commercial revenue. Kirch Bankers offered the car manufacturers a 30% stake in their business with the condition that plans for the rival series were dropped.

A reorganisation occurred in June 2002 when Cantarella resigned and was succeeded by the head of the car division of DaimlerChrysler Juergen Hubbert. The president of Ferrari Luca di Montezemolo would represent Fiat with Group Vice President-Global Product Development of Ford Richard Parry-Jones taking over from Reitzle's position after leaving in May 2002.

The future of the GPWC was cast into doubt in mid-January 2005 when Ferrari, FIAT's F1 team, announced it had secretly come to terms with Ecclestone and signed an extension to the Concorde Agreement for a one-off payment amounting to 100 million dollars (US). Ecclestone expressed his expectation that the remaining teams would shortly follow suit despite the initial 40 million dollar (US) offer being retracted. However, at around the same time Honda and Toyota showed interest in working together with GPWC.

== Proposed 2010 breakaway series ==
Following the FIA's announcement of unilateral rule changes for the 2010 season including voluntary budget limits, the FOTA teams had threatened to pull out of Formula One. On 18 June 2009, FOTA confirmed that they were to form a breakaway series starting in 2010. The teams were quoted saying "We've no alternative than to commence preparation for a new championship," following their four-hour-long meeting. The FIA responded to the teams' move in a statement, saying: "We are disappointed but not surprised by FOTA's inability to reach a compromise in the best interests of the sport."

On 23 June 2009, FOTA took the threat further by leaking a provisional calendar for a breakaway series in order to counter claims by the FIA that the teams lacked the sufficient funding to organize their own tournament. The schedule included 17 races made up of some circuits that were currently hosting a Grand Prix in the 2009 Season (such as Singapore), some circuits that had not held a Grand Prix in recent years (such as Jerez), and some that have never held a F1 Grand Prix. Some circuits were ones that have been controversially removed from F1 calendars by the FIA, including Montreal having been removed from the 2009 Season. However, on 24 June 2009, FOTA reached an agreement with the FIA to continue with F1. However, on 8 July, the FOTA group of teams were informed that they were not yet officially entered for the 2010 season. On 1 August, it was announced that the FIA had signed the new Concorde Agreement, bringing an end to the crisis and securing the sport's future until 2012.

== Leaked provisional 2010 calendar ==
Round	Grand Prix	Circuit	Date	Last Formula One date (if not a 2009 F1 venue)
1	Argentine Grand Prix	(Argentina) Autódromo Oscar Alfredo Gálvez, Buenos Aires	7 March	1998
2	Mexican Grand Prix	Autodromo Hermanos Rodriguez, Mexico City	21 March	1992
3	Spanish Grand Prix	(Spain) Circuito Permanente de Jerez, Jerez	11 April	1997
4	Portuguese Grand Prix	(Portugal) Algarve International Circuit, Portimão	25 April	Never
5	San Marino Grand Prix	(Italy) Autodromo Enzo e Dino Ferrari, Imola	2 May	2006
6	Monaco Grand Prix	Circuit de Monaco, Monte Carlo	23 May	2009 F1 venue
7	Canadian Grand Prix	(Canada) Circuit Gilles Villeneuve, Montreal	6 June	2008
8	United States Grand Prix	(United States) Indianapolis Motor Speedway, Indianapolis	13 June	2007
9	British Grand Prix	(United Kingdom) Silverstone Circuit, Silverstone	11 July	2009 F1 venue
10	French Grand Prix	(France) Circuit de Nevers Magny-Cours, Magny-Cours	25 July	2008
11	German Grand Prix	(Germany) EuroSpeedway Lausitz, Klettwitz	15 August	Never
12	Finnish Grand Prix	(Finland) Helsinki Thunder, Helsinki	29 August	Never
13	Italian Grand Prix	(Italy) Autodromo Nazionale Monza, Monza	12 September	2009 F1 venue
14	Abu Dhabi Grand Prix	(United Arab Emirates) Yas Marina Circuit, Abu Dhabi	26 September	2009 F1 venue
15	Singapore Grand Prix	Marina Bay Street Circuit, Singapore	10 October	2009 F1 venue
16	Japanese Grand Prix	(Japan) Suzuka Circuit, Suzuka	24 October	2009 F1 venue
17	Australian Grand Prix	(Australia) Adelaide Street Circuit, Adelaide/Surfers Paradise Street Circuit, Surfers Paradise	7 November	1995/Never

== See also ==
- A1GP
