= Max Mosley =

Race car driver and FIA President (1940–2021)

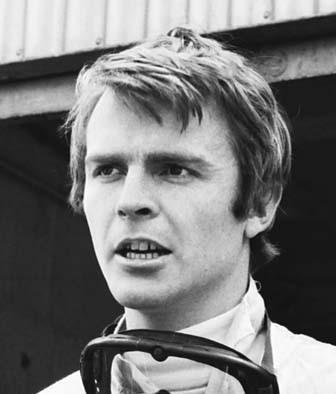
- Mosley in 1969

President of the Fédération Internationale de l'Automobile
- In office 23 October 1993 – 23 October 2009
- Preceded by: Jean-Marie Balestre
- Succeeded by: Jean Todt

President of the Fédération Internationale du Sport Automobile
- In office 1991–1993
- Preceded by: Jean-Marie Balestre
- Succeeded by: Position abolished

Personal details
- Born: Max Rufus Mosley; 13 April 1940 London, England
- Died: 23 May 2021 (aged 81) London, England
- Spouse: Jean Taylor (m. 1960)
- Children: 2
- Parents: Sir Oswald Mosley; Diana Mitford
- Relatives: Nicholas Mosley, 3rd Baron Ravensdale (paternal half-brother); Jonathan Guinness, 3rd Baron Moyne (maternal half-brother); Desmond Guinness (maternal half-brother); Alexander Mosley (brother)
- Education: Christ Church, Oxford

Max Rufus Mosley (13 April 1940 – 23 May 2021) was a British businessman, lawyer and racing driver. He served as president of the Fédération Internationale de l'Automobile (FIA), the governing body for Formula One.

A barrister and amateur racing driver, Mosley was a founder and co-owner of March Engineering, a racing car constructor and Formula One racing team. He dealt with legal and commercial matters for the company between 1969 and 1977 and became its representative at the Formula One Constructors' Association (FOCA), the body that represents Formula One constructors. Together with Bernie Ecclestone, Mosley represented FOCA at the FIA and in its dealings with race organisers. In 1978, he became the official legal adviser to FOCA. In this role, Mosley and Marco Piccinini negotiated the first version of the Concorde Agreement, which settled a long-standing dispute between FOCA and the Fédération Internationale du Sport Automobile (FISA), a commission of the FIA and the then governing body of Formula One. Mosley was elected president of FISA in 1991 and became president of the FIA, FISA's parent body, in 1993. Mosley identified his major achievement as FIA President as the promotion of the European New Car Assessment Programme (Euro NCAP or Encap). He also promoted increased safety and the use of green technologies in motor racing. In 2008, a story about his sex life appeared in a British newspaper, along with false allegations regarding Nazi connotations. Mosley successfully sued the newspaper that published the allegations and maintained his position as FIA president. He stood down at the end of his term in 2009 and was replaced by his preferred successor, Jean Todt.

Mosley was the youngest son of Sir Oswald Mosley, former leader of the British Union of Fascists, and Diana Mitford, member of the Mitford family. He was educated in France, Germany, and Britain before attending university at Christ Church, Oxford, where he graduated with a degree in physics. He then changed to law and was called to the bar in 1964. In his teens and early twenties, Mosley was involved with his father's post-war political party, the Union Movement (UM). He commented that the association of his surname with fascism stopped him from developing his interest in politics further, although he briefly worked for the Conservative Party in the early 1980s, and was a donor to the Labour Party from the New Labour era until 2018.

Mosley was the subject of Michael Shevloff's 2020 biographical documentary Mosley. He died at the age of 81 on 23 May 2021. An inquest confirmed his death as suicide following a diagnosis of terminal cancer.

== Family and early life ==
Max Mosley was born on 13 April 1940 in London, in the early years of the Second World War. His father was Sir Oswald Mosley, leader of the British Union of Fascists (BUF), and his mother was Diana Mitford, one of the Mitford sisters. In addition to his older full-brother Alexander, Mosley had five older half-siblings. On his father's side, they included the future novelist Nicholas Mosley, 3rd Baron Ravensdale (1923–2017). On his mother's side they were the merchant banker Jonathan Guinness, 3rd Baron Moyne (1930–2026), and the Irish preservationist Desmond Guinness (1931–2020). He was a nephew of Deborah Cavendish, Duchess of Devonshire, and first cousin of Peregrine Cavendish, 12th Duke of Devonshire. He was also third cousin of Winston Churchill MP, the grandson of the British prime minister, and fifth cousin of Queen Elizabeth The Queen Mother.

A month after Max Mosley's birth, his father, who had campaigned for a negotiated peace between the British Empire and Nazi Germany, was interned by the incoming Churchill government under Defence Regulation 18B, along with other active fascists in Britain. His mother was imprisoned a month later. Max and his brother Alexander were not included in their parents' internment and, as a result, were separated from them for the first few years of their lives. In December 1940, Winston Churchill asked the Home Secretary Herbert Morrison to ensure Lady Mosley was able to see Max regularly.

Sir Oswald and Lady Mosley were released from detention at HMP Holloway on 16 November 1943, provoking widespread public protests. Their children were refused entry to several schools, due to a combination of their wildness and their parents' reputation, and were initially tutored at home instead. The family moved to a succession of country houses in England. Mosley's older half-brother Nicholas described the family, including Sir Oswald's children from his first marriage, spending the summer of 1945 getting the harvest in and shooting at Crowood Farm, near Ramsbury, Wiltshire. At the age of 13, Mosley was sent to Stein an der Traun in Germany for two years, where he learned to speak fluent German. On his return to England, he spent a year at Millfield, an independent boarding school in Somerset, after which he continued his education in London for two years. He attended Christ Church, Oxford, graduating with a degree in physics in 1961. During his time there, he was secretary of the Oxford Union where his father spoke on two occasions, once with Jeremy Thorpe on the other side. In 1960, Mosley introduced his father to Robert Skidelsky, one of Mosley's contemporaries at the university, later a biographer of his father. Rejecting an early ambition to work as a physicist after "establishing that there was no money in it", Mosley studied law at Gray's Inn in London and qualified as a barrister in 1964. After a pupillage with Maurice Drake, he specialised in patent and trademark law. From 1961 to 1964, Mosley was a member of the Territorial Army, Parachute Regiment (44th Independent Parachute Brigade Group).

In 1950, the Mosleys bought houses in Ireland, and in Orsay, near Paris. They spent the year moving around Europe, spending the spring in France and the autumn and winter in Ireland, where Mosley was keen on riding and hunting. His aunt Nancy Mitford, in letters to Evelyn Waugh, recalled Sir Oswald and his family cruising the Mediterranean Sea on the family yacht. On one such trip they visited Spain and were entertained by Sir Oswald's friend General Franco.

Mosley, like many Formula One drivers, lived in Monaco. On 9 June 1960, he was married at the Chelsea Register Office to Jean Taylor, the daughter of James Taylor, a policeman from Streatham. In 1970, their first son, Alexander, was born, and in 1972 their second son, Patrick. On 5 May 2009, Alexander, a restaurateur, was found dead at his Notting Hill home by his cleaner. He had died of drug abuse at the age of 39. An inquest was held on 10 June 2009, the Westminster coroner declaring that his death was due to non-dependent drug abuse.

== Politics ==
From their teens to early twenties, Mosley and his brother were involved with their father's post-war party, the far-right Union Movement (UM), which advocated European nationalism. Trevor Grundy, a central figure in the UM's Youth Movement, writes of the 16-year-old Mosley painting the flash and circle symbol on walls in London on the night of the Soviet Union's invasion of Hungary (4 November 1956). The flash and circle was used by both the UM and the pre-war British Union of Fascists (BUF). He also says Mosley organised a couple of large parties as a way "to get in with lively, ordinary, normal young people, girls as well as boys, and attract them to the Movement by showing that we were like them and didn't go on about Hitler and Mussolini, Franco and British Fascism all the time". Mosley met his future wife Jean at such a party. Mosley and Alexander were photographed posing as Teddy Boys in Notting Hill during the 1958 race riots between Afro-Caribbeans and local white gangs. The following year, they canvassed for their father when he ran as a Union Movement candidate for the nearby Kensington North seat in the 1959 general election.

Mosley rarely discussed his early political involvement with his father. When his father Oswald died, the London Daily Mail described him as a "much maligned and much misunderstood political giant of his era". Certainly, his father's political presence affected his early years, but Mosley reflected on this time, "I was born into this rather strange family and then at a certain point you get away from that." While he distanced himself from this period of his life, the "misunderstanding has remained and today ... he carries that weight on his shoulders."

In a 1961 by-election, Mosley was an election agent for the Union Movement, supporting Walter Hesketh, the UM's parliamentary candidate for Manchester Moss Side. The motor racing journalist Alan Henry described him as one of his father's "right-hand men" at the time of a violent incident in 1962, in which Sir Oswald was knocked down by a mob in London and saved from serious injury by his son's intervention. As a result of his involvement in this fracas, Mosley was arrested and charged with threatening behaviour. He was later cleared at Old Street Magistrates' Court on the grounds that he was trying to protect his father. By 1964, when he began work as a barrister, Mosley was no longer involved in politics.

In the early 1980s, Mosley attempted a political career, working for the Conservative Party and hoping to become a parliamentary candidate. Bernie Ecclestone's biographer, Terry Lovell, wrote that he gave up this aspiration after being unimpressed by "the calibre of senior party officials". He also believed his name would be a handicap and later said, "If I had a completely open choice in my life, I would have chosen party politics, but because of my name, that's impossible". By the late 1990s, he had become a donor to the Labour Party and a supporter of the government of Tony Blair. In 2018, Labour decided not to accept further donations from Mosley following accusations that he published a leaflet in the 1960s linking immigrants with disease. Mosley had already donated £500,000 to the office of deputy leader Tom Watson.

== Racing career ==
While Mosley was at university, his wife was given tickets to a motor race at the Silverstone Circuit. The circuit is not far from Oxford, and the couple went out of curiosity. Mosley was attracted by the sport, and once qualified as a barrister, began teaching law in the evenings to earn enough money to start racing cars himself. The sport's indifference to his background appealed to Mosley:

There was always a certain amount of trouble [being the son of Sir Oswald] until I came into motor racing. And in one of the first races I ever took part in there was a list of people when they put the practice times [...] and I heard somebody say, 'Mosley, Max Mosley, he must be some relation of Alf Mos[e]ley, the coachbuilder.' And I thought to myself, 'I've found a world where they don't know about Oswald Mosley.' And it has always been a bit like that in motor racing: nobody gives a damn.

At national level in the UK, Mosley competed in over 40 races in 1966 and 1967; he won 12 and set several class lap records. In 1968, he formed the London Racing Team in partnership with driver Chris Lambert to compete in European Formula Two, which at that time was the level of racing just below Formula One. Their cars were prepared by Frank Williams, later a Formula One team owner. It was a dangerous time to race: Mosley's first Formula Two race was the 1968 Deutschland Trophäe at Hockenheim in which double world champion Jim Clark was killed, and within two years both of Mosley's 1968 teammates, Piers Courage and Chris Lambert, were dead in racing accidents. (Note: Both were killed in racing accidents at the Zandvoort track; Lambert died in 1968 and Piers Courage was killed in 1970.) Mosley's best result that year was an eighth place at a non-championship race at Monza. Engine builder Brian Hart says that as a driver, Mosley "might not have been particularly quick, but he was a thinking driver. He kept out of trouble and generally used his head."

== March Engineering ==
Everything we'd set out to do, we'd done, and there were two of our cars sitting on the front [...] you could feel the annoyance, the hatred almost, of some of the Grand Prix establishment because we'd pulled it off. It was one of the most extraordinary moments of my life.

— Mosley, recalling March's first F1 race, the 1970 South African Grand Prix

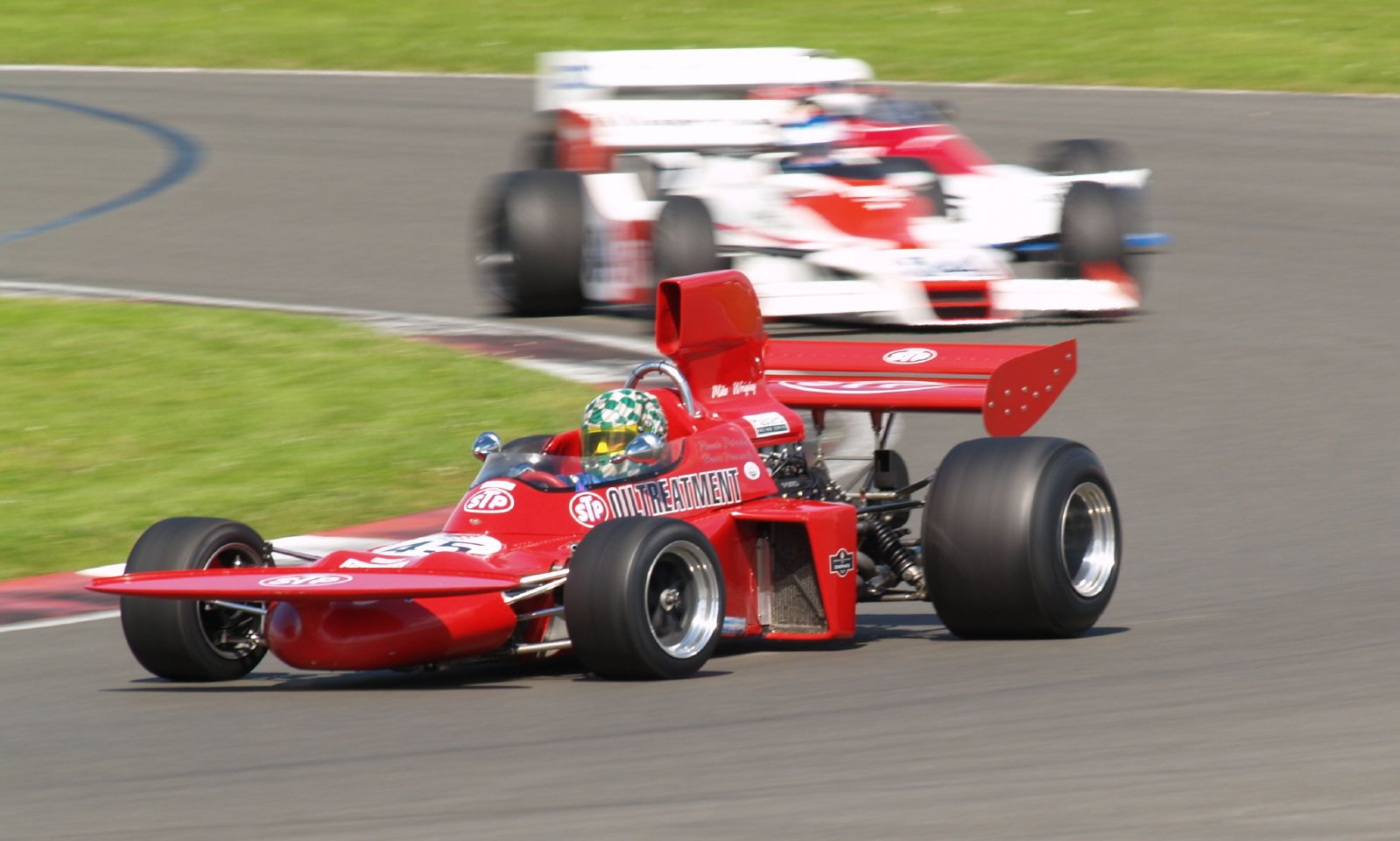
Mosley's legal skills were frequently called on at March Engineering: one example was a contract dispute with Frank Costin, designer of the novel aerodynamics of the March 711 seen here.

In 1969, after two large accidents due to breakages on his Lotus car, Mosley decided that "it was evident that I wasn't going to be World Champion" and retired from driving. He was already working with Robin Herd, Alan Rees, and Graham Coaker to establish the racing car manufacturer March Engineering where he handled legal and commercial matters. The name March is an acronym based on the initials of the founders; the 'M' stands for Mosley. Like the other founders, Mosley put in £2,500 of capital. His father told him that the company "would certainly go bankrupt, but it would be good training for something serious later on."

Mosley played a key role in publicising the new outfit. Although March had few resources and limited experience, the firm announced ambitious plans to enter Formula One, the pinnacle of single-seater racing, in 1970. The team had initially intended to enter a single car, but by the beginning of the season (partly due to deals made by Mosley), the number of March cars entered for their first Formula One race had risen to five. Two of these were run by March's own in-house works team and the rest by customer teams. Mosley also negotiated sponsorship from tyre maker Firestone and oil additive manufacturer STP.

The new operation was initially successful. In Formula One, March cars won three of their first four races. One of these was a world championship race, the 1970 Spanish Grand Prix, won by reigning world champion Jackie Stewart in a customer car run by Tyrrell Racing. As a result, March finished third in the 1970 Constructors' Championship. The factory also sold 40 cars to customers in various lower formulae. Despite these successes, the organisation got into financial difficulty almost immediately. The Formula One operation was costing more than the customer car business was making. The March works team's contract with its lead driver, Chris Amon, was expensive, and Mosley, in his own words, "tried at every opportunity to get rid of him". He reasoned that Stewart's highly competitive customer car was enough to show March in a good light. Amon stayed to the end of the year, but Mosley succeeded in "restructuring" his contract, saving the company some much-needed money. At the end of the season, Mosley successfully demanded full control of the finances, including the factory run by Coaker, who left shortly afterwards. Mosley and Herd borrowed £20,000 from relatives and friends to support the company into its second year. According to Lovell, the money came from Mosley's half-brother, Jonathan Guinness.

Tyrrell started making its own cars towards the end of 1970, and March's 1971 programme in Formula One was much reduced, with no recognised front-running driver. The Firestone and STP sponsorship was insufficient and Mosley failed to attract a large backer for 1971. Motorsport author Mike Lawrence has suggested that the shortfall forced him into short-term deals, which maintained cashflow, but were not in the best long-term interests of the company. Mosley negotiated a deal for the team to use Alfa Romeo engines in a third car, bringing much needed funding. The engines proved uncompetitive, and his hopes of an ongoing partnership with the Italian automobile manufacturer were not met. Nonetheless, March again finished third in the constructors championship, and works driver Ronnie Peterson, in a Cosworth DFV-powered car, was second in the Drivers' Championship. March's financial woes continued: the company had lost £71,000 at the end of 1971. Mosley and Rees disagreed over how to rectify the situation and Rees left March early in 1972.

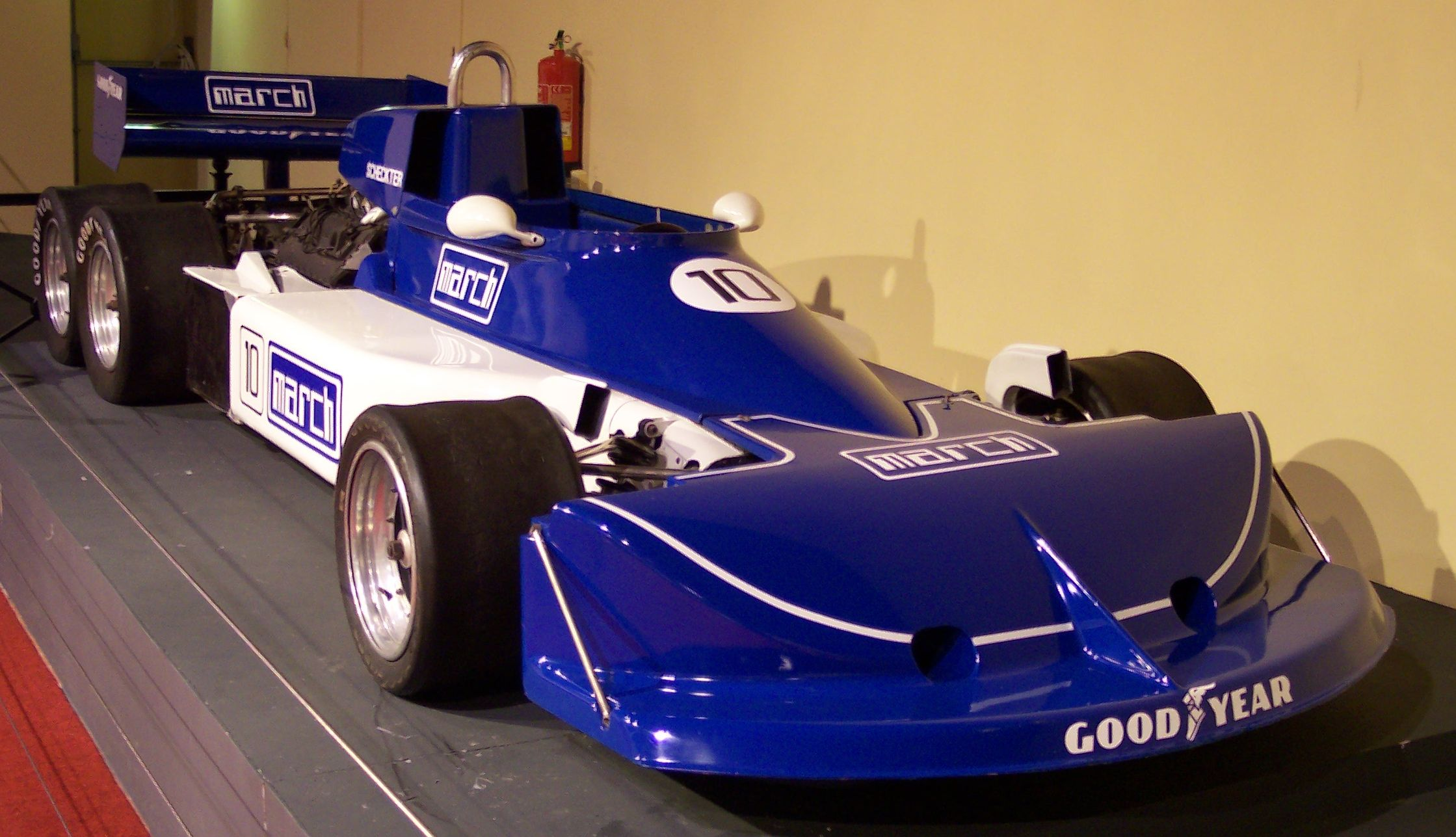
Mosley pushed for the unusual six-wheeled March 2-4-0 designed by Robin Herd to be built because of its significant aerodynamic and other advantages. The car never raced, however sales of models of the car are said to make it the most profitable car the company ever made.

March was more successful in selling large numbers of customer cars in the lower formulae. Mosley organised extensive test sessions for the 1971 cars for journalists and drivers, and arranged a successful scheme for drivers to rent cars and engines for the season, rather than buying them outright. Losing money on a deal to supply Jochen Neerpasch, then motorsport manager at Ford, with a Formula Two car paid off when Neerpasch moved to BMW and offered March an exclusive deal to use BMW's Formula Two engine for the 1973 season. March cars powered by BMW engines won five of the next 11 European Formula Two championships.

Although March considered quitting Formula One on several occasions, money was always found to support at least one car. Motorsport historian Mike Lawrence credits Mosley with pressing for a six-wheeled March to be built as a draw for sponsors, having seen the popularity with fans of Tyrrell's six-wheeled P34. The resulting March 2-4-0 never competed in Formula One, but generated the required publicity and a Scalextric slotcar model was profitable. Mosley spent much of his time negotiating deals for drivers with sponsorship and was also successful in selling Marches to other Formula One teams, such as Williams and Penske. The cars were rarely frontrunners, although the works team won a single race in both 1975 and 1976. By the end of 1977, Mosley was fed up with the struggle to compete in Formula One with no resources and left to work for FOCA full-time, selling his shares in the company to Herd but remaining as a director. March's involvement in Formula One ended the same year. (Note: March works teams returned to Formula One in 1981–1982 and 1987–1992 (as Leyton House Racing in 1990 and 1991).)

== Formula One Constructors' Association ==
From 1969, Mosley was invited to represent March at the Grand Prix Constructors' Association (GPCA), which negotiated joint deals on behalf of its member teams. Although the new March organisation was not popular with the established teams, Mosley has said that "when they went along to meetings to discuss things such as prize money, they felt they ought to take me along because I was a lawyer". He was unimpressed with the standard of negotiations: "our side all went in a group because no-one trusted anyone else and all were afraid that someone would break ranks and make a private deal." In 1971, British businessman Bernie Ecclestone bought the Brabham team, and Mosley recalled that:

Within about 20 minutes of [Ecclestone] turning up at the [GPCA] meeting, it was apparent that here was someone who knew how many beans made five and after about half an hour he moved round the table to sit next to me, and from then on he and I started operating as a team. Within a very short time, the two of us were doing everything for the GPCA, instead of everyone moving around in a block, and from that developed FOCA.

The Formula One Constructors' Association (FOCA) was created in 1974 by Ecclestone, Colin Chapman, Teddy Mayer, Mosley, Ken Tyrrell, and Frank Williams. FOCA would represent the commercial interests of the teams at meetings with the Commission Sportive Internationale (CSI) a commission of the FIA and motorsport's world governing body. The CSI later became the Fédération Internationale du Sport Automobile (FISA), motorsport's world governing body. After leaving March at the end of 1977, Mosley officially became legal advisor to FOCA, which was led by Ecclestone. In his biography of Ecclestone, Terry Lovell suggests that he appointed Mosley to this role not only because of his legal ability, but also because he "saw in Mosley the necessary diplomatic and political skills that made him perfectly suited to the establishment of the FIA". The Fédération Internationale de l'Automobile (FIA), founded in 1904 was FISA's parent body, representing road car users worldwide. In the same year, Mosley was nominated for a role at the FIA's Bureau Permanent International de Constructeurs d'Automobile (BPICA). His nomination was blocked by French, Italian, and German manufacturers.

In the early 1980s, Mosley represented FOCA in the "FISA–FOCA war", a conflict between FOCA, representing the mainly UK-based independent teams, and FISA, which was supported by the "grandee" constructors owned by road car manufacturers (primarily Alfa Romeo, Ferrari, and Renault). In 1980, FOCA announced its own World Federation of Motor Sport and ran the non-championship 1981 South African Grand Prix. The staging of this event, with worldwide television coverage, helped persuade Jean-Marie Balestre, the FISA president, that FISA would have to negotiate a settlement with FOCA. As Mosley later commented ... "We were absolutely skint. If Balestre could have held the manufacturer's support for a little bit longer, the constructors would have been on their knees. The outcome would then have been very different." Mosley helped draw up the Concorde Agreement, a document which resolved the dispute by essentially giving FISA control of the rules and FOCA control of commercial and television rights. The most recent version of the Concorde Agreement expired on 31 December 2007, and a new one was being discussed, as of 2008. In 1982, the year after the first Concorde Agreement was signed, Mosley left his role at FOCA, and Formula One, to work for the Conservative Party.

== FISA presidency ==
Mosley returned to motorsport in 1986, with the support of Ecclestone and Balestre, to become president of the FISA Manufacturers' Commission, the successor body to the BPICA with a seat on the FISA World Council. That same year, he established Simtek Research, a racing technical consultancy firm, with Nick Wirth, a former March employee. He sold his share of Simtek in 1991, when elected president of the FISA. According to Lovell, in 1987 Mosley suggested to Balestre that he could deal with his problems with Ecclestone by "mak[ing] him a member of the establishment". Later that year Ecclestone was appointed a vice-president of the FIA with responsibility for promotional affairs, with authority over Formula One and the other motor sports authorised by the FIA.

In 1991, Mosley challenged Balestre for the presidency of FISA. Mosley said that his decision to challenge the Frenchman was prompted by Balestre's reported intervention on behalf of his countryman Alain Prost to ensure that race stewards disqualified Brazilian driver Ayrton Senna from the 1989 Japanese Grand Prix. Mosley campaigned on the basis that Balestre, who was also president of the FIA and of the Fédération Française du Sport Automobile, could not effectively manage all these roles together. He also said that no-one challenged Balestre because they were afraid of the consequences and suggested that the FISA President should not interfere with F1, which could be left to run itself. Mosley won the FISA presidency by 43 votes to 29; Balestre remained as FIA president. Mosley resigned a year later, fulfilling a promise made during his election campaign to seek a re-affirmation of his mandate. "I wanted to show people that I do what I say", he said. "Now they can judge me in a year's time." FISA immediately re-elected him.

== FIA presidency ==
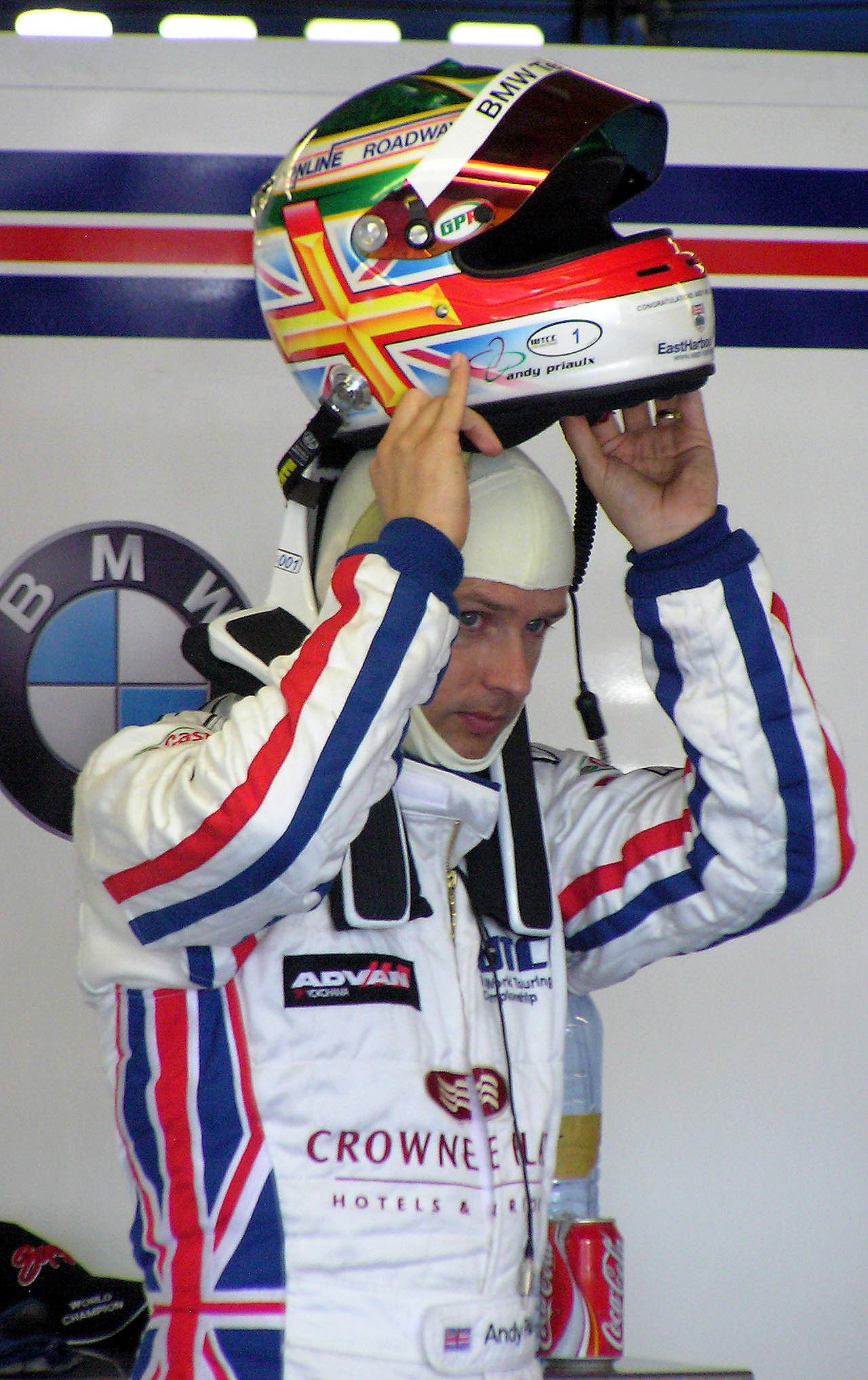
Three-times WTCC Champion Andy Priaulx wearing the HANS device now mandated in FIA championships

=== 1993–1997 ===
In 1993, Mosley agreed with Balestre that the Frenchman would stand down as president of the FIA in Mosley's favour, in return for the new role of President of the FIA Senate, to be created after Mosley's election. As well as motorsport, the FIA's remit includes the interests of motorists worldwide, an area in which Mosley wanted to involve himself. He had said, "That is what really interested me: [in F1] you maybe save one life every five years, whereas [in] road safety you are talking about thousands of lives". A challenge to Mosley's election by Jeffrey Rose, chairman of the British Royal Automobile Club, which arose was withdrawn when it became clear that the majority of voters were already committed to Mosley. The FISA was then merged into the FIA as its sporting arm.

After the deaths of the drivers Ayrton Senna and Roland Ratzenberger at the 1994 San Marino Grand Prix, worldwide media attention focused on the charismatic triple world champion Senna, rather than Ratzenberger, a virtual unknown driving for the minor Simtek team. Mosley did not go to Senna's funeral but attended that of Ratzenberger. In a press conference ten years later Mosley stated, "I went to his funeral because everyone went to Senna's. I thought it was important that somebody went to his".

In the aftermath of the deaths, and a number of other serious accidents, Mosley announced the formation of the Advisory Expert Group chaired by Professor Sid Watkins, to research and improve safety in motor racing. Watkins, who learned of his new role by hearing Mosley announce it on the radio, has called it a "novel and revolutionary approach". The resulting changes included reducing the capacity and power of engines, the use of grooved tyres to reduce cornering speeds, the introduction of the HANS device to protect drivers' necks in accidents, circuit re-design, and greatly increased requirements for crash testing of chassis.

In 1995, a deal was signed between Ecclestone and the FIA that passed all of the commercial rights to Formula One to him for fifteen years, on the condition that they would return to the FIA at the end of that period. Ecclestone had been building up Formula One as a television package since the early 1990s, investing heavily in new digital television technology. For the duration of the deal, the FIA would receive an index-linked annual fixed royalty, estimated by Lovell at around 15%. Mosley said "My belief is that I got a better deal than anyone else could have because it was more difficult for Ecclestone to take a hard line with me as we had worked together for so long."

In 1996, the FIA also passed the rights to all its other directly sanctioned championships and events to Ecclestone, also for 15 years. An attempt to add a 10-year extension to the F1 contract in return for a share in Ecclestone's proposed flotation of Formula One was later vetoed by the European Commission. Mosley's agreement with Ecclestone on television rights for F1 angered three of the team principals in particular: Ron Dennis (McLaren), Frank Williams (Williams), and Ken Tyrrell (Tyrrell), who felt that neither Ecclestone nor the FIA had the right to make such an agreement without the teams. They refused to sign the 1997 Concorde Agreement without increased financial returns and threatened to make a complaint under European Union competition rules. The European Commission was already investigating the FIA's agreement with Ecclestone in what Lovell calls a "highly personal and bitter battle between Max Mosley and [EU commissioner Karel] van Miert".

=== 1997–2001 ===
Mosley was elected to his second term as president of the FIA in October 1997. Later that year, the EU Commission Directorate-General for Competition made a preliminary decision against Ecclestone and the FIA. The resulting warning letters from van Miert to the FIA and Ecclestone were leaked and ended the attempt to float F1; the FIA won a case against the commission for the leak in 1998.

At the same time, a local court in Germany ruled that the television rights to the FIA European Truck Racing Cup (passed to Ecclestone by the FIA the previous year, along with all other FIA authorised championships) should be returned to the series organiser, following a complaint from German television company AE TV-Cooperations. The TV Company argued that Ecclestone and Mosley were in breach of commercial clauses in the Treaty of Rome; following the court's decision Mosley appealed the judgement and cancelled the series until further notice.

On appeal, the court ruled that the series organiser should be able to sell the television rights to whoever they felt was the best option for coverage and the FIA reinstated the European Truck Racing Cup. Between 1997 and 2000, Mosley repeatedly warned that if any EU decision went against the FIA, the marketing organisations and F1 itself would be moved out of Europe. In 1999, the EU Commission Directorate-General for Competition issued a Statement of Objections, listing a number of grievances surrounding the FIA's dealings with Ecclestone and Formula One. The FIA released the Statement to the media and held a press conference in Brussels ridiculing the commission's case.

The Commission argued that a number of commercial agreements could be viewed as anti-competitive and invited the FIA and Ecclestone's companies, ISC and FOA, to submit proposals to modify these arrangements. In 2001, nine months after settlement talks had begun, the parties reached an agreement to amend existing contracts, which included Ecclestone stepping down as the FIA's vice-president of promotional affairs and the FIA ending all involvement in the commercial activities of Formula One.

Mosley came up with an innovative way to dispose of the FIA's involvement in the commercial activities of Formula One. In order to maintain Ecclestone's investment to deliver digital television, he proposed extending Ecclestone's rights for F1 coverage to 100 years from the initial 15, arguing that a deal of such length could not be anti-competition as it was effectively the same as an outright sale. The Commission agreed with his assessment and in the interest of impartiality, Mosley removed himself from the negotiations, which eventually returned around $300 million (£150 million).

The FIA planned to "put almost all of it into a charitable foundation which will then have the resources to undertake important work on improving safety in motor sport and in road safety", and thus the FIA Foundation was created in 2001. In addition, the FIA continued to receive an annual dividend from the deal, Mosley stated: "Over the totality of the contract, and on an annual basis, the sum we have accepted represents billions of dollars. Looked at from that point of view, it is a huge amount of money." Lovell compares the figure to extend the rights to 100 years to the £600 million KirchGruppe paid for the rights to the 2002 Football World Cup and the £1.1 billion British Sky Broadcasting paid for a three-year package of English Premier League football.

The figure was not entirely comparable due to the dispute over who actually owned Formula One. Before the settlement with the EU Commission was reached, Mosley feared that the FIA was losing control over the sport following a heated argument with Ecclestone in Paris. Ecclestone argued that he had built Formula One into the entity that it was and the FIA only had rights to designate the event as official. Ecclestone threatened to "do a scorched earth" if another party were to gain control of the commercial side of Formula One. Mosley came up with the solution in order for the FIA to retain its sporting management role and Ecclestone to retain his commercial role.

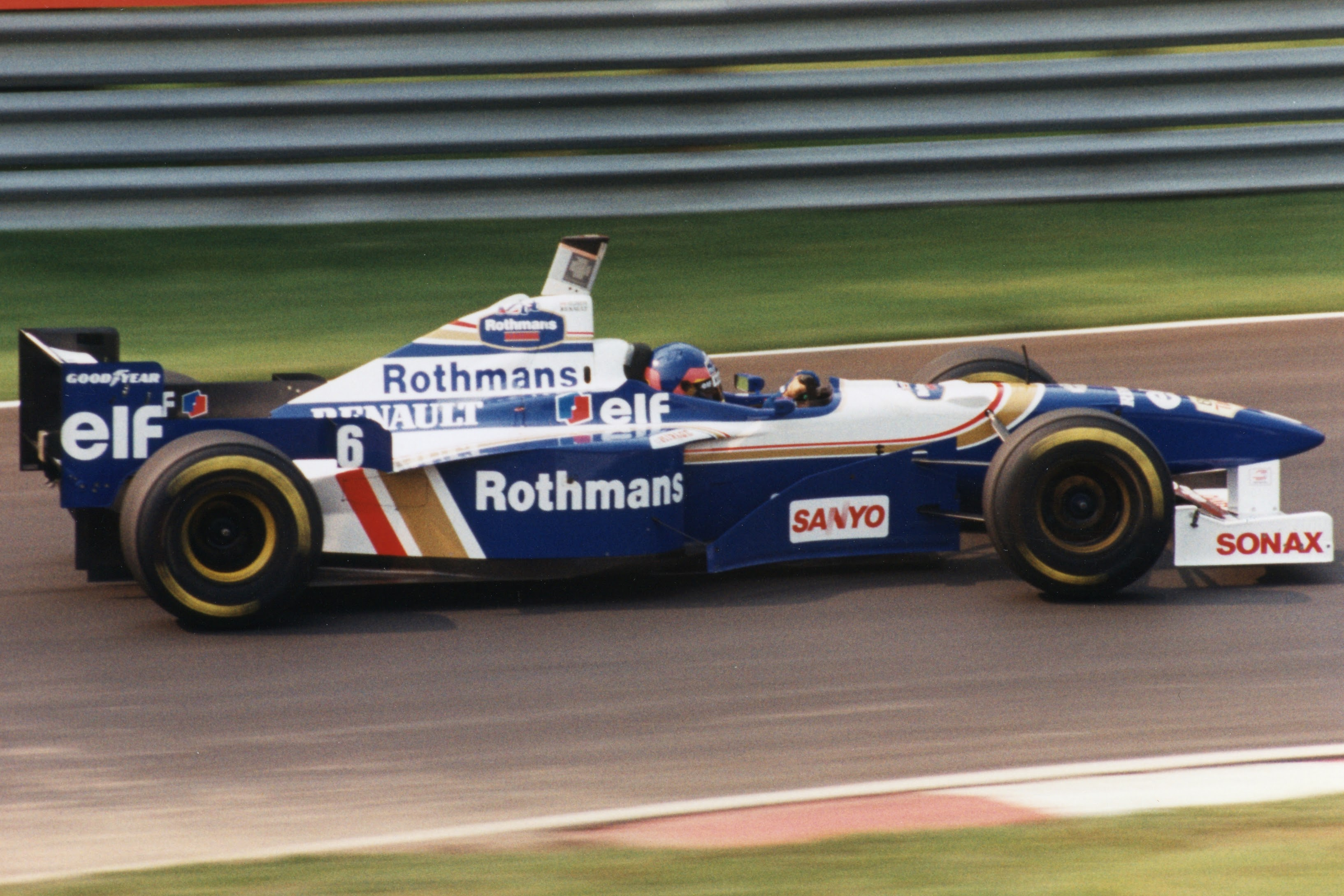
From the late 1960s to the early 2000s, F1 teams were heavily dependent on funding from cigarette companies like Rothmans. Mosley attempted to delay European legislation to outlaw the practice.

Over the same period, Mosley was attempting to delay European legislation banning tobacco advertising. Formula One advertisements were controlled by Paddy McNally, an ex-Marlboro sponsorship consultant, and his company Allsport Management SA. At this time, all leading Formula One teams carried significant branding from tobacco brands; for instance, Williams ran with backing from Rothmans; West was a backer of several teams including McLaren; McLaren also enjoyed a long-term relationship with Marlboro, as did Ferrari, and Mild Seven backed Benetton's Formula One effort. The Labour party had pledged to ban tobacco advertising in its manifesto ahead of its 1997 General Election victory, supporting a proposed European Union Directive. The Labour Party's stance on banning tobacco advertising was reinforced following the election by forceful statements from the Health Secretary Frank Dobson and Minister for Public Health Tessa Jowell.

Ecclestone appealed "over Jowell's head" to Jonathan Powell, Tony Blair's chief of staff, who arranged a meeting with Blair. Ecclestone and Mosley, both Labour Party donors, met Blair on 16 October 1997. Mosley argued that the proposed legislation was illegal by EU rules, that Formula One needed more time to find alternative sources of funding and that the prompt introduction of a ban would lead to races being held outside Europe, while the coverage, including tobacco logos, would still be broadcast into the EU. He also argued that:

Motor racing was a world class industry which put Britain at the hi-tech edge. Deprived of tobacco money, Formula One would move abroad at the loss of 50,000 jobs, 150,000 part-time jobs and £900 million of exports.

On 4 November, the "fiercely anti-tobacco Jowell" argued in Brussels for an exemption for Formula One. Media attention initially focused on Labour bending its principles for a "glamour sport" and on the "false trail" of Jowell's husband's links to the Benetton Formula team. On 6 November, correspondents from three newspapers enquired whether Labour had received any donations from Ecclestone; he had donated £1 million in January 1997. On 11 November, Labour promised to return the money on the advice of Sir Patrick Neill.

On 17 November, Blair apologised for his government's mishandling of the affair and stated "the decision to exempt Formula One from tobacco sponsorship was taken two weeks later. It was in response to fears that Britain might lose the industry overseas to Asian countries who were bidding for it."

The revised directive went into force in June 1998, and banned sponsorship from 2003, with a further three-year extension for "global sports such as Formula One". On 5 October 2000, the directive was overturned in the European Court of Justice on the grounds that it was unlawful. A new Tobacco Advertising Directive took effect in July 2005; the Financial Times described Mosley as "furious" that this was a year earlier than provided for under the 1998 directive. As of 2009, Ferrari is the only F1 team to retain tobacco sponsorship, although the team carries no explicit branding in races because of the European legislation. Although the FIA moved its headquarters out of the EU in 1999, it returned in 2001.

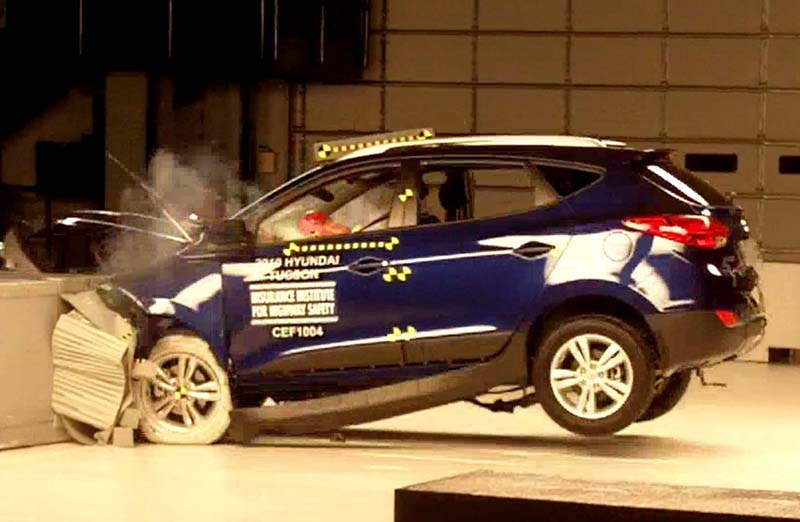
Mosley considered the use of F1 to promote Euro NCAP testing of cars his most enduring achievement as FIA president.

Asked in a 2003 interview about his most enduring achievement as president of the FIA, Mosley replied: "I think using Formula One to push ENCAP Crash-Testing." The European New Car Assessment Programme (Euro NCAP) is a European car safety performance assessment programme that originated with work done by the Transport Research Laboratory for the UK Department for Transport. The FIA became involved in the programme in 1996, taking a lead in promoting it, and Mosley chaired the body from its launch as Euro NCAP in 1997 to 2004.

Despite what NCAP describes as a "strong negative response" from car manufacturers at first, the initiative has expanded, and NCAP says that there has been a clear increase in the safety of modern cars as a result. The EU commission in 2000 stated that "EuroNCAP had become the single most important mechanism for achieving advances in vehicle safety" and "the most cost effective road safety action available to the EU." Mosley continued to promote the matter through his membership of initiatives such as CARS 21, the European Commission's policy group aimed at improving the worldwide competitiveness of the European automotive industry.

In February 2001, Mosley announced his intention to stand again for the presidency in October of that year, saying that if successful this third term would be his last.

=== 2001–2005 ===
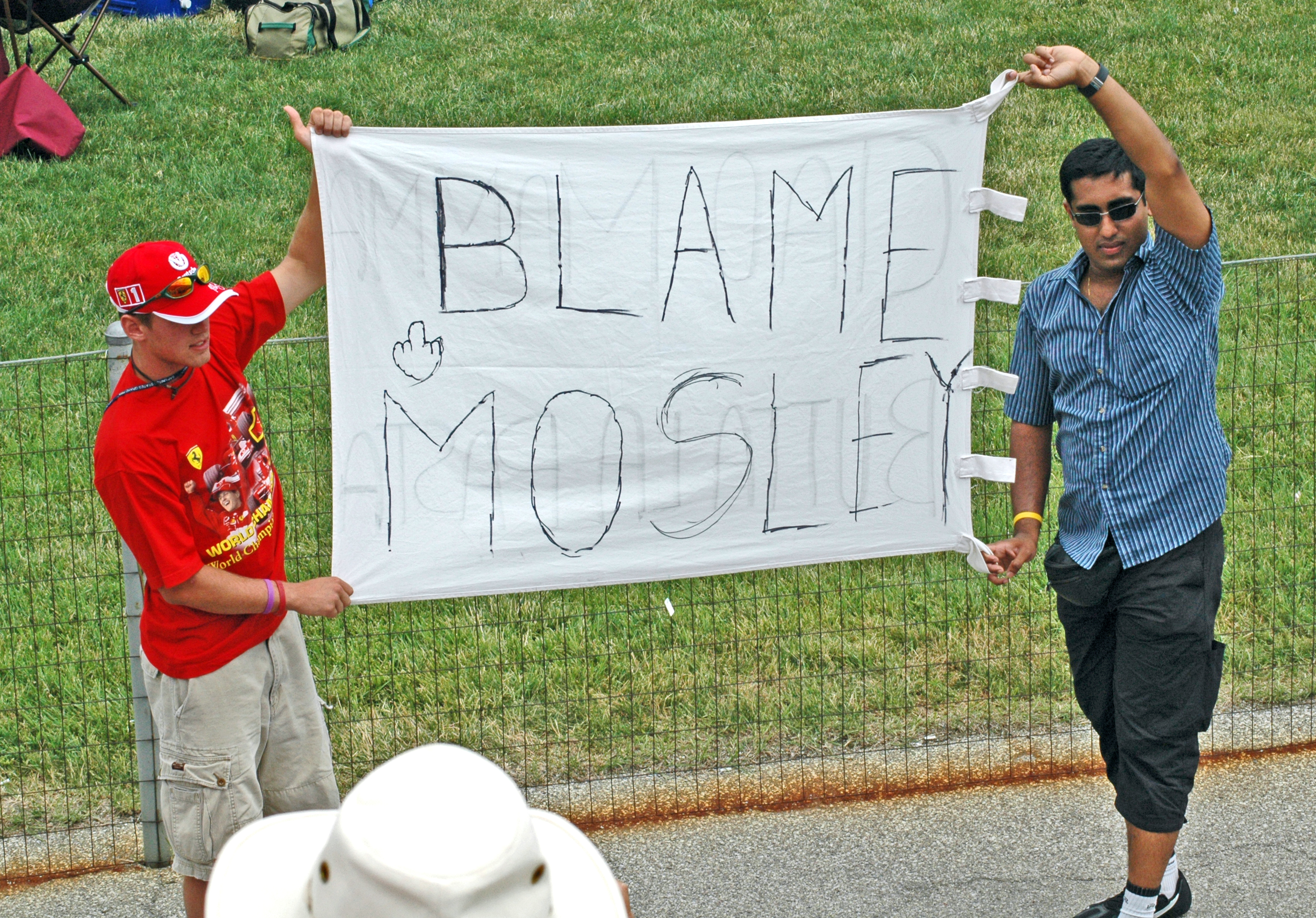
Formula One fans at the controversial 2005 United States Grand Prix, where only six cars raced, holding a banner with the words "Blame Mosley"

Mosley was elected to his third term as president of the FIA in 2001. From 2000, Formula One saw the return of teams partly or wholly owned and operated by major motor manufacturers, who feared that under Ecclestone's management F1 coverage would go to pay television, reducing the value of their investment. In 2001, the Grand Prix Manufacturers Association (GPMA) announced an alternative world championship, the Grand Prix World Championship to start by 2008. The GPMA stipulated that the championship should not be regulated by the FIA, which Lovell believes was because the organisation believed Mosley was too close to Ecclestone. The proposed championship came to nothing and the GPMA later became the Formula One Teams Association (FOTA).

In June 2004, Mosley announced that he would step down from his position in October of that year, one year early, saying "I no longer find it either satisfying or interesting to sit in long meetings [...] I have achieved in this job everything I set out to [...]". One month later, he rescinded his decision after the FIA Senate called for him to stay on. According to a BBC Sport profile, many insiders considered that the announcement, and Mosley's public disagreements with Ecclestone, were "just part of a well crafted plan to strengthen their control over the sport"; Ron Dennis, the McLaren team principal, suggested that it arose because Mosley's proposals for Formula One met opposition. In 2004, Mosley said he felt Ferrari's then team principal Jean Todt should succeed him as president of the FIA when he stepped down.

The 2005 United States Grand Prix was run with only six cars, after the Michelin tyres used by the other 14 cars proved unsafe for the circuit. A proposal involving the addition of a temporary chicane to slow cars through the fastest corner of the circuit was suggested but rejected by Mosley. He stated his reasons for not agreeing to the chicane: "Formula One is a dangerous activity and it would be most unwise to make fundamental changes to a circuit without following tried and tested procedures. What happened was bad but can be put right. This is not true of a fatality." He continued, "Formula One is a sport which entertains. It is not entertainment disguised as sport."

Mosley gave three possible solutions for the Michelin runners: to use qualifying tyres but change them whenever necessary on safety grounds, to use a different tyre to be provided by Michelin or to run at reduced speed. These were all rejected by the Michelin-shod teams. Paul Stoddart, the owner of the Minardi team who ran on Bridgestone tyres, was prepared to compromise to accommodate Michelin teams—even though a reduced field would guarantee his team much needed points—and was particularly vocal in his criticism and renewed his calls for Mosley to resign.

=== 2005–2009 ===
Mosley was elected unopposed to his fourth term as president of the FIA in 2005. In recognition of his contribution to road safety and motorsport, Mosley was made a Chevalier dans l'Ordre de la Légion d'honneur in 2006. The Légion d'honneur (Legion of Honour) is France's highest decoration for outstanding achievements in military or civil life; a Chevalier (Knight) is the fifth class.

Continuing a theme of his presidency, in 2006 Mosley called for Formula One manufacturers to develop technology relevant to road cars. In recent years, a large proportion of the enormous budget of Formula One has been spent on the development of very powerful, very high-revving engines, which some say have little applicability to road cars. Mosley announced a 10-year freeze on the development of engines, to allow manufacturers to spend more of their budgets on environmentally friendly technology such as the Kinetic Energy Recovery System (KERS) introduced in 2009. In July 2008, he sent a letter to the Formula One teams, in which he called for the teams to propose future sporting regulations to address specific issues including reduced fuel consumption.

The 2007 Formula One season was dominated by Ferrari's accusations that the McLaren team had made illegal use of their intellectual property, leading to legal cases in the United Kingdom and Italy. Unlike previous cases, such as the Toyota team's illegal use of Ferrari intellectual property in 2004 that had been handled by German police, the FIA investigated. They initially found McLaren innocent; unable to find enough evidence to suggest that anyone other than designer Mike Coughlan had seen the information or that the team had used it. Ron Dennis, team principal of McLaren, was unaware at this point that Mosley had been sent personal e-mails from Fernando Alonso, stating that the data had been used and seen by others in the team. When Italian police uncovered a series of text messages between McLaren and their spy at Ferrari, the team was hauled in front of the World Motor Sports Council (WMSC) once more. This time they were found guilty and eventually fined a gross $100M and excluded from the 2007 constructors' championship. Later in the year, the Renault team was found guilty by the FIA of possessing some of McLaren's intellectual property, but was not punished, as the "FIA's WMSC decided there was not enough evidence to show the championship had been affected." In relation to McLaren, triple world champion Jackie Stewart criticised Mosley and stated that other teams did not back McLaren for "fear of repercussions". Television commentator and newspaper columnist Martin Brundle, a former driver, was among those who criticised the FIA and Mosley for inconsistency and questioned the "energetic manner" in which he felt McLaren was being pursued, suggesting that there was a "witch hunt" against the team. Brundle and the Sunday Times subsequently received a writ for libel before the paper printed a correction. Mosley went on to defend himself of the charges made by Brundle, highlighting that the WMSC originally acquitted McLaren of any wrongdoing, stating: "Concrete evidence of use by McLaren of the Ferrari information was simply not there." It was only later in the year when "e-mails emerged which showed others inside McLaren were indeed aware of the Ferrari information", that the FIA found the team guilty.

At the start of 2008, Mosley said that he wanted to see through reforms such as budget capping and new technologies like KERS introduced into Formula One before retiring. In March of that year, the News of the World released video footage of Mosley engaged in acts with five consenting women in a scenario that the paper alleged involved Nazi role-playing (an allegation that, though dismissed in court as having "no genuine basis", allegedly "ruined" Mosley's reputation). The situation was made more controversial by his father's association with the Nazis. Mosley admitted "the embarrassment the revelations caused", but said that there was no Nazi theme involved. He was strongly criticised by former drivers, motor manufacturers, and several of the national motoring bodies who form the FIA. His involvement in the Bahrain Grand Prix was cancelled. Public expressions of support were limited. Mosley said that he received much supportive correspondence, and said that he would continue to the end of his current term, which he said would be his last. Mosley's longtime ally Ecclestone eventually appeared to support Mosley's removal.

Mosley won a vote of confidence at an Extraordinary General Meeting of the FIA on 3 June 2008, with 103 votes in support and 55 against, with seven abstentions and four invalid votes. Several clubs, including the ADAC, AAA and KNAC Nationale Autosport Federatie (KNAF) considered withdrawal from the FIA after the decision. Other formerly critical organisations subsequently said that they would accept the outcome of the vote and wished to move on. In July 2008, Mosley won a High Court legal case against the News of the World for invasion of privacy. The presiding judge, Mr Justice Eady, said there was: "no evidence that the gathering on 28 March 2008 was intended to be an enactment of Nazi behaviour or adoption of any of its attitudes. Nor was it in fact. I see no genuine basis at all for the suggestion that the participants mocked the victims of the Holocaust."

In December 2008, Mosley said that he still intended to stand down when his term ran out in October 2009, but would take the final decision in June of that year. Mosley's close relationship with Ecclestone, the sport's promoter, was criticised in early 2009 by Sir Jackie Stewart, who suggested that Mosley should resign in favour of a CEO from outside motorsport.

In mid-2009, the FIA and the newly formed Formula One Teams Association disagreed over the format of rules for the following season. When the entry list for the 2010 championship was announced on 12 June 2009, the entries of five of the eight FOTA teams remained provisional on their acceptance of the new rules. The next day, the European Automobile Manufacturers Association announced its support for FOTA's request for "stability, clear rules, a clear and transparent system of governance" and their threat to form a breakaway series from Formula One. The BBC Sport website reported this as an attack on Mosley's authority and noted that Mosley was expected to stand again for the presidency in 2009.

On 23 June, Mosley said he was considering running for a fifth term as FIA president in October "in light of the attack on my mandate". However, the following day FOTA and the FIA reached an agreement with Mosley agreeing not to stand for re-election as part of the deal: 'now there is peace'. Luca di Montezemolo welcomed Mosley's decision to stand down and called Mosley a 'dictator'. Mosley responded by saying that he was still considering his 'options' and might well stand for re-election in October after all. He later said that he was "under pressure from all over the world" to stand for re-election. On 15 July, Mosley confirmed that he would after all stand down, and again endorsed former Ferrari Executive Director Jean Todt as his successor. Todt subsequently became president.

== Privacy litigation ==
In 2008, Mosley won a court case (Mosley v News Group Newspapers) against the News of the World newspaper—which had reported his involvement in what it said was a Nazi-themed sex act involving five women—on the grounds that it had breached his privacy. Justice Eady ruled that, despite one of the attendees wearing a military uniform, there were no Nazi connotations to the orgy. As a result, in 2009 Mosley brought a case (Mosley v United Kingdom) against the UK's privacy laws in the European Court of Human Rights, in a bid to force newspapers to warn people before exposing their private lives so they could have the opportunity to seek a court injunction. The case was rejected by the court on 10 May 2011 as they argued that a "pre-notification requirement would inevitably affect political reporting and serious journalism."

In July 2011, The Daily Telegraph reported that Mosley was financially guaranteeing the court costs of claimants who may have been subjected to phone hacking by the News of the World. Mosley refused to comment at the time, but he later gave a television interview to the BBC and a telephone interview to Reuters where he confirmed the story.

Mosley launched legal action against Google, in an attempt to stop searches from returning web pages which use the photographs from the video used for the News of the World story. On 6 November 2013, in Mosley v SARL Google, a French court sided with Mosley and ordered Google to prevent its search engine from providing links to images of Mosley engaging in sexual activities from the video. The Register suggested the ruling would lead to a Streisand effect, increasing interest in the images, which are still findable through other search engines. At the Leveson Inquiry, Mosley stated his reasons for pursuing Google:

the fundamental point is that Google could stop this material appearing but they don't, or they won't as a matter of principle. My position is that if the search engines – if somebody were to stop the search engines producing the material, the actual sites don't really matter because without a search engine, nobody will find it, it would just be a few friends of the person who posts it. The really dangerous things are the search engines.

Mosley launched similar legal action against Google in Germany. In January 2014, the German court also ruled against the American company. In giving its verdict, the court stated, "that the banned pictures of the plaintiff severely violate his private sphere."

In an interview with Der Spiegel following the judgement, Mosley said: "Strictly speaking Google has got to obey German courts in Germany and French courts in France. But in the end it has to decide whether it wants to live in a democracy. Google behaves like an adolescent rebelling against the establishment. The company has to recognise that it is a part of society and it must accept the responsibility which comes with that." Mosley then launched proceedings against Google in the UK. All the cases were eventually settled in May 2015.

In late February 2018, the Daily Mail reported that Mosley had published a leaflet in the early 1960s linking black immigration to the spread of diseases, the implication being that Mosley had committed perjury in the High Court when giving evidence in his libel case against the News of the World. In an interview with Cathy Newman on Channel 4 News, he conceded that a passage in the leaflet "probably is racist", which he denied ever publishing, and rejected the accusation he had lied in court. The following day, the Labour Party said it would not accept any further donations from Mosley, including further support for the office of deputy leader Tom Watson; Mosley had donated £500,000 in total to Watson's office. Asked what he would do about the Daily Mail's publication of its article, Mosley said what happened next was, "entirely in the hands of my lawyers".

In December 2020, it was announced that the High Court had rejected Mosley's legal action against the publisher of the Daily Mail for sending a dossier which suggested that he had lied under oath to prosecutors. Justice Matthew Nicklin wrote that "The claimant's pleaded claim discloses no reasonable grounds for bringing his claim for malicious prosecution." In fact, no prosecution had taken place.

== Death ==
Mosley died by suicide on 23 May 2021 after developing cancer, with the news being confirmed by Bernie Ecclestone. He was 81. He was buried next to his mother in St. Mary's Churchyard, Swinbrook, Oxfordshire. His wife Jean died later in the same year, aged 81, and was interred with him.

On 29 March 2022, an inquest into his death confirmed that Mosley was found with a fatal gunshot wound to his head. Mosley had been told that he had just "weeks" to live and told his personal assistant of 20 years that he was going to take his own life the day before he did so.

== Dramatic depiction ==
Mosley is played by Ron Cook in the 2025 ITV drama about the News International phone hacking scandal, The Hack.

== Racing records ==
=== Formula One non-championship results ===
(key)

| Year | Entrant | Chassis | Engine | 1 | 2 | 3 | 4 | Ref |
|---|---|---|---|---|---|---|---|---|
| 1969 | Len Street Engineering | Lotus 59 F2 | Cosworth FVA 1.6 L4 | ROC | INT | MAD; Ret | OUL | |

== Honours ==
- Grande Ufficiale dell' Ordine al Merito (Italy) 1994.
- Castrol Gold Medal from the Institute of Motor Industry in the year 2000.
- Order of Madarski Konnik, 1st degree (Bulgaria), 2000.
- Quattroruote Premio Speciale per la Sicurezza Stradale (Italy), 2001.
- The Goldene VdM-Dieselring, 2001.
- Order of Merit (Romania), 2004.
- Northumbria University awarded Mosley an Honorary Doctorate of Civil Law in 2005.
- Huespad Illustre do Quito (Ecuador), 2005.
- National Road Safety Council NGO, Armenia, 2005.
- France: Chevalier of the Légion d'honneur (2006).
- Monaco: Commander of the Order of Saint-Charles (27 May 2006).

== Appointments ==
- Secretary, Oxford Union Society, 1961
- 1964, Called to the Bar, Gray's Inn
- Director of March Cars, 1969–79
- Member of High Level Gp, CARS (Competitive Automotive Regulatory System for the 21st century) 21, 2005–09
- Patron at eSafety Aware, 2006–2009
- Member of the Board of Trustees, 2001–2014, Chairman of the Programmes Committee, 2001–2012, FIA Foundation for the Automobile and Society
- Chairmanship of Euro NCAP, Global NCAP, ERTICO
- Honorary President of European Parliament Automobile Users' Intergroup

== Citations ==
Sporting positions
| Preceded by Jean-Marie Balestre | President of the Fédération Internationale de l'Automobile; 1993–2009 | Succeeded by Jean Todt |
