= Mosley v SARL Google =

Mosley v SARL Google was a 2013 French court case in which a former president of the Fédération Internationale de l'Automobile, Max Mosley, attempted to make the Internet search engine Google remove images of him engaging in a sado-masochistic sex act with several prostitutes.

The publication of the images in the now-defunct British newspaper News of the World was litigated in Mosley v News Group Newspapers and resulted in Mosley being awarded £60,000 in damages.
