= Pierre Ugeux =

Belgian paratrooper during World War II

President of the Commission Sportive Internationale (CSI)
- In office 1976–1978
- Preceded by: Paul Metternich
- Succeeded by: Jean-Marie Balestre

Personal details
- Born: (c. 1914) Belgium
- Died: 12 January 2009 (aged 94–95) Saint-Siffret, France

Pierre Ugeux (c. 1914 – 12 January 2009) was a paratrooper during World War II and worked closely with British Intelligence as a Major in the French section of the Special Operations Executive (SOE). He was assigned to work with the famous Comet line Belgian Resistance member Micheline Dumon (code named "Lily" and "Michou") during WWII. They met in London after she had been extracted from Europe in 1944 and ended up marrying the following year. After the war, Ugeux played a significant role in Belgium's gas and electricity industry as director of the Belgian Power Authority.

A passionate motorsports enthusiast, Ugeux was President of the Commission Sportive Internationale (CSI) sports governing body from 1976 to 1978, which was renamed the Fédération Internationale du Sport Automobile (FISA) after his tenure. His responsibilities at CSI included overseeing all the racing regulations of Formula One. Ugeux was also President of the Royal Automobile Club Belgium (RACB).
