= Grand Prix Manufacturers Association =

The Grand Prix Manufacturers Association (GPMA) was an alliance of car manufacturers that participated in Formula One formed (like its predecessor GPWC) to act as a tool to assist the companies in bargaining with Bernie Ecclestone for an agreeable extension to the 1997 Concorde Agreement, the contract by whose terms the teams compete in F1. It was then superseded by the Formula One Teams Association, founded in 2008, and disbanded in 2014.

== Members ==
(as at time of formation of FOTA)

- BMW Group (BMW Sauber)
- Mercedes-Benz (Shareholder of McLaren Group, of which Team McLaren is an operating division)

== Former members ==
- Ford (Jaguar Racing) – left Formula 1 altogether and GPWC, the predecessor to GPMA 24 October 2004.
- Honda (Honda Racing F1 Team) – left Formula 1 altogether and the GPMA after selling team in March 2009.
- Fiat (Scuderia Ferrari) – left GPWC, the predecessor to GPMA 19 January 2005.
- Toyota (Toyota F1) – announced decision to leave on 14 August 2006.
- Renault (Renault F1) – announced decision to leave on 16 February 2007.

On 27 March 2006, Formula One's five "rebel" manufacturer-backed teams signed up to the 2008 World Championship.
