= Concorde Agreement =

Contract between FIA and Formula One entities

The Concorde Agreement is a contract between the Fédération Internationale de l'Automobile (FIA), the Formula One (F1) teams and the Formula One Group which dictates the terms by which the teams compete in races, and how the television revenues and prize money are shared. There have been nine versions of the Concorde Agreement, all of which terms were kept strictly secret: the first one was signed in 1981, with newer agreements being signed in 1987, 1992, 1997, 1998, 2009, 2013, and 2021; the current agreement was signed in 2025. The secrecy was broken by racing journalist Forrest Bond, when the 120-page 1997 Concorde Agreement was published at the end of 2005 by RaceFax.

The intent of the agreements is to encourage professionalism and to increase the commercial success of Formula One. Conditions of the agreement generally include the obligation of the teams to participate in every race, hence making the sport more reliable for broadcasters, who were expected to invest heavily to acquire television broadcast rights, and a percentage of the sport's commercial revenue in return for the teams.

== First Concorde Agreement (1981–1986) ==
In 1979, the Commission Sportive Internationale, a subordinate organization of the FIA, which was at that time the rule-making body for Formula One, was dissolved. It was replaced by the Fédération Internationale du Sport Automobile (FISA), which would serve the same function. FISA clashed repeatedly with the Formula One Constructors Association (FOCA), which represented the teams' interests. FOCA's chief executive at the time was Bernie Ecclestone and his legal advisor was Max Mosley, while the president of FISA was Jean Marie Balestre.

The two organizations' disagreements, which came to be known as the FISA–FOCA war, resulted in several races being cancelled, or declared non-valid (e.g. the 1980 Spanish Grand Prix). Goodyear threatened to withdraw entirely from Formula One, an event which would have been commercially disastrous for the sport, so Ecclestone organized a meeting with all team managers, Balestre, and other FISA representatives at the FIA headquarters in Place de la Concorde, Paris, France. On 19 January 1981, after thirteen straight hours of negotiation, all parties present signed the first Concorde Agreement, named after the hotel in which the negotiations took place.

The contract's terms remain largely confidential, though its known stipulations required the signatory teams to appear and compete in every race, and guaranteed their right to do so in order to assure the sport's newly acquired television public that they would have a race to watch. Also, perhaps most importantly, the agreement granted FOCA the right to televise Formula One races — this right was "leased" to Formula One Promotions and Administration, a company established and owned by Bernie Ecclestone. Another important element was the stability in rules, described as protecting the teams from "the whims of the governing body".

It expired on 31 December 1987.

== Second Concorde Agreement (1987–1991) ==
The second Concorde Agreement governed the 1987 to 1991 seasons. When the second Concorde Agreement was agreed in 1987, Ecclestone ceased being a team owner and established Formula One Promotions and Administration (FOPA) to manage TV rights for the teams. FOPA would later become known as Formula One Management (FOM). FOPA received 49% of TV revenues: 1% went to the teams, and 50% to the FIA. FOPA also received all the fees paid by promoters and paid prize money to the teams.

== Third Concorde Agreement (1992–1996) ==
The third Concorde Agreement covered the 1992 to 1996 seasons. Ecclestone required the approval of Jean-Marie Balestre and the FIA to transfer Formula One television rights to FOCA. He arranged that his business partner Paddy McNally, who was proficient in French, should negotiate the agreement with Balestre, and eventually they came to terms. Balestre was unaware of Ecclestone's aggressive expansion and the value of the television rights. Max Mosley became FIA president shortly after in 1993.

== Fourth Concorde Agreement (1997–2002) ==
In 1995, the FIA decided to transfer Formula One's commercial rights from FOCA to Formula One Administration for a 14-year period. In exchange, Ecclestone would provide an annual payment. McLaren, Williams and Tyrrell protested this by rejecting the proposed Concorde Agreement (negotiations for which started as early as 1993). Ken Tyrrell in particular was enraged by the fact that Ecclestone, as the president of FOCA, had negotiated the transfer of the rights from the current organization to his own company. Tyrrell also objected the addendum to the Agreement being secret, arguing that secrecy surrounding the agreement would have only benefitted Ecclestone (by weakening the bargaining power of other parties).

The said three teams refused to sign the proposed Concorde Agreement, initially with the support of the remaining teams. However, on 5 September 1996 the new Concorde Agreement was signed by all teams except McLaren, Williams and Tyrrell. The agreement was supposed to be in effect from 1 January 1997 to 31 December 2002.

By taking a stand against the actions of Ecclestone, the FIA and the wider commercial aspects of Formula One, McLaren, Williams and Tyrrell lost both influence in the sport and the income which they would have received as signatories.

In 2005, racing journalist Forrest Bond published the 120-page 1997 Concorde Agreement on RaceFax, hence making it the first (and to this date only) version of the agreement to ever be released to the public.

== Fifth Concorde Agreement (1998–2007) ==
A compromise was reached and on 27 August 1998, a new Concorde Agreement was signed, which accommodated the three teams and which expired on 31 December 2007.

== Sixth Concorde Agreement (2008–2012) ==
On 7 December 2004, at a meeting attended by the bosses of all teams except Ferrari, Ecclestone offered a payout of £260,000,000 over three years in return for unanimous renewal of the fifth Concorde Agreement, which would guarantee the continuation of Formula One in its present form at least until the expiration of that contract.

On 19 January 2005, Ferrari announced that it had signed an extension to the previous agreement to expire on 31 December 2012. On 18 July 2005, Red Bull also signed an extension, as Jordan and Midland did two days later. On 7 December 2005, Williams became the fourth team to sign the extension.

On 27 March 2006, the five Grand Prix Manufacturers Association-backed teams - BMW Sauber, Renault, Honda, McLaren and Toyota - submitted their applications for the 2008 season, agreeing to stay in the sport until 2012. On 14 May 2006, the five GPMA-backed teams signed a memorandum of understanding with the commercial rightsholders (CVC/Ecclestone) which formed the basis of the next Concorde Agreement. As such, a full Concorde Agreement was not in place for the 2008 season, with the Memorandum, extensions and agreements with the other individual teams acting as a stop-gap solution.

On 29 July 2008, the ten currently competing teams created the Formula One Teams Association (FOTA) to negotiate the terms of contract. After a dispute between FOTA and the FIA in the first half of 2009, a new Concorde Agreement was signed by Mosley and all of the teams. (Sauber, in transition as majority owner of BMW, had announced shortly beforehand its intention of withdrawing from the sport at the end of the season, so waited until a controlling stake of the team was returned to Peter Sauber before signing.) The new agreement provides for a continuation of the terms of the 1998 agreement, and ran until 31 December 2012. At the same meeting of the FIA World Motor Sport Council, a programme of resource restriction was also agreed upon, as were a revised set of sporting and technical regulations for the 2010 season.

== Seventh Concorde Agreement (2013–2020) ==
The 2013 Concorde Agreement took an extended period of negotiations. The sixth agreement ran until 31 December 2012, but no new agreement was in place for the start of the 2013 season. In October 2012 FIA communicated that they were expecting a final settlement between all parties involved within weeks. In reality it took until September 2013.

Strictly speaking the 2013 Agreement does not really meet the qualifications for a 'Concorde' Agreement, as it is not a collective agreement among the parties involved. Rather, it is a series of individual bilateral agreements between Bernie Ecclestone's Formula One Group and all other parties involved being FIA and the individual Formula One teams.

In October 2012, Bernie Ecclestone indicated that he already had agreements with all teams for the 2013-2020 period. However, this list did not yet include Marussia. The Marussia Formula One Team did manage to sign its own bilateral agreement with the Formula One Group in October 2013.

The Concorde Implementation Agreement between the FIA and the Formula One Group was signed in July 2013 and was enforced on 27 September 2013. It expired on 31 December 2020. The FIA press announcement about this agreement mentioned that "the parties will move towards the conclusions of a multi-party Concorde agreement", but such a multi-party agreement never materialized.

== Eighth Concorde Agreement (2021–2025) ==
Negotiations over the terms to replace the 2013 agreement began as part of wider discussions over the future of the sport in 2017. A deadline to reach a deal was extended until 31 October 2019. The Agreement was reported to be nearing completion in January 2020, but was delayed due to the COVID-19 pandemic. During the 70th Anniversary Grand Prix weekend, Mercedes team principal Toto Wolff declared his dissatisfaction with the terms of the new agreement, which was to introduce a budget cap from the 2021 season and change the prize money distribution. Wolff believed that his team would be affected most negatively. In response, the deadline for signing the agreement, previously set for 12 August, was moved back a week. However, after discussions with Chase Carey, Wolff changed stance and declared his willingness to sign the new agreement. The new Concorde Agreement seeks to protect the value of the incumbent teams, by requiring new entrants to pay $200 million up front, shared equally among 10 existing teams, in exchange for having the right of revenue share in its first year of competition. Previously, new entries only received the prize money from their second year of competition. In March 2025, Cadillac were approved to join Formula 1 in 2026, although they have to pay $450 million to the existing teams.

On 18 August 2020, Ferrari, McLaren, and Williams announced that they had signed the new Concorde Agreement, whilst the following day Formula One announced that the other teams had also signed. The agreement, which is the first to be signed under new owners Liberty Media, covers the 2021 to 2025 seasons, and came into force on 1 January 2021.

== Ninth Concorde Agreement (2026–2030) ==
On 16 March 2025 it was announced that all 11 teams had signed the 2026 Concorde Commercial Agreement that will cover the 2026 to 2030 seasons, and came into force on 1 January 2026.

On 12 December 2025, Formula 1 and the FIA announced that both parties along with all 11 Formula 1 teams had signed the 2026 Concorde Governance Agreement.
