= Jean-Marie Balestre =

French motorsport administrator (1921–2008)

- Balestre c. 1985

President of the Fédération Internationale de l'Automobile
- In office 1985 – 23 October 1993
- Preceded by: Paul Alfons von Metternich-Winneburg
- Succeeded by: Max Mosley

President of the Fédération Internationale du Sport Automobile
- In office 1978–1991
- Preceded by: Pierre Ugeux
- Succeeded by: Max Mosley

Personal details
- Born: 9 April 1921 Saint-Rémy-de-Provence, Bouches-du-Rhône, France
- Died: 27 March 2008 (aged 86) Saint-Cloud, Paris, France

Jean-Marie Balestre (French pronunciation: [ʒɑ̃ maʁi balɛstʁ]; 9 April 1921 – 27 March 2008) was a French motorsport administrator and journalist. From 1978 to 1991, Balestre served as president of the Fédération Internationale du Sport Automobile (FISA); from 1985 to 1993, he also served as president of the Fédération Internationale de l'Automobile (FIA).

Born and raised in Saint-Rémy-de-Provence, Balestre initially studied law before becoming an automotive journalist. He was a member of the Schutzstaffel during World War II, reportedly in an undercover role for the French Resistance, receiving the Legion of Honour for services to France in 1968. After the war, he worked for Robert Hersant at L'Auto-Journal. He became a founding member of the Fédération Française du Sport Automobile (FFSA) in 1950, and was elected as the inaugural president of the Commission Internationale de Karting (CIK) in 1962. After being elected president of the FFSA in 1973, and the FIA's International Sporting Commission (CSI) in 1978, he transformed the latter into FISA that same year.

Balestre led FISA through the FISA–FOCA war with the Formula One Constructors' Association in the early-1980s. The dispute led to the Concorde Agreement in 1987, with the FIA—who Balestre had been elected president of in 1987—retaining control of the sporting and technical regulations of Formula One and FOCA claiming the commercial rights. He was replaced as president of FISA after losing a leadership election to Max Mosley, and resigned as FIA president in 1993. He remained president of the FFSA until 1996, when he retired from administration.

Balestre is credited with several major safety reforms in motorsport, including the implementation of crash testing and naturally aspirated engines in Formula One, as well as the decision to ban Group B in the World Rally Championship. He faced allegations of abusing his power to favour Alain Prost at the 1989 Japanese Grand Prix, following his title-deciding collision with Ayrton Senna; he did not intervene the following season, this time favouring Senna.

== Early life ==
Balestre was born at Saint-Rémy-de-Provence, Bouches-du-Rhône. He studied law in Paris, and afterwards worked as a journalist on a number of publications.

=== World War II ===
Details of Balestre's activities during World War II are unknown. He was a member of the French Nazi division of the SS. When photographs began to circulate of Balestre wearing a German uniform, he took unsuccessful legal action to suppress their publication. He later claimed to have been an undercover agent for the French Resistance, and received the Legion of Honour for service to France in 1968.

== Career ==
After the war, he worked as a journalist for Robert Hersant at a successful French automobile magazine called L'Auto-Journal. He continued to work with Hersant as he expanded his publishing operations, which made Balestre wealthy. He was a founding member of the Fédération Française du Sport Automobile, a French national motorsport organization, in 1950, and in 1962 became the first president of the Commission Internationale de Karting. He was elected president of the FFSA in 1973 and president of the FIA's International Sporting Commission in 1978. He was instrumental in transforming the International Sporting Commission into the Fédération Internationale du Sport Automobile (FISA) in 1978, winning the election by 29 votes to 11 over Tom Binford.

In the late 1970s, photographs began to circulate of Balestre wearing a German SS uniform, and he took unsuccessful legal action to suppress their publication.

Balestre was heavily involved in what is colloquially called the FISA–FOCA war, a political battle over finances and control of the Formula One World Championships between 1980 and 1982. Balestre and his opponent, Bernie Ecclestone, settled the dispute after Enzo Ferrari brokered a compromise. Balestre signed the first Concorde Agreement, under which FOCA was granted the commercial rights to Formula One while the FIA retained control of all sporting and technical regulations.

In 1986, a few hours after the death of Henri Toivonen and Sergio Cresto in a crash, Balestre announced the unilateral decision of FISA to ban Group B rallying in favour of the slower, less technically advanced Group A. Despite this decision, WRC driver fatalities peaked in 1989.

Balestre is credited with establishing specific crash test requirements for Formula One cars, significantly improving the safety of the sport. He was also a key proponent of the switch to naturally aspirated engines in 1989, arguing that such a move was essential for safety reasons.

However, Balestre has also been accused of using his power for more than it was intended. In 1989, after Ayrton Senna and Alain Prost collided at Suzuka, there were implications in Autosport magazine that Balestre was involved in manipulating the World Championship in favour of Prost, as Senna would be disqualified from the race, fined, and suspended. This ultimately led to Max Mosley's decision to run for the FISA presidency. Senna fell out with Balestre, who threatened to revoke his super license but was included on the 1990 entry list. However, when Senna collided with Prost in 1990 at the same circuit, Balestre did not intervene or sanction the Brazilian.

Balestre was elected as president of the FIA, while remaining president of FISA, in 1986. He was replaced as president of FISA in 1991 when he lost the election to Max Mosley in October by a vote of 43 to 29. Facing certain defeat in the re-election to the FIA presidency in October 1993, Balestre elected to stand down, and proposed that FISA be abolished and Mosley replace him as president of the FIA. Balestre maintained the presidency of the FFSA until the end of 1996.

== Death ==
Balestre died on 27 March 2008, aged 86.

Sporting positions
| Preceded by Claude Bourillot | President of the Fédération Française du Sport Automobile; 1972–1996 | Succeeded by Jacques Regis |
| Preceded by Pierre Ugeux | President of the Fédération Internationale du Sport Automobile (FISA); 1978–1991 | Succeeded by Max Mosley |
| Preceded by Paul von Metternich | President of the Fédération Internationale de l'Automobile; 1985–1993 | Succeeded by Max Mosley |
