= FISA–FOCA war =

Political battle between two Formula One organisations

The FISA–FOCA war was a political battle contested throughout the early 1980s by two now-defunct representative organizations in Formula One motor racing, the Fédération Internationale du Sport Automobile (FISA) and the Formula One Constructors Association (FOCA). The battle boiled during the late 1970s and early 1980s and came to a head when the racing teams affiliated with FOCA, an equivalent to a racing team union, boycotted the 1982 San Marino Grand Prix.

== Introduction ==
The battle for control of Formula One was contested between the Fédération Internationale du Sport Automobile (FISA), at the time an autonomous subcommittee of the FIA, and the Formula One Constructors' Association (FOCA).

The key figures involved were Jean-Marie Balestre, the FISA president at the time, Bernie Ecclestone, who led FOCA and owned the Brabham Formula One team, and Max Mosley, who later became the president of the FIA but then served as a legal advisor to both Ecclestone's Brabham team and FOCA in general.

The beginnings of the dispute are numerous, and many of the underlying reasons may be lost in history. The teams (except Ferrari and the other major manufacturers – Renault and Alfa Romeo in particular) were of the opinion that their rights and ability to compete against the larger and better funded teams were being negatively affected by a perceived bias on the part of FISA, the controlling organisation, toward the major manufacturers.

In addition, the battle revolved around the commercial aspects of the sport (the FOCA teams were unhappy with the disbursement of proceeds from the races) and the technical regulations which, in FOCA's opinion, tended to be malleable according to the nature of the transgressor more than the nature of the transgression.

The battles raged throughout the late 1970s and early 1980s, the first major confrontation being at the 1980 Spanish Grand Prix. In the buildup to the race, FISA fined the majority of the FOCA team drivers who had not appeared at the drivers' briefings at the Belgian and Monaco races and unless the fines were paid, the drivers at fault would have their racing licences revoked by the governing body. After a lengthy debate between the teams, the drivers, FOCA and FISA, the race went ahead at the insistence of King Juan Carlos without FISA's sanctioning or the support of the factory teams. The race, won by eventual 1980 World Champion Alan Jones in a Williams-Ford, was therefore run as a non-championship event.

A notable point of the dispute was the formation of a short lived "World Federation of Motorsport" in November 1980. This new, rival federation published a rule book and a calendar for a rival championship under the title "World Professional Drivers Championship".

=== Proposed World Professional Drivers Championship 1981 Events ===
1. South African GP
2. Long Beach GP
3. Brazilian GP
4. New York GP
5. Italian GP
6. Monaco GP
7. Spanish GP
8. Belgian GP
9. French GP
10. Swedish GP
11. British GP
12. German GP
13. Austrian GP
14. Dutch GP
15. Canadian GP
16. Watkins Glen GP
17. Mexican GP
18. Las Vegas GP

The FOCA teams staged a Formula One race under the WFMS banner in South Africa in February 1981, won by Carlos Reutemann in a Williams-Ford. However, the lack of major factory team attendance, the resulting poor fan support and limited media coverage meant that the viability of the rival series was compromised immediately. A grudging settlement was reached thereafter which allowed the FOCA teams to return to the "FISA" world championship in time for the first race in March.

Things came to a head just before the beginning of the 1982 season. FISA had introduced a clause into the drivers' super licences, stipulating that they must drive for the team they were currently contracted to and no others. The Grand Prix Drivers' Association led by Didier Pironi and Niki Lauda organised a 'drivers' strike' at the 1982 South African Grand Prix in protest, with the majority of the drivers in support (Italian driver Teo Fabi was the only one not to participate in the strike). After lengthy debates and negotiation between the GPDA, FISA and FOCA the dispute was settled in favour of the drivers, and the clause was dropped.

The war culminated in a FOCA boycott of the 1982 San Marino Grand Prix three months later. In theory, all the FOCA-aligned teams were supposed to boycott the Grand Prix as a sign of solidarity and complaint at the handling of the regulations and financial compensation. In practice, four of the teams – Tyrrell, Osella, ATS and Toleman – backed out of the boycott, citing "sponsor obligations". Nonetheless, there were only 14 cars in the race – the six cars from the FISA-aligned Ferrari, Renault and Alfa Romeo teams, and the eight cars from the four FOCA teams that had broken the boycott. The hard feelings and repercussions of the four FOCA teams' participation in the race would continue into the mid-1980s.

== Boycott and water-cooled brakes ==
The FOCA team bosses claimed that their boycott of the 1982 San Marino Grand Prix was in response to the disqualification of Nelson Piquet's Brabham and Keke Rosberg's Williams from the 1982 Brazilian Grand Prix.

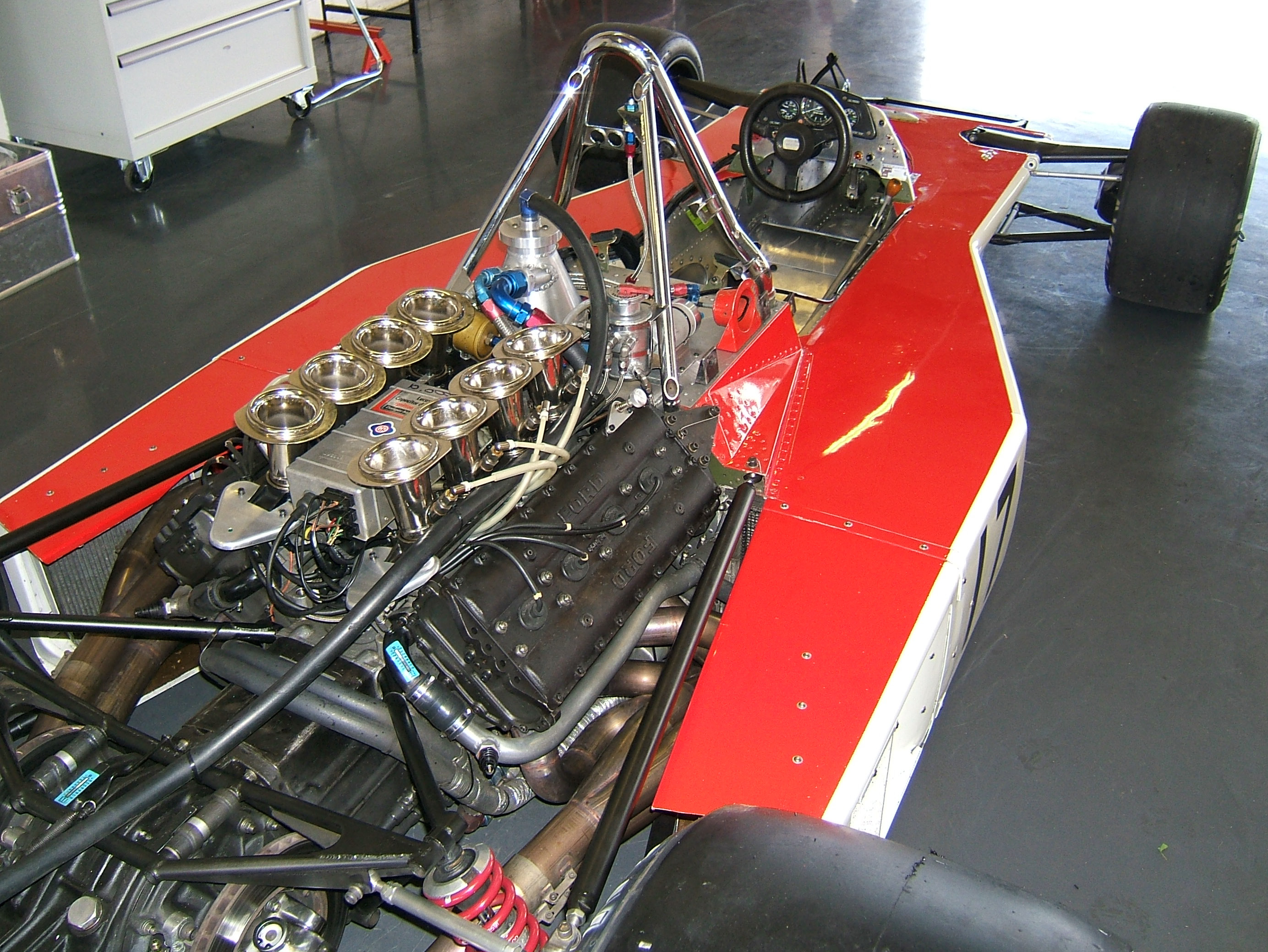
The Ford-Cosworth DFV engine, was used from 1967 to 1985 in Formula One.

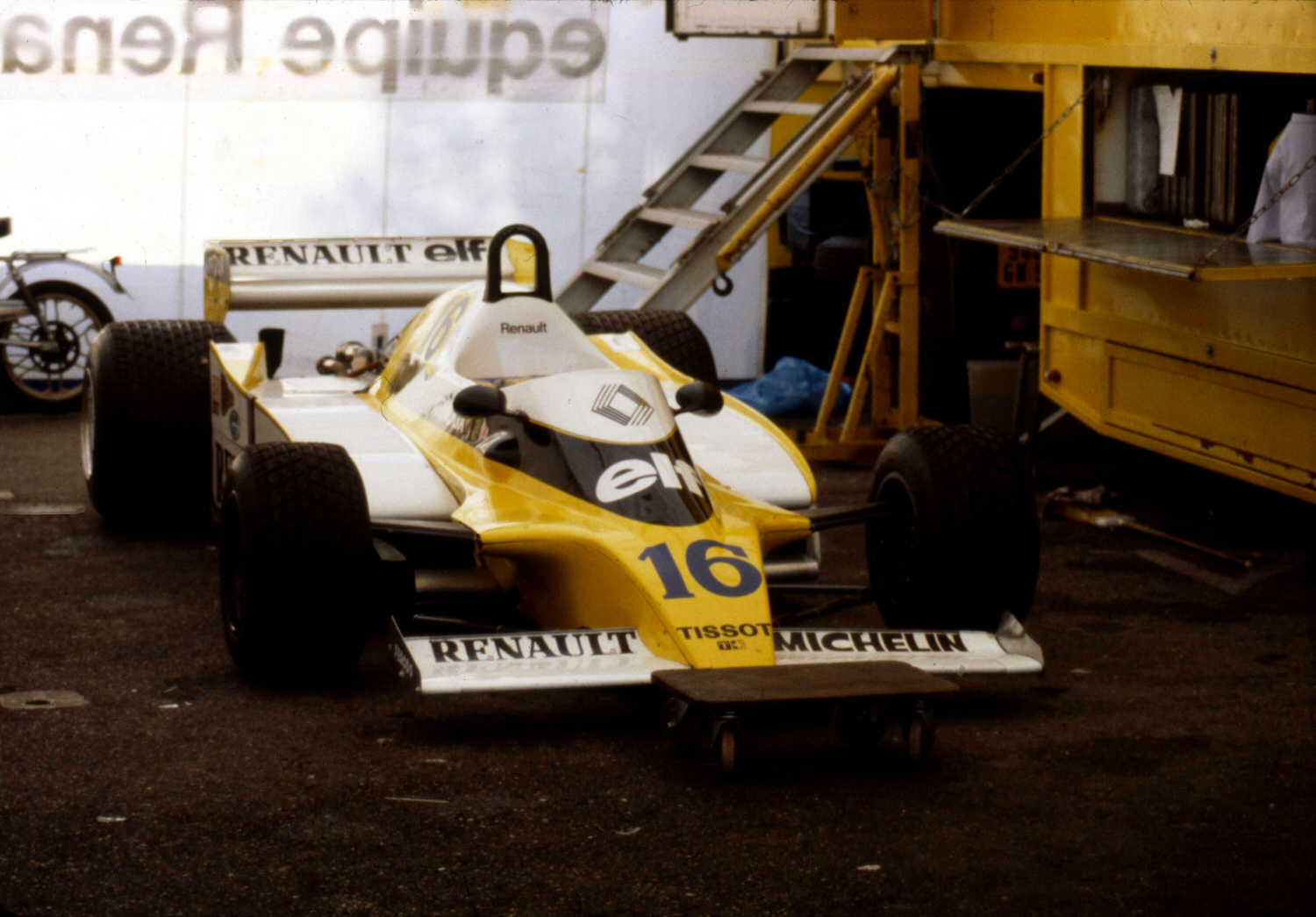
The Renault RS10: the first turbocharged car to win a Grand Prix, in 1979.

This disqualification was a response to the FOCA teams' attempts to overcome their cars' power deficit to the other (mainly manufacturer backed or owned) teams' turbocharged engines. Renault had introduced turbocharged engines to Formula One in 1977. Initially the turbocharged cars had been heavy, unreliable, and difficult to drive, meaning the Ford-Cosworth DFVs used by the majority of the Formula One teams (with Ferrari's Flat 12 engine the notable exception) were still dominant. However, by 1982 turbo engines were becoming faster, more reliable and easier to drive. By this time, Ferrari and later Alfa Romeo (1983) joined Renault in the turbo camp, while even Bernie Ecclestone's Brabham team began using turbocharged BMW engines in 1982. The FOCA teams stuck with the DFV, but even the latest versions of the engine (which had been introduced in 1967) showed their age and were significantly down on power relative to the newest turbo engines. In order to keep pace with the turbo cars, FOCA team bosses began to look for loopholes in the regulations.

Before the Brazilian race, the FOCA teams found a loophole in the weighing procedure used at the races. The rules stated a car would be weighed with all coolants and lubricants on board, and said nothing about whether those coolants and lubricants needed to be in the car when the race finished. The FOCA teams claimed this meant that all coolants and lubricants could be 'topped up' after the race. This practice was illegal in all other forms of FIA racing, but was not explicitly banned in Formula One.

With this in mind, the FOCA teams showed up at the 1982 Brazilian Grand Prix with "water-cooled brakes". The cars were also fitted with large water tanks, which the teams claimed were to hold the water needed to cool the brakes. In reality, the water in the tanks wasn't used for cooling the brakes at all, but was instead sprayed out of the car in the early laps of the race. This resulted in the cars running most of the race significantly under the mandated minimum weight limit. However, after the race (or on occasion during a late race pit stop) the teams refilled the tanks before the cars were weighed. Since the cars were supposed to be weighed with all coolants and lubricants on board, and the water was supposed to be a coolant, this was not a violation of the letter of the rules of Formula One.

In the Brazilian Grand Prix of 1982, the Brabham-Ford/Cosworth of Nelson Piquet and the Williams-Ford/Cosworth of Keke Rosberg finished first and second respectively, with the turbocharged Renault of Alain Prost finishing third (without the water-cooled brakes). Renault immediately protested the top two cars, and Piquet and Rosberg were disqualified for finishing the race underweight. The FISA teams accused the FOCA teams of intentionally mis-interpreting the rule in question, while the FOCA teams claimed since 'topping up' the tanks wasn't specifically illegal, it had to be legal. Brabham and Williams appealed the disqualification of their cars.

As per normal procedure, there was a delay before the FIA Court of Appeals heard the appeal on the disqualifications. This meant another Grand Prix (the United States Grand Prix West) was run before the appeals were heard, and Ferrari (who was aligned with FISA) took the opportunity to show where things would lead if teams were allowed to exploit loopholes in the regulations. Both Ferrari 126C2s showed up at the race with two rear wings. The wings were side by side, with one slightly in front of the other. Both wings were the legal size, but the effect was the same as running one rear wing that was double the legal width. Ferrari claimed this setup was legal, as there was no rule stating teams could only run one rear wing, so running multiple rear wings had to be legal. The FIA disagreed, and disqualified Gilles Villeneuve after he finished 3rd in a Ferrari.

Whether this episode influenced the FIA Court of Appeals or not is unknown, but either way the appeals from Williams and Brabham were rejected, and the disqualifications stood. Ironically, the rest of the FOCA teams' cars in the Brazilian Grand Prix (some of which had scored points) were not disqualified despite the fact they ran the same water-cooled brakes system. The reason was simple: Renault had only protested the cars which had finished in front of their driver (Prost). None of the other cars using the system had been protested, meaning they were allowed to keep their points.

== Rules and breaches ==
During this period, the Formula One rules specified that any car must weigh at least 585 kilograms (1,290 lb) to be deemed in compliance with the rules. The method of testing was somewhat haphazard – teams would be notified that they would be "weight checked" when they exited the pits during practice or qualifying. This gave the teams ample opportunity to add weight to their cars while in the pits so as to pass the test. Former Formula One driver Eddie Cheever claimed that during 1981, when his Tyrrell was tagged for a weight check in qualifying, the team took off the "racing" rear wing (a fiberglass/metal hybrid) and replaced it with a "weight check" rear wing before allowing him to proceed to the scale. Cheever said it took four of them to lift the "weight check" rear wing and the car was largely undriveable with it installed. He believed that the weight check rear wing was made mostly of lead.

Similarly, after the limiting of ground effect technology in Formula One at the end of 1980 the Brabham team devised a system to circumvent the minimum ride height regulation of 6 centimetres. The FISA had implemented this rule in order to make it relatively easy to eliminate ground effect skirts and underwings, both of which required that the bodywork of the car be very close to the racing surface at all times. The Brabham team at the time was headed by Bernie Ecclestone, with legal representation by Max Mosley, and its chief mechanic was Charlie Whiting – all of whom became senior FIA staffers. The team's designer Gordon Murray produced a hydropneumatic suspension system for the Brabham BT49C, in which compressed air acted as the spring. The air springs supported the car at the regulation height for checks while stationary in parc fermé. At speed, where the ride height could not be measured, downforce compressed the suspension and the car settled to a much lower ride height, creating more downforce. It returned to its original height when the car slowed down to enter the pits. Murray believes the system to have been legal on the basis that all suspension systems compress under load. The loophole was in the degree of compression permitted, which was not specified under the rules.

== Concorde Agreement ==
Some elements of the dispute were resolved by the Concorde Agreement to which both parties agreed at the beginning of 1981. The regulatory body (FISA, which was an autonomous satellite body created by the FIA to oversee international motorsport) agreed to a more equal distribution of funds, to arbitration provisions, and to a timetable for technical regulation changes, amongst other things. The teams agreed to appear for every race in the world championship (which had not been the case previously, as to save money, often teams did not enter "fly away" races, i.e. South American, Antipodean, or North American events) under financial penalty. Furthermore, they agreed to abide by the rulings of the arbitration provisions of the agreement. The FOCA teams also agreed to share travel expenses equally amongst all teams who score world championship points in a given season. The initial Concorde Agreement went into effect in 1981 and lasted until 1987. While the Concorde Agreement has been both extended and substantially modified since then, the ten teams contesting the Formula One World Championship in 2019 are still covered under its provisions.

== Repercussions ==
The fallout from the FISA–FOCA war is significant and worthy of mention.

Firstly, the Concorde Agreement hastened the commercial development of the sport. The fact that promoters could guarantee that "all 26" cars (as was the custom) would appear at every race led to increased sponsorships and commercial opportunities. This, in turn, led to a significant increase in financial remuneration to each of the teams (including the non-FOCA teams – the manufacturers).

Secondly, those teams who had backed out of the 1982 San Marino boycott were harshly dealt with. The Tyrrell team was the last team to obtain a turbocharged engine contract (essential in order to be competitive in Formula One from 1983 onward), finally signing a deal to run "customer" Renault turbos in the latter part of 1985 (roughly three years before turbo engines were ultimately banned), having involved in a controversy in the team's final full year without turbo engines (prior to the ban) for using an illegal weight ballast. Toleman was effectively squeezed out of the Formula One world championship in 1985 when their tyre supplier pulled out of Formula One. In both cases, it must be said, the teams had previously blotted their copybook with inappropriate acts. In Tyrrell's case, they had backed out of a 1974 contract to run Renault turbo engines, leading directly to the carmaker's entry into Formula One as a factory team in 1977, while in Toleman's case, they broke a Pirelli tyre contract in favour of Michelin tyres in 1984, only to be left without a contract when Michelin withdrew at the end of 1984. Pirelli, understandably, felt they could not reasonably supply the team in 1985. Goodyear, the other supplier, refused to do so on grounds of capacity. This was resolved before the Monaco Grand Prix in 1985, when Toleman bought the Pirelli contract from the recently closed Spirit team, after signing a long-term sponsorship with Luciano Benetton.

Finally, the entente cordiale between FISA and FOCA led more or less to the inclusion of some of FOCA's principals within the FIA, namely Bernie Ecclestone and Max Mosley. The commercial aspects of Formula One have grown immensely since their involvement in the late 1980s, although the neutrality of the governing bodies and their judgements is still debated by the press and followers of the sport.

== See also ==
- FIA–FOTA dispute, a similar disagreement between the sport's governing body and its participants in 2009.
- FIM–IRTA war, a similar disagreement between Grand Prix motorcycle racing's governing body and its participants in the late 1980s and early 1990s.

== Notes ==
=== Sources ===
- Bower, Tom (2011). No Angel: The Secret Life of Bernie Ecclestone. Faber and Faber. ISBN 978-0-571-26929-7.
- Griffiths, Trevor R. (1997). Grand Prix: The Complete Guide. Third Edition. Bookmart Ltd. ISBN 1-85605-391-1.
- Henry, Alan (1985). Brabham, the Grand Prix Cars. Osprey. ISBN 0-905138-36-8.
