= Formula One Teams Association =

Association of auto racing teams

- The logo of FOTA
- Abbreviation: FOTA
- Formation: 2008
- Dissolved: 2014
- Headquarters: Geneva, Switzerland
- Region served: International

The Formula One Teams Association (FOTA) was a group of Formula One teams that formed at a meeting in Maranello on 29 July 2008. The organisation was formed to give the teams a united voice in negotiations with the FIA and the Formula One Group regarding the future of Formula One. Initially led by Ferrari Chairman Luca di Montezemolo, FOTA's original aim was to negotiate the terms of the new Concorde Agreement, the commercial contract which governs the championship.

A proposed budget cap for the 2010 season led to the FIA–FOTA dispute, which saw a number of Formula One teams rejecting the new regulations and threatening to establish a new racing series. The dispute was resolved with the signing of a revised Concorde Agreement. McLaren Team Principal Martin Whitmarsh, replaced Montezemolo in December 2009, and the group was involved in discussions with the FIA for future Formula One regulations. Four teams pulled out of FOTA at the end of 2011, and the association lost its purpose as the teams came to individual agreements ahead of a new Concorde Agreement in 2013. FOTA was formally dissolved in 2014.

== Budget cap row ==
In May 2009, the FOTA teams announced their intention not to sign up for the 2010 championship until the FIA agreed to change the proposed regulations. FOTA disagreed with several of the proposals, the most contentious being the introduction of a £40m budget cap. With the 29 May deadline approaching the Williams and Force India teams broke ranks, lodged their applications for 2010 and were promptly suspended from FOTA. Following lengthy discussions, on the evening of 18 June 2009, FOTA announced a breakaway "Grand Prix World Championship" series from F1. The WilliamsF1 and Force India teams would not participate in the breakaway series because of their contractual obligation with the FIA. However, on 24 June 2009, FOTA reached agreement with the FIA over the 2010 season rules and ergo dropped their plans for the break-away series.

On 8 July 2009 the eight FOTA teams walked out of a meeting with the FIA to discuss 2010 rules at the Nürburgring. They accused the FIA of putting the sport in jeopardy. A FOTA press release claimed that Charlie Whiting informed them that all eight FOTA teams were not entered in the 2010 championship, even though the FOTA members were included on the "accepted" entry list as endorsed by the FIA World Motor Sport Council and communicated by a FIA press statement on June 24. FOTA tried to postpone the July 8 meeting, this was rejected on the grounds that no new Concorde Agreement would be permitted before a unanimous approval of the 2010 regulations was achieved.

However, it was clear to the FOTA teams that the basis of the 2010 technical and sporting regulations was already established in Paris. As endorsed by the WMSC and clearly stated in the FIA press statement of 24 June "the rules for 2010 onwards will be the 2009 regulations as well as further regulations agreed prior to 29 April 2009". At no point in the Paris discussions was any requirement for unanimous agreement on regulations change expressed.

As a result of these statements, the FOTA representatives at the subsequent Technical Working Group were not able to exercise their rights and therefore had no option other than to terminate their participation.

Nevertheless, the involved parties were able to sign a new Concorde Agreement, agree on resource restrictions and new sporting and technical regulations for the 2010 season at a meeting of the FIA World Motor Sport Council on July 31, 2009. All of the FOTA teams signed the new Concorde Agreement except for BMW Sauber, which had announced its withdrawal from the sport at the end of 2009 two days previously.

On 9 September 2009 FOTA held a meeting in Monza and re-admitted both Williams and Force India into full membership. On 26 November 2009 it was confirmed that the final two "new" teams were to join FOTA, meaning all 12 teams participating in the 2010 Formula One season were members of the organisation. In December 2010, however, Hispania Racing left the organisation. A spokesperson was quoted as citing the politics of the association favouring the larger teams as the reason for the team's departure. However, the FOTA's secretary-general, Simone Perillo, said that the team was expelled because it had not paid its 2010 annual membership fee of €100,000. Red Bull Racing, Scuderia Ferrari and Sauber pulled out of FOTA in early December 2011, with Red Bull's other team, Scuderia Toro Rosso, also exiting the organization.

== Disbanding ==
In February 2014 it was announced that FOTA had been disbanded. The organisation's Secretary General Oliver Weingarten cited a lack of funds and "a lack of consensus among all the teams on a revised, non-contentious mandate" as being the reasons for the dissolving of the organisation.

== Member teams ==
Team	Membership
Brawn GP/Mercedes	2009–2014
BMW Sauber/Sauber	2008–2011
Team Lotus/Caterham F1	2010–2014
Force India	2008–2014
Ferrari	2008–2011
HRT F1	2010
Virgin Racing/Marussia F1	2010–2014
McLaren	2008–2014
Red Bull Racing	2008–2011
Renault/Lotus F1	2008–2014
Toro Rosso	2008–2011
Williams	2008–2014
