= Fédération Internationale de l'Automobile =

International motorsport governing body

- Abbreviation: FIA
- Formation: 20 June 1904; 122 years ago (as AIACR)
- Type: Non-profit
- Legal status: International association
- Purpose: Motorists' issues; Motorsports
- Headquarters: Place de la Concorde
- Location: Paris, France
- Region served: International
- Members: 240 national organisations
- Official language: English; French; Spanish
- President: Mohammed Ben Sulayem
- Main organ: General Assembly
- Affiliations: International Olympic Committee; World Health Organization; Organisation for Economic Co-operation and Development; World Tourism Organization; UN Environment Programme
- Website: fia.com

The Fédération Internationale de l'Automobile (FIA; English: International Automobile Federation) is an international organisation with two primary functions surrounding use of the automobile. Its mobility division advocates the interests of motoring organisations, the automotive industry and motor car users in the fields of road safety and traffic circulation. The sport division is a governing body for many international motorsport championships and disciplines, including Formula One.

The FIA was formally established on 20 June 1904. It is headquartered at 8 Place de la Concorde, Paris, with offices in Geneva, Valleiry and London. The FIA consists of 245 member organisations in 149 countries worldwide. As of 2026, its president is Mohammed Ben Sulayem. The FIA is generally known by its French name or initials, even in non-French-speaking countries, but is occasionally rendered as the International Automobile Federation.

Its most prominent role is in the licensing and sanctioning of Formula One, World Rally Championship, World Endurance Championship, TCR World Tour, World Rallycross Championship, Formula E, and various other forms of racing. The FIA along with the Fédération Internationale de Motocyclisme (FIM) also certify land speed record attempts. The International Olympic Committee provisionally recognised the federation in 2011, and granted full recognition in 2013.

== History ==
The Association Internationale des Automobile Clubs Reconnus (AIACR, English: 'International Association of Recognized Automobile Clubs') was founded in Paris on 20 June 1904, as an association of national motor clubs. The association was designed to represent the interests of motor car users, as well as to oversee the burgeoning international motor sport scene.

In 1922, the AIACR established the Commission Sportive Internationale (CSI), which would oversee international motorsport matters, such as setting the regulations for Grand Prix motor racing. Previously, this responsibility had been entrusted to the sporting commission of the Automobile Club de France. The World Manufacturers' Championship was introduced in 1925, replaced by the European Drivers' Championship in 1931 with a title awarded to the driver with the best results in the selected Grands Prix.

Upon resumption of motorsport after the Second World War, the AIACR was renamed the Fédération Internationale de l'Automobile. The FIA established a number of championships in the following years; the World Championship for Drivers in 1950, and the World Championship for Sports Cars in 1953. That same year it also established the European Rally Championship, and then in 1963, the European Touring Car Challenge.

In 1962, the FIA created the Commission Internationale de Karting (CIK, also CIK-FIA), to oversee the growing karting discipline at international level, with a Nations Cup organised in the first year.

In 1978, Jean-Marie Balestre begun his presidency of the CSI, and it was renamed to Fédération Internationale du Sport Automobile (FISA), with the intention of creating a governing body for automobile motor sport with some autonomy from the rest of the FIA, which retained control of the karting commission, CIK. Balestre believed motor sport was not being managed well and wanted to professionalise and commercialise the sport, particularly in Formula One which led to a dispute with participants known as the FISA–FOCA war. Balestre later took presidency of the FIA in 1985, managing presidencies of both federations simultaneously. He lost the FISA presidency in 1991, and the FIA presidency in 1993, to Max Mosley on both occasions. It was clear to both Balestre and Mosley, and agreed by the FIA General Assembly upon proposition that there was no need for two federations, and subsequent to Mosley's FIA election, FISA was abolished in structural changes, bringing all motorsport under the control of the World Motor Sport Council.

In 1998, amidst the European Commission investigation, the FIA moved its headquarters to Geneva, Switzerland, outside the jurisdiction of the commission. In 2001, the FIA moved back to Paris following the settlement however it retains its office in Geneva.

Also in 1998, the karting commission (CIK) gained some independence, becoming known as the Fédération Mondial de Karting (FMK, also known as FMK-FIA and distinct from separate organisations International Kart Federation and World Karting Association). However the Federation was short lived and in 2000, reverted to being known as the CIK.

The FIA announced in 2022 the appointment of its first ever CEO, Natalie Robyn. Robyn resigned the position after 18 months and as of August 2024 the position remains vacant.

== Organisational structure ==
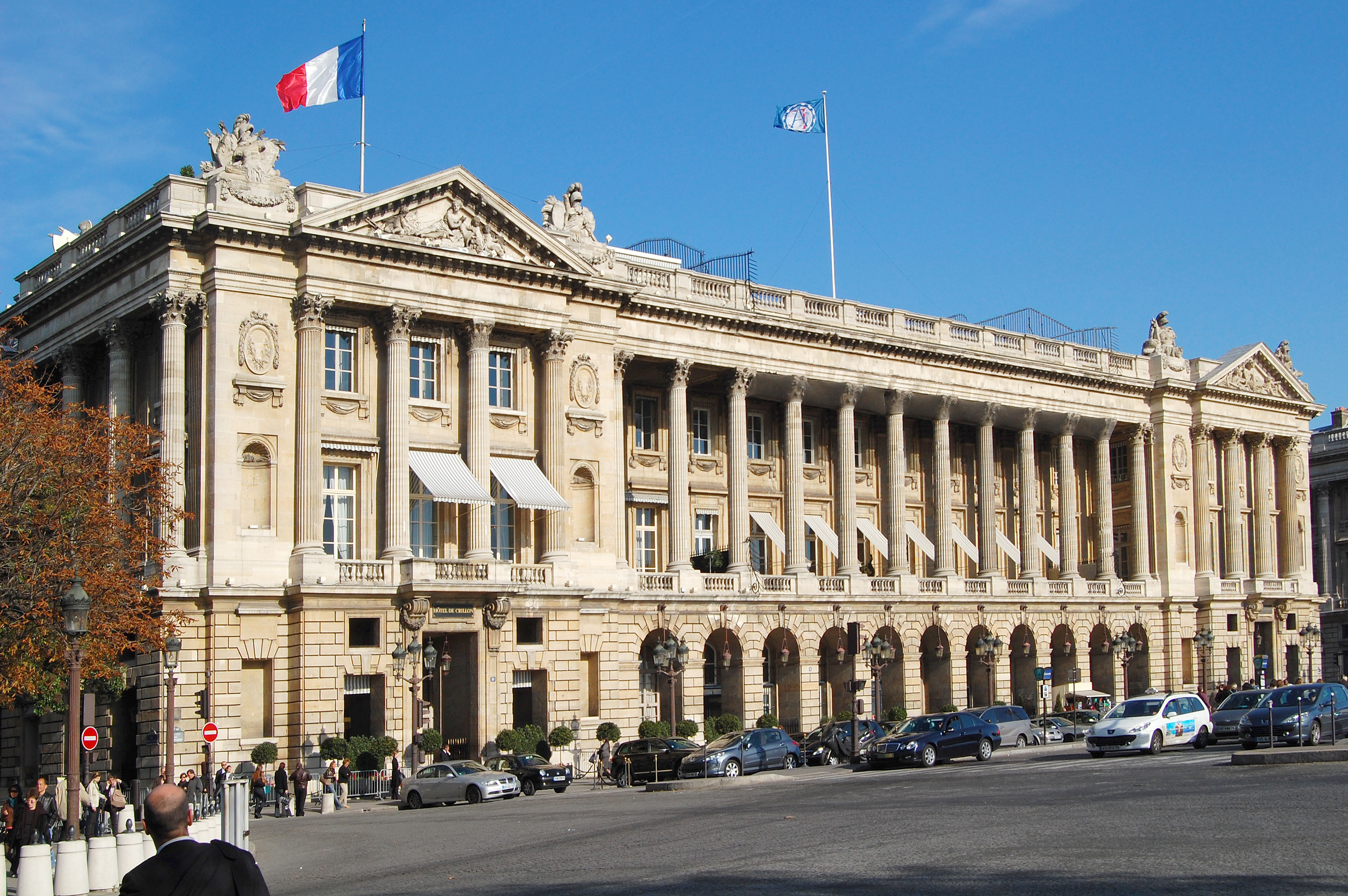
Headquarters of the FIA at the Place de la Concorde

=== General Assembly ===
The General Assembly is the Federation's supreme governing body, consisting of representatives from each of the FIA's member associations. According to the FIA's website, the voting member associations can be automobile and touring clubs (mobility), or national sporting authorities (sport). The website further states that there are 243 organisations spread among 147 countries.

Meetings of the General Assembly are usually held once a year, though extraordinary meetings can be convened for urgent matters. The General Assembly has responsibility for amending the FIA's statutes and regulations, approving the annual budget and reports, deciding upon the membership, and electing the officers and members to the Federation's governing bodies.

=== Presidency ===
The head of the FIA and chairman of the General Assembly is the President, a position held by Mohammed bin Sulayem since 2021. The President coordinates the activities of the Federation and proposes resolutions to the various commissions and committees and also acts as the representative of the FIA to external organisations. They are supported by two Deputy Presidents and several vice-presidents, each for Sport or Mobility, as well as the President of the FIA Senate. The combined presidency is elected to a four-year term by the General Assembly. Presidential candidates must produce an electoral list consisting of their proposed Deputy Presidents, vice-presidents for Sport, and the President of the Senate, as well as demonstrate support from a number of member clubs.

FIA Presidents
Association Internationale des Automobile Clubs Reconnus (AIACR)
Term	President	Nationality
1904–1931	Étienne van Zuylen van Nyevelt	Belgium
1931–1936	Robert de Vogüé	France
1936–1946	Jehan de Rohan-Chabot	France
Fédération Internationale de l'Automobile (FIA)
Term	President	Nationality
1946–1958	Jehan de Rohan-Chabot	France
1958–1963	Hadelin de Liedekerke-Beaufort	Belgium
1963–1965	Filippo Caracciolo	Italy
1965–1971	Wilfred Andrews	United Kingdom
1971–1975	Amaury de Merode	Belgium
1975–1985	Paul Alfons von Metternich-Winneburg	Austria
1985–1993	Jean-Marie Balestre	France
1993–2009	Max Mosley	United Kingdom
2009–2021	Jean Todt	France
2021–present	Mohammed Ben Sulayem	United Arab Emirates

FIA Deputy Presidents for Sport
Term	Deputy President	Nationality
Deputises the FIA President as Chair of the World Motor Sport Council
1993–1997	Alfredo César Torres	Portugal
1998–2008	Marco Piccinini	Italy
2009–2021	Graham Stoker	United Kingdom
2021–2025	Robert Reid	United Kingdom
2025–	Malcolm Wilson	United Kingdom

=== World Councils ===
The FIA has two World Councils. The World Council for Automobile Mobility and Tourism (WCAMT) governs transport policy, road safety, tourism and environmental concerns. The World Motor Sport Council (WMSC) regulates all sporting disciplines claimed by the FIA, and approves the regulations for each of the FIA's championships. Beneath the WMSC are a number of specialised commissions, which are either focused on individual championships, or general areas such as safety.

=== Senate ===
The FIA Senate generally oversees financial and commercial affairs and general management of the FIA, and can take decisions required between meetings of the relevant committee or World Council.

=== Administration ===
Sport and Mobility each have a Secretary General to head the administrative staff who function as intermediaries for the councils, commissions and committees. A Chief Administration Officer also heads areas supporting the Senate such as commercial, legal, marketing, events and financial.

=== Commissions ===
A number of commissions exist to further activities or aims within specific areas. Each may have their own presidency and could be broken down into further specific working groups. Individual members may be from member organisations joined by delegates and representatives from various professions or through a related connection such as being a motorsport competitor for example. Alongside the various Sporting and Mobility Commissions, the International Historical Commission exists for the preservation of historic vehicles.

=== Committees ===
Ten sports committees have been established by the World Motorsport Council to help manage and administer certain aspects of motorsport. An Ethics committee was also set up in 2012 by the General Assembly.

=== Judiciary ===
The FIA's judicial bodies include the International Tribunal, which exercises disciplinary powers that are not dealt with by the meeting stewards, and the International Court of Appeal. The ICA is the final appeal tribunal for international motor sport, which resolves disputes brought before it by National Sporting Authorities worldwide, or by the President of the FIA. It can also settle non-sporting disputes brought by national motoring organisations affiliated to the FIA.

== Sporting governance ==
=== FIA World Motor Sport Council ===
The World Motor Sport Council (WMSC) has the decision-making responsibility for all motorsport the FIA governs and sanctions. It convenes at least three times a year to decide on rules and regulations proposed to it by the commissions and committees that have direct responsibility of the various disciplines and championships. The WMSC also discusses safety and development of motor sport and steers the commissions and committees through delegated tasks. The council consists of the President of the FIA, the Deputy President for Sport and seven vice-presidents as nominated by the President; five members by right and fourteen further members approved by the General Assembly.

==== World Championship Commissions ====
Each of the seven World Championships report directly to the WMSC, usually to propose amendments to their own rules and regulations.

==== WMSC Committees ====
Alongside the Manufacturer's Committee, nine sporting committees report to the WMSC. The committees, shown below in bold, may have their own specialised commissions.

- **Single seater**
- **Circuit sport**
  - Drag racing
  - Drifting
  - Truck racing
  - GT
  - Touring car
  - Electric and new energy championships
  - Esports
- **Historic motorsport**
- **Road sport**
  - Rally
  - Cross-country rally
  - Land speed records
  - Hill climb
  - Off-road
- **Sport member clubs**
  - Volunteers and officials
- **Drivers**
- **Sustainability and D&I**
  - Sport, environment and sustainability
  - Sport disability and accessibility
  - Women in motorsport
- **Homologation regulations**
- **Technical and safety**
  - Circuits
  - Closed road
  - Medical

=== 2022 ban of Russian and Belarusian teams and competitions ===
In response to the 2022 Russian invasion of Ukraine, the FIA banned Russia and Belarus teams, and banned the holding of competitions in Russia or Belarus. It also excluded Russian and Belarusian FIA members from their roles as elected officers or commission members, and banned FIA grants to Russian and Belarusian members. Individual Russia and Belarus competitors were allowed to enter races as neutrals, without their national symbols, flags, colours and anthems. The FIA cancelled the 2022 edition of the Russian Grand Prix in Sochi, initially scheduled for 25 September. The FIA also terminated the Russian contract to host the race.

=== FIA World Championships ===
The true history of Formula One began in the 1946 season with the Fédération Internationale de l'Automobile's (FIA's) standardisation of rules for Formula One cars in Grand Prix racing. The first Grand Prix in accordance with this new regulations was the 1946 Turin Grand Prix. Then in the 1950 season, the FIA organised the first World Championship for Drivers. From the 1958 season, a World Constructors' Championship title was introduced, named from the 1958 season to the 1980 season officially as the International Cup for Formula One Constructors. Formula One originated from the World Manufacturers' Championship (1925–1930) and European Drivers' Championship (1931–1939) which were organised by the AIACR (The Association Internationale des Automobile Clubs Reconnus).

The World Sportscar Championship was created in the 1953 season, and was the first world championship for sports cars in endurance racing. The official name of the championship frequently varied throughout the period and from the 1962 season to the 1971 season the championship was officially known as the International Championship. The championship was solely for manufacturers up to the 1981 season when a Drivers Championship title was introduced. From the 1953 season to the 1984 season, titles were awarded to manufacturers of sports cars belonging to two main categories: sports prototypes (except for the 1978 to 1981 seasons) and GT cars (except for the 1953 to 1961 seasons and the 1982 season). From the 1985 season to the 1992 season, titles were awarded only to teams entering sports prototypes (instead of manufacturers of sports prototypes), excluding teams entering GT cars. After the 1992 season the World Sportscar Championship was cancelled and dissolved, revived again in the 2012 season under the new name as the FIA World Endurance Championship.

In the 1973 season, the FIA organised the first World Rally Championship beginning with the 42nd Rally of Monte-Carlo to replace the International Championship for Manufacturers. Initially the championship was solely for manufacturers. In the 1977 and 1978 seasons, an FIA Cup for Drivers was included before a Driver's Championship title was introduced in the 1979 season.

In the 1987 season, the FIA sanctioned the World Touring Car Championship. Initially a one-off series for touring car racing, the title was revived in the 2005 season and discontinued at the end of the 2017 season.

In the 2010 season, the SRO Group introduced the FIA GT1 World Championship, which was a championship consisting of one-hour sprint races for GT cars. This world championship ended in the 2012 season. After a switch to GT3 cars in 2012 the series became known as the FIA GT Series in the 2013 season.

After the Automobile Club de l'Ouest (ACO) successfully organised the Intercontinental Le Mans Cup (ILMC) in the 2010 and 2011 seasons, the FIA and ACO organised together the rebirth of the defunct World Sportscar Championship (which was cancelled after the 1992 season) for both sports prototypes and GT cars from the 2012 season onward, now officially known as the FIA World Endurance Championship (WEC).

Starting in 2022 season, the FIA and FIM jointly sanctioned the World Rally-Raid Championship. With the Amaury Sport Organization (ASO) acting as promoter and organiser; the separate cross-country rallying series sanctioned by the FIA and FIM were dissolved and merged into the new World Championship.

Key: Constructor/manufacturer = The person or corporate entity that owns the intellectual rights to the chassis and the engine of the car that a team/entrant enters into a competition.; Team/entrant = The person or corporate entity that registers a car and driver for a competition, and is then responsible for preparing and maintaining that car for the duration of the competition.

World Championship	Driver's title	Constructor/manufacturer's title	Team/entrant's title
**Current**
Formula One World Championship	1950–	1958– (Note: In 1958 - 1980 officially as the International Cup.)	–
Karting World Championship	1964–	–	–
World Rally Championship	1979–	1973–	–
World Endurance Championship (Note: A revival of the defunct World Sportscar Championship which ended in 1992.)	2012–	2012–	2018–
World Rallycross Championship	2014–	–	2014–
Formula E World Championship	2020–	2023–	2020–
World Rally-Raid Championship	2022–	2022–	–
**Former**
World Manufacturers' Championship (Note: Organised by the AIACR (The Association Internationale des Automobile Clubs Reconnus).)	–	1925–1927 (Note: The championship was officially cancelled in 1930, but in 1928–1930 no titles were awarded.)	–
World Sportscar Championship (Note: The official name frequently varied throughout the period. In 1962–1971 as the International Championship. Revived in 2012 as the World Endurance Championship.)	1981–1992	1953–1984	1985–1992
World Touring Car Championship	1987, 2005–2017	2005–2017	1987
GT1 World Championship	2010–2012	–	2010–2012

=== Esports ===
In 2024, the FIA approved the inclusion of an esports appendix into its International Sporting Code, formally codifying the organisation's authority over automobile sport based video game and simulator competitions. Although the FIA had approved of and had been associated with esports competitions previously, the first fully-sanctioned FIA championship of its kind was organised for November 2025, formed of sim racing events using Gran Turismo 7.

== Mobility and tourism ==
=== Carnet de Passages en Douane ===
In 1913, the AIACR created the Carnet de Passages en Douane (CPD), allowing motorists to cross international borders into signatory territories for temporary periods without customs tariffs, duties or taxes payable on their personal vehicles. The CPD works like an insurance product, customs are guaranteed to be paid by the issuer if the vehicle does not leave the country within the specified time. Under the terms of the United Nations Customs Convention, only the FIA and the Alliance Internationale de Tourisme (AIT) may authorise carnet issuers.

=== NCAP Programmes ===
The FIA was a founder member of the European New Car Assessment Programme, a car safety programme that crash-tests new models and publishes safety reports on vehicles. Mosley was the first chairman of the organisation. The FIA later helped establish the Latin NCAP, ASEAN NCAP and Global NCAP.

== Initiatives ==
=== FIA Foundation ===
The FIA Foundation was established in 2001 as the FIA's charitable arm. (Note: Founded as the FIA Foundation for the Automobile and Society) A registered charity in the United Kingdom, the foundation received a US$300 million grant from the sale of Formula One's rights to fund research into road safety, the environmental impact of motoring, and to support sustainable motoring. The Make Roads Safe campaign was set up in 2006 by the FIA Foundation, targeting the creation of safe roads across the world.

Critics see it as a tool of the motor industry to increase the acceptability of car-based traffic solutions while blocking alternatives.

=== Sport ===
Following the 1994 San Marino Grand Prix, which saw the deaths of Ayrton Senna and Roland Ratzenberger, the FIA formed an Expert Advisory Safety Committee to research and improve safety in motor racing. Chaired by Formula One medical chief Professor Sid Watkins, the committee worked with the Motor Industry Research Association to strengthen the crash resistance of cars and the restraint systems and to improve drivers' personal safety. The recommendations of the committee led to significantly more stringent crash tests for racing vehicles, new safety standards for helmets and race suits, and the eventual introduction of the HANS device as compulsory in all international racing series. The committee also worked on improving circuit safety. This led to a number of changes at motor racing circuits around the world, and the improvement of crash barriers and trackside medical procedures.

==== FIA Institute ====
The FIA Institute for Motor Sport Safety was established in 2004 with the focus of improving safety in motor sport, bringing together the various safety research groups into one organisation. It ceased prior to the 2017 motor sport season, with the Global Institute for Motor Sport Safety taking on its aims.

The FIA Institute Young Driver Excellence Academy begun in 2011 with the aim of developing driver talent worldwide. It ceased functioning after the 2015 season.

== Controversies ==
=== Formula One ===
==== FISA–FOCA war (1970s—1980s) ====
The CSI determined the regulations and calendar of the major international championships, such as the Formula One World Championship, World Sportscar Championship and European Rally Championship. Meanwhile, the organisers of the individual races (for example local or national clubs) were responsible for accepting entries, paying prize money, and the general running of each event. In Formula One, this led to tension between the teams, which formed themselves into the Formula One Constructors Association (FOCA) founded in 1974, event organisers and the CSI. The FIA and CSI were largely amateur organisations, and FOCA under the control of Bernie Ecclestone began to take charge of various aspects of organising the events, as well as setting terms with race organisers for the arrival of teams and the amount of prize money. This led to the FIA President Prince Metternich attempting to reassert its authority by appointing Jean-Marie Balestre as the head of the CSI in 1978, who promptly reformed the committee into the autonomous Fédération Internationale du Sport Automobile (FISA).

Under Balestre's leadership FISA and the manufacturer-backed teams became involved in a dispute with FOCA (named the "FISA–FOCA war"). The conflict saw several races being cancelled or boycotted, and large-scale disagreement over the technical regulations and their enforcement. The dispute and the Concorde Agreement that was written to end it, would have significant ramifications for the FIA. The agreement led to FOCA acquiring commercial rights over Formula One, while FISA and the FIA would have control over sport's regulations. FOCA chief Bernie Ecclestone became an FIA Vice-president with control over promoting the FIA's World Championships, while FOCA legal advisor and former March Engineering manager Max Mosley would end up becoming FISA President in 1991. Mosley succeeded Balestre as President of the FIA in 1993 and restructured the organisation, dissolving FISA and placing motor racing under the direct management of the FIA.

==== Breakaway series (2000s) ====
During the 2000s, the FIA and its president became increasingly embroiled in controversy over Formula One, while facing threats from teams to establish a breakaway series. A grouping of the car manufacturers involved in F1, the Grand Prix Manufacturers Association, proposed a new world championship, which would allow them greater control over the regulations and revenue distribution. A new Concorde Agreement eventually ended the threat, but the breakaway series would resurface during each dispute between the FIA, teams and the Formula One Group. The FIA's handling of the tyre situation at the 2005 United States Grand Prix was criticised. Mosley had refused any modification to the circuit or the holding of a non-championship event in place of the Grand Prix, having stated that running on an untested circuit was unsafe. The FIA also threatened to punish the teams who withdrew from the event, but later cleared the teams of any wrongdoing.

==== 2007 Formula One espionage ====
In 2007 and 2008 the FIA was criticised on two issues. The 2007 Formula One espionage controversy involved accusations against McLaren, who were accused of stealing technological secrets from Ferrari. Commenting on how the FIA handled the situation, Martin Brundle wrote a column in The Sunday Times titled "Witch-hunt threatens to spoil world title race" in which he accused the FIA of a witch-hunt against McLaren. The World Motor Sport Council responded by issuing a writ against The Sunday Times alleging libel. Brundle responded by saying "I have earned the right to have an opinion", and suggested the writ was a "warning sign to other journalists".

==== FIA–FOTA war (2000s—2010s) ====
The FIA–FOTA dispute was a series of clashes between the FIA and the now defunct Formula One Teams Association (FOTA) over proposed changes to the rules and regulations for the 2010 Formula One season. The debate began over the introduction of a budget cap and escalated until the eve of the 2009 British Grand Prix with the FOTA teams announcing their intention to form their own rival breakaway series. The FIA in response began an entry process for new teams. From that point onwards, the dispute was negotiated to the point at which a new Concorde Agreement was signed in August 2009, with the budget cap replaced by a series of cost-cutting measures.

=== European Commission investigation ===
The Competition Directorate of the European Commission and the FIA were involved in a dispute over the commercial administration of motorsport during the 1990s. The Competition Commissioner, Karel Van Miert had received a number of complaints from television companies and motorsport promoters in 1997 that the FIA had been abusing its position as motorsport's governing body. Van Miert's initial inquiry had not concluded by 1999, which resulted in the FIA suing the European Commission, alleging that the delay was causing damaging uncertainty, and successfully receiving an apology from the Commission over the leaking of documents relating to the case. Mario Monti took over as Commissioner in 1999, and the European Commission opened a formal investigation into the FIA. The Commission alleged a number of breaches of European competition law, centred around the FIA's administration of licences required to participate in motorsport and the control of television rights of the motorsport events it authorised. In order to compete in events the FIA authorised, the competitor had to apply for a licence, which prohibited licensees from entering a series not controlled by the FIA. This provision, which also applied to racing circuits and promoters, prevented rival championships competing against the FIA championships by restricting their access to facilities, drivers, and vehicle manufacturers. In addition, the FIA also claimed the television rights to all international motorsport events, which were then transferred to International Sportsworld Communicators, a company controlled by Ecclestone. This meant organisers were forced into having their championships promoted by the same company that managed the affairs of other motorsport events, a potential conflict of interest. The combination of these requirements meant Ecclestone's Formula One Administration, which now controlled Formula One's commercial rights, was protected from competition from any rival championships.

The investigation was closed in 2001 after the FIA and FOA agreed to a number of conditions. In order to fairly regulate all international motorsport, the FIA agreed to limit its role to that of a sporting regulator, and would sell the commercial rights to its championships, including Formula One. This was to prevent a conflict of interest between the FIA's regulatory role and any commercial advantages it may gain from the success of certain championships. The FIA could no longer prevent non-FIA administered events from being established, neither could it use its powers to prevent competition to Formula One. Ecclestone and FOA would no longer handle the commercial rights to other motorsport events outside of Formula One. Ecclestone had sold the ISC company, which now only controlled the rights to rallying, and would stand down from his role as an FIA Vice-president. As a result of this ruling, the FIA sold the commercial rights to Formula One to the Formula One Group for 100 years for $360 million.

=== Max Mosley sex scandal ===
In 2008, accusations surfaced in the British media that FIA president Max Mosley was involved in scandalous sexual behaviour. In response, Mosley faced a leadership challenge in a vote of confidence at the June 2008 General Assembly. Mosley won the vote by 103 votes in support to 55 against, resulting in the retention of Mosley as president. However he continued to face criticism from several motoring clubs and motorsport figures. Germany's ADAC (the largest European FIA member), announced, "We view with regret and incredulity the FIA general assembly's decision in Paris, confirming Max Mosley in office as FIA president". It froze all its activities with the FIA until Mosley left office.

== See also ==
- FIA Prize Giving Ceremony
- List of FIA championships
- List of FIA member organisations
- FIA Motorsport Games
- FIA Hall of Fame
- FIA Institute Young Driver Excellence Academy
- Fédération Internationale des Véhicules Anciens
- Commission Internationale de Karting
