= Formula One Constructors' Association =

1970s and 1980s organisation

- Abbreviation: FOCA
- Formation: 1974
- Chief Executive: Bernie Ecclestone (1978–)

The Formula One Constructors' Association (FOCA) was an organization of the chassis builders (constructors) who design and build the cars that race in the FIA Formula One World Championship. It evolved from the earlier Formula 1 Constructors Association (F1CA; the name was changed due to unfortunate connotations in some languages) and came to be dominated by Bernie Ecclestone and Max Mosley (originally a co-founder of March Engineering). Frank Williams, Colin Chapman, Teddy Mayer, Ken Tyrrell were also significant members. FOCA served to represent the interests of their privately owned teams – usually against the race organisers and later against the manufacturer-owned or supported teams such as Ferrari, Matra and Alfa Romeo. Ecclestone became the organisation's chief executive in 1978, with Mosley taking on the role of legal advisor.

In the early 1980s, the organization fell out with the sport's governing body – the FISA. The eventual resolution of this conflict saw Ecclestone take a more significant role in the running of the sport with the formation of FOA (Formula One Administration).

Following the disqualification of Nelson Piquet and Keke Rosberg from the 1982 Brazilian Grand Prix, numerous FOCA-aligned teams including McLaren, Williams and Brabham boycotted the San Marino Grand Prix. Four FOCA-aligned teams – Tyrrell, Osella, ATS and Toleman – broke their stated boycott and started the race anyway.

== See also ==
- FISA–FOCA war
- Formula One Teams Association
- FIA–FOTA dispute
