= Stefan Grand Prix =

Proposed Formula One team from Serbia

- Founder(s): Zoran Stefanović

Formula One World Championship career
- Races entered: 0
- Constructors' Championships: 0
- Drivers' Championships: 0
- Race victories: 0
- Podiums: 0
- Points: 0
- Pole positions: 0
- Fastest laps: 0

Stefan Grand Prix was a proposed Serbian Formula One team named after its creator, Zoran Stefanović. The team was attempting to compete in the 2010 Formula One World Championship. Its initial application was one of those rejected in July 2009 and although the team persisted in its attempts to gain an entry, it did not appear on the final entry list published in March 2010. The team also applied unsuccessfully to compete in the 2011 and 2015 seasons.

== Origins ==
Stefan Grand Prix was founded by Serbian-born engineer and businessman Zoran Stefanović, with hopes of becoming Serbia's first Formula One team. Stefanović and Stefan Grand Prix had attempted to enter Formula One on two previous occasions; once in 1996. and again one year later with an attempt to purchase the remains of Lola's abortive 1997 entry.

== Disputed entry ==
In 2009, Formula One's governing body, the FIA, opened applications for new teams to join the 2010 grid. Applications from fifteen new teams were received, with three (Campos Meta (later to be renamed Hispania Racing), Manor Grand Prix (later to be renamed Virgin Racing) and Team USF1) being selected in July 2009 to join the existing ten teams for 2010. Stefan GP was one of the unsuccessful applicants. The Formula One community was first made aware of Stefanović's ambitions after he filed a complaint with the European Commission, of a similar nature to one submitted by N.Technology.

Stefanović claimed that the entry selection process had been biased in favour of teams who had nominated to run the Cosworth engines that were being introduced for 2010. He claimed that the FIA had not simply shown bias against non-Cosworth teams, but also against teams which would be classified as manufacturers, citing that new teams Virgin Racing, Campos and USF1 had planned to outsource the design of their chassis to other firms and design studios, whereas Stefan Grand Prix had the support of Serbian company AMCO, and thus could build its own cars independently. This bias, he claimed, was supported by Prodrive's failure to make the grid; like Stefan, Prodrive would have the facilities to build its own chassis. Stefanović also had the support of Mike Coughlan, the disgraced McLaren engineer. The team has released photographs showing Coughlan in its offices.

In November 2009, Toyota officially backed out of the championship, following a manufacturer exodus led by Honda and BMW. Despite initial plans not to sell the team on, Stefanović acquired the rights to use the team's chassis, gearbox and the 2010 spec engine. It also employed several former Toyota team members, then out of work after being made redundant by Toyota. With the vacancy left by Toyota, the FIA moved to fill the thirteenth and final grid position, which was contested between Stefanović and Peter Sauber, after BMW sold the team back to him. Sauber was eventually accepted to the grid. Stefanović was later reported as pursuing a 2010 grid position despite the thirteenth grid position having been awarded to Sauber.

== Entry bids ==
=== 2010 ===
On 29 September 2009, Stefanović announced his plans to compete in the first round of the 2010 season, in Bahrain, despite not having an entry for the 2010 season, and the Concorde Agreement only allowing for the presence of thirteen teams on the grid. Further opportunities to enter the sport in 2010 arose when manufacturer teams BMW Sauber and Toyota withdrew their entries. On 3 March 2010, the FIA announced that USF1 "[would] not be in a position to participate in the 2010 FIA Formula One World Championship" and that it would be impossible to add a new team to the grid less than two weeks before the opening race of the season. Zoran Stefanović was reported as attempting to merge USF1 with Stefan Grand Prix, though the plan failed after meeting with resistance from USF1 founders Peter Windsor and Ken Anderson.

The team planned to include a young driver program that would allow rookie drivers testing time on behalf of the teams they sign for; as Stefan would be immune to the ban on in-season testing as it had not been accepted to the 2010 grid. On 29 January the team confirmed that it would be receiving technical support from Toyota, and that it was still pushing in its efforts to join the grid for 2010 just six weeks before the first race of the season.

Despite not having an entry, the team had sent its equipment to the Bahrain International Circuit in preparation for the 2010 Bahrain Grand Prix. The team also planned to test its car over three days at Autódromo Internacional do Algarve on February 25–28 with two drivers, but this was cancelled as the team could not secure a tyre supply. Formula One's sole tyre supplier, Bridgestone, would not supply F1-specification tyres to Stefan until the team acquired an entry.

Formula One's commercial rights holder Bernie Ecclestone mentioned that he had spoken to Mirko Cvetković, the then-Prime Minister of Serbia, and that he was confident that Stefan had the funding required for F1. Three weeks later, the team announced that the partnership with Toyota Motorsport had ended because it was not feasible to continue for an entry for 2010. However, it did not rule out the possibility of the partnership being re-established for 2011. In April, Stefanović announced that in addition to applying to enter the 2011 season, he was also planning to build the "Stefan Technology Park", which included a Formula One-standard circuit, in Stara Pazova.

=== 2011 ===
Following the withdrawal of USF1 from the 2010 season, the FIA announced that it would re-open the selection process for 2011. Stefan Grand Prix was one, out of fifteen, organisations to submit an entry to the FIA. In the week before the 2010 Italian Grand Prix, the FIA announced that none of the prospective entrants met the minimum funding or engineering requirements, leaving the thirteenth grid slot vacant.

=== 2015 ===
The bid process was not re-opened for the 2012 season. In March 2014, it was revealed that Stefanović had again lodged an application to join the Formula One grid after the FIA had announced earlier that the entry process would be reopened with the intent of new team joining the grid starting with the 2015 Formula One season. Stefanović withdrew the application in February 2014.

=== 2019 ===
In July 2017, Stefanović revealed a new plan to enter the series from the 2019 season, stating that he had a facility in Parma and personnel ready to set up a team. The statement of intent came two weeks after rumours surrounding the entry of a Chinese team for the 2019 season became public.

== Car and drivers ==
The team's Toyota-designed and built car was to have been designated the Stefan S-01 and its engine the Stefan RG-01, both of which would have been serviced by Toyota. On 2 February 2010, the team announced its intention to launch and test the car later that month, with Kazuki Nakajima as a driver. The S-01, liveried in national Serbian red, was fired up for the first time on 19 February. The team had intended to launch and test its car on 25 February regardless of whether or not its application to the grid was successful, and had been pushing for entry as a fourteenth team. The team was unable to acquire tyres from official supplier Bridgestone, and so was forced to cancel its Portimão test and launch. The team later announced that it was planning to launch the car sometime in early March and to test it with Avon tyres rather than Bridgestones. The team had signed Kazuki Nakajima, whose career had been supported by Toyota, as its first driver. Stefanović also hoped to sign 1997 champion Jacques Villeneuve and Pastor Maldonado as its reserve driver. The collapse of the team ended these plans.
