= FIA–FOTA dispute =

Political clashes in Formula One World Championship

The FIA–FOTA dispute was a series of political clashes between the Fédération Internationale de l'Automobile (FIA) and the now defunct Formula One Teams Association (FOTA) over proposed changes to the rules and regulations for the 2010 Formula One season. The debate began over the introduction of a budget cap and culminated on the eve of the 2009 British Grand Prix with the FOTA teams announcing their intention to form their own rival breakaway series. From that point onwards, the dispute was eased to the point at which a new Concorde Agreement was signed in August 2009.

== Introduction and pre-history ==
The origins of the dispute may be traced as far back as the middle of 2008 when regulations that would see the single biggest overhaul in the sport's sixty-year history were approved for the 2009 season. Early in 2009, FIA President Max Mosley put forth a proposal for 2010 intended to secure the future of the sport despite the 2008 financial crisis. The proposal included an optional budget cap of €30 million (which was about $41.6 million in 2020), with greater technical and design freedoms allowed to teams who nominated to use it. This was a point of contention among the teams, who objected to what was essentially two different sets of rules within the championship.

In response to this, Ferrari filed an injunction with a French court in Paris in an attempt to stop the proposed regulations from being implemented. The courts ruled that Ferrari's objections were baseless; given its history and close association with the sport, the team had been awarded a technical veto a decade beforehand that would have allowed them to prevent any regulation changes they disagreed with, but the court ruled that as Ferrari had not used the veto at the previous meeting of the FIA World Motor Sport Council, they did not have grounds for a legal challenge.

== FOTA's objections and withdrawal ==
Seven of the FOTA teams – Ferrari, BMW Sauber, Toyota, Renault, Brawn GP, Red Bull and Toro Rosso announced their intentions to withdraw from the 2010 championship by virtue of not submitting entries. At the time, Bernie Ecclestone believed a compromise with the teams may be possible, but on May 15, the FIA failed to reach a settlement with the teams.

The ten FOTA teams met on the weekend of the Monaco Grand Prix, where they unanimously decided to withdraw by the end of the 2009 season unless the budget cap rules were changed, citing their opposition to the "two-tier" system and the need for continuity within the rules from one season to the next as their reasons. However, Williams submitted an unconditional entry to the FIA less than three days later, claiming that they existed solely for the purposes of racing and that withdrawing was against their purpose as a racing team. They were subsequently suspended from FOTA while negotiations continued. Force India submitted an unconditional entry of its own on June 5. They, too, were suspended from FOTA for their actions. All of the remaining FOTA teams eventually submitted conditional entries for the 2010 season.

== New teams for 2010 ==
Concurrently to this, the FIA intended to open the 2010 grid up to three new teams, and received entries from fifteen interested parties, including Prodrive, Lola, USF1 and Brabham. The 2010 entry list was published on June 12, and included new teams Campos Grand Prix, Manor Grand Prix and USF1. The FIA also claimed that Ferrari, Red Bull and Toro Rosso were contractually bound to compete until 2012 and so included them on the entry list, and gave remaining teams Brawn, McLaren-Mercedes, Renault and Toyota one week to remove the conditions attached to their entries. As many as four provisional teams were said to be in negotiations with the FIA in the event of one or more FOTA teams withdrawing for 2010; whether over the budget cap, a downturn in their road car division or other extenuating circumstances, Renault were reported to have informed suppliers of a potential withdrawal at the end of the season.

On June 16, the FIA announced its intentions to continue ahead with the budget cap, now raised to €45 million (which was about $62.4 million in 2020) after talks with FOTA once again failed to find a resolution. Claiming that a solution had been put forth a week previously, the FIA accused factions within FOTA of sabotaging the negotiations, and further claimed that the organisation was attempting to gain control over the governance and commercial rights to the sport, a practice it declared unacceptable.

== Threat of breakaway series ==
In the week preceding the British Grand Prix, the eight remaining FOTA teams wrote to the FIA, calling for an urgent compromise to the situation and requesting an extension to the deadline in order to negotiate a new Concorde Agreement. The letter made it clear that the FOTA teams were willing to commit until 2012 and supply new teams with technical knowledge and advice. The FIA replied within two hours, indicating that it was willing to deal with FOTA, but stated that the June 19 deadline would stand owing to obligations to the potential new teams and the inability to agree on a new Concorde Agreement in such a short period of time. Mosley's proposal would see the introduction of a budget cap, engine and gearbox rules remaining fixed and the allowance of tyre warmers which were previously expected to be banned for 2010. In addition, Mosley stated a willingness to review the FIA's International Court of Appeal and abandon a controversial appendix to the 2010 rules that would give the FIA the unconditional authority to set rules.

However, after a meeting at Renault's base of operations in Enstone, the eight FOTA teams announced their intentions to press ahead with a breakaway series, similar to the divisions in American open-wheel racing leagues between USAC and CART in 1979 (similar in that most "name" teams and drivers left for the new championship), or CART and the IRL in 1996. After threatening legal action, the FIA renounced its position, offering to talk with the teams. FOTA, however, disagreed, claiming that the decision had already been made and that they would not be changing their minds, though Red Bull's Christian Horner stated that he felt it was foolish to commit to everything too soon. Commercial rights holder Bernie Ecclestone later vowed to ensure the future of the sport, claiming that the ongoing issues between the FIA and FOTA amounted to "basically, nothing".

Overall, fan opinion polls at the time showed overall support for the breakaway series with a Sky Sport poll showing that 91% of Italian fans would support FOTA's potential breakaway series and a Network 10 poll showing more than 65% of respondents supporting the New FOTA series over Formula One.

The conflict came to an apparent head on June 24 at the meeting of the World Motor Sport Council in Paris, with FOTA agreeing to remain within the championship and FIA President Max Mosley agreeing not to stand for re-election in October. However, the resolution was thrown into potential jeopardy just twenty-four hours later, with Mosley demanding FOTA in general and Luca di Montezemolo in particular apologise for misleading the media, suggesting Mosley to be a 'dictator' and that he would have no involvement in Formula One until he stepped down as President, no involvement in the FIA afterwards and that he was forced out of office.

== Further complications ==
On 8 July, the FOTA group of teams walked out of a meeting with the FIA about future rules. FOTA were informed that they were not entered for the 2010 season and could therefore have no input on regulatory discussions. It was later announced that plans for a breakaway series were still being pursued. However, on the weekend of the German Grand Prix, FOTA teams expressed confidence in ending the ongoing debate, stating their intentions to negotiate the terms of a new Concorde Agreement directly with CVC, the company that controls the commercial rights to the sport, with a resolution possibly being found in time for the Hungarian Grand Prix. Later that same day, Bernie Ecclestone announced that he would be involved in the process and vowed to have the sport's future secured with a new Concorde Agreement signed within forty-eight hours, ending the breakaway threat, and on July 15, it was confirmed that Max Mosley would step down from the FIA Presidency.

On July 6, an unnamed team made accusations against the FIA that new teams had been selected on the basis that they had no association with the current manufacturers. On July 12, unsuccessful applicants N.Technology filed a legal challenge against the FIA in Paris, claiming they had been informed that the only way to receive an entry for 2010 was to nominate the use of a Cosworth spec-engine when the team felt it stood a "real chance" of securing a deal with a current engine supplier. The case was heard on October 13, with the decision released on November 10, the French courts rejecting N.Technology's claims.

== 2009 Concorde Agreement and BMW's withdrawal ==
On the weekend of the 2009 Hungarian Grand Prix, the thirteen teams met with commercial rights holder CVC to discuss a new Concorde Agreement which would guarantee the sport's future until 2012. The FIA announced that it was willing to sign the agreement provided that all thirteen teams could agree to cost-cutting measures, but two teams – Williams and Manor – had raised late objections to the proposal. Proposed cost-cutting regulations include homologation of front and rear wings, a limit on the number of upgrades a team can introduce over the course of a season, a continuation of the in-season testing ban introduced in 2009, restrictions on the number of personnel able to attend a race, and the teams agreeing to completely close down their factories during the summer break.

On 29 July 2009 BMW Sauber announced they were withdrawing from Formula One at the end of the 2009 season. They cited "current developments in motor sport" as the reason for their decision . Three days later on August 1, it was announced that the FIA had signed the Concorde Agreement, thus bringing an end to the dispute.

== Zoran Stefanovic and the European Commission ==
Following N.Technology's lawsuit against the FIA, a complaint was made to the European Commission by Zoran Stefanovic, an aspiring team principal supporting N.Technology's claims that the FIA had required new teams to nominate a Cosworth engine if they wanted to join the 2010 grid. Stefanovic had intended to field a team to be known as Stefan Grand Prix and that he had explored the possibility of acquiring engines from a current manufacturer. His complaint to the European Commission claimed that the FIA demonstrated bias in the selection process and was in violation of anti-competition laws, and he requested that the selection process be carried out again.

Stefanovic had attempted to enter Formula One on two previous occasions, including an attempt to purchase the remains of Lola's disastrous 1997 attempt. He claimed that the FIA had not simply shown bias against non-Cosworth teams, but also against teams that would be classified as manufacturers, citing that new teams Manor, Campos and USF1 were forced to outsource the design of their chassis to other firms and design studios whereas Stefan Grand Prix had the support of Serbian aircraft manufacturer AMCO, and thus could build their own cars independently. This bias, he claimed, was supported by Prodrive's failure to make the grid; like Stefan, Prodrive would have the facilities to build their own chassis. Stefanovic, however, had the support of Mike Coughlan, the disgraced McLaren engineer.

Despite Stefanovic's planned action against, he announced his intentions to field a team in time for the season-opening race in Bahrain and compete despite not having a grid position in a move similar to the stillborn Phoenix Finance team and their failed attempt to purchase a grid position in 2002. Stefanovic cited the FIA granting a precedented fourteenth grid position to Peter Sauber's Qadbak Investments team as his inspiration, claiming that in the event that any one of the 2010 teams withdrew, the FIA may grant another special entry to Stefan Grand Prix. This was at odds with the FIA's assertion that in the event that a team were to withdraw, special provisions would not be issued.

== Aftermath ==
In the end the budget cap rules did not enter into Formula One for the 2010 season and BMW and Toyota would ultimately leave Formula One, with BMW Sauber turning into just Sauber which ran cars with Ferrari engines in Toyota's former grid spot until 2018 when it became Alfa Romeo Racing. The other new teams that joined the grid in 2010 - Team Lotus, Virgin Racing, HRT Formula 1 Team would not survive for the rest of the 2010s even after the teams went through changes in ownership. in 2016 Haas F1 Team joined the grid, bringing Formula One into a state of 10 teams which remained stable for a decade, until Cadillac F1 Team was granted entry in 2026, pushing the grid back up to 11 teams, which it remains at today. In 2020 Formula One teams agreed to introduce a new cost cap for the 2021 season which was initially set at $175 million before being reduced to $145 million for 2021 due to the covid-19 pandemic. The new cost cap will also decrease as time goes on, and includes exceptions such as marketing costs, driver salaries, the salaries of the three highest-paid team employees, team heritage activities, finance costs, taxes, among other exceptions. The cost cap introduced in 2021 is thus twice as high in allowed spending than the cost cap proposed in 2009. Also in 2020, Formula One introduced a new $200 million franchise fee for new teams entering the sport which would be shared across the 10 existing teams in order to make teams show a multi-year commitment to the sport, offset the dilution a new team would cause to the existing prize fund totals that is split between all Formula One teams, and to protect the value of existing Formula One teams. Previous to this, the franchise fee required that new teams pay into Formula One, with the fee gradually returned to the team.

== See also ==
- FISA–FOCA war, a similar disagreement between the sport's governing body and its participants in the early 1980s.
- FIM–IRTA war, a similar disagreement between Grand Prix motorcycle racing's governing body and its participants in the late 1980s and early 1990s.
