= 2010 Formula One World Championship =

Motor racing championship

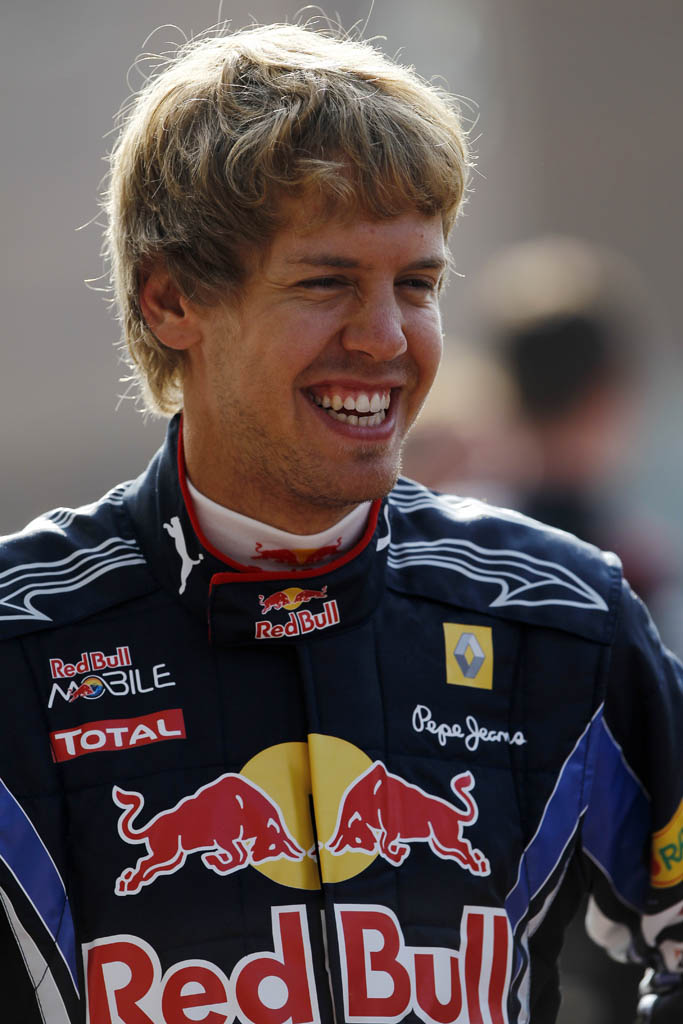
Sebastian Vettel won the first of his four consecutive World Championships with Red Bull, becoming the youngest World Champion in Formula One history until Kimi Antonelli in 2026.

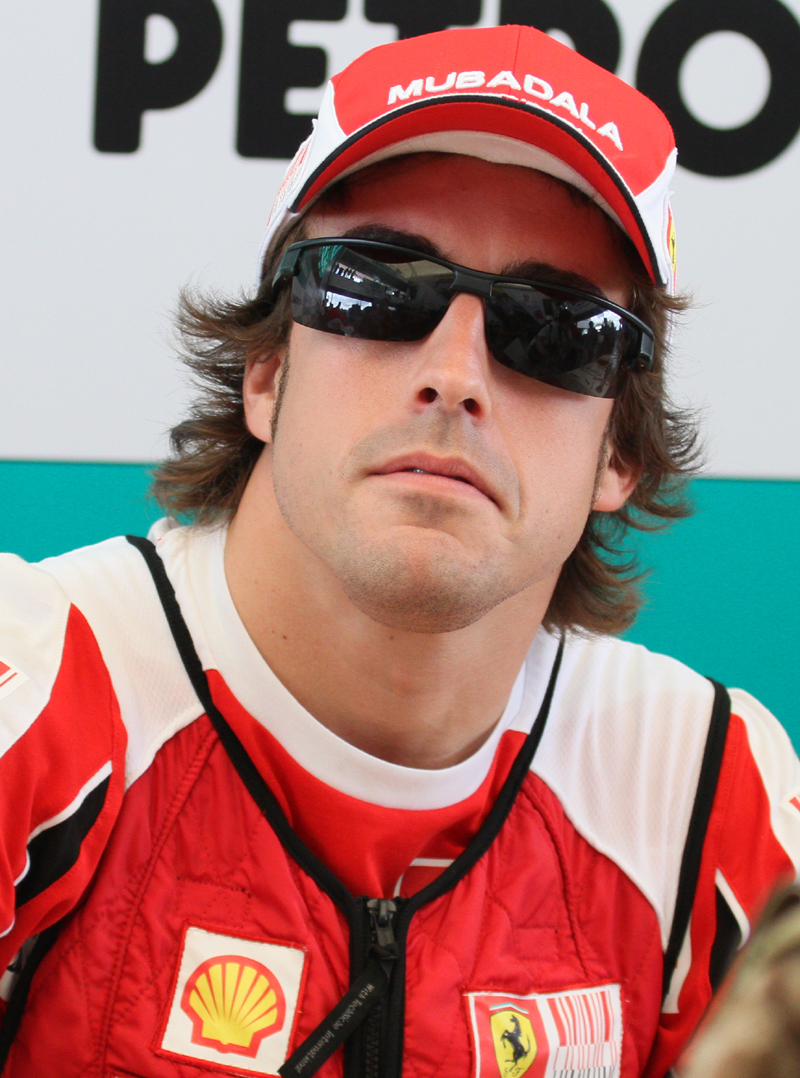
Two-time champion Fernando Alonso was runner-up by just 4 points in his first year with Ferrari.

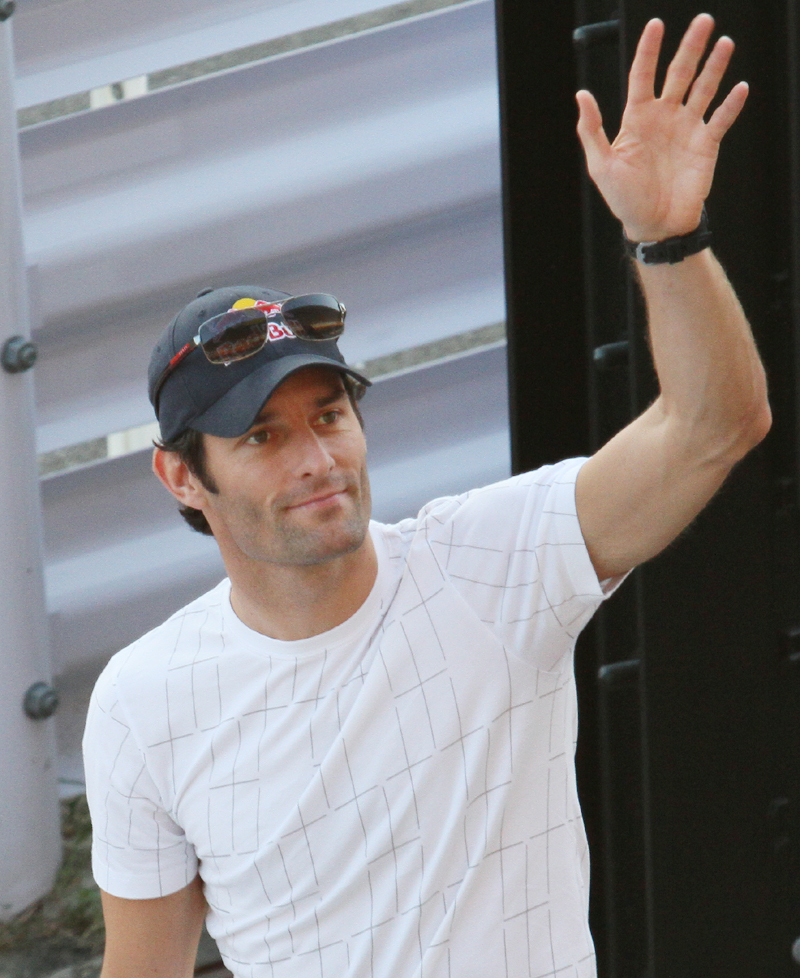
Mark Webber, Vettel's teammate, finished third in the Drivers' Championship 14 points behind.

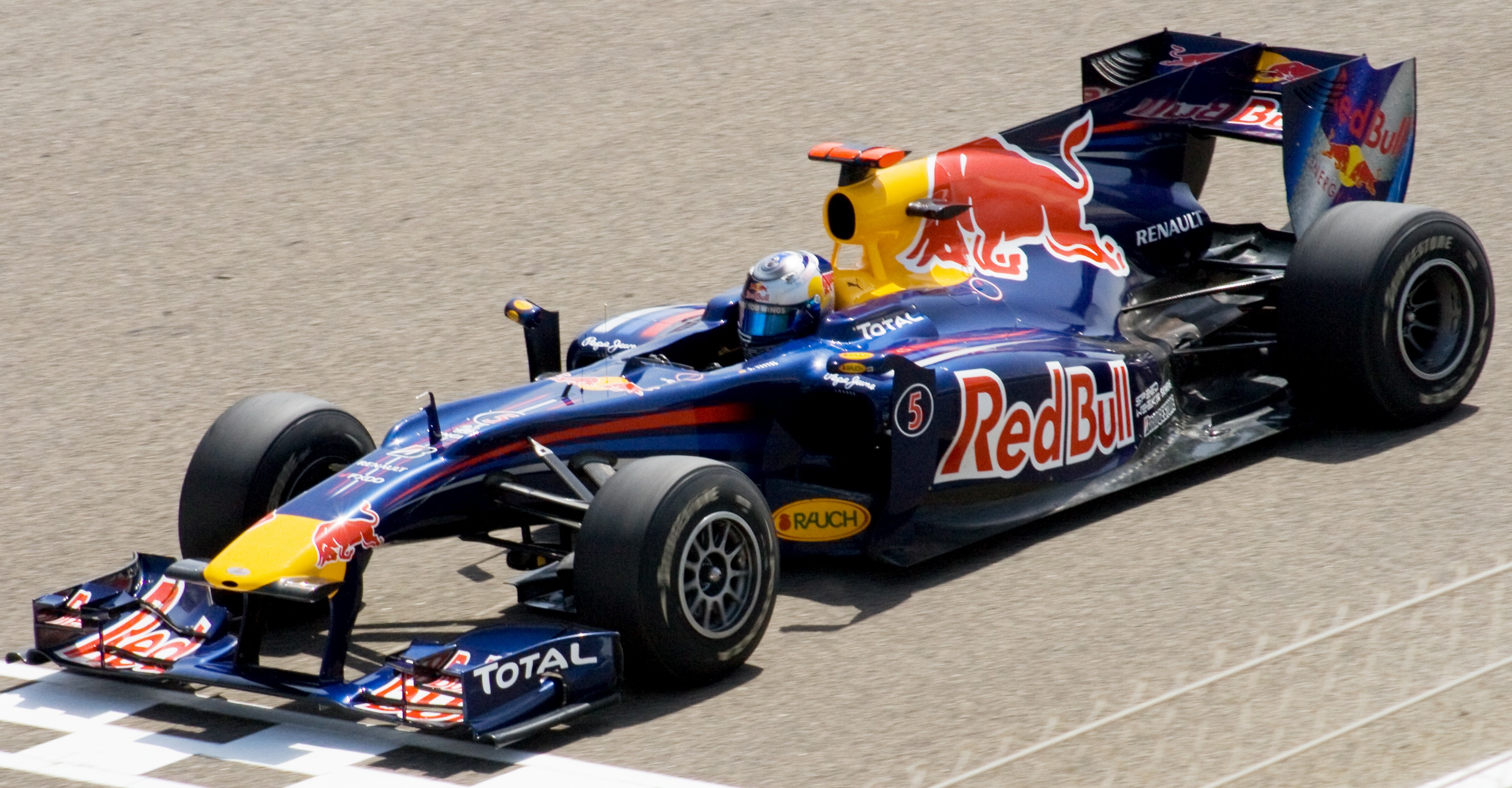
Red Bull Racing won their first Constructors' Championship with the Red Bull RB6.

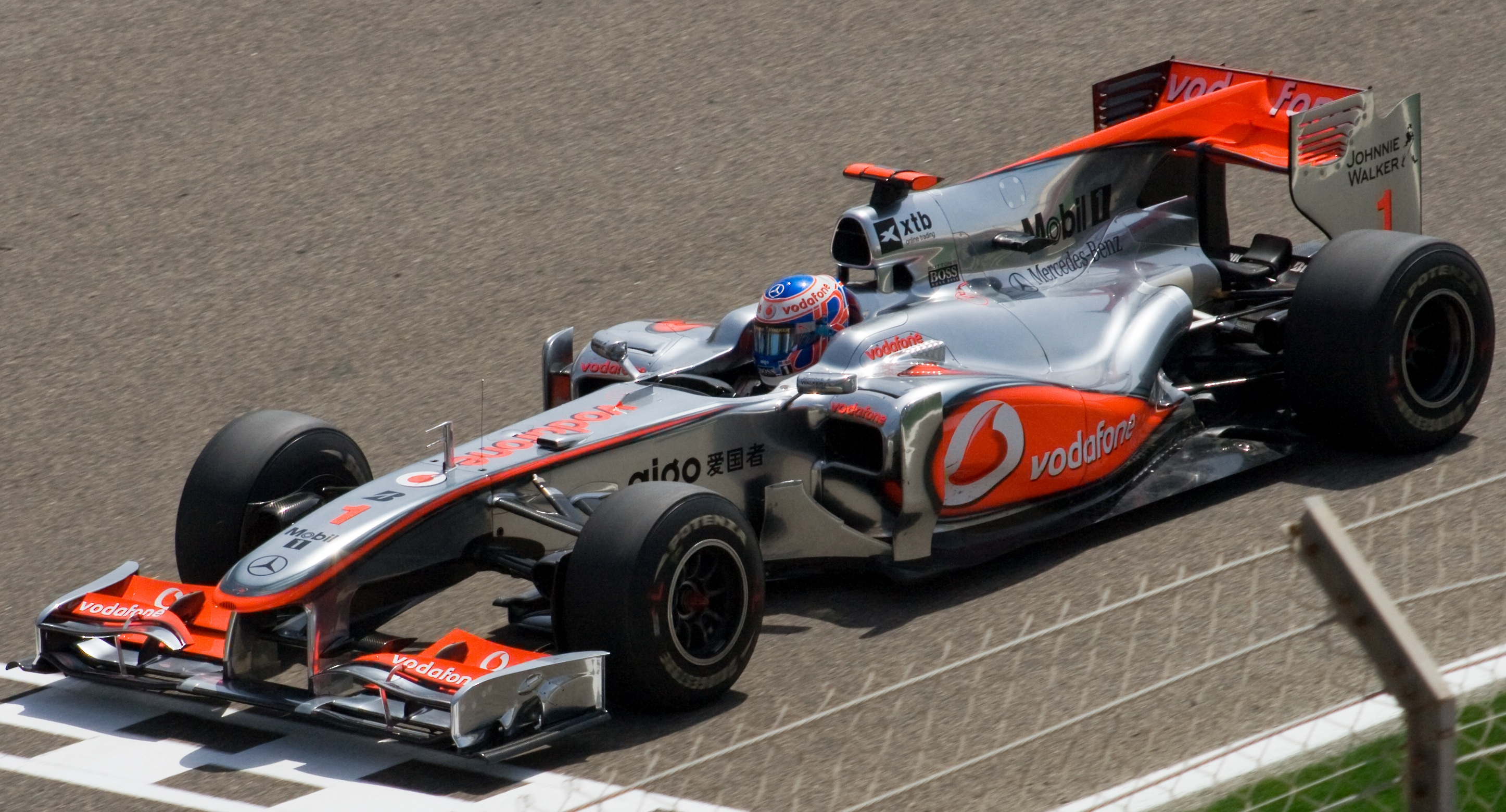
McLaren finished runner-up in the World Constructors' Championship with the McLaren MP4-25.

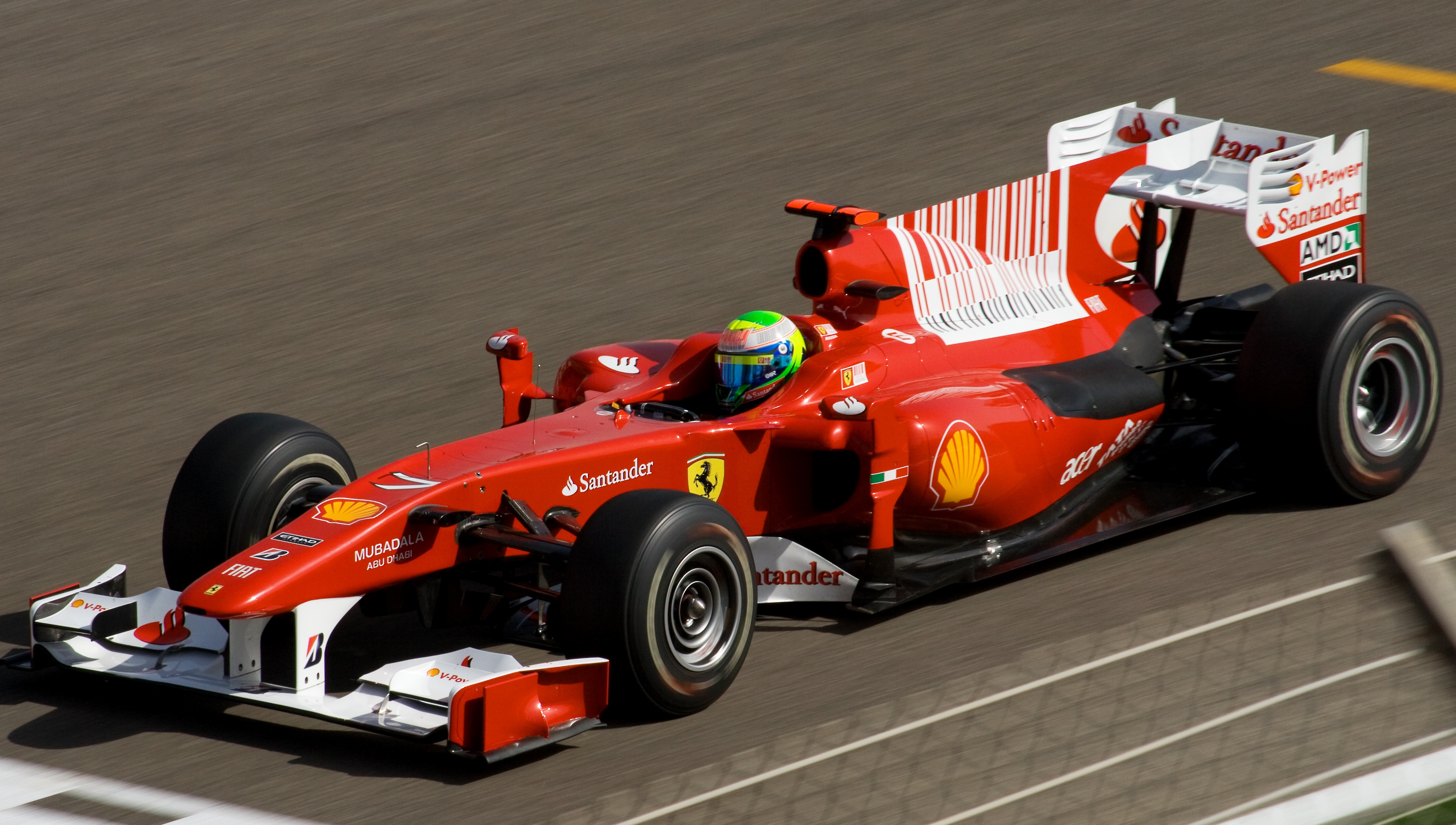
Ferrari finished in third place in the World Constructors' Championship with the Ferrari F10.

The 2010 FIA Formula One World Championship was the 64th season of FIA Formula One motor racing. The season's first race was held on 14 March in Bahrain and the season concluded on 14 November in the United Arab Emirates after 19 motor races held in 18 countries on five continents. Red Bull Racing won its maiden Constructors' Championship with a 1–2 finish in Brazil, while Red Bull Racing's Sebastian Vettel won the Drivers' Championship after winning the final race of the season in Abu Dhabi. In doing so, Vettel became the youngest World Drivers' Champion in the 61-year history of the championship. Vettel's victory in the championship came after a dramatic season finale at Abu Dhabi where three other drivers could also have won the championship – Vettel's Red Bull Racing teammate Mark Webber, Ferrari's Fernando Alonso and McLaren's Lewis Hamilton. It was also the third time in Formula One history after John Surtees in 1964 and Kimi Räikkönen in 2007 that the championship had been won by the driver heading into the season finale as third in the standings.

Before the start of the season, 2009 Drivers' Champion Jenson Button joined McLaren, while the 2009 Constructors' Champion, Brawn GP, was bought by German motor vehicle manufacturer Mercedes-Benz and was renamed as Mercedes GP. The 2010 season saw the return of the most successful driver in Formula One history at that point, with seven-time World Champion Michael Schumacher coming out of retirement after a three-year absence since 2006.

The points system was changed, with 25 points being awarded for first place, 18 for second, 15 for third, then 12, 10, 8, 6, 4, 2, and 1 for fourth to tenth. The technical and sporting regulations applicable for the season were the subject of much debate. This season also saw refuelling during race pitstops banned for the first time since 1993. Until 2024, when McLaren-Mercedes won the Constructors' Championship, it was the last time a customer-engine independent team won the Constructors' Championship, before Red Bull Racing was promoted to Renault's main works partner team from the 2011 to 2015 seasons. This was also Bridgestone's final season as the sole tyre supplier in Formula One as the company announced that it would not renew its contract at the end of the season. After several months of deliberation, Pirelli was chosen as the tyre supplier for the 2011 season at the FIA World Motor Sport Council meeting in Geneva, in June 2010.

== Teams and drivers ==
The following teams and drivers competed in the 2010 FIA Formula One World Championship. With the withdrawal of BMW and Toyota from the sport, engine diversity in Formula One dropped to a 30-year low, with just four engine producers powering the entire grid (Ferrari, Mercedes, Renault and Cosworth), the lowest since 1980. Four new teams joined the grid: Mercedes, Lotus Racing, Virgin Racing and HRT. Teams competed with tyres supplied by Bridgestone.

Entrant	Constructor	Chassis	Engine	No.	Race Drivers	Rounds
(United Kingdom) Vodafone McLaren Mercedes	McLaren-Mercedes	MP4-25	Mercedes FO 108X	1	(United Kingdom) Jenson Button	All
(United Kingdom) Vodafone McLaren Mercedes	McLaren-Mercedes	MP4-25	Mercedes FO 108X	2	(United Kingdom) Lewis Hamilton	All
(Germany) Mercedes GP Petronas F1 Team	Mercedes	MGP W01	Mercedes FO 108X	3	(Germany) Michael Schumacher	All
(Germany) Mercedes GP Petronas F1 Team	Mercedes	MGP W01	Mercedes FO 108X	4	(Germany) Nico Rosberg	All
(Austria) Red Bull Racing	Red Bull-Renault	RB6	Renault RS27-2010	5	(Germany) Sebastian Vettel	All
(Austria) Red Bull Racing	Red Bull-Renault	RB6	Renault RS27-2010	6	(Australia) Mark Webber	All
(Italy) Scuderia Ferrari Marlboro	Ferrari	F10	Ferrari 056 2010	7	(Brazil) Felipe Massa	All
(Italy) Scuderia Ferrari Marlboro	Ferrari	F10	Ferrari 056 2010	8	(Spain) Fernando Alonso	All
(United Kingdom) AT&T Williams	Williams-Cosworth	FW32	Cosworth CA2010	9	(Brazil) Rubens Barrichello	All
(United Kingdom) AT&T Williams	Williams-Cosworth	FW32	Cosworth CA2010	10	(Germany) Nico Hülkenberg	All
(France) Renault F1 Team	Renault	R30	Renault RS27-2010	11	(Poland) Robert Kubica	All
(France) Renault F1 Team	Renault	R30	Renault RS27-2010	12	(Russia) Vitaly Petrov	All
Force India F1 Team	Force India-Mercedes	VJM03	Mercedes FO 108X	14	(Germany) Adrian Sutil	All
Force India F1 Team	Force India-Mercedes	VJM03	Mercedes FO 108X	15	(Italy) Vitantonio Liuzzi	All
(Italy) Scuderia Toro Rosso	Toro Rosso-Ferrari	STR5	Ferrari 056 2009	16	(Switzerland) Sébastien Buemi	All
(Italy) Scuderia Toro Rosso	Toro Rosso-Ferrari	STR5	Ferrari 056 2009	17	(Spain) Jaime Alguersuari	All
(Malaysia) Lotus Racing	Lotus-Cosworth	T127	Cosworth CA2010	18	(Italy) Jarno Trulli	All
(Malaysia) Lotus Racing	Lotus-Cosworth	T127	Cosworth CA2010	19	(Finland) Heikki Kovalainen	All
(Spain) Hispania Racing F1 Team	HRT-Cosworth	F110	Cosworth CA2010	20	(India) Karun Chandhok	1–10
(Spain) Hispania Racing F1 Team	HRT-Cosworth	F110	Cosworth CA2010	20	(Austria) Christian Klien	15, 18–19
(Spain) Hispania Racing F1 Team	HRT-Cosworth	F110	Cosworth CA2010	20	(Japan) Sakon Yamamoto	11–14, 16–17
(Spain) Hispania Racing F1 Team	HRT-Cosworth	F110	Cosworth CA2010	21	(Japan) Sakon Yamamoto	10
(Spain) Hispania Racing F1 Team	HRT-Cosworth	F110	Cosworth CA2010	21	(Brazil) Bruno Senna	1–9, 11–19
(Switzerland) BMW Sauber F1 Team	BMW Sauber-Ferrari	C29	Ferrari 056 2009	22	(Spain) Pedro de la Rosa	1–14
(Switzerland) BMW Sauber F1 Team	BMW Sauber-Ferrari	C29	Ferrari 056 2009	22	(Germany) Nick Heidfeld	15–19
(Switzerland) BMW Sauber F1 Team	BMW Sauber-Ferrari	C29	Ferrari 056 2009	23	(Japan) Kamui Kobayashi	All
(United Kingdom) Virgin Racing	Virgin-Cosworth	VR-01	Cosworth CA2010	24	(Germany) Timo Glock	All
(United Kingdom) Virgin Racing	Virgin-Cosworth	VR-01	Cosworth CA2010	25	(Brazil) Lucas di Grassi	All

=== Free practice drivers ===
Four constructors entered free practice only drivers over the course of the season.

Drivers that took part in free practice sessions during the 2010 FIA Formula One World Championship
Constructor	Practice drivers	
Constructor	Driver name	Rounds
Force India-Mercedes	(United Kingdom) Paul di Resta	2–5, 9–10, 12, 14
HRT-Cosworth	(Austria) Christian Klien (Japan) Sakon Yamamoto	5, 9; 7
Lotus-Cosworth	(Malaysia) Fairuz Fauzy	3, 10–11, 15, 19
Virgin-Cosworth	(Belgium) Jérôme d'Ambrosio	15–18

=== New entries process ===
The FIA announced its intention to open up the grid, aiming for a total of 13 teams, and in July 2009 selected three new teams from 15 new applicants, as well as confirming the entry of all 10 existing teams. The existing F1 teams, under the FOTA organisation, are understood to have agreed a system of technical support to assist new teams. This compromise proposal would involve the supply of parts and design knowledge to the new entrants, but not full customer cars, in return for which the budget cap idea was dropped.

The three teams on the entry list released in July 2009 included Campos Meta, a Spanish team led by former driver and GP2 team owner Adrian Campos and Madrid-based sports advertising agency Meta Image; Manor Grand Prix, an F3 team run by John Booth and designer Nick Wirth (who was formerly involved in the Simtek Ford team who competed in 1994 and 1995); and US F1, a team created by former designer Ken Anderson and journalist Peter Windsor. Following the withdrawal of BMW Sauber, Lotus Racing was accepted to return to the grid for the first time since the 1994 Australian Grand Prix. Manor became known as Virgin Racing after Richard Branson's Virgin Group purchased naming rights to the team, while Campos-Meta was reimagined as Hispania Racing after investor José Ramón Carabante purchased the team from Adrian Campos shortly before the first race of the season. USF1 officially withdrew from the championship in early March, following months of speculation and accusations from whistleblowers that the team had been crippled by mismanagement for months.

The FIA also had several entry bids from other racing teams including World Series by Renault and Le Mans entrant Epsilon Euskadi, Dave Richards's highly successful Prodrive outfit and Italian touring car team N.Technology as well as re-imaginings of former teams March, Brabham, Lola Cars and Team Lotus (not to be confused with Lotus Racing). Other expressions of interest came from Team Superfund, an Austrian outfit to be fronted by former driver Alex Wurz and myf1dream.com, a team established by fans of the sport and funded by their donations. Experienced sports car and touring car entrant Ray Mallock Limited had intended to submit an entry bid, but decided against it following the mid-season political crisis.

Of the most interest to the media was Stefan Grand Prix, created by Zoran Stefanovic and hailed as Serbia's first Formula 1 team. Stefan claimed to have acquired the remains of Toyota's abandoned TF110 chassis and engine and had access to Toyota Motorsport's former headquarters in Cologne, Germany. After being rejected from the grid, Stefanovic filed a complaint with the European Commission over the entry selection process and then announced his intentions to continue development of the Toyota chassis, re-badged as the Stefan S-01, with the team even going so far as to send equipment to Bahrain, Australia and Malaysia. After several difficulties including the cancellation of a planned test in Portugal when Bridgestone refused to supply tyres, Stefan attempted to purchase the defunct USF1 entry, but the moves were blocked. Stefan was finally rejected on 4 March when the FIA stated that it was not possible to issue entries so close to the season opener.

=== Team changes ===
- BMW announced their withdrawal from Formula One following the end of the 2009 season on 29 July 2009, citing a lack of future viability and sustainability for the program and thus for the first time since 1999 season the sport would not feature BMW engine brand. After a failed buy out from Qadbak Investments, the team was sold back to Peter Sauber. The FIA officially accepted the team to the 2010 grid under the name BMW Sauber on 3 December, using a Swiss racing licence and Ferrari engines after the Toyota withdrawal.
- Toyota withdrew from Formula One on 4 November 2009, due to financial difficulties in the automotive industry. After announcing they would not sell the team, their grid slot went to the Sauber team. Stefan Grand Prix claimed that they had acquired the rights to Toyota Motorsport's former headquarters in Cologne and the TF110 that was renamed Stefan S–01. The withdrawal of Toyota meant that the sport would not feature a Japanese–licensed constructor for the first season since 2001 or a Japanese–licensed engine manufactured since 1982, up until 2015 when Honda returned to the sport with McLaren.
- Scuderia Toro Rosso became an independent constructor in 2010, after having their chassis supplied by Red Bull Racing for their first years of racing. This had allowed the team to purchase customer chassis, despite the concept being banned by the FIA. This loophole was closed for 2010, meaning that the STR5 2010 car was the first car Toro Rosso built on their own, having spent most of 2009 expanding their base of operations in Faenza, Italy to accommodate production facilities.
- Daimler AG, parent company of Mercedes-Benz, bought a 75.1% controlling stake in the 2009 champions Brawn GP, renaming the team Mercedes Grand Prix, Mercedes' last F1 race was the 1955 Italian Grand Prix. Mercedes's former 40% stake in the McLaren Group was purchased back by McLaren, although Mercedes would continue to supply McLaren engines and sponsorship until the end of the 2014 season. Mercedes signed a sponsorship deal with Petronas as the Malaysian petroleum company ended its association with BMW Sauber, and the team was renamed to Mercedes GP Petronas Formula One Team.
- Renault sold Gerard Lopez and his investment company a 75% majority shareholding, in order to secure the team's future. The team continued to operate under the Renault name and the engine department remained under full Renault ownership. The deal left the possibility for Renault to regain complete ownership once the economic situation had stabilised.

=== Driver changes ===
Changed teams

- 2005 and 2006 World Champion Fernando Alonso left Renault to drive for Ferrari in 2010, replacing Kimi Räikkönen who left the team at the end of the 2009 season. Alonso had signed a three-year deal up to the end of 2012, with options for further years.
- Rubens Barrichello moved from Brawn to Williams.
- Reigning world champion Jenson Button joined Lewis Hamilton at McLaren following the failure to negotiate a contract with Mercedes, which bought out his 2009 team, Brawn GP. This meant that McLaren had signed the two most recent World Champions, and had the sport's first double champion line-up since Ayrton Senna and Alain Prost, also driving for McLaren, in 1989.
- Timo Glock officially joined Virgin Racing, after leaving the Toyota Racing team.
- Kamui Kobayashi, who made his debut for the now-defunct Toyota team at the end of 2009 covering for the injured Timo Glock, transferred to the newly revived Sauber team.
- Heikki Kovalainen joined the new Lotus Racing team, after leaving McLaren.
- Robert Kubica left BMW Sauber to drive for Renault in 2010, as a replacement for Alonso.
- Nico Rosberg left Williams at the end of the 2009 season after four years with the team since 2006, moving to Mercedes.
- Jarno Trulli moved from Toyota to Lotus Racing.

Entered Formula One

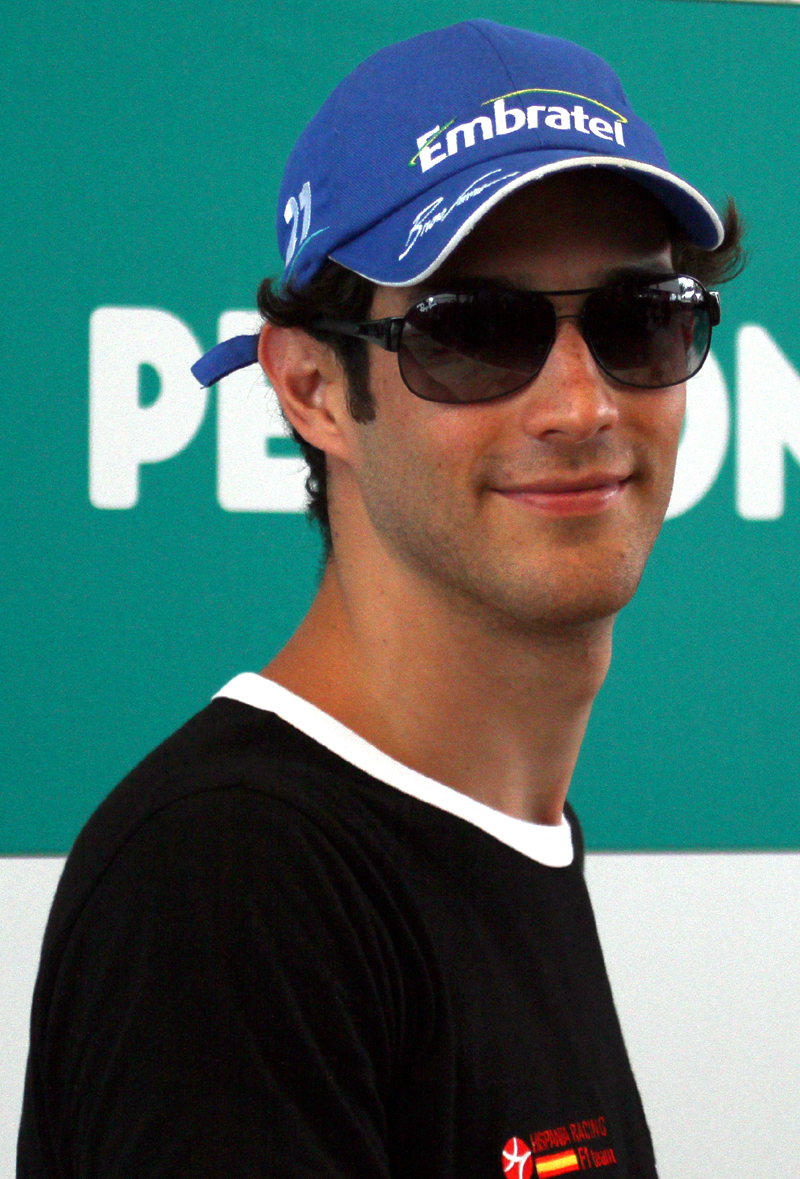
Bruno Senna made his debut with the new Hispania team.

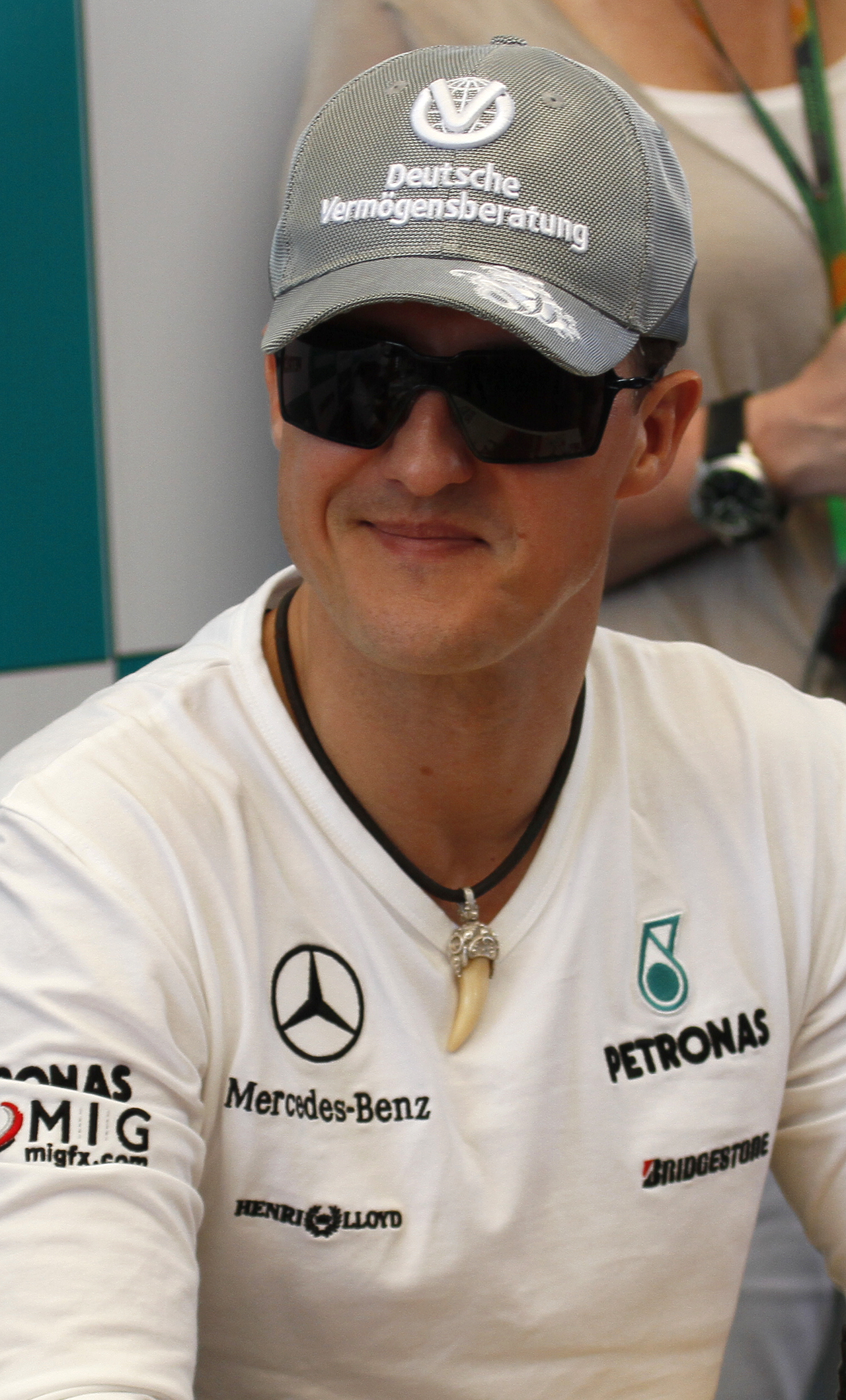
Michael Schumacher returned to the sport with Mercedes after a 3-year hiatus.

- Karun Chandhok, who placed eighteenth in the 2009 GP2 Series for Ocean Racing Technology, joined former iSport International teammate Bruno Senna at Hispania Racing. Chandhok was the second Formula One driver from India, after Narain Karthikeyan drove for Jordan Grand Prix in 2005.
- Lucas di Grassi, who placed third in the 2009 GP2 Series for Racing Engineering, joined Timo Glock at Virgin Racing.
- Nico Hülkenberg, 2009 GP2 Series champion with ART Grand Prix, made his debut in Formula One with Williams, alongside Barrichello.
- Vitaly Petrov, who placed second in the 2009 GP2 Series, moved from Barwa Addax to partner Robert Kubica at Renault, becoming Russia's first driver in the Formula One World Championship.
- Bruno Senna, nephew of three-time World Champion Ayrton Senna, joined Hispania Racing in 2010, returning the Senna name to Formula One sixteen years after his uncle's death in 1994.

Exited Formula One

- Giancarlo Fisichella became Ferrari's reserve and test driver in 2010, having left Force India and joined Ferrari towards the end of 2009. After failing to secure a racing drive, he signed up to take part in the Le Mans Series.
- Romain Grosjean was unable to secure a contract with Renault, due to Petrov's appointment as Renault's second driver and competed in the inaugural FIA GT1 World Championship for Matech Competition.
- After a poor 2009 season, Williams driver Kazuki Nakajima was unable to secure a drive for 2010. On 19 February, it was confirmed that he would join aspiring Serbian outfit Stefan Grand Prix, despite their lack of an entry to the grid.
- 2007 World Champion Kimi Räikkönen took a two-year "sabbatical" from Formula One in 2010 after his managers confirmed that negotiations with McLaren officially came to an end. Räikkönen instead joined the Citroën Junior Team in the 2010 World Rally Championship, driving a Citroën C4 WRC in twelve of the thirteen rounds of the championship.

Returned to Formula One

- Pedro de la Rosa returned to Formula One driving for the Sauber team, having previously served as test driver for McLaren. His return ended a three-year absence from racing since 2007, his last Grand Prix start being a half-season campaign in 2006.
- Seven-time World Champion Michael Schumacher officially joined Mercedes on 23 December 2009, ending a three-year hiatus from the sport since 2007. Schumacher had originally intended to make a comeback with Ferrari in 2009 to stand in for the injured Felipe Massa, but was prevented from doing so by a motorcycle accident injury, and the Mercedes contract was not signed until he was given a clean bill of health. Schumacher previously raced for Mercedes in the 1991 World Sportscar Championship.

Mid-season changes

- Sakon Yamamoto, who last drove in Formula One for Spyker and tested for Renault, replaced Bruno Senna at Hispania for the British Grand Prix, having previously taken part in Friday practice at the Turkish Grand Prix. The team confirmed that Senna would return to his seat for the German Grand Prix. Yamamoto then replaced Karun Chandhok from the German Grand Prix onwards, except the races in Singapore, Brazil and Abu Dhabi, where the seat was filled by Christian Klien.
- During the mid-season hiatus, Nick Heidfeld left Mercedes to take up a new role with Pirelli as their official test driver ahead of their return to Formula One.
- Following the end of the European season at the Italian Grand Prix, Pedro de la Rosa was dropped by BMW Sauber and summarily replaced by Nick Heidfeld, who last drove for the team in 2009. It was reported that the change was made because of de la Rosa's poor performance relative to teammate Kamui Kobayashi in general and Heidfeld's knowledge of the Marina Bay and Yas Marina circuits in particular. With Heidfeld joining Sauber, former Renault driver Romain Grosjean was drafted in as his replacement for Pirelli.
- Hispania Racing test driver Christian Klien replaced Sakon Yamamoto for the Singapore Grand Prix after Yamamoto allegedly contracted food poisoning ahead of the race, but was later seen in the Singapore paddock suffering no apparent symptoms, sparking talk of unpaid debts by the Japanese driver and further financial afflictions for the team to deal with when the logo of one of Klien's personal sponsors appeared on the car for the weekend. Team principal Colin Kolles confirmed that the arrangement would be for one race and Yamamoto would return to the cockpit at Suzuka, provided he recovered in time. Klien also replaced Yamamoto at Interlagos and Abu Dhabi, though no explanation was given for the change.

== Calendar ==
On 21 September 2009 the provisional 2010 calendar was issued by the World Motor Sport Council containing 19 races, followed by a second provisional schedule which had the Abu Dhabi and Brazilian Grands Prix switching dates. The final calendar was released on 11 December 2009.

Round	Grand Prix	Circuit	Date
1	Bahrain Grand Prix	Bahrain International Circuit, Sakhir	14 March
2	Australian Grand Prix	(Australia) Albert Park Circuit, Melbourne	28 March
3	Malaysian Grand Prix	(Malaysia) Sepang International Circuit, Kuala Lumpur	4 April
4	Chinese Grand Prix	(China) Shanghai International Circuit, Shanghai	18 April
5	Spanish Grand Prix	(Spain) Circuit de Catalunya, Montmeló	9 May
6	Monaco Grand Prix	Circuit de Monaco, Monte Carlo	16 May
7	Turkish Grand Prix	(Turkey) Istanbul Park, Istanbul	30 May
8	Canadian Grand Prix	(Canada) Circuit Gilles Villeneuve, Montreal	13 June
9	European Grand Prix	(Spain) Valencia Street Circuit, Valencia	27 June
10	British Grand Prix	(United Kingdom) Silverstone Circuit, Silverstone	11 July
11	German Grand Prix	(Germany) Hockenheimring, Hockenheim	25 July
12	Hungarian Grand Prix	(Hungary) Hungaroring, Mogyoród	1 August
13	Belgian Grand Prix	(Belgium) Circuit de Spa-Francorchamps, Stavelot	29 August
14	Italian Grand Prix	(Italy) Autodromo Nazionale di Monza, Monza	12 September
15	Singapore Grand Prix	Marina Bay Street Circuit, Singapore	26 September
16	Japanese Grand Prix	(Japan) Suzuka Circuit, Suzuka	10 October
17	Korean Grand Prix	(South Korea) Korea International Circuit, Yeongam	24 October
18	Brazilian Grand Prix	(Brazil) Autódromo José Carlos Pace, São Paulo	7 November
19	Abu Dhabi Grand Prix	(United Arab Emirates) Yas Marina Circuit, Abu Dhabi	14 November

=== Calendar changes ===
- The Bahrain Grand Prix was run on a new layout at the Bahrain International Circuit. In this configuration, the drivers leave the old circuit shortly after turn four and follow a loop of nearly 900 metres in length, before re-joining the circuit before the old turn five. This increased the overall lap distance from 5.412 km (3.363 mi) to 6.299 km (3.914 mi). The race reverted to the circuit's original layout from 2012. The 2011 Bahrain Grand Prix was cancelled due to that year's Bahraini protests.
- The British Grand Prix was originally planned to move from Silverstone Circuit to Donington Park in 2010, but the owners of Donington Park failed to raise the necessary £135 million bond to redevelop the circuit and infrastructure. After extended negotiations with Bernie Ecclestone, the organisers of Silverstone came to an agreement that will see the British Grand Prix hosted by the circuit for the next seventeen years, utilising the new "Arena" configuration which increases lap distance by 760 metres (0.47 mi).
- The Canadian Grand Prix returned in 2010 after its one-year absence.
- The German Grand Prix returned to Hockenheim for one year, after being held at the Nürburgring in 2009.
- The Japanese Grand Prix was due to return to Fuji Speedway for 2010, as part of a year-on-year rotation with Suzuka Circuit. However, Fuji's owners Toyota announced that they had abandoned plans for Fuji to hold the race, citing the global recession as the main reason for this. Suzuka will continue to hold the event in 2010 and in 2011.
- South Korea made its first appearance on the F1 calendar under the name Korean Grand Prix with a race being held at the Korea International Circuit in Yeongam on 24 October. On 12 October, the circuit passed its inspection.
- The Indian Grand Prix was scheduled to debut at the Buddh International Circuit. However, this date was pushed back and the inaugural race eventually took place the following year.

== Changes ==
=== Regulation changes ===
- Refuelling during the races was abolished. Despite the resolution over the budget cap and the decision for 2010 to fall back to the 2009 rules, FOTA expressed interest in a refuelling ban as it represented a way to cut costs.

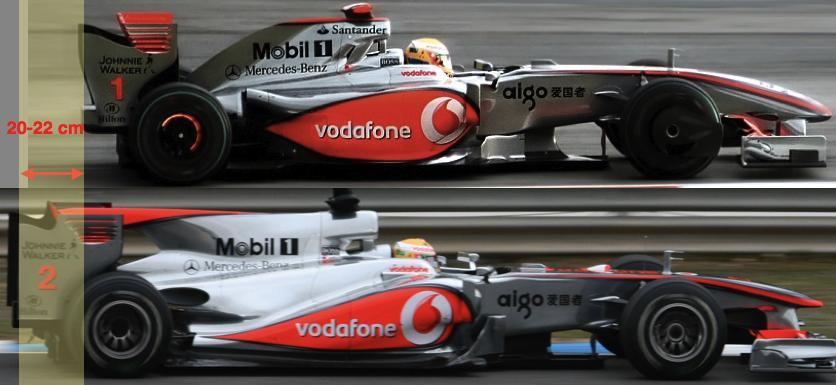
The 2010 cars were 20–22 cm longer than the 2009 versions because of the larger fuel tank.

- To accommodate the extra teams, the maximum number of cars allowed to take part in a race increased from 24 to 26 cars. Formula One Management offered financial support to all new teams for 2010, in the form of $10m (£6.25m, €6.8m) along with the free transportation of two chassis and 10,000 kg (22,049 lbs) of freight to each race. The increased number of teams now requires garages to be allocated on an equal basis at each Grand Prix.
- Teams had to homologate certain parts of the car, including the driver's survival cell, roll structures, all impact structures and the front and rear wheels, meaning they couldn't be modified over the course of the season without written approval from the FIA on safety or reliability grounds. The minimum car weight increased from 605 kg to 620 kg (1,334 lbs to 1,367 lbs) to better accommodate heavier drivers with KERS units, despite FOTA's agreement not to use the system.
- The qualifying system was changed to accommodate the extra cars: 7 cars dropped out of the first qualifying session, 7 from the second session and 10 cars challenged for pole position in the third session. The third sessions were run in a low-fuel configuration due to the refuelling ban, although these drivers had to start the races on the set of tyres used in the third session. If a tyre was damaged in qualifying, the FIA technical delegate assessed the extent of the damage and could allow the car to switch tyres to a set he deemed to be safe.

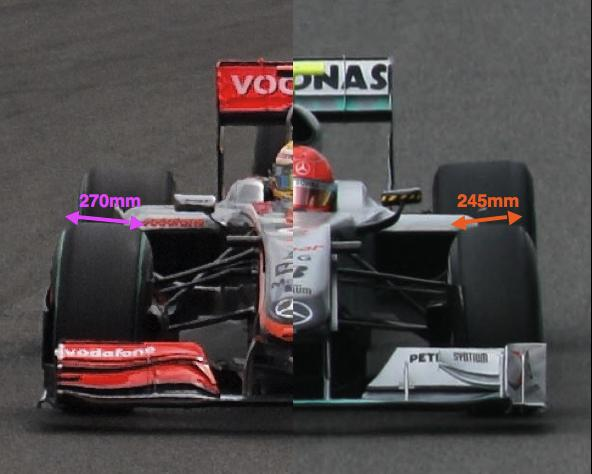
The front tyres changed from 270 mm (11 in) to 245 mm (9.6 in)

- Drivers were given eleven sets of tyres over the course of a weekend, reduced from the fourteen sets in 2009. Three of these sets were for practice only and were returned before the start of qualifying, regardless of whether they are used or not. The front tyres were narrowed from 270 mm (11 in) to 245 mm (9.6 in), in order to improve the balance of grip between the front and rear. Wheel covers and rim heaters were banned, and tyre blankets were only allowed to act on the tyre's outer surface.
- A new points system was ratified for 2010, in response to the increased grid. Since 2003, points had been awarded to the top eight finishers, on a 10–8–6–5–4–3–2–1. The 2010 system awarded the top ten classified finishers on a 25–18–15–12–10–8–6–4–2–1 basis.
- The stewarding system had a fixed pool of stewards to draw from for each race, including former racing drivers, instead of a rotating line-up. This was to make the stewarding process more transparent, following recent controversies involving the stewards. Previously, stewards were only able to issue twenty-five-second penalties for infractions that occurred too late in the race for drivers to receive a normal penalty, but for 2010 they had the power to hand out twenty-second penalties to drivers who would have received a drive-through penalty and thirty-second penalties to those who would have received a stop-and-go penalty. A penalty had to be completed within two laps of the issuing rather than the three of previous years now.
- Replacement drivers were permitted to one day of testing, provided they have not participated in an F1 race in the last two calendar years. This was in response to several drivers in 2009 competing in their début weekend with no experience of their F1 car. Teams are also allowed to run a replacement driver in the Friday practice sessions.
- Powered devices that lift any part of the car during the pit stop were banned, and to prevent teams from releasing a car into the path of an oncoming driver in pit lane, the crew had to wait until the oncoming driver that is within a 25 m (82 ft) zone either side of the pit box has passed.
- The Concorde Agreement, which governs Formula One, was renewed at the 2009 Hungarian Grand Prix. Several cost-cutting proposals were included, such as a limit on the number of aerodynamic upgrades permitted over the course of a season and restrictions on the number of team personnel who attend a Grand Prix weekend. Also included was a provision that teams were now able to miss as many as three races before being ejected from the championship, although the FIA was to impose some kind of penalty for a missed race.
- When a race was suspended neither the race nor the timekeeping system was stopped; however the length of the race suspension was always added to the maximum two hour period.

==== Mid-season changes ====
- A new parc fermé system, trialled in Bahrain, had cars sealed inside a bag within the team garages and monitored by low-resolution cameras, switching to a high-definition output if it sensed movement within the garage. The system was made a permanent procedure for parc fermé from the Australian Grand Prix.
- Wing mirrors – previously treated as aerodynamic aids instead of for the drivers benefit – may no longer be mounted in the "outboard" position, following concerns about poor visibility which resulted in several cases of accidental blocking in Melbourne. The ban was effective from the Spanish Grand Prix onwards.
- Following the success of the Canadian Grand Prix, tyre supplier Bridgestone announced its intentions to increase the difference between its compounds for the German Grand Prix, meaning that the teams have to deal with the extremes in the rubber compounds.
- At the FIA World Motor Sport Council meeting in Geneva, on 23 June, the rules regarding safety car conditions were clarified following a final-lap incident involving Michael Schumacher and Fernando Alonso at the Monaco Grand Prix. No car may overtake until it has passed the first safety car line for the first time when the safety car is returning to the pits. However, if the safety car is still deployed at the beginning of the last lap, or is deployed during the last lap, it will enter the pit lane at the end of the lap and the cars will take the chequered flag as normal without overtaking.
- Any car being driven unnecessarily slowly, erratically, or which is deemed potentially dangerous to other drivers, will be reported to the stewards. This will apply whether any such car is being driven on the track, the pit entry or the pit lane. To avoid coming under the scrutiny of the stewards, a driver must return to the pits within a pre-determined lap time set by the stewards.
- If a sample of fuel is required after a practice session the car concerned must have first been driven back to the pits under its own power. This was a response to qualifying at the Canadian Grand Prix when Lewis Hamilton stopped on the circuit after his team informed him that he may not have enough fuel left in the tank for the sample to be taken after the session. Although no action was taken against Hamilton, the stewards moved to prevent teams from deliberately doing it in the future.
- Following a minor controversy when Ferrari conducted a "filming day" at Fiorano ahead of the European Grand Prix using a car that included parts to be debuted at the race – which some felt was an attempt to circumvent bans on testing – changes were made to the rulebook that mean teams will be banned from running parts that have not been raced at a filming session or media event.
- Ferrari and Red Bull were both accused of having front wings that flexed at high speed, pushing them closer to the ground than is allowed. Although no wing ever failed scrutineers' tests, as of the Belgian Grand Prix the test was made more stringent by increasing the load applied to the wings. Similar changes were made at the Italian Grand Prix to the test of the front section of the floor under the nose (known as the bib).

=== Safety car ===
- The new Mercedes-Benz SLS AMG was introduced as the safety car for 2010.
- Following controversy at the European Grand Prix, the safety car rules were revised ahead of the British Grand Prix. In the event of a safety car deployment, drivers are given a "delta time" – 120% of a standard race lap (i.e. if the standard lap time is one minute, forty seconds, the delta time is two minutes) – a minimum lap time in which to get back to the pits or else be cited for speeding. However, following the Webber-Kovalainen crash in Valencia, several drivers were penalised for breaking the delta time as they had been racing ahead of the accident and the safety car was deployed as they approached the end of the lap; in effect, they had safely completed a lap at racing speeds and pitted at the earliest opportunity. Instead of following the delta time, drivers must slow down to the speed of the safety car from the moment it is deployed, but will be exempt from doing so for the final two hundred metres of the lap. As a result of this, it will prevent drivers from gaining an advantage by pitting at the earliest possible opportunity and emerging ahead of the safety car.

== Pre-season ==
=== Dispute over regulations and breakaway series ===
The Fédération Internationale de l'Automobile (FIA) had planned to introduce a budget cap, in order to safeguard the sport and reduce the costs. The proposal had an optional budget cap of €30 million ($45 million, £27 million), with greater technical and design freedoms allowed to teams who nominated to use it. The teams objected to what they believed would be a two-tier championship and five of the teams within the Formula One Teams Association (FOTA), Ferrari, BMW Sauber, Renault, Red Bull Racing and Toro Rosso announced their intentions to withdraw from the 2010 championship. BMW Sauber later announced on their withdrawal from Formula One at the end of the 2009 season.

Following negotiations, the FOTA teams unanimously decided to withdraw at the end of the 2009 season unless the budget cap rules were changed. Williams and Force India both submitted their own entries and were temporarily suspended from FOTA, while the remaining teams submitted conditional entries for the 2010 season. The 2010 entry list was published by the FIA on 12 June, which included all 2009 teams and three new teams, Campos Meta, Virgin Racing and US F1 Team. Discussions between the FIA and FOTA failed to find a resolution to the budget cap issues and the eight FOTA teams announced intentions to form a breakaway series for 2010. However, following a meeting of the World Motor Sport Council on 24 June, FOTA agreed to remain in Formula One and FIA president Max Mosley confirmed he would not stand for re-election in October.

During a meeting on 8 July between the FIA and FOTA on future regulations, the teams walked out of the meeting after being informed that they were not entered for the 2010 season and could therefore have no input on regulatory discussions. In response it was announced that plans for a breakaway series were still being pursued. Negotiations on a new Concorde Agreement directly with CVC, the commercial rights holders, led to the eventual end of the dispute with its signing by the FIA on 1 August. The new Concorde Agreement secured the sport's future until its expiration in 2012.

=== Testing ===
The new season test schedule started on 1 December 2009 with a three-day 'Young Driver Test' (for drivers with fewer than three Formula One race starts to their name) at Spain's Circuito de Jerez. British Formula 3 Champion Daniel Ricciardo was fastest for Red Bull Racing. As with 2009, the teams were allowed a maximum of 15,000 km (9,300 mi) over the course of fifteen days in February. Testing sessions were confirmed for Valencia (1–3 February), Jerez (10–13 February and 17–20 February) and Barcelona (25–28 February). All but Campos/Hispania and US F1 took part in the pre-season tests.

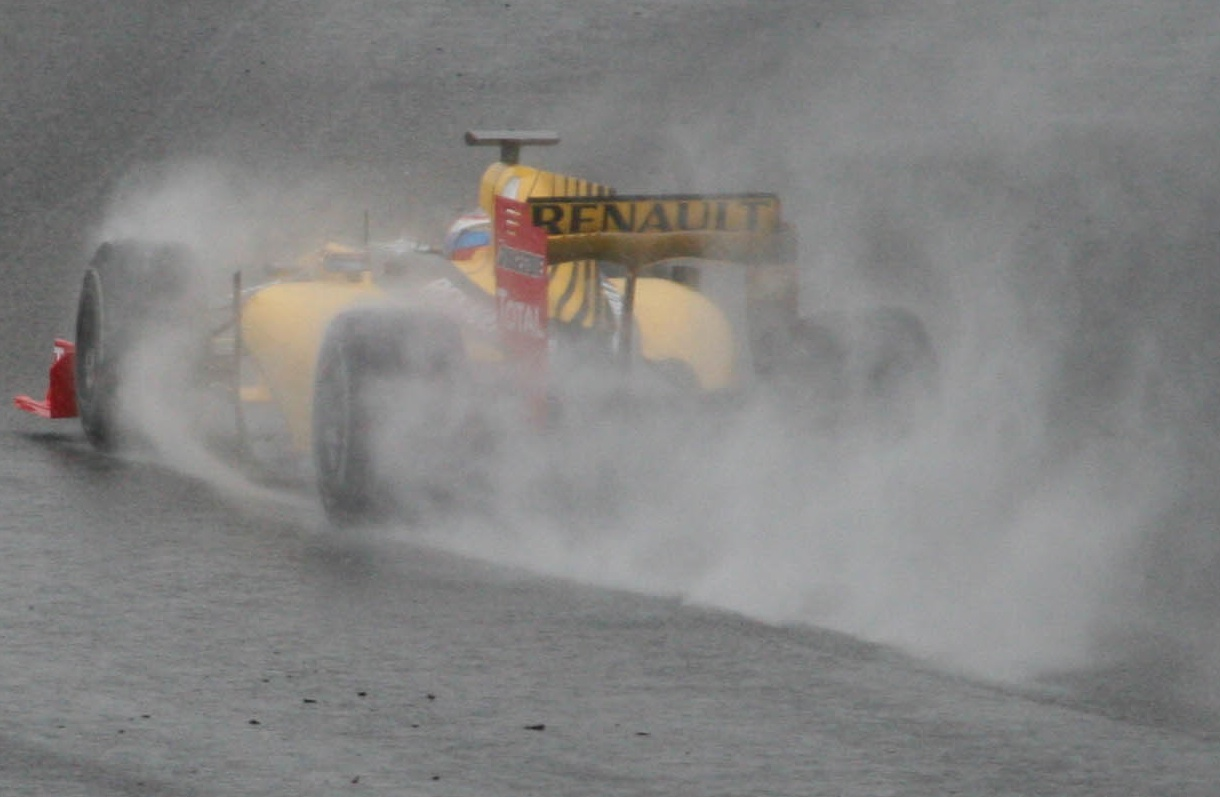
Testing sessions at Jerez were constantly interrupted by heavy rain.

Pre-season testing started at the Circuit Ricardo Tormo in Valencia with seven teams. Ferrari dominated the test session, with Felipe Massa setting the fastest lap times on days one and two. In his first appearance for the team, Fernando Alonso set the fastest overall time on the third day of the test with 1:11.470.

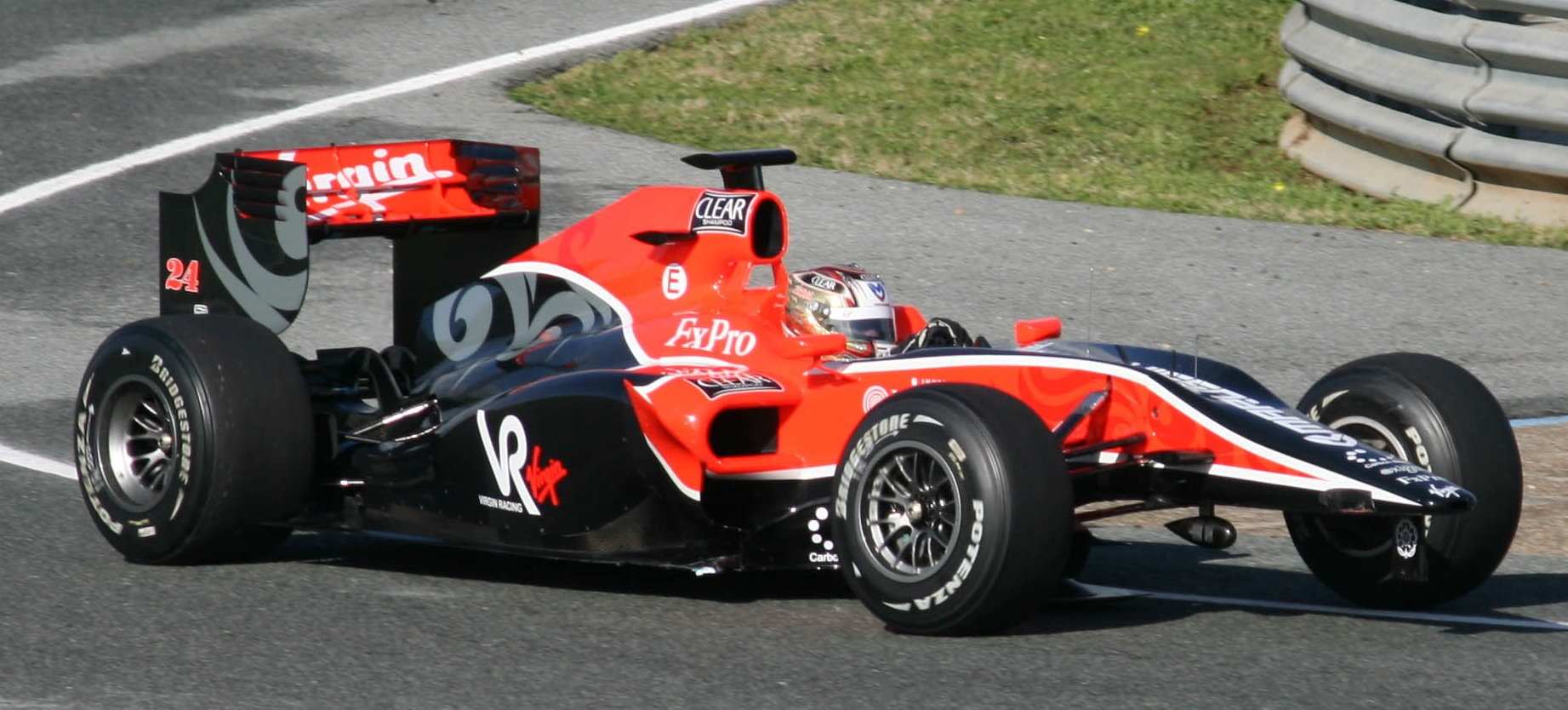
Virgin Racing had aerodynamic problems during the tests in Jerez and Barcelona.

The second session took place at Circuito de Jerez, Spain with heavy downpours throughout the test. This also marked the first public test for new team Virgin Racing who only managed five laps after a shortage of parts became a problem. Lewis Hamilton set the fastest lap of the test during a dry Saturday session with 1:19.583.

The third test at Jerez for another four-day test was also affected by mixed weather conditions. Lotus Racing started its first public test with the T127. The penultimate and last days saw sunny weather with Jenson Button setting the fastest time (1:18.871).

The last pre-season test took place at Circuit de Catalunya, Barcelona. The test started in sunny weather with rain showers scattered through the weekend. Virgin's testing misery carried on with Lucas di Grassi crashing and more mechanical issues. Lewis Hamilton set the fastest lap of the week (1:20.472) with most teams doing low fuel runs on Sunday.

== Report ==
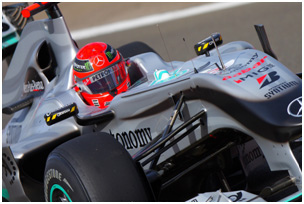
Michael Schumacher returned to the grid with the Mercedes team after coming out of retirement.

The 2010 season saw the debut of three new teams, Virgin, Lotus and Hispania. The teams were often more than three seconds per lap slower than the established teams. After fighting reliability issues early in the season, the three teams soon established themselves with Lotus leading the way, their best result being a twelfth place for Heikki Kovalainen in Japan. Virgin struggled after discovering their fuel tank was too small, forcing them to push their development schedule back five races in order to build a car that could finish the race. Hispania were the slowest of the three, and by mid-season were rotating their drivers on a regular basis, but a pair of fourteenth places by Karun Chandhok in Australia and Monaco put the team ahead of Virgin in the Constructors' Championship for most of the season.

In stark contrast to 2009, no one driver emerged as dominant in the early stages of the 2010 season. Fernando Alonso won the opening race of the season in Bahrain after Sebastian Vettel's engine misfired, with Alonso becoming just the sixth Ferrari driver to win on debut for the Italian team. Reigning World Champion Jenson Button claimed victory in Australia for the second year in succession, whilst Vettel won in Malaysia, setting up a unique situation that would last for the rest of the season whereby no driver would win a race while leading the World Championship.

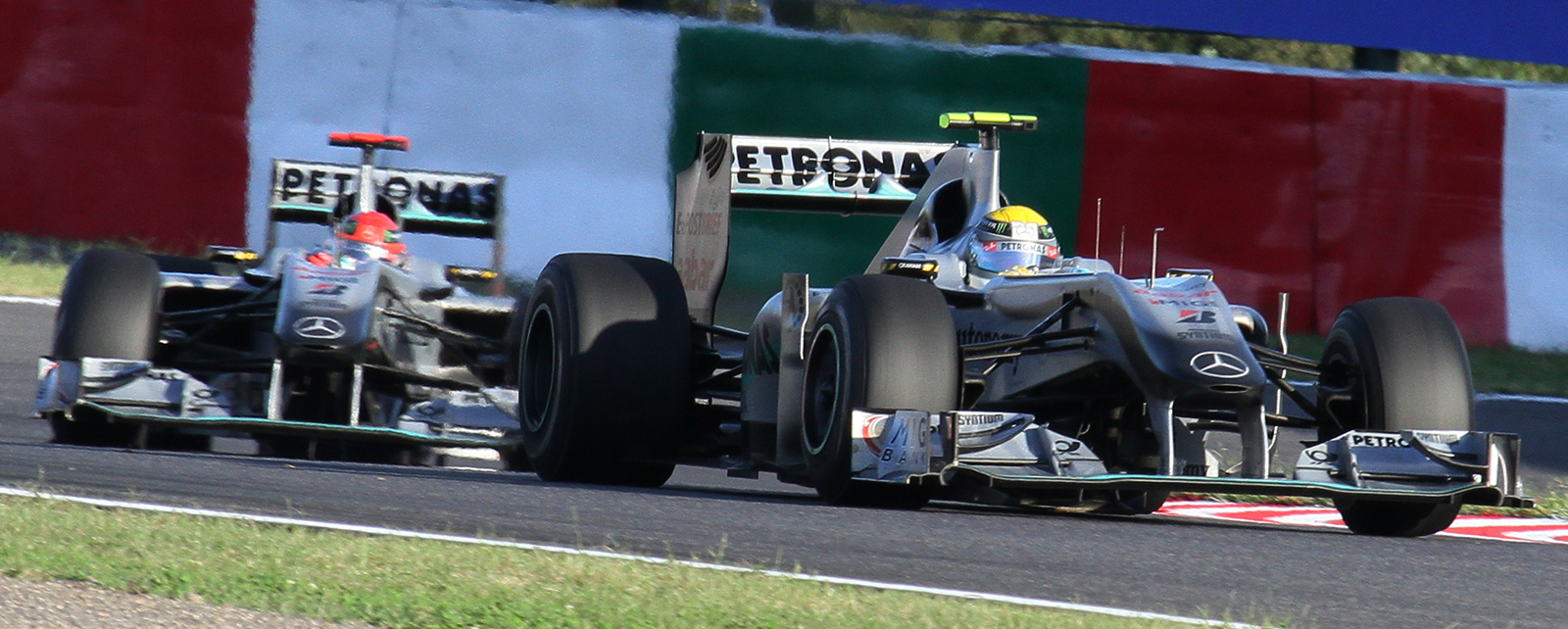
Nico Rosberg consistently out-performed his teammate Michael Schumacher.

Button became the first driver to win more than one race with victory in China, but Mark Webber would be the first to take back-to-back victories with wins in Spain and Monaco. Webber was leading the Turkish Grand Prix when teammate Vettel attempted a pass on lap 40 that ended with the two Red Bulls colliding; Vettel retired whilst Webber recovered to finish third behind eventual race winner Lewis Hamilton and Jenson Button. Hamilton would match Webber's feat of back-to-back victories by claiming first place in Canada.

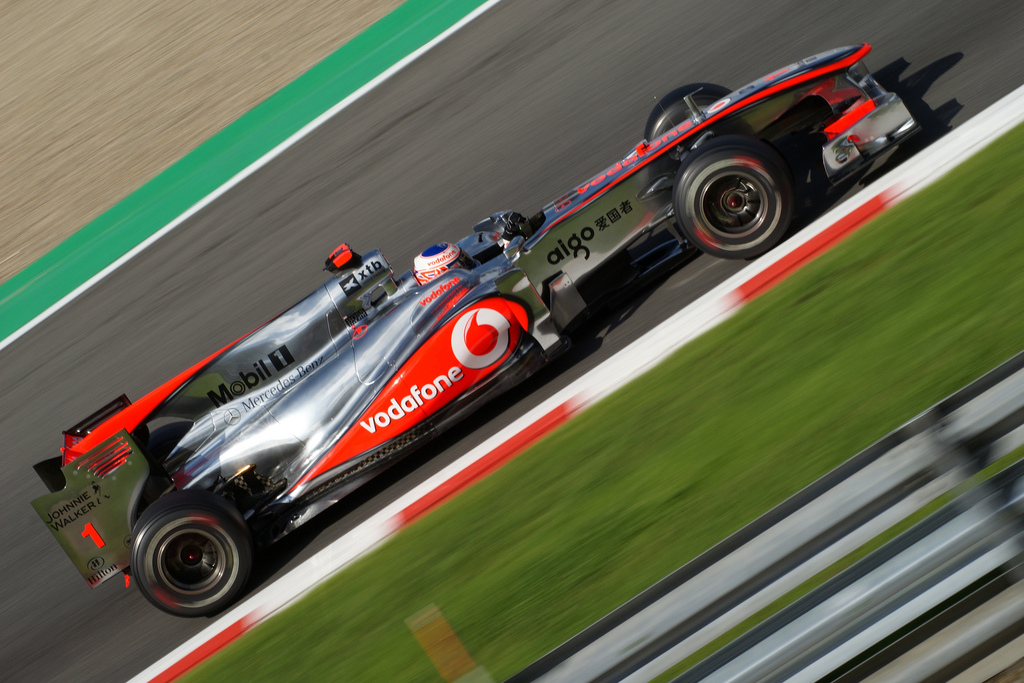
Reigning World Champion Jenson Button scored his first victory for McLaren in Australia.

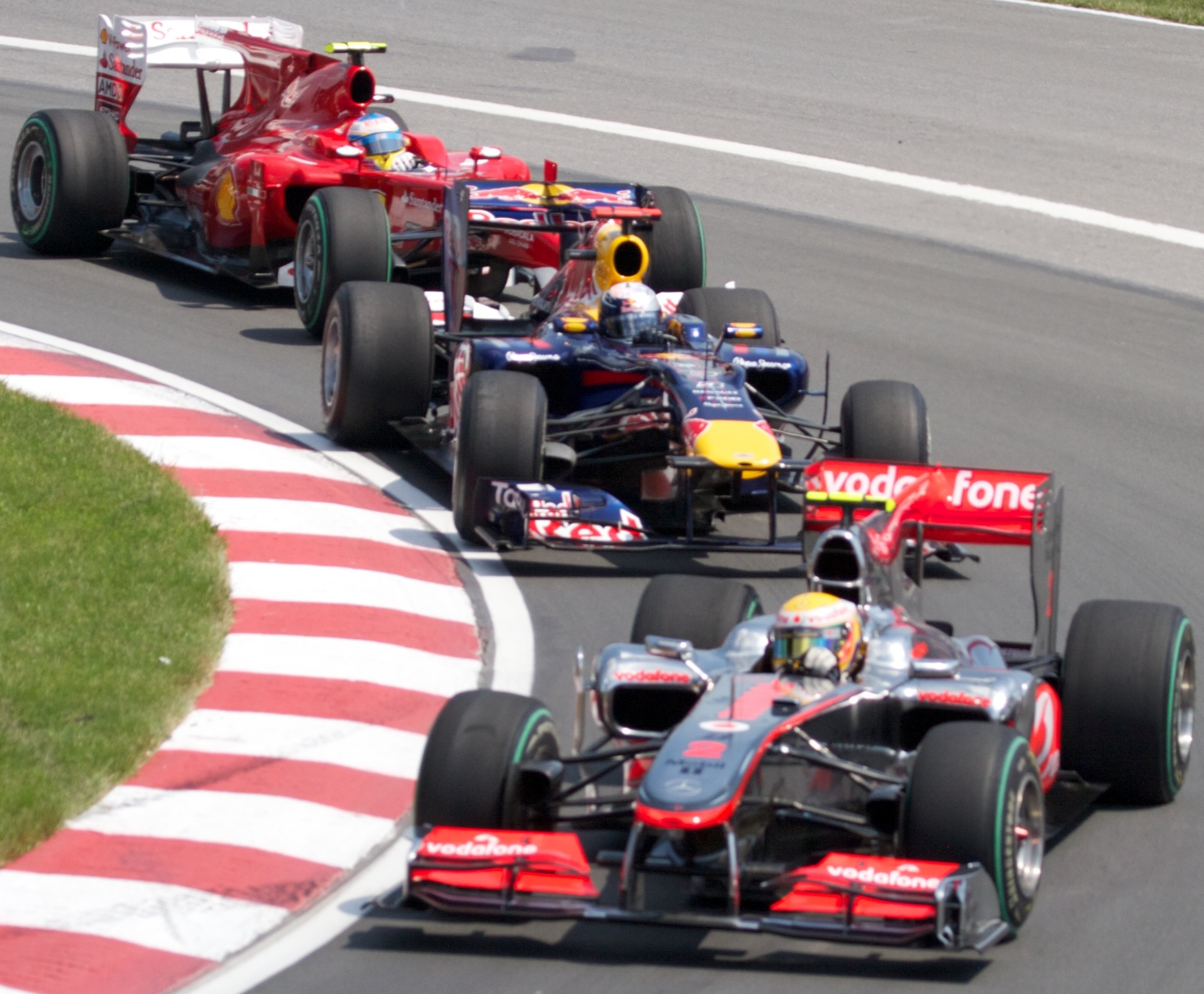
Lewis Hamilton leading Sebastian Vettel and Fernando Alonso at the Canadian Grand Prix. Hamilton won the race to take the Drivers' Championship lead.

The middle of the season saw controversy, starting at the European Grand Prix in Valencia following a disputed safety car ruling. Mark Webber collided with Heikki Kovalainen at the fastest point on the circuit, the collision destroying Webber's front wing and launching Webber into a somersault. The safety car was deployed immediately, joining the circuit behind race leader Vettel, but ahead of then-second placed Hamilton and the Ferraris of Alonso and Felipe Massa. Hamilton overtook the safety car as it emerged from the pit lane but after it had crossed the safety car control line. It took the race stewards twenty minutes to pass verdict on the infringement, and while Hamilton was issued with a drive-through penalty for his actions, it had little effect as he was already well clear of the rest of the field.

The British Grand Prix marked the halfway point of the season and saw further tensions within Red Bull. Team principal Christian Horner removed the team's new front wing from Webber's car and placed it on Vettel's for qualifying and the race, after the German driver's wing was damaged in the final practice session. Webber won the race after passing Vettel from second off the start, who then developed a puncture on the first lap and was forced to pit.

The German Grand Prix saw a return to form for Ferrari, with both Alonso and Massa quickest over the course of the race meeting. On the anniversary of his accident, Felipe Massa led most of the race before a message from the Ferrari pit appeared to be a coded instruction telling Massa to move over and let Alonso through, granting Alonso seven extra World Championship points for his ultimate win. Ferrari were fined US$100,000 for the use of team orders to deliberately alter the outcome of a race and faced further sanctions at a meeting of the FIA World Motor Sport Council in September where they face charges of bringing the sport into disrepute, though the hearing would ultimately acquit Ferrari on the grounds of a lack of evidence.

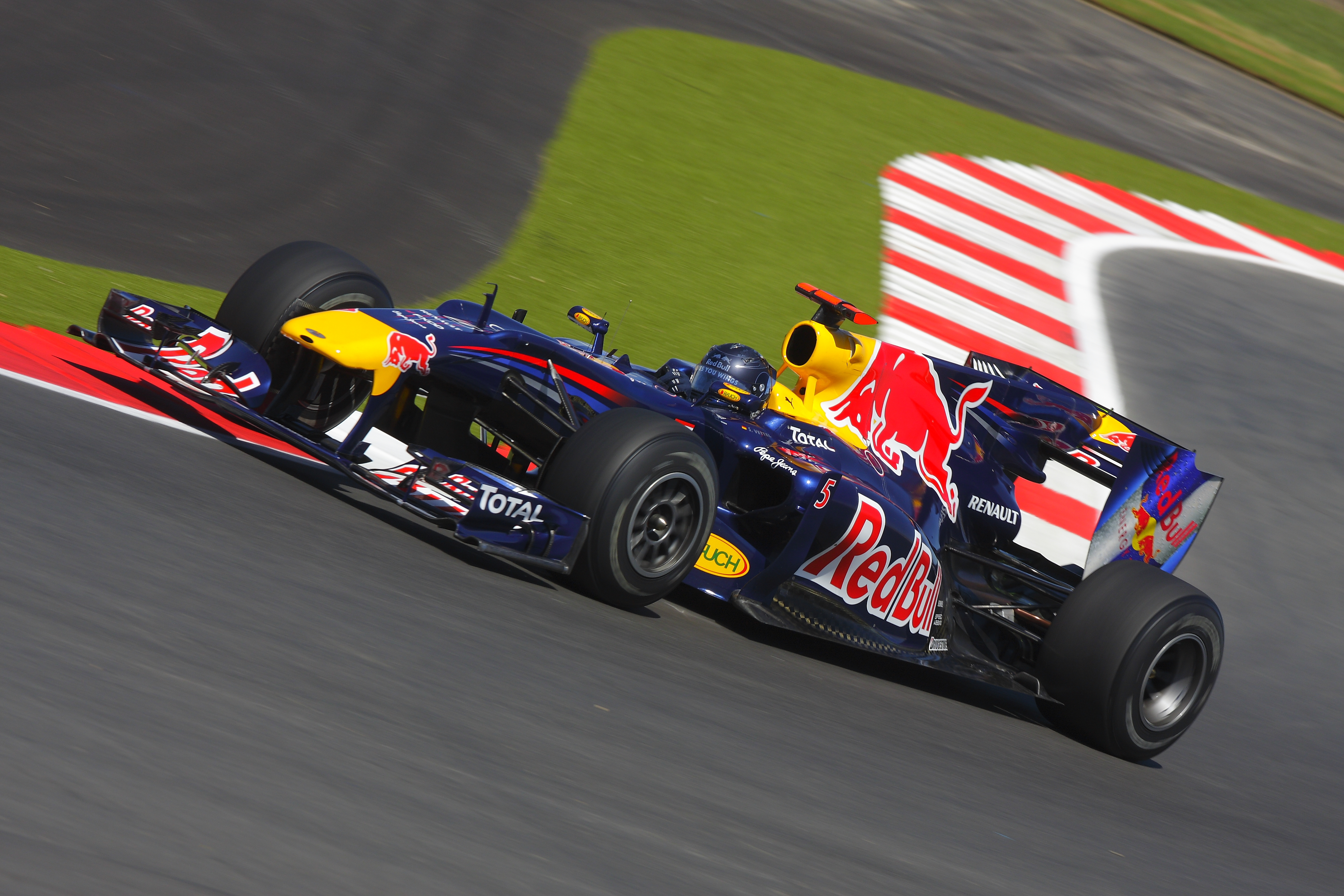
Sebastian Vettel won three of the last four races, winning the championship in Abu Dhabi.

After finishing sixth in Germany, Webber won again in Hungary after Vettel broke an obscure safety car rule and was issued with a drive-through penalty that demoted him to third, while Lewis Hamilton won a wet Belgian Grand Prix from Mark Webber and Robert Kubica while Vettel was involved in a collision with Button that eliminated the incumbent World Champion whilst Vettel was handed his second drive-through penalty in as many races. Fernando Alonso retired after a mistake in the wet. The European season ended in Italy, with Alonso claiming his third victory of the season and adding a fourth to his tally – and his first Grand Slam – in Singapore.

Red Bull reasserted their dominance in Japan, with Vettel winning comfortably from Webber and Alonso third. They were prepared to continue their performance in a rain-delayed Korean Grand Prix, but an early accident eliminated Webber and a late engine failure for Vettel handed the victory to Alonso. Nico Hülkenberg claimed his maiden pole position for Williams by over a second in changing conditions in Brazil, but Red Bull went on to claim their fourth 1–2 finish of the season, claiming enough points to be declared World Constructors' Champion in just their sixth year of competition.

There were a record 10 changes of leadership in the title race, variously led by every top-6 finisher except Vettel, who eventually took the championship victory in the last race.

In the week leading up to the final race of the season, Red Bull repeated their intentions not to use team orders, a decision they were widely criticised for as allowing Mark Webber to finish ahead of Sebastian Vettel would have meant he trailed Fernando Alonso by just one point ahead of the race in Abu Dhabi. However, the Australian struggled to find speed across the weekend, qualifying behind Alonso and unable to find a way past the Ferrari driver for most of the race. Like Webber, Alonso had opted for an early pit stop in his tyre strategy, but emerged behind Russian rookie Vitaly Petrov. Taking into account the cars ahead of them that had yet to stop, this meant that Alonso would be running sixth on the road when he needed to finish fourth to claim the title.

McLaren's Jenson Button took the lead of the race when Sebastian Vettel pitted, the 2009 World Champion attempting to extend his lead enough to avoid a costly encounter with Robert Kubica after Lewis Hamilton got caught behind the Renault driver; passing Kubica would give him a chance to catch Vettel, who would resume the lead when Button pitted. Button needed a lead of twenty-two seconds to rejoin the circuit ahead of Kubica and Hamilton, but Kubica was able to match him on lap times and McLaren were forced to pit Button, who rejoined fourth behind his teammate, becoming third when Kubica pitted. While Kubica was expected to rejoin somewhere behind Mark Webber, Vitaly Petrov had held Webber and Alonso up enough that when Kubica completed his stop, he joined the circuit ahead of them, adding his name to the list of drivers Alonso needed to pass in order to win the World Championship. Sebastian Vettel won the race, with the McLarens second and third. Alonso was unable to find a way past Petrov and so finished seventh, handing the title to Vettel by four points. Abu Dhabi was the first time Sebastian Vettel had led the 2010 World Championship. Only twice before in the history of Formula One had the Drivers' World Champion led the championship only for the last race: in 1964 and 1976.

== Results and standings ==
=== Grands Prix ===
Round	Grand Prix	Pole position	Fastest lap	Winning driver	Winning constructor	Report
1	Bahrain Grand Prix	(Germany) Sebastian Vettel	(Spain) Fernando Alonso	(Spain) Fernando Alonso	(Italy) Ferrari	Report
2	(Australia) Australian Grand Prix	(Germany) Sebastian Vettel	(Australia) Mark Webber	(United Kingdom) Jenson Button	(United Kingdom) McLaren-Mercedes	Report
3	(Malaysia) Malaysian Grand Prix	(Australia) Mark Webber	(Australia) Mark Webber	(Germany) Sebastian Vettel	(Austria) Red Bull-Renault	Report
4	(China) Chinese Grand Prix	(Germany) Sebastian Vettel	(United Kingdom) Lewis Hamilton	(United Kingdom) Jenson Button	(United Kingdom) McLaren-Mercedes	Report
5	(Spain) Spanish Grand Prix	(Australia) Mark Webber	(United Kingdom) Lewis Hamilton	(Australia) Mark Webber	(Austria) Red Bull-Renault	Report
6	Monaco Grand Prix	(Australia) Mark Webber	(Germany) Sebastian Vettel	(Australia) Mark Webber	(Austria) Red Bull-Renault	Report
7	(Turkey) Turkish Grand Prix	(Australia) Mark Webber	(Russia) Vitaly Petrov	(United Kingdom) Lewis Hamilton	(United Kingdom) McLaren-Mercedes	Report
8	(Canada) Canadian Grand Prix	(United Kingdom) Lewis Hamilton	(Poland) Robert Kubica	(United Kingdom) Lewis Hamilton	(United Kingdom) McLaren-Mercedes	Report
9	(Spain) European Grand Prix	(Germany) Sebastian Vettel	(United Kingdom) Jenson Button	(Germany) Sebastian Vettel	(Austria) Red Bull-Renault	Report
10	(United Kingdom) British Grand Prix	(Germany) Sebastian Vettel	(Spain) Fernando Alonso	(Australia) Mark Webber	(Austria) Red Bull-Renault	Report
11	(Germany) German Grand Prix	(Germany) Sebastian Vettel	(Germany) Sebastian Vettel	(Spain) Fernando Alonso	(Italy) Ferrari	Report
12	(Hungary) Hungarian Grand Prix	(Germany) Sebastian Vettel	(Germany) Sebastian Vettel	(Australia) Mark Webber	(Austria) Red Bull-Renault	Report
13	(Belgium) Belgian Grand Prix	(Australia) Mark Webber	(United Kingdom) Lewis Hamilton	(United Kingdom) Lewis Hamilton	(United Kingdom) McLaren-Mercedes	Report
14	(Italy) Italian Grand Prix	(Spain) Fernando Alonso	(Spain) Fernando Alonso	(Spain) Fernando Alonso	(Italy) Ferrari	Report
15	Singapore Grand Prix	(Spain) Fernando Alonso	(Spain) Fernando Alonso	(Spain) Fernando Alonso	(Italy) Ferrari	Report
16	(Japan) Japanese Grand Prix	(Germany) Sebastian Vettel	(Australia) Mark Webber	(Germany) Sebastian Vettel	(Austria) Red Bull-Renault	Report
17	(South Korea) Korean Grand Prix	(Germany) Sebastian Vettel	(Spain) Fernando Alonso	(Spain) Fernando Alonso	(Italy) Ferrari	Report
18	(Brazil) Brazilian Grand Prix	(Germany) Nico Hülkenberg	(United Kingdom) Lewis Hamilton	(Germany) Sebastian Vettel	(Austria) Red Bull-Renault	Report
19	(United Arab Emirates) Abu Dhabi Grand Prix	(Germany) Sebastian Vettel	(United Kingdom) Lewis Hamilton	(Germany) Sebastian Vettel	(Austria) Red Bull-Renault	Report

=== Scoring system ===
Points were awarded to the top 10 classified finishers.

Position	1st	2nd	3rd	4th	5th	6th	7th	8th	9th	10th
Points	25	18	15	12	10	8	6	4	2	1

=== World Drivers' Championship standings ===
Pos.	Driver	BHR (Bahrain)	AUS (Australia)	MAL (Malaysia)	CHN (China)	ESP (Spain)	MON (Monaco)	TUR (Turkey)	CAN (Canada)	EUR (Spain)	GBR (United Kingdom)	GER (Germany)	HUN (Hungary)	BEL (Belgium)	ITA (Italy)	SIN (Singapore)	JPN (Japan)	KOR (South Korea)	BRA (Brazil)	ABU (United Arab Emirates)	Points
1	(Germany) Sebastian Vettel	4^{P}	Ret^{P}	1	6^{P}	3	2^{F}	Ret	4	1^{P}	7^{P}	3^{P}^{F}	3^{P}^{F}	15	4	2	1^{P}	Ret^{P}	1	1^{P}	256
2	(Spain) Fernando Alonso	1^{F}	4	13^{†}	4	2	6	8	3	8	14^{F}	1	2	Ret	1^{P}^{F}	1^{P}^{F}	3	1^{F}	3	7	252
3	(Australia) Mark Webber	8	9^{F}	2^{P}^{F}	8	1^{P}	1^{P}	3^{P}	5	Ret	1	6	1	2^{P}	6	3	2^{F}	Ret	2	8	242
4	(United Kingdom) Lewis Hamilton	3	6	6	2^{F}	14^{F}^{†}	5	1	1^{P}	2	2	4	Ret	1^{F}	Ret	Ret	5	2	4^{F}	2^{F}	240
5	(United Kingdom) Jenson Button	7	1	8	1	5	Ret	2	2	3^{F}	4	5	8	Ret	2	4	4	12	5	3	214
6	(Brazil) Felipe Massa	2	3	7	9	6	4	7	15	11	15	2	4	4	3	8	Ret	3	15	10	144
7	(Germany) Nico Rosberg	5	5	3	3	13	7	5	6	10	3	8	Ret	6	5	5	17^{†}	Ret	6	4	142
8	(Poland) Robert Kubica	11	2	4	5	8	3	6	7^{F}	5	Ret	7	Ret	3	8	7	Ret	5	9	5	136
9	(Germany) Michael Schumacher	6	10	Ret	10	4	12	4	11	15	9	9	11	7	9	13	6	4	7	Ret	72
10	(Brazil) Rubens Barrichello	10	8	12	12	9	Ret	14	14	4	5	12	10	Ret	10	6	9	7	14	12	47
11	(Germany) Adrian Sutil	12	Ret	5	11	7	8	9	10	6	8	17	Ret	5	16	9	Ret	Ret	12	13	47
12	(Japan) Kamui Kobayashi	Ret	Ret	Ret	Ret	12	Ret	10	Ret	7	6	11	9	8	Ret	Ret	7	8	10	14	32
13	(Russia) Vitaly Petrov	Ret	Ret	Ret	7	11	13^{†}	15^{F}	17	14	13	10	5	9	13	11	Ret	Ret	16	6	27
14	(Germany) Nico Hülkenberg	14	Ret	10	15	16	Ret	17	13	Ret	10	13	6	14	7	10	Ret	10	8^{P}	16	22
15	(Italy) Vitantonio Liuzzi	9	7	Ret	Ret	15^{†}	9	13	9	16	11	16	13	10	12	Ret	Ret	6	Ret	Ret	21
16	(Switzerland) Sébastien Buemi	16^{†}	Ret	11	Ret	Ret	10	16	8	9	12	Ret	12	12	11	14	10	Ret	13	15	8
17	(Spain) Pedro de la Rosa	Ret	12	DNS	Ret	Ret	Ret	11	Ret	12	Ret	14	7	11	14						6
18	(Germany) Nick Heidfeld															Ret	8	9	17	11	6
19	(Spain) Jaime Alguersuari	13	11	9	13	10	11	12	12	13	Ret	15	Ret	13	15	12	11	11	11	9	5
20	(Finland) Heikki Kovalainen	15	13	NC	14	DNS	Ret	Ret	16	Ret	17	Ret	14	16	18	16^{†}	12	13	18	17	0
21	(Italy) Jarno Trulli	17^{†}	DNS	17	Ret	17	15^{†}	Ret	Ret	21	16	Ret	15	19	Ret	Ret	13	Ret	19	21^{†}	0
22	(India) Karun Chandhok	Ret	14	15	17	Ret	14^{†}	20^{†}	18	18	19										0
23	(Brazil) Bruno Senna	Ret	Ret	16	16	Ret	Ret	Ret	Ret	20		19	17	Ret	Ret	Ret	15	14	21	19	0
24	(Brazil) Lucas di Grassi	Ret	Ret	14	Ret	19	Ret	19	19	17	Ret	Ret	18	17	20^{†}	15	DNS	Ret	NC	18	0
25	(Germany) Timo Glock	Ret	Ret	Ret	DNS	18	Ret	18	Ret	19	18	18	16	18	17	Ret	14	Ret	20	Ret	0
26	(Japan) Sakon Yamamoto										20	Ret	19	20	19		16	15			0
27	(Austria) Christian Klien															Ret			22	20	0
Pos.	Driver	BHR (Bahrain)	AUS (Australia)	MAL (Malaysia)	CHN (China)	ESP (Spain)	MON (Monaco)	TUR (Turkey)	CAN (Canada)	EUR (Spain)	GBR (United Kingdom)	GER (Germany)	HUN (Hungary)	BEL (Belgium)	ITA (Italy)	SIN (Singapore)	JPN (Japan)	KOR (South Korea)	BRA (Brazil)	ABU (United Arab Emirates)	Points

Key
Colour	Result
Gold	Winner
Silver	Second place
Bronze	Third place
Green	Other points position
Blue	Other classified position
Blue	Not classified, finished (NC)
Purple	Not classified, retired (Ret)
Red	Did not qualify (DNQ)
Black	Disqualified (DSQ)
White	Did not start (DNS)
White	Race cancelled (C)
Blank	Did not practice (DNP)
Blank	Excluded (EX)
Blank	Did not arrive (DNA)
Blank	Withdrawn (WD)
Blank	Did not enter (empty cell)
Annotation	Meaning
P	Pole position
F	Fastest lap

Notes:

- † – Drivers did not finish the Grand Prix, but were classified as they completed more than 90% of the race distance.

=== World Constructors' Championship standings ===
Pos.	Constructor	No.	BHR (Bahrain)	AUS (Australia)	MAL (Malaysia)	CHN (China)	ESP (Spain)	MON (Monaco)	TUR (Turkey)	CAN (Canada)	EUR (Spain)	GBR (United Kingdom)	GER (Germany)	HUN (Hungary)	BEL (Belgium)	ITA (Italy)	SIN (Singapore)	JPN (Japan)	KOR (South Korea)	BRA (Brazil)	ABU (United Arab Emirates)	Points
1	(Austria) Red Bull-Renault	5	4^{P}	Ret^{P}	1	6^{P}	3	2^{F}	Ret	4	1^{P}	7^{P}	3^{P}^{F}	3^{P}^{F}	15	4	2	1^{P}	Ret^{P}	1	1^{P}	498
1	(Austria) Red Bull-Renault	6	8	9^{F}	2^{P}^{F}	8	1^{P}	1^{P}	3^{P}	5	Ret	1	6	1	2^{P}	6	3	2^{F}	Ret	2	8	498
2	(United Kingdom) McLaren-Mercedes	1	7	1	8	1	5	Ret	2	2	3^{F}	4	5	8	Ret	2	4	4	12	5	3	454
2	(United Kingdom) McLaren-Mercedes	2	3	6	6	2^{F}	14^{F}^{†}	5	1	1^{P}	2	2	4	Ret	1^{F}	Ret	Ret	5	2	4^{F}	2^{F}	454
3	(Italy) Ferrari	7	2	3	7	9	6	4	7	15	11	15	2	4	4	3	8	Ret	3	15	10	396
3	(Italy) Ferrari	8	1^{F}	4	13^{†}	4	2	6	8	3	8	14^{F}	1	2	Ret	1^{P}^{F}	1^{P}^{F}	3	1^{F}	3	7	396
4	(Germany) Mercedes	3	6	10	Ret	10	4	12	4	11	15	9	9	11	7	9	13	6	4	7	Ret	214
4	(Germany) Mercedes	4	5	5	3	3	13	7	5	6	10	3	8	Ret	6	5	5	17^{†}	Ret	6	4	214
5	(France) Renault	11	11	2	4	5	8	3	6	7^{F}	5	Ret	7	Ret	3	8	7	Ret	5	9	5	163
5	(France) Renault	12	Ret	Ret	Ret	7	11	13^{†}	15^{F}	17	14	13	10	5	9	13	11	Ret	Ret	16	6	163
6	(United Kingdom) Williams-Cosworth	9	10	8	12	12	9	Ret	14	14	4	5	12	10	Ret	10	6	9	7	14	12	69
6	(United Kingdom) Williams-Cosworth	10	14	Ret	10	15	16	Ret	17	13	Ret	10	13	6	14	7	10	Ret	10	8^{P}	16	69
7	Force India-Mercedes	14	12	Ret	5	11	7	8	9	10	6	8	17	Ret	5	16	9	Ret	Ret	12	13	68
7	Force India-Mercedes	15	9	7	Ret	Ret	15^{†}	9	13	9	16	11	16	13	10	12	Ret	Ret	6	Ret	Ret	68
8	(Switzerland) BMW Sauber-Ferrari	22	Ret	12	DNS	Ret	Ret	Ret	11	Ret	12	Ret	14	7	11	14	Ret	8	9	17	11	44
8	(Switzerland) BMW Sauber-Ferrari	23	Ret	Ret	Ret	Ret	12	Ret	10	Ret	7	6	11	9	8	Ret	Ret	7	8	10	14	44
9	(Italy) Toro Rosso-Ferrari	16	16^{†}	Ret	11	Ret	Ret	10	16	8	9	12	Ret	12	12	11	14	10	Ret	13	15	13
9	(Italy) Toro Rosso-Ferrari	17	13	11	9	13	10	11	12	12	13	Ret	15	Ret	13	15	12	11	11	11	9	13
10	(Malaysia) Lotus-Cosworth	18	17^{†}	DNS	17	Ret	17	15^{†}	Ret	Ret	21	16	Ret	15	19	Ret	Ret	13	Ret	19	21^{†}	0
10	(Malaysia) Lotus-Cosworth	19	15	13	NC	14	DNS	Ret	Ret	16	Ret	17	Ret	14	16	18	16^{†}	12	13	18	17	0
11	(Spain) HRT-Cosworth	20	Ret	14	15	17	Ret	14^{†}	20^{†}	18	18	19	Ret	19	20	19	Ret	16	15	22	20	0
11	(Spain) HRT-Cosworth	21	Ret	Ret	16	16	Ret	Ret	Ret	Ret	20	20	19	17	Ret	Ret	Ret	15	14	21	19	0
12	(United Kingdom) Virgin-Cosworth	24	Ret	Ret	Ret	DNS	18	Ret	18	Ret	19	18	18	16	18	17	Ret	14	Ret	20	Ret	0
12	(United Kingdom) Virgin-Cosworth	25	Ret	Ret	14	Ret	19	Ret	19	19	17	Ret	Ret	18	17	20	15	DNS	Ret	NC	18	0
Pos.	Constructor	No.	BHR (Bahrain)	AUS (Australia)	MAL (Malaysia)	CHN (China)	ESP (Spain)	MON (Monaco)	TUR (Turkey)	CAN (Canada)	EUR (Spain)	GBR (United Kingdom)	GER (Germany)	HUN (Hungary)	BEL (Belgium)	ITA (Italy)	SIN (Singapore)	JPN (Japan)	KOR (South Korea)	BRA (Brazil)	ABU (United Arab Emirates)	Points

Key
Colour	Result
Gold	Winner
Silver	Second place
Bronze	Third place
Green	Other points position
Blue	Other classified position
Blue	Not classified, finished (NC)
Purple	Not classified, retired (Ret)
Red	Did not qualify (DNQ)
Black	Disqualified (DSQ)
White	Did not start (DNS)
White	Race cancelled (C)
Blank	Did not practice (DNP)
Blank	Excluded (EX)
Blank	Did not arrive (DNA)
Blank	Withdrawn (WD)
Blank	Did not enter (empty cell)
Annotation	Meaning
P	Pole position
F	Fastest lap

Notes:

- † – Drivers did not finish the Grand Prix, but were classified as they completed more than 90% of the race distance.
- Official FIA Results for the Constructors' Championship listed the constructors as Red Bull Racing, Vodafone McLaren Mercedes, Scuderia Ferrari Marlboro, etc.
