= FIM–IRTA war =

Political battle in Grand Prix motorcycle racing

The FIM–IRTA war was a political conflict contested throughout the late 1980s and early 1990s by the two representative organizations in Grand Prix motorcycle racing, the Fédération Internationale de Motocyclisme (FIM) and the International Road-Racing Teams Association (IRTA), as well as then-Formula One magnate Bernie Ecclestone.

The battle started in 1990 when the FIM gave the IRTA and Bernie Ecclestone more governing power (such as appointing new grand prix races) and came to a head in 1992 when the FIM cancelled the contract that would have allowed the IRTA and ROPA, the circuit owners, the right to market the television rights and instead giving those rights to Dorna Sports. Grand Prix motorcycle racing and Formula One eventually reunited under single commercial rights owner after Liberty Media acquired the majority of Dorna Sports and placed it under the Formula One Group in 2025.

== Introduction ==
The conflict started when in 1986, after various problems with the then existing Grand Prix Riders Association (GPRA), the International Road-Racing Teams Association (IRTA) was founded by Mike Trimby, morphing from a riders' trade union to a body representing the various teams.

The IRTA was founded to resolve various track safety problems (such as a factory team strike at the 1982 French motorcycle Grand Prix in Nogaro due to dangerous track conditions), as well as financial problems that plagued the sport during the 1980s. This however, was a start of a period of huge change for Grand Prix motorcycle racing, as this would kick off a power struggle between the FIM, the IRTA, Bernie Ecclestone and various other companies.

== Aftermath ==
After the conflicts were largely concluded in 1992, an alliance was formed between the FIM, the IRTA, the Motorcycle Sports Manufacturers' Association (MSMA) and Dorna Sports which stands until this day.

After Dorna had acquired the broadcast rights for all the motorcycle racing classes, the quality significantly improved. Before the takeover, the quality of the footage was significantly worse.

Bernie Ecclestone collaborated with Dorna in the 1992 season and managed to acquire the commercial rights of the sports, but eventually sold them off quietly to Dorna Sports for 50 million Pounds in 1993.

During the 1992 season, Bernie would create strangulation contracts and propose those to the organisers of the grands prix venues, which forced them to double the ticket prices. A few years ago, Bernie did the same thing with the 1990 Belgian motorcycle Grand Prix with the result that ticket sales plummeted and that eventually signed the beginning of the end for the Belgian round, as it was scrapped from the 1991 calendar onwards.

Ecclestone would however, still remain active in the promotion of the German motorcycle Grand Prix at the Hockenheimring. He invested a lot of money in the promotion of the venue, but the "high-class fans" he wanted to visit the race never came and due to his strangulation contract he had with the venue, he did not make profits until the end of the 5-year contract. Ecclestone continues to have good relations with Carmelo Ezpeleta and the rest of the Dorna Sports team.

In 2025, Liberty Media acquired the majority of Dorna Sports and placed it under the Formula One Group (having previously bought FOG from Ecclestone in 2017), bringing both Formula One and Grand Prix motorcycle racing under single commercial rights owner for the first time since the end of FIM-IRTA war. Existing Dorna management under Carmelo Ezpeleta is retained.

== See also ==
- FISA–FOCA war
- FIA–FOTA dispute
