= US F1 Team =

Proposed American auto racing team

Team US F1
- Full name: US F1 Team
- Base: Charlotte, North Carolina, United States; Alcañiz, Aragon, Spain
- Team principal(s): Ken Anderson; Peter Windsor

Formula One World Championship career
- Races entered: 0
- Engines: Cosworth
- Constructors' Championships: 0
- Drivers' Championships: 0
- Race victories: 0
- Podiums: 0
- Points: 0
- Pole positions: 0
- Fastest laps: 0

US F1 Team was a proposed Formula One team that was granted entry to the 2010 season. However, the team stopped work on its car and did not compete in 2010. It informed the FIA that it was not in a position to race and was removed from the official entry list.

The team was fronted by former Haas CNC Racing technical director Ken Anderson and journalist (and former Williams and Ferrari manager) Peter Windsor. US F1 was aiming to be the only F1 team based outside Europe, with their factory located in Charlotte, North Carolina. This was part of Anderson and Windsor's plan to promote American drivers and technology, as was their initial aim to run two American drivers in the 2010 season.

== Origins ==
On February 24, 2009, Peter Windsor and Ken Anderson appeared on the American cable television network Speed Channel to announce their intent to file an entry of a new Formula 1 team named US F1 for the 2010 Formula One World Championship.

On June 12, 2009, Team US F1 was granted entry to the 2010 Formula One World Championship. Due to the political controversy between the FIA and FOTA during the summer of 2009, US F1 was unable to sign the Concorde Agreement until July 29, 2009. This caused some delays in the planned schedule for production with certain budget caps and technical regulations still under debate at that time that were dropped in the final agreement.

Team US F1 set up a base of operations in Charlotte, North Carolina, in a building that at one time housed Joe Gibbs Racing's NASCAR operations. The team announced its plans for a secondary base at Motorland Aragón in Spain to allow simplicity of operations during the European portion of the calendar without transport of materials back to North Carolina.

== 2010 season ==
On December 22, 2009, F1 CEO Bernie Ecclestone was one of several to express doubts about the team making it to the grid for 2010. Windsor denied these rumors and on the same day unveiled a completed team website. Over the Christmas holiday, Windsor's blog stated that the development team had only taken two days off "when European-based teams might break for a few weeks" and that he would not allow "16 valuable days lost in the too-short life of the F1 European winter" to be wasted.

Originally the team planned on running two American drivers. Windsor later altered that goal, stating that the team might employ more experienced, non-American drivers in their first season to help speed up future development. The team also declined to use so-called "pay drivers". On November 21, 2009, Argentine driver José María López announced that he had a conditional deal with the US F1 team to drive in the 2010 season, providing he secured an $8 million sponsorship package. On January 23, 2010, it was reported that López had completed a deal with US F1 to drive in the 2010 season, and on January 25, 2010, it was officially announced that he would drive for the team. Windsor said that "securing 'Pechito' López for our debut season has been a goal of ours for a long time" in an official release on the team website. At the same time the team signed the former Honda test driver James Rossiter, although this was never officially confirmed. Rossiter was then nearly signed by KV Racing Technology to race in the IndyCar Series.

The team's chassis, to be known as the US F1 Type 1, was to utilize the Cosworth CA2010 engine. In September, the first images of the Type 1 appeared in an interview on SpeedTV's Windtunnel program. A blog entry by senior engineer Scott Bennett revealed that the car would not simply be a design clone of current cars, but would be very innovative in development. US F1 was to have been the only new team in 2010 to feature their own gearbox, produced by EMCO Gears, Inc.

Windsor's team blog confirmed that one of the team's initial investors was the advertising agency of Goodby, Silverstein & Partners, while Chad Hurley, co-founder of YouTube, was the team's primary investor.

== Team shutdown ==

By mid-February, it was widely reported that the team was in imminent danger of collapse due to financial problems and that Hurley had withdrawn his backing from the project. On February 20, Ken Anderson said that the team was asking the FIA if it could miss the first four races of the season and begin at the Spanish Grand Prix. He said the FIA was working with him to evaluate options for the team. Furthermore, Anderson said that both Peter Windsor and Chad Hurley remained with the team. He also weighed the fact that López could take his money to rival team Campos Meta but he hoped he would stay with US F1. On February 23, Locstein, a Swiss-based financial services firm and potential sponsor of the team, released a press statement saying "When it was apparent that the team was not able to participate in the entire 2010 season, Locstein elected to withdraw from further involvement with US F1". The withdrawal sparked fresh allegations about the state of the team's finances, forcing the FIA to evaluate the situation further.

In late February, senior team personnel accused Windsor and Anderson of fundamentally mis-managing the team, with any and all decisions having to go through Anderson before they could be approved, creating a hold up in the design and build process. The personnel claim the team had known it was in trouble as early as December, but it was not until February that Windsor and Anderson were made aware of the danger, when the entire staff unanimously expressed doubts that US F1 would arrive in Bahrain. On February 24, FIA technical delegate Charlie Whiting inspected the team's facilities in order to assess its readiness for the 2010 season. A week later it was revealed the team "was not capable of competing".

On February 26, journalist Adam Cooper reported that Hurley was in discussion with Zoran Stefanović to try and merge US F1 with Stefan Grand Prix – Anderson and Windsor were said to be against the move. Stefanović subsequently acknowledged that negotiations had taken place, but that they had been unsuccessful. Subsequently, on February 28, it was revealed that Anderson and Hurley had formally asked the FIA to defer their entry until 2011, offering to post a seven-figure bond as proof of their intentions to race. The FIA subsequently announced, however, that the entry process for 2011 would be fully re-opened.

On March 2, all team personnel were dismissed from duties. José María López was freed from his contract with the team the day before the factory shut down. His manager, Felipe McGough, blamed Anderson for the downfall of the team and stated that Anderson had "deceived the FIA". The FIA published an updated 2010 entry list on March 3 which did not include US F1, and included an addendum that the team "have indicated that they will not be in a position to participate in 2010". The same day, Anderson spoke to Autosport, explaining why US F1 would not be on the grid for the 2010 season. On April 1, the Charlotte Business Journal reported that the team had closed permanently, citing "serious economic and funding challenges."

It was also revealed that the team had bought two trailers for the transportation and support of their Formula One cars from Brawn GP. As the team failed to make it to the grid, the UK High Court put them for sale on eBay to pay off one of the team's creditors.

On June 24, the FIA World Motor Sport Council conducted a disciplinary hearing into US F1's failure to compete in the 2010 season. The team was fined €309,000 plus the costs of the hearing and banned from competing in any FIA-sanctioned championship.

== Attempted rebirth as Cypher Group ==
In early 2010, plans emerged for a prospective American team known as Cypher, which was later confirmed to be formed from the remains of US F1. The re-imagining of the team was not associated with either Ken Anderson or Peter Windsor. The Cypher Group later withdrew their bid to join F1 for the 2011 season.
