= Ken Anderson (motorsport) =

American motorsport engineer

Ken Anderson is an American motorsport engineer, operating over the course of his career in motocross, IndyCar, Formula One, IRL and NASCAR.

== US F1 Team ==
In late 2008, it was announced that along with Peter Windsor, Anderson would be founding the Formula One team US F1, which lodged a successful bid for a 2010 season entry.

Due to contracted sponsorship money not being paid, the team was forced to withdraw from the championship.
