= Peter Windsor =

Australian motorsport journalist and former team manager

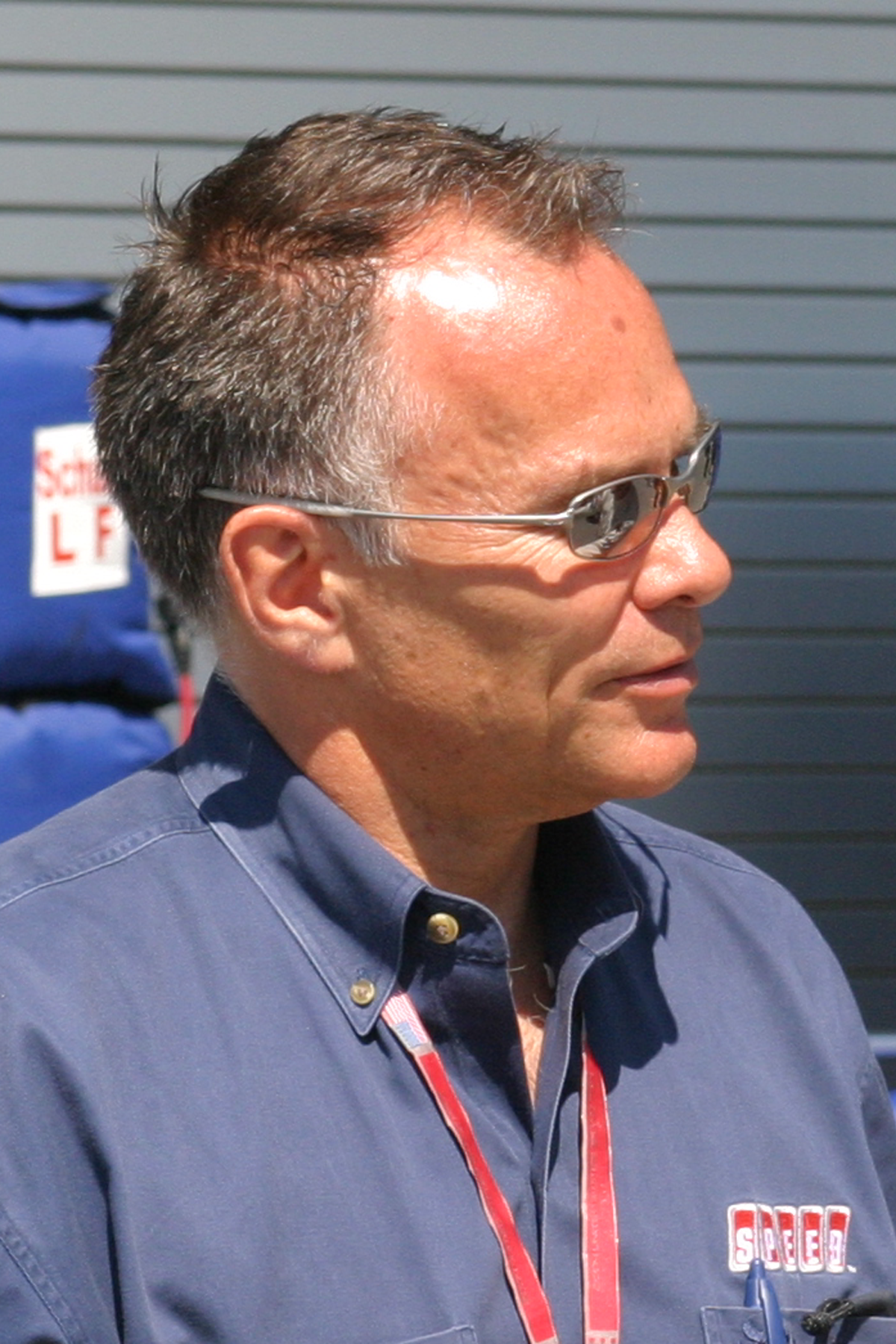
- Windsor at the 2004 United States Grand Prix
- Born: Peter David Windsor; 11 April 1952 (age 74); Reigate, Surrey, England

Peter David Windsor (born 11 April 1952) is a Formula One journalist and former Formula One team and sponsorship manager.

== Career ==
Born in Reigate on 11 April 1952, Windsor started his journalism career at the monthly magazine Competition Car. He was the motorsport editor for the British weekly magazine Autocar from the late 1970s until 1985.

=== Formula One ===
In 1985, Windsor became sponsorship manager at Williams for four years. He then worked as general manager for Ferrari's UK base in 1989, only to return to Williams as team manager in 1991. Windsor was Grand Prix Editor of the F1 Racing magazine from 1997 to 2009, and as of 2014 was the senior columnist and feature writer on The Racer's Edge section.

For several seasons, Windsor was the moderator for Formula One's post-qualifying and post-race press conferences. He handed the interviewer's microphone to James Allen from the 2009 British Grand Prix due to a concern over a potential or perceived conflict of interest as a future team boss; however, he returned to the interview room at the 2009 Italian Grand Prix. On 4 February 2009, it was reported Windsor and engineer/designer Ken Anderson were to head an American entrant into the 2010 Formula One season called US F1 Team. Their application was formally accepted by the FIA on 12 June 2009. Windsor's role would involve team management and driver development and selection. In March 2010, US F1 ceased operations. On 25 June 2010, the FIA officially banned US F1 from any further participation in the sport, and the World Motor Sport Council fined them €309,000 for failing to meet their commitments for the 2010 race season.

== Personal life ==
Shortly before the start of the 1986 season, Windsor was in an automobile accident when the car he was riding in with Frank Williams crashed on the way from the Paul Ricard Circuit in southern France to the Nice airport, causing Windsor minor injuries but leaving Williams, who was driving, paralysed.
